= 8th Air Support Operations Squadron =

- Squadron members, soldiers of the 173rd Airborne Brigade Combat Team and Italian army paratroopers Board a CH-47 Chinook
- Active: 1942–1945; 1984–1991; 1994-2004; 2006–2013
- Country: United States
- Branch: United States Air Force
- Role: Close air support operations
- Size: Squadron
- Motto(s): Sparare Avanzere Communicare (Italian for 'Shoot, Scoot, Communicate') (After 2006)
- Engagements: European Theater of Operations; Desert Storm
- Decorations: Air Force Outstanding Unit Award with Combat "V" Device; Air Force Outstanding Unit Award

Insignia
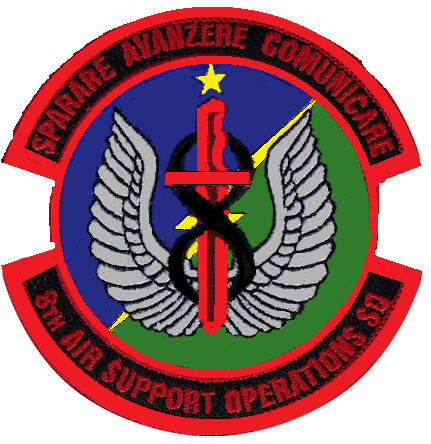
- 8 Air Support Operations Sq emblem

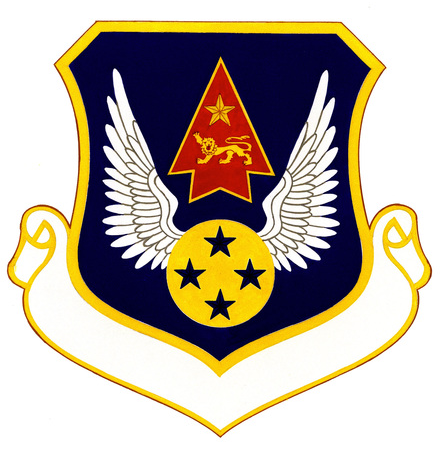
- 8th Air Support Operations Group emblem (Note: Approved 4 April 1989.)

The 8th Air Support Operations Squadron is an inactive United States Air Force unit that was last stationed at Aviano Air Base, Italy. Its first predecessor served during World War II, participating in the amphibious landings in Normandy on D-Day as the 8th Tactical Air Communications Squadron.

The squadron's second predecessor served in combat during Desert Storm as the 8th Air Support Operations Group, but was inactivated later in 1991. It was activated as a squadron at Aviano in December 2006.

== History ==
=== World War II ===
The squadron's first predecessor was activated in August 1942 at Richmond Army Air Base as the 8th Communications Squadron. Although assigned to Eighth Air Force, it was attached to First Air Force for training until moving to the European Theater of Operations in January 1943.

It entered combat as the 8th Tactical Air Communications Squadron on D-Day, 6 June. Its air support parties primarily served units of the United States First Army, directing air support missions for the ground forces they served. It provided six teams that made airborne and amphibious landings in the initial invasion. It continued in combat until May 1945. Following V-E Day, it became part of the occupation forces until returning to the United States in December 1945 for inactivation. It was disbanded on 8 October 1948.

=== Cold War and Desert Storm ===
The second predecessor of the squadron was activated at Moehringen Army Installation, Germany in March 1984 as the 602nd Air Support Operations Center. It advised the Army's VII Corps on employment of tactical airpower. It provided the VII Corps with an air support operations center and managed the tactical air control parties for the corps’ combat maneuver units. In February 1988, the two units were consolidated into a single unit that was redesignated the 8th Air Support Operations Group the following month. The group saw combat in Southwest Asia from January through December 1991, when it was inactivated.

=== Post Cold War ===
It was reduced to a flight and activated in July 1994 at Fort Lewis, Washington. It was inactivated there in 2004.

In December 2006 it was redesignated the 8th Air Support Operations Squadron and activated at Aviano Air Base, Italy. (Note: The 8th Air Support Operations Squadron (Provisional) was activated at Aviano on 25 August 2006 and attached to the 4th Air Support Operations Group. It was inactivated on 1 December 2006, when the 8th was activated, Air Force Historical Research Agency, Air Force Organization Change Status Report, August 2006, Maxwell AFB, AL.) The squadron's main mission was to advise Southern European Task Force and the 173rd Airborne Brigade on the use of air power and provide precision terminal attack guidance of close air support aircraft. Due to budget constraints, the squadron was inactivated in 2013.

== Lineage ==
8th Tactical Air Communications Squadron

- Constituted as the 8th Communications Squadron, Air Support on 8 July 1942 (Note: This squadron is not related to the 8th Communications Squadron, Wing (originally the 325th Signal Company, Aviation) active from 1946 to 1948, or the current 8th Communications Squadron, which was first activated in 1948.)

Activated on 29 August 1942
Redesignated 8th Air Support Communications Squadron on 11 January 1943
Redesignated 8th Air Support Control Squadron on 22 November 1943
Redesignated 8th Tactical Air Communications Squadron on 1 April 1944
Inactivated on 28 December 1945

- Disbanded on 8 October 1948
- Reconstituted on 8 February 1988 and consolidated with the 602d Air Support Operations Group as the 602d Air Support Operations Group

8th Air Support Operations Squadron

- Constituted as the 602nd Air Support Operations Center on 8 March 1984

Activated on 15 March 1984
Redesignated 602d Air Support Operations Group on 1 May 1985

- Consolidated with the 8th Tactical Air Communications Squadron on 8 February 1988

Redesignated [8th] Air Support Operations Group on 1 March 1988 (Note: Robertson lists this redesignation, but repeats the group's previous designation, in an apparent typographical error.)
Inactivated on 1 November 1991

- Redesignated 8th Air Support Operations Flight on 24 June 1994

Activated on 1 July 1994
Inactivated on 2 February 2004

- Redesignated 8th Air Support Operations Squadron on 21 November 2006

Activated on 1 December 2006
Inactivated in 2013

=== Assignments ===
- Eighth Air Force, 29 August 1942 (attached to First Air Force until c. 27 Dec 1942)
- VIII Air Support Command, c. 13 January 1943
- IX Fighter Command, 16 October 1943
- IX Air Support Command (later IX Tactical Air Command), 4 December 1943
- XII Tactical Air Command, 1 August – 30 November 1945
- Army Service Forces, Port of Embarkation, 1–28 December 1945
- 601st Tactical Control Wing, 15 March 1984
- 65th Air Division, 1 June 1985 (attached to Seventeenth Air Force for operational control after 31 October 1985)
- Seventeenth Air Force, 15 March 1986 – 1 November 1991
- 1st Air Support Operations Group, 1 July 1994 – 2 February 2004
- 4th Air Support Operations Group, 1 December 2006 – 2013

=== Stations ===
- Richmond Army Air Base, Virginia, 29 August – 26 December 1942
- RAF Aldermaston (Station 467), England, 15 January 1943 (deployed to RAF Membury (Station 466), England, c. 4 February – c. 20 March 1943)
- Aldermaston Court (Station 476), England, 17 April 1943
- Au Gay, France, c. 30 June 1944
- Les Oubeaux, France, c. 2 July 1944
- Canisy, France, 2 August 1944
- Coutouvray, France, 12 August 1944
- Haleine, France, 22 August 1944
- Rocquencourt, France, 2 September 1944
- Bomeree, Belgium, 11 September 1944
- Verviers, Belgium, 1 October 1944
- Charleroi, Belgium, 18 December 1944
- Verviers, Belgium, 17 January 1945
- Bruhl, Germany, 25 March 1945
- Marburg, Germany, 7 April 1945
- Weimar (R-7), Germany, 26 April 1945
- Fritzlar Airfield (Y-86), Germany, 27 June 1945
- Darmstadt-Griesheim Airfield (Y-76), Germany, 14 September 1945
- Stuttgart, Germany, 5 October 1945
- Darmstadt/Griesheim Airfield (Y-76), Germany, 10 October 1945
- Army Air Force Station Mannheim/Sandhofen (Y-79), Germany, 18 October – c. December 1945
- Camp Patrick Henry, Virginia, 25–28 December 1945
- Moehringen Army Installation, Germany, 15 March 1984 – 1 November 1991
- Fort Lewis, Washington, 1 July 1994 – 2 February 2004
- Aviano Air Base, Italy, 1 December 2006 – 2013
