= 474th =

474th may refer to:

- 474th Air Expeditionary Group, provisional United States Air Force unit assigned to Air Combat Command
- 474th Bombardment Squadron, inactive United States Air Force unit
- 474th Infantry Regiment (United States) or 74th Infantry Regiment (United States), Regular infantry regiment in the United States Army
- 474th Tactical Fighter Squadron, inactive United States Air Force unit
- 474th Tactical Fighter Wing, inactive United States Air Force unit

== See also ==
- 474 (number)
- 474, the year 474 (CDLXXIV) of the Julian calendar
- 474 BC
