= 477th =

477th may refer to:

- 477th Bombardment Squadron, inactive United States Air Force unit
- 477th Fighter Group, the Air Force Reserve Command's first F-22A Raptor unit
- 477th Tactical Fighter Squadron, inactive United States Air Force unit

== See also ==
- 477 (number)
- 477, the year 477 (CDLXXVII) of the Julian calendar
- 477 BC
