= 335th Bombardment Group =

335th Bombardment Group (later 335th Air Refueling Wing)
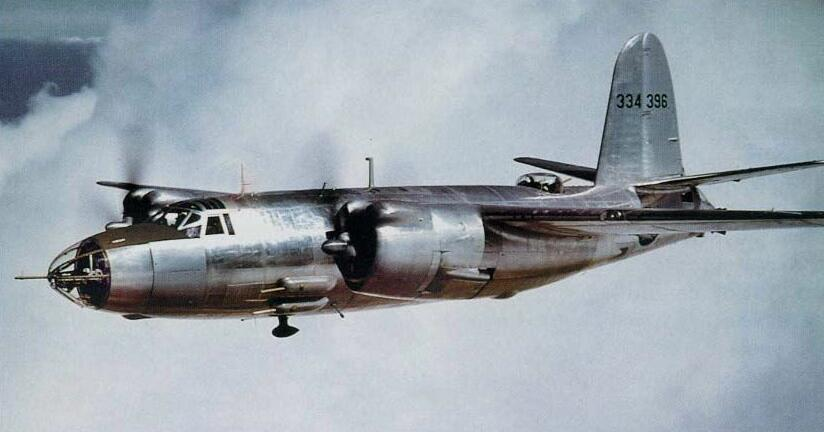
- Martin B-26 Marauder as flown by the group
- Active: 1942-1944
- Country: United States
- Branch: United States Air Force
- Role: medium bomber training
- Mottos: Fidus et Fortis Latin Faithful and Strong

Insignia
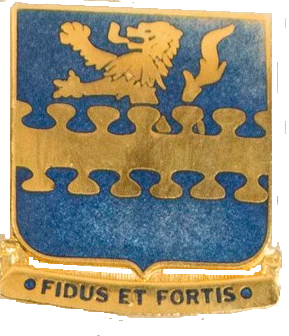
- 335th Bombardment Group emblem (Note: Approved 19 November 1942.)

The 335th Air Refueling Wing is an inactive United States Air Force unit. The group was active at Barksdale Field, Louisiana from July 1942 as a training unit for medium bomber aircrews. It was disbanded in May 1944, when the Army Air Forces reorganized its training and support units in the United States. The group was reconstituted in 1985 as the 335th Air Refueling Wing, but has not been active since then.

== History ==
The 335th Bombardment Group was activated on 17 July 1942 at Barksdale Field, Louisiana. Its original components were the 474th, 475th, 476th and 477th Bombardment Squadrons, and the group was equipped with Martin B-26 Marauders. It became part of Third Air Force, which was responsible for the majority of medium bomber training for the Army Air Forces (AAF). The group drew its cadre from the 17th Bombardment Group, which was in the process of converting to the B-26 from the North American B-25 Mitchell.

The 355th acted as a Replacement Training Unit (RTU) for the B-26. The RTU was an oversized unit which trained individual pilots and aircrews, after which they would be assigned to operational units. However, the AAF found that standard military units, whose manning was based on relatively inflexible tables of organization were not well adapted to the training mission. Accordingly, it adopted a more functional system in which each base was organized into a separate numbered unit, manned according to the base's specific needs. As this reorganization was implemented in the spring of 1944, he 335th Group, its components and supporting units at Barksdale, were disbanded on 1 May and replaced by the 331st AAF Base Unit (Medium, Bombardment). Group headquarters became Section N of the new base unit, while the four squadrons became Sections O, P, T and U. The reorganization also resulted in the addition of Section F, which trained Free French aviators on the Marauder.

The group was reconstituted in inactive status on 31 July 1985 and designated the 335th Air Refueling Wing. In addition, three of the group's four squadrons were consolidated with post-war fighter squadrons.

== Lineage ==
- Constituted as the 335th Bombardment Group (Medium) on 9 July 1942

Activated on 17 July 1942
Disbanded on 1 May 1944
Reconstituted on 31 July 1985 and redesignated 335th Air Refueling Wing

=== Assignments ===
- Third Air Force, 17 July 1942
- III Bomber Command, 31 July 1942 – 1 May 1944

=== Components ===
- 474th Bombardment Squadron: 17 July 1942 – 1 May 1944
- 475th Bombardment Squadron: 17 July 1942 – 1 May 1944
- 476th Bombardment Squadron: 17 July 1942 – 1 May 1944
- 477th Bombardment Squadron: 17 July 1942 – 1 May 1944

=== Stations ===
- Barksdale Field, Louisiana, 17 July 1942 – 1 May 1944

=== Aircraft ===
- Martin B-26 Marauder, 1942–1944

=== Campaigns ===
Service Streamer	Campaign	Dates	Notes
	American Theater without inscription	17 July 1942 – 1 May 1944	335th Bombardment Group
