= Seventeenth Expeditionary Air Force =

Former numbered air force of the United States Air Force

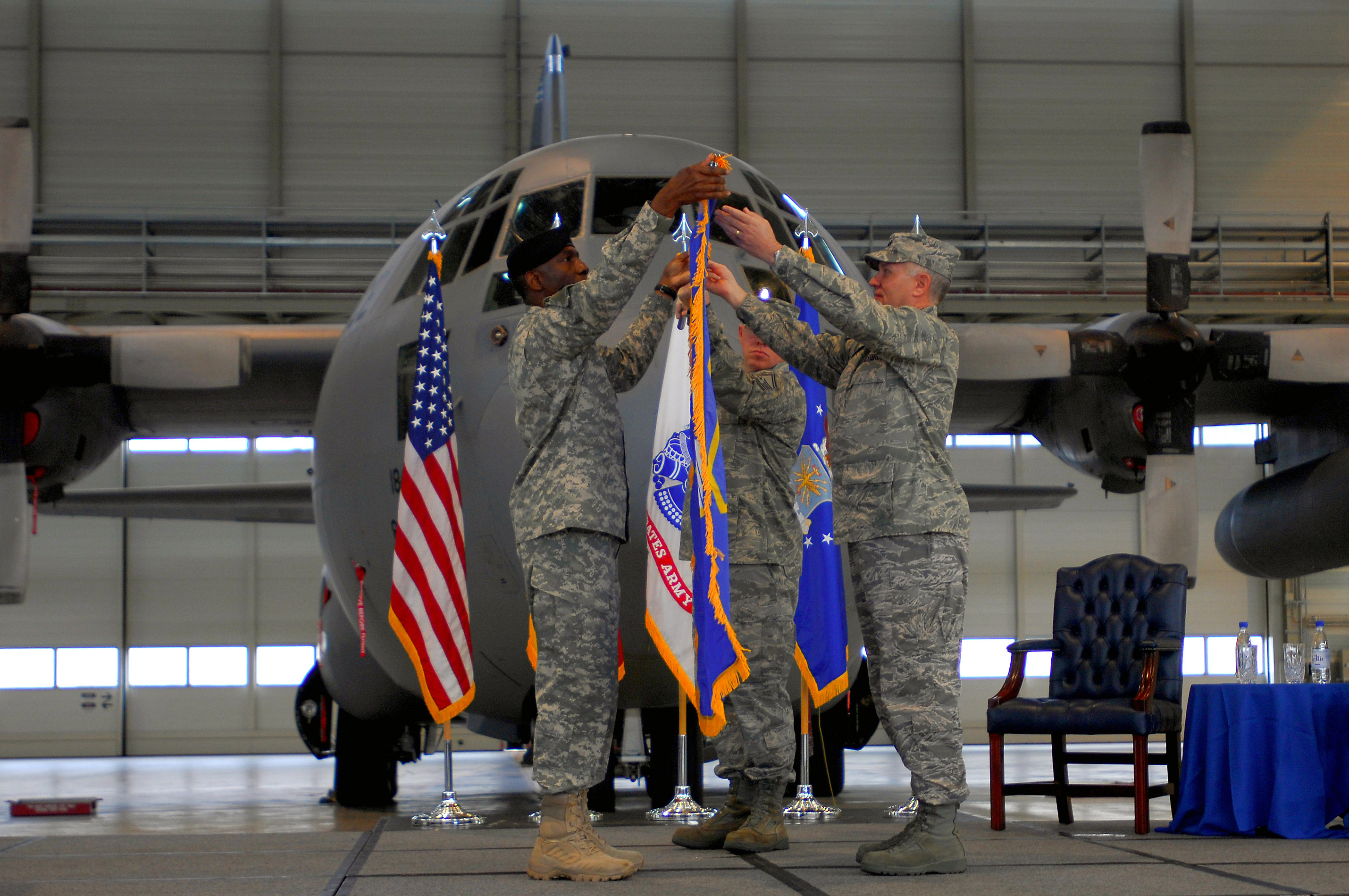
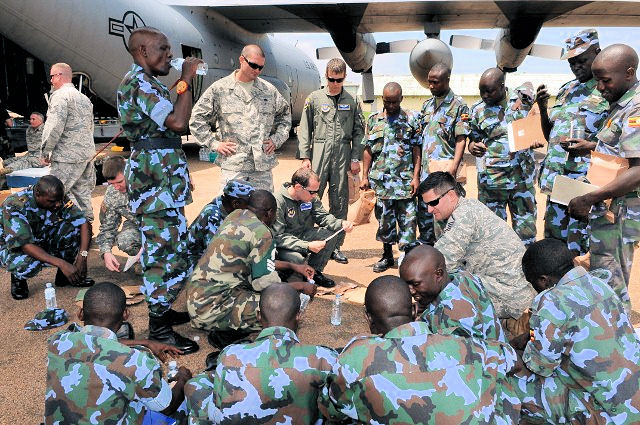
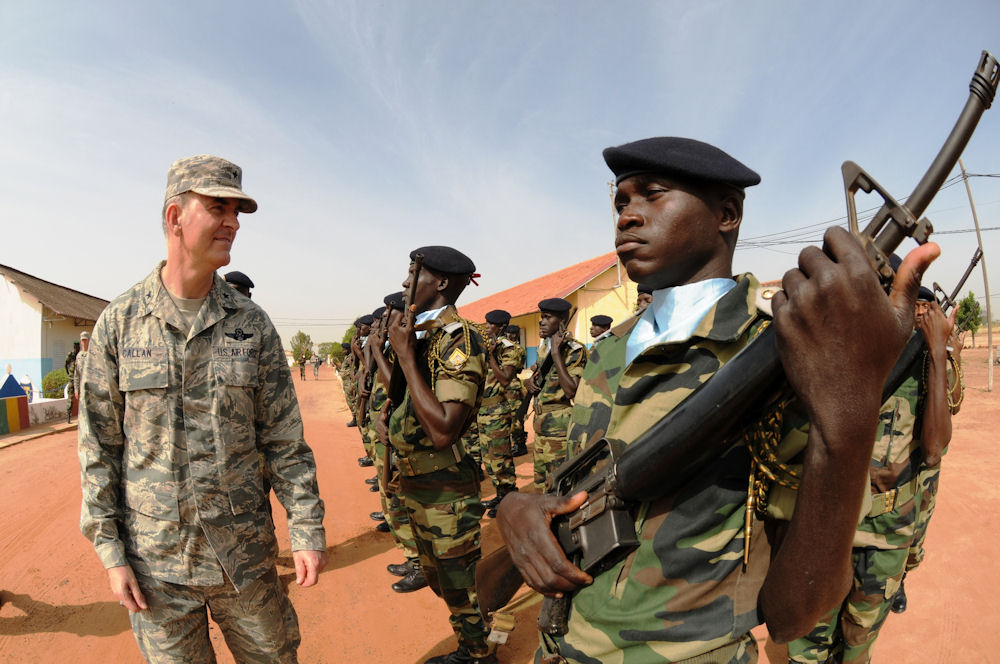
- Army General William E. "Kip" Ward (left), U.S. Africa Command commander, and Maj. Gen. Ronald R. Ladnier, commander of Seventeenth Air Force, unfurl the Seventeenth Air Force's guidon during an assumption-of-command ceremony at Ramstein Air Base, Germany. SSgt. Josh Woolridge,37th Airlift Squadron loadmaster, and MSgt. Garrick Lewis, drop zone support lead for Seventeenth Air Force, explain how to "cook" meals-ready-to-eat to members of the Ugandan Peoples Defense Forces Members of the Senegal 3d Infantry Brigade Honor Platoon greet 17 AF Commander Brig. Gen. Mike Callan
- Active: 17 April 1953 – 30 September 1996; 1 October 2008 – 24 April 2012 (as Seventeenth Air Force); 21 May 2012 – 19 July 2018
- Country: United States of America
- Branch: United States Air Force
- Type: Expeditionary Numbered Air Force
- Role: Provide combat-ready air forces to U.S. European Command and U.S. Africa Command
- Part of: United States Air Forces in Europe - Air Forces Africa
- Garrison/HQ: Rabat-Sale, Morocco (1953–1956); Wheelus Air Base Libya (1956–1959); Ramstein Air Base West Germany (1959–1973); Sembach Air Base Germany (1973–1996); Ramstein Air Base Germany (2008–2012)

Insignia
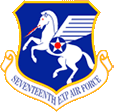
- Seventeenth Expeditionary Air Force emblem

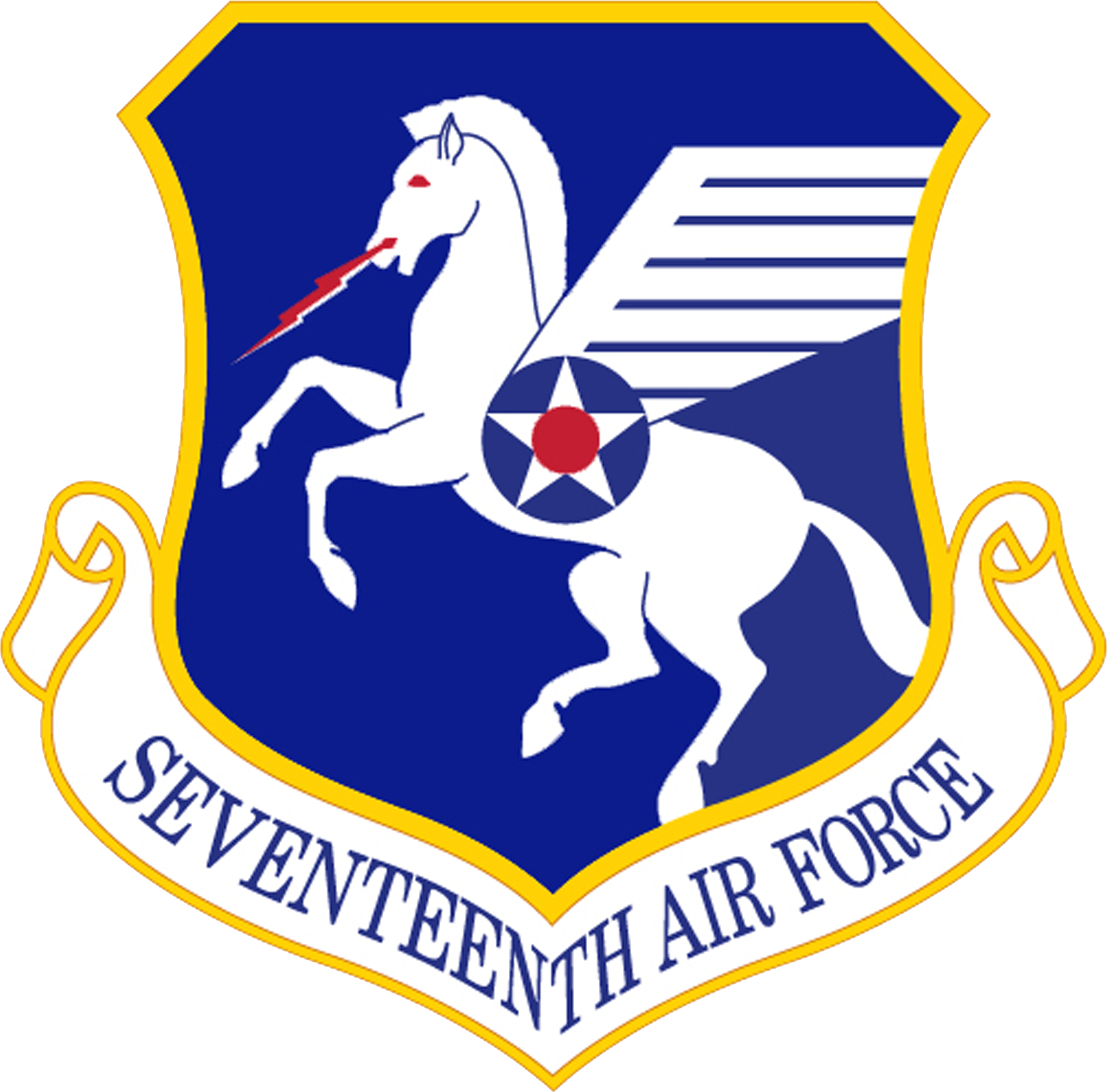
- Seventeenth Air Force emblem

The Seventeenth Expeditionary Air Force (17 EAF) was a numbered air force of the United States Air Force located at Ramstein Air Base, Germany. The command served the United States Air Forces in Europe during 1953–1996 and United States Air Forces Africa during 2008–2012. Upon reactivation on 1 October 2008, it became the air and space component of United States Africa Command. In this capacity, Seventeenth Air Force was referred to as U.S. Air Forces Africa (AFAFRICA). 17 AF was reformed in April 2012 to become the 17th Expeditionary Air Force, sharing a commander and headquarters with the Third Air Force. As of March 2022, the Third Air Force is USAFE-AFAFRICA's sole numbered air force, with the 17 EAF having been inactivated in July 2018.

Seventeenth Air Force housed the traditional A-staff and special staff functions which are responsible for developing strategy and plans to execute air and space operations in support of U.S. Africa Command objectives. In addition, 17 AF housed the "tailored" 617th Air and Space Operations Center (AOC) which provided command and control capabilities for the planning and execution of aerial missions on the African continent. Seventeenth Air Force also had a collaborative relationship with the 110th Air Operations Group, Michigan Air National Guard.

== History ==
=== Cold War ===
The establishment of the North Atlantic Treaty Organization (NATO) in 1949, increased USAFE's responsibilities. Seventeenth Air Force was thus established on 17 April 1953 and then activated on 25 April 1953 at Rabat, Morocco. The 316th Air Division was part of the 17th AF and headquartered at Site 11 outside Sale across from the French Airbase in the Cork forest. Seventeenth Air Force operated throughout North Africa, Portugal, Austria, the Middle East, Pakistan, India, Ceylon and the Mediterranean islands. Seventeenth Air Force had been solely assigned to U.S. Air Forces, Europe, throughout its existence.

Seventeenth Air Force was moved to Wheelus Air Base, Libya, on 1 August 1956 as the command expanded into Italy, Greece, and Turkey. The command exchanged its support mission for the defensive and offensive air missions in Central Europe in 1959.

The headquarters was then relocated in November 1959 to Ramstein AB, West Germany. At Ramstein, Seventeenth Air Force exchanged its support mission in the southern region for the defensive and offensive air mission in central Europe. The command's inventory included more than 500 tactical and 150 support aircraft operating from bases in West Germany, France, the Netherlands and Italy. After the 1961 Berlin Crisis and a USAFE headquarters reorganization, 17 AF assumed responsibility for five bases in Great Britain from Third Air Force.

During the 1972 USAFE reorganization, CINCUSAFE moved his headquarters across Germany from Lindsey Air Station to Ramstein Air Base. To accommodate USAFE HQ, 17 AF relocated to Sembach Air Base, West Germany, in October 1972.

In the 1980s, Seventeenth Air Force saw the number of its subordinate units almost double. Its area of responsibility included three of the Ground Launched Cruise Missile sites in Europe. In 1985, for the first time ever, Seventeenth Air Force brought together all European-based electronic warfare aircraft under a single command when it activated the 65th Air Division and the 66th Electronic Combat Wing at Sembach Air Base. All of these units were inactivated in the early 1990s.

The air bases at Hahn, Bitburg, Wiesbaden and Zweibrücken were closed by USAFE and turned over to the German government in 1993 and Soesterberg to the Dutch government in 1994. Rhein-Main was closed at the end of 2005, its logistics missions being transferred to Ramstein and Spangdahlem.

Seventeenth Air Force was inactivated effective 30 September 1996, due to reductions in force after the Cold War.

==== Structure in 1989 ====
Seventeenth Air Force bases in Rhineland-Palatinate 1989

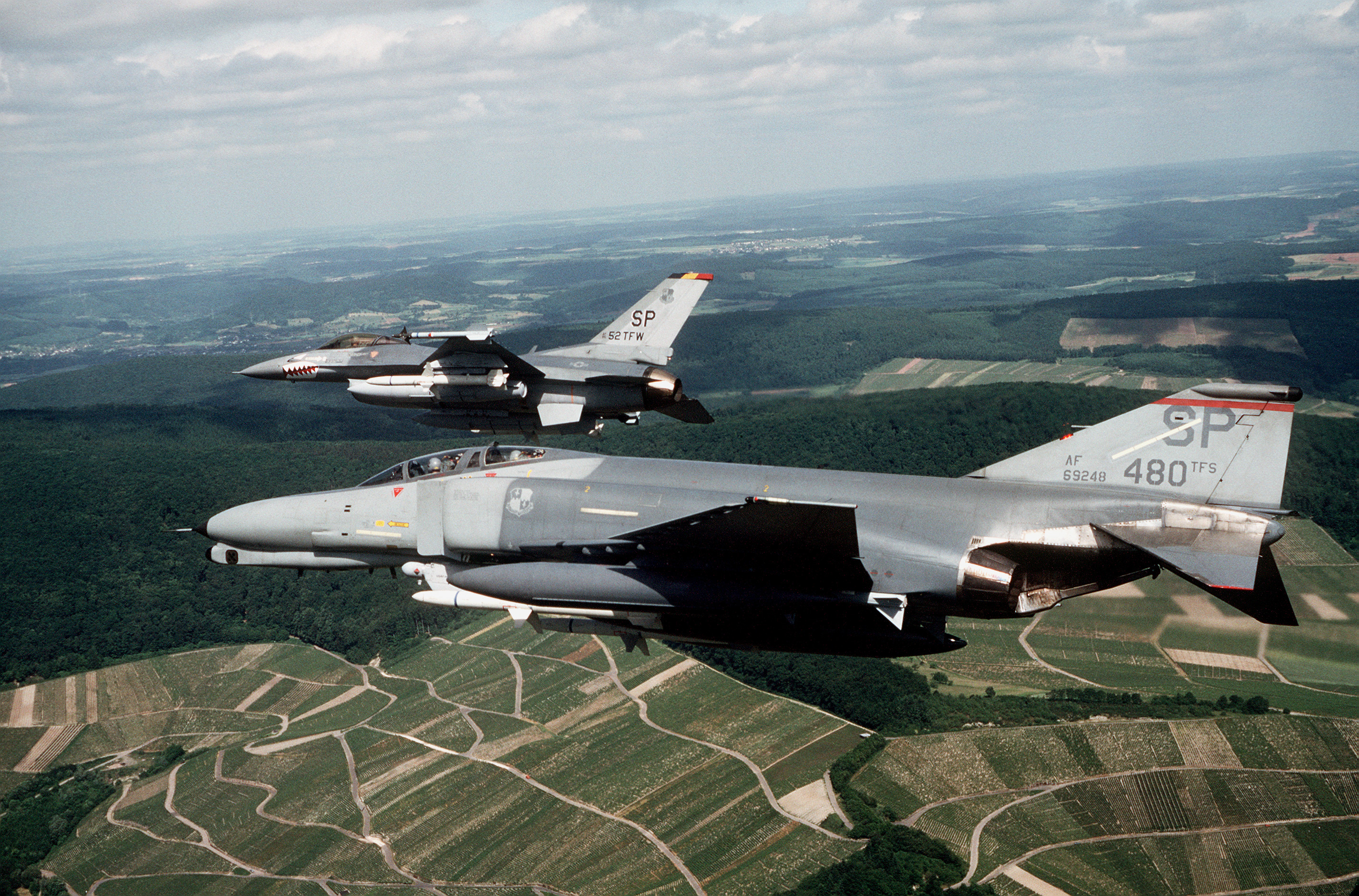
A F-4G Phantom II Wild Weasel from 480th Tactical Fighter Squadron and a F-16C Block 25 Falcon from 52d Tactical Fighter Wing Commander fly over Germany in June 1989

At the end of the Cold War Seventeenth Air Force consisted of the following units, which in case of war with the Warsaw Pact would have come under Fourth Allied Tactical Air Force:

- Seventeenth Air Force, at Sembach Air Base
  - 65th Air Division, at Lindsey Air Station
    - 52d Tactical Fighter Wing, at Spangdahlem Air Base
      - 23d Tactical Fighter Squadron, with 12× F-4G Phantom II Wild Weasel and 12× F-16C Block 25 Falcon
      - 81st Tactical Fighter Squadron, with 12× F-4G Phantom II Wild Weasel and 12× F-16C Block 25 Falcon
      - 480th Tactical Fighter Squadron, with 12× F-4G Phantom II Wild Weasel and 12× F-16C Block 25 Falcon
    - 66th Electronic Combat Wing, at Sembach Air Base
      - 42d Electronic Combat Squadron, detached to Third Air Force at RAF Upper Heyford, UK
      - 43d Electronic Combat Squadron, with EC-130H Compass Call
  - 316th Air Division, at Ramstein Air Base
    - 86th Tactical Fighter Wing, at Ramstein Air Base
      - 512th Tactical Fighter Squadron, with 24× F-16C Block 30 Falcon
      - 526th Tactical Fighter Squadron, with 24× F-16C Block 30 Falcon
    - 377th Combat Support Wing, at Ramstein Air Base
  - 26th Tactical Reconnaissance Fighter Wing, at Zweibrücken Air Base
    - 38th Tactical Reconnaissance Squadron, with 22× RF-4C Phantom II
  - 36th Tactical Fighter Wing, at Bitburg Air Base
    - 22d Tactical Fighter Squadron, with 24× F-15C Eagle
    - 53d Tactical Fighter Squadron, with 24× F-15C Eagle
    - 525th Tactical Fighter Squadron, with 24× F-15C Eagle
  - 50th Tactical Fighter Wing, at Hahn Air Base
    - 10th Tactical Fighter Squadron, with F-16C Block 25 Falcon
    - 313th Tactical Fighter Squadron, with F-16C Block 25 Falcon
    - 496th Tactical Fighter Squadron, with F-16C Block 25 Falcon
  - 38th Tactical Missile Wing, at Pydna Missile Base, Germany
    - 89th Tactical Missile Squadron, with 96× BGM-109G Ground Launched Cruise Missiles
  - 485th Tactical Missile Wing, at Florennes Air Base, Belgium
    - 71st Tactical Missile Squadron, with 48× BGM-109G Ground Launched Cruise Missiles
  - 486th Tactical Missile Wing, at Woensdrecht Air Base, Netherlands, 48× BGM-109G Ground Launched Cruise Missiles were assigned to Woensdrecht, but none were deployed by 1989
  - 601st Tactical Control Wing, at Sembach Air Base (operating AN/TPS-43 mobile radars)
  - 7100th Combat Support Wing, at Lindsey Air Station
    - 7100th Supply Squadron
    - 7100th Transportation Squadron
    - 7100th Comptroller Squadron
    - 7100th Combat Support Wing Medical Center – Wiesbaden (GE), Medical Center Compound
      - 18th Aeromedical Staging Flight
    - 610th USAF Contingency Hospital – Lindsey AS (GE)
    - 652d USAF Contingency Hospital – Donaueschingen (GE), Donaueschingen Contingency Hospital Annex
    - 653d USAF Contingency Hospital – Wiesbaden (GE)
    - 7261st Munitions Support Squadron – Memmingerberg (GE), Fliegerhorst Memmingen (special weapons storage and maintenance)
    - 7361st Munitions Support Squadron – Kleine Brogel Air Base, Belgium (special weapons storage and maintenance)
    - 7362d Munitions Support Squadron – Volkel Air Base, Netherlands (special weapons storage and maintenance)
    - 7501st Munitions Support Squadron – Alflen (GE), Fliegerhorst Büchel (special weapons storage and maintenance)
    - 7502d Munitions Support Squadron – Nörvenich (GE), Fliegerhorst Nörvenich (special weapons storage and maintenance)
  - 4th Air Support Operations Group, in Frankfurt am Main (Liaison with V US Corps)
  - 8th Air Support Operations Group, in Stuttgart (Liaison with VII US Corps)
  - 32d Tactical Fighter Squadron, with 24× F-15C Eagle at Soesterberg Air Base, Netherlands
  - 7104th Air Base Group, at Chièvres Air Base, Belgium

=== Under AFRICOM ===
It was announced on 12 September 2008 that Seventeenth Air Force would be reactivated, to be headquartered at Ramstein Air Base, located west of Kaiserslautern in the German federal state of Rhineland-Palatinate. It was to form part of United States Africa Command. The stand-up ceremony occurred on 18 September 2008, under the command of Major General Ron Ladnier. It was officially reactivated by the Air Force on 1 October 2008. In this capacity, it was subordinate to the United States Air Forces in Europe, and be referred to by its componency name: Air Forces Africa (AFAFRICA).

Air Forces Africa conducts sustained security engagement and operations as directed to promote air safety, security and development on the African continent. Through Theater Security Cooperation (TSC) events, Air Forces Africa carries out U.S. Africa Command's policy of seeking long-term partnership with the African Union and regional organizations as well as individual states on the continent. The 409th Air Expeditionary Group supervised drone reconnaissance and possibly strike operations, including from Arba Minch in Ethiopia. AFAFRICA works with the State Department and the U.S. Agency for International Development, to assist African states in developing their national and regional security institutions to promote security and stability and facilitate development.

AFAFRICA includes at least two air expeditionary groups. The 449th Air Expeditionary Group, Camp Lemonnier, Djibouti provides combat search and rescue for the Combined Joint Task Force - Horn of Africa. It consists of HC-130Ps from the 81st Expeditionary Rescue Squadron, and pararescuemen from the 82nd Expeditionary Rescue Squadron. The 404th Air Expeditionary Group is co-located with AFAFRICA at Ramstein. During contingency operations, the group forward-deploys to facilitate air and support operations for varied missions on the continent, ranging from humanitarian airlift to presidential support. The 404 AEG deployed to Rwanda in January 2009 to provide airlift for peacekeeping equipment in support of the United Nations African Union Mission in Darfur. In July 2009, the 404 AEG deployed to Ghana to provide aerial port and aircraft maintenance teams, along with forward communications, early warning and air domain safety and security elements for U.S. President Barack Obama's visit.

In June 2010, Brigadier General Margaret H. Woodward took command of Seventeenth Air Force. Seventeenth Air Force directed the U.S. air involvement in the 2011 military intervention in Libya, dubbed Operation Odyssey Dawn, before command of the whole operation was transferred to NATO.

As of 13 January 2010, the Secretary of the Air Force Michael Donley announced that the 617th AOC will be consolidated with the 603d Air and Space Operations Center (according to AFA reporting).

Seventeenth Air Force was inactivated in April 2012 as part of an Air Force cost savings effort. United States Air Forces in Europe (USAFE) assumed the former staff functions of Seventeenth Air Force, while the Third Air Force and the 603d Air and Space Operations Center (603 AOC) assumed responsibility for USAFRICOM air operations, with the 603 AOC absorbing the former 617th Air Operations Center.

It was redesignated as the Seventeenth Expeditionary Air Force, reactivated, and assigned to United States Air Forces in Europe - Air Forces Africa from May 2012 until July 2018.

=== Lineage ===
- Established as Seventeenth Air Force on 17 Apr 1953

Organized 25 Apr 1953
Inactivated on 30 September 1996

- Reactivated on 1 October 2008

Assumed joint designation Air Forces Africa, 1 October 2008
Inactivated on 24 April 2012

- Redesignated Seventeenth Expeditionary Air Force and reactivated 21 May 2012

Inactivated on 19 July 2018

=== Assignments ===
- United States Air Forces in Europe, 25 April 1953 - 30 September 1996;
- United States Air Forces Africa, 1 October 2008 - 24 April 2012
- United States Air Forces in Europe - Air Forces Africa, 21 May 2012 - 19 July 2018

=== Components ===
Divisions

- 65th Air Division, Lindsey AS, West Germany (later Germany)

1 June 1985 – 30 June 1991

- 316th Air Division, Ramstein AB, West Germany (later Germany)

14 June 1985 – 1 May 1991

- 7217th Air Division, Ankara AS, Turkey

7 August – 15 November 1959

Wings

- 26th Tactical Reconnaissance Wing,

1 October 1966 – 31 January 1973, Ramstein AB, West Germany
31 January 1973 – 31 July 1991, Zweibrücken AB, West Germany (later Germany)

- 32d Tactical Fighter Squadron, Soesterberg AB, Netherlands

15 November 1959 – 1 September 1966
30 June 1991 – 31 March 1992

- 36th Tactical Fighter Wing, Bitburg AB, West Germany (later Germany)

15 November 1959 – 1 September 1966
30 June 1991 – 1 October 1991

- 38th Tactical Missile Wing

15 November 1959 – 25 September 1966 Sembach Air Base, West Germany
1 April 1985 – 22 August 1990 Wueschheim AS, West Germany

- 50th Tactical Fighter Wing, Hahn AB, West Germany (later Germany)

15 November 1959 – 30 September 1991

- 52d Tactical Fighter Wing, Spangdahlem AB, West Germany (later Germany)

31 December 1971 – 1 June 1985
30 June 1991 – 31 July 1996

- 66th Electronic Combat Wing, Sembach AB, West Germany (later Germany)

15 November 1959 – 1 September 1966
30 June 1991 – 31 March 1992

- 86th Tactical Fighter Wing, Ramstein AB, West Germany (later Germany)

15 November 1959 – 1 July 1963
1 September 1963 – 20 May 1965
5 October – 14 November 1968
1 November 1969 – 14 June 1985
1 May 1991 – 31 July 1996

- 377th Combat Support Wing, Ramstein AB, West Germany (later Germany)

1985 – 1 October 1991

- 486th Tactical Missile Wing, Woensdrecht AS, Netherlands

August 1987 (Activated, never equipped. Inactivated almost immediately)

- 601st Tactical Control Wing, Sembach AB, West Germany (later Germany)

1 July 1968 – 1 October 1993

- 7100th Combat Support Wing, Lindsey AS, West Germany (later Germany)

15 November 1959 – 15 April 1985

=== Stations ===
- Rabat-Sale, French Morocco (later, Morocco), 17 April 1953
- Wheelus Air Base, Libya, 1 August 1956
- Ramstein Air Base, West Germany, 15 November 1959
- Sembach Air Base, West Germany (later Germany), October 1972 – 30 September 1996
- Ramstein Air Base, Germany, 1 October 2008 – 24 April 2012
