= 601st Tactical Control Wing =

601st Tactical Control Wing

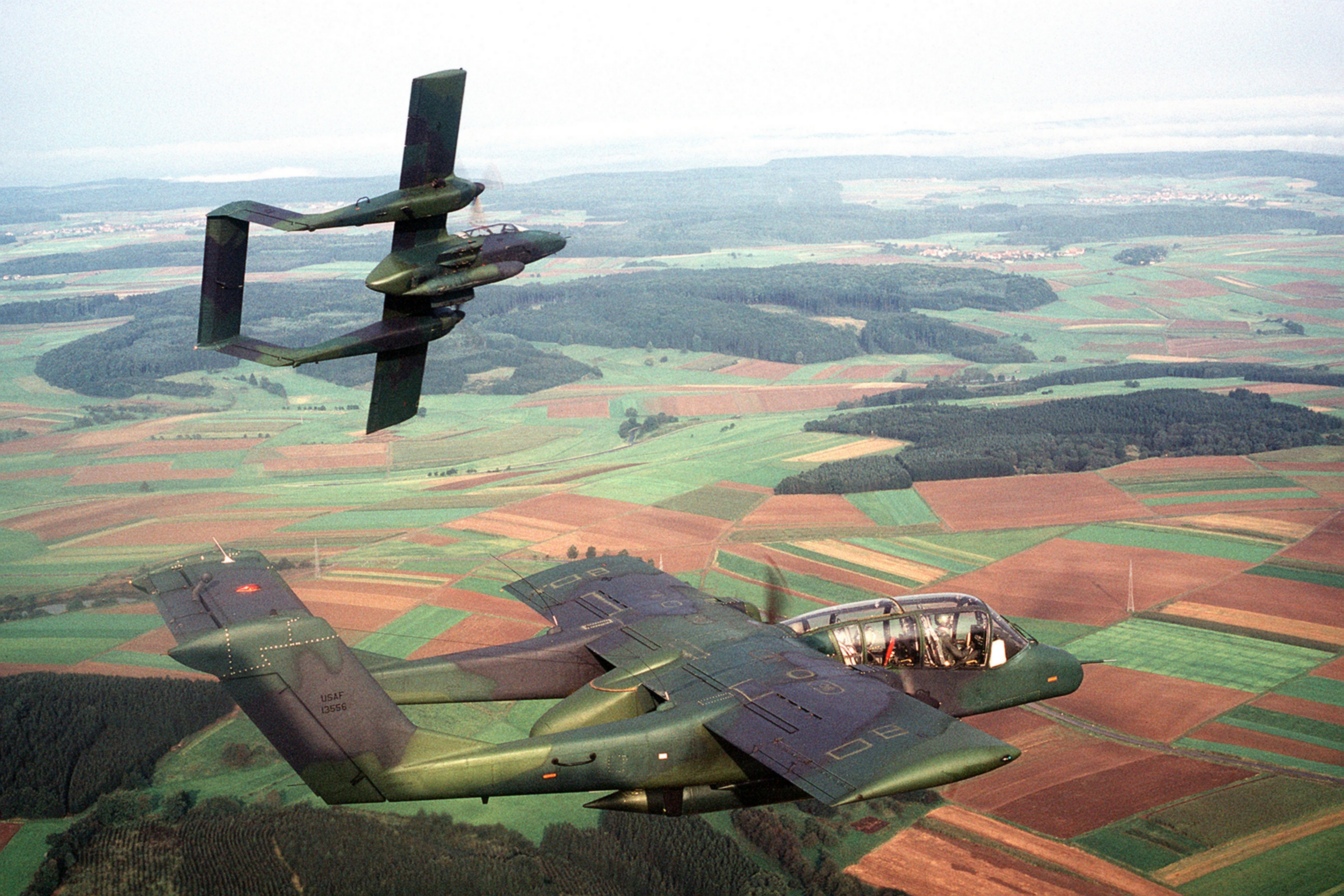
- Wing OV-10As over Germany in 1982
- Active: 1968–1995
- Country: United States
- Branch: United States Air Force
- Role: Expeditionary base support
- Part of: United States Air Forces Europe
- Decorations: Air Force Outstanding Unit Award with Combat "V" Device; Air Force Outstanding Unit Award

Insignia
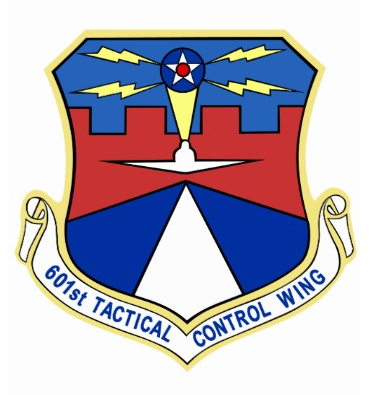
- 601st Tactical Control Wing emblem (approved 13 August 1968)

The 601st Air Expeditionary Wing is a provisional United States Air Force organization. It was last active as the 601st Air Base Wing with the Seventeenth Air Force at Sembach Air Base, Germany, where it was inactivated on 31 March 1995.

The wing was first activated as the 601st Tactical Control Wing at Sembach in July 1968, when it replaced the 601st Tactical Control Group as the headquarters for Seventeenth Air Force's tactical control units and the 603d Air Base Wing as the host organization for Sembach. For most of its existence, the unit controlled elements of the Tactical Air Control System (Note: The Tactical Air Control (System 407L) was developed in the 1960s by the United States Air Force as a mobile system to provide semi-automatic command and control of forces and to interface with Army and Naval Forces. It incorporated Aircraft Control and Warning, Tactical Air Support, Air Traffic Control and Command Communications subsystems. Study of the U.S.A.F. Tactical Control System, pp. 1–2) in Germany. In 1973, the wing moved to Wiesbaden Air Base, but it returned to Sembach in November 1975. Its mission changed in 1992 to supporting Air Force units at Sembach and elsewhere in Germany and it was inactivated in 1995.

The wing was converted to provisional status in February 2001 and assigned to United States Air Forces Europe to activate or inactivate as required, but there have been no reports of its activation as an expeditionary unit.

== History ==
Through much of its history the mission of the wing was to provide an effective tactical air control system for United States Air Forces in Europe and Allied Air Forces Central Europe. The wing employed a mobile radar network and forward air control flying operations. The wing controlled offensive missions against ground targets and defensive missions for air-to-air intercepts, later interfacing with Airborne Warning and Control System aircraft.

=== Background ===
The 601st Tactical Control Group was activated at Sembach Air Base, Germany in 1965. Its staff was composed of personnel from the former 601st Tactical Control Squadron. The 603d Air Base Wing had provided support to all units at Sembach since September 1966, when the 38th Combat Support Group was inactivated as part of the draw down of the 38th Tactical Missile Wing's CGM-13B Mace missiles in Germany.

The 60lst Tactical Control Wing was organized at Sembach on 1 July 1968. The new wing assumed the missions of the 601st Tactical Control Group and 603d Air Base Wing, which were inactivated. On 14 November 1968, the 86th Air Division at Ramstein Air Base, which controlled United States air defense units in Germany, was inactivated. Three of its aircraft control and warning squadrons were transferred to the wing at the beginning of the month, although the 602d Aircraft Control and Warning Squadron at Giebelstadt was inactivated and its mission assumed by a German Air Force radar at Lauda. Detachments of the wing were also organized at fixed radar sites operated by the German Air Force. Another detachment was organized at Ramstein to provide a central maintenance facility for these units. (Note: The former 86th Air Division units operated European Aircraft Control and Warning System (System 412L) fixed radars. System 412L began its deployment to both United States and German Air Force sites in 1965. Siso, p. 5.) (Note: The Ramstein 412L maintenance facility was combined with the 407L maintenance operation at Sembach in February 1969. 601 TCW Chronology, 1968–1986, p. 47.)

=== Fixed radar systems ===
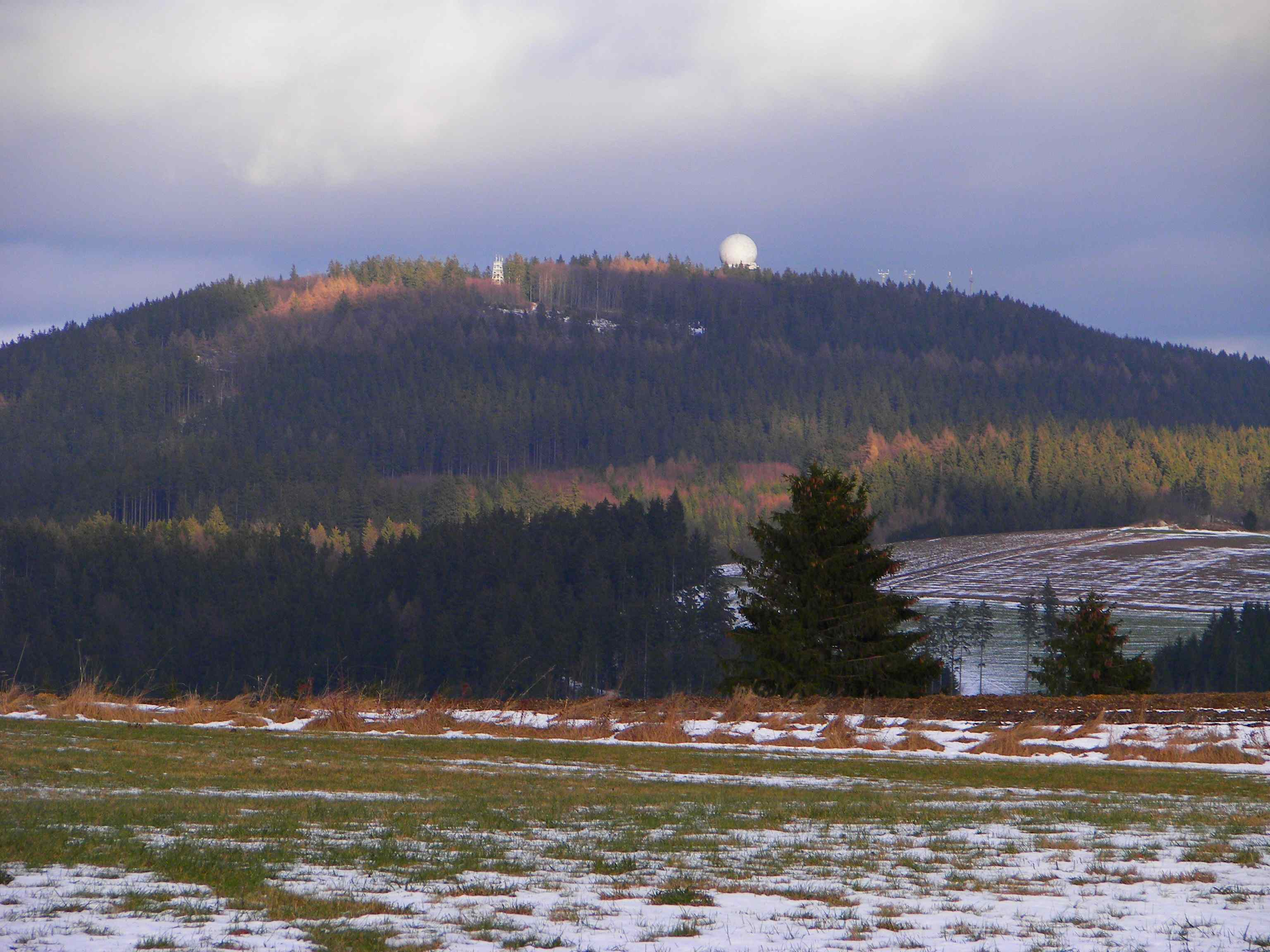
Dobraberg fixed radar site

The long term goal was to transfer operation of the 412L fixed radar sites entirely to German Air Force operation. However, it was not until 1972 that the German Air Force agreed to assume operation of the radar sites at Dobraberg Air Station and Wasserkuppe Air Station. Dobraberg was transferred on 1 July 1974, six months ahead of the agreed date. Maintenance of the remaining site at Wasserkuppe was transferred to a civilian contractor and on 1 January 1979 the Wasserkuppe site was turned over to the German Air Force and the wing's last aircraft control and warning squadron operating a fixed control and reporting post (Note: Control and reporting posts performed surveillance and early warning and controlled aircraft using radar and radio communications. Siso, p. 3) was inactivated. In September 1980 the 412L system was replaced by the German Air Defense Ground Environment system. The 615th Aircraft Control and Warning Squadron continued to operate a combined control and reporting center (Note: In addition to the functions of a control and reporting post, control and reporting centers supervised one or more control and reporting posts and identified targets. They had the authority to commit air defenses by scrambling interceptors to identify potentially hostile aircraft. Siso, p. 3) until 1980, when it was inactivated.

=== Mobile radar systems ===
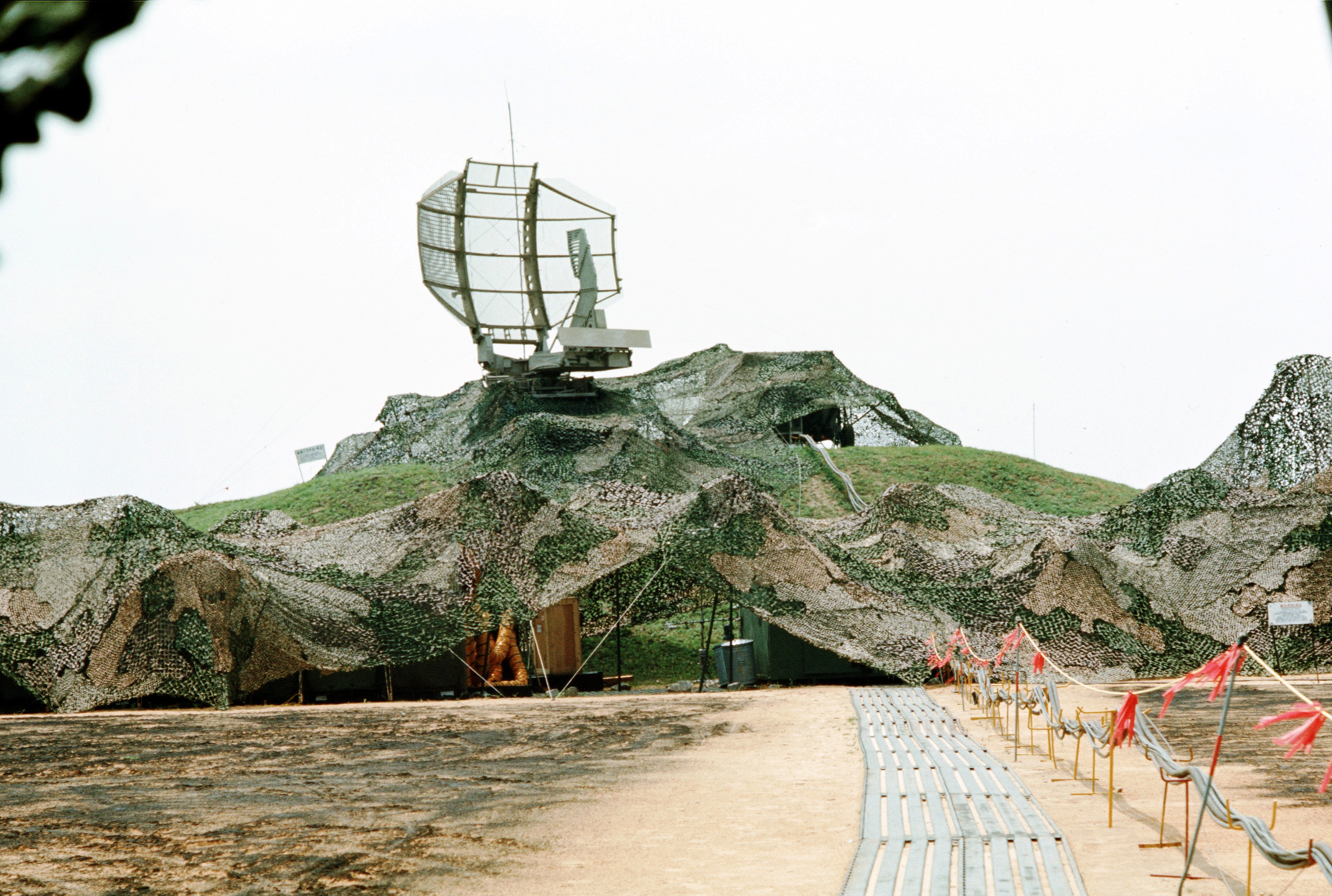
Camouflaged AN/TPS-43 radar

AN/TRC-97 in use in Germany

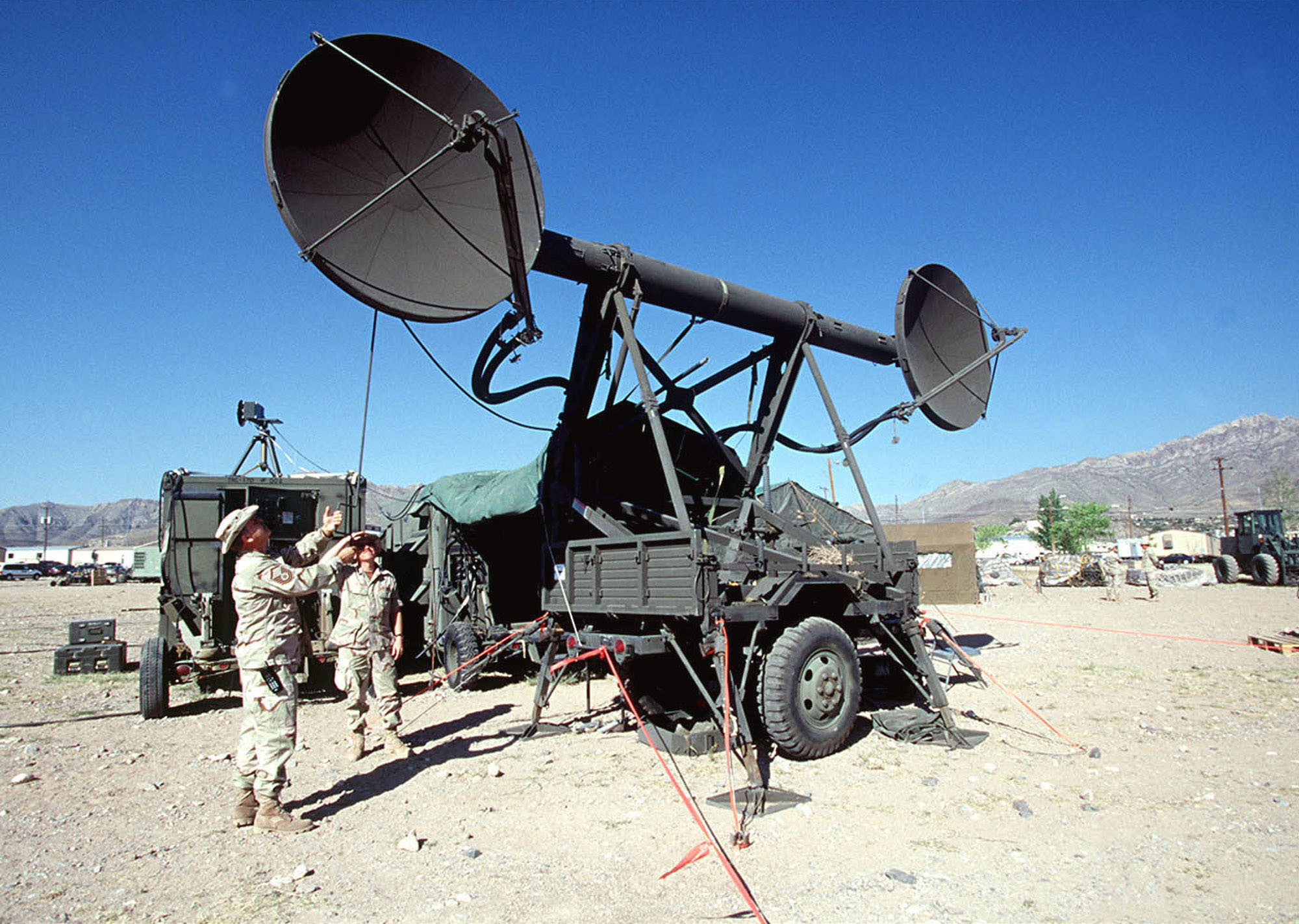
AN/TRC-170

Upgrades to the wing's mobile radars began soon after activation The new two dimensional AN/TPS-44 radar to be used at Forward Air Control Posts (Note: Forward Air Control Post were radar elements in forward combat areas to provide control of tactical missions. Handoff of aircraft to forward air controllers in a target area was also another function of this element. They had the capability for limited intercept and airspace control. "The 1970's [sic] Tactical Air Control System (TACS)". mobileradar.org. p. 3.) became operational in November 1968. In June 1969, wing Control and Reporting Posts accepted their first AN/TPS-43, three dimensional radar. (Note: Two dimensional radars determine the distance and relative bearing of a target from the radar. If the target's altitude is to be known, a separate height finder radar must be added. Three dimensional radars provide distance, bearing and altitude. Wolff, Christian. "RadarBasics: Air Defense Radars". radartutorial.eu.) However, problems arose which precluded the upgrades from being completed quickly. Lacking a firm delivery date for the radar to be used for training, Air Training Command could not establish start date for training to begin. Also, an interface kit was required to allow the use of the AN/TPS-43 until the wing received the new AN/TSQ-91V Operations Centrals with were not expected to be delivered until 1971. (Note: These were not received until February 1972.) Radar sites were linked together by AN/TRC-97 wideband radios. This set provided line of sight, point-to-point communications in the German countryside. The AN/TRC-97 was eventually replaced by the digital AN/TRC-170 radio, which required substantially less maintenance.

In 1969 computer programming modifications permitted 4,096 possible transponder codes for friendly aircraft radar identification. This permitted assignment of a unique code to each military aircraft in the Fourth Allied Tactical Air Force region, providing positive identification capability.

In 1976 the 601st Wing expanded its mobile radar coverage to Northern Germany by activating units in the Second Allied Tactical Air Force area of responsibility in Projects Creek North and Creek Control. By year's end, the wing's mobile network grew by 40 percent. The first new sites in this expansion were at Hessisch Oldendorf Air Station, Bad Muender and Schwelentrup. Equipment for these sites came from a tactical control unit at Cannon Air Force Base, New Mexico and from Air National Guard units in Connecticut and Massachusetts.

These first three new sites were a former Royal Netherlands Air Force Hawk missile battery headquarters and two of its satellite missile launch sites. The 609th Tactical Control Squadron and 6l9th Tactical Control Flight were activated at Bad Muender and Schwelentrup respectively on 1 April 1976. A month later, on 1 May 1976, the 629th Tactical Control Flight was also activated at Schwelentrup. A little less than a year later Project Creek Brahman activated three more radar units at Carl Schurz Kaserne near Bremerhaven.

=== Forward air control ===
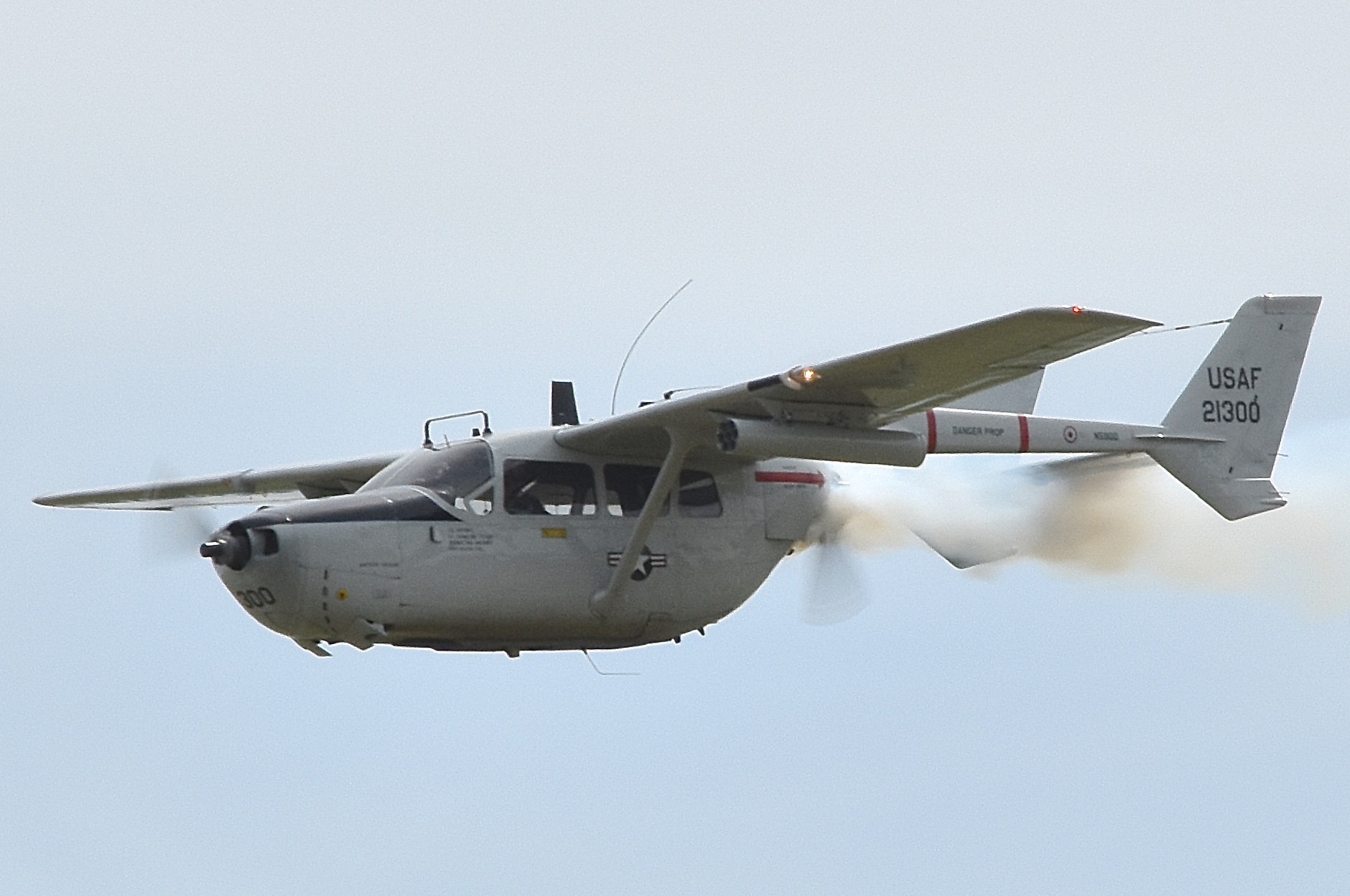
Cessna O-2A Skymaster

On 15 February 1970, the wing acquired another mission with the arrival of three Cessna O-2A Skymaster aircraft and an airborne Forward Air Control capability. The use of airborne forward air controllers was a new concept of operations for tactical air forces in Europe. The wing was assigned operational control of these aircraft, which flew from Ramstein Air Base, but that the 26th Tactical Reconnaissance Wing would be responsible for their maintenance and ground support. The first operational flight of a wing O-2A occurred on 2 March. Nine days later, the wing deployed its Skymasters to Italy for Operation Dawn Patrol 70. The O-2s remained at Ramstein until joining the wing at Wiesbaden on 16 July 1973. In October 1973 the Skymasters were organized into the 20th Tactical Air Support Squadron

In July 1974, the 601st Tactical Air Support Squadron (Helicopter) joined the 20th Squadron in the 601st Tactical Air Support Group in preparation for the arrival of Sikorsky CH-53 helicopters. However, the wing's first CH-53C would not arrive until six months later. The wing's first two helicopters arrived on 15 January 1975, and flying operations commenced on 6 February. Five additional CH-53Cs were received during the last two months of the year.

On 21 June 1974, the wing's first two North American OV-10 Bronco aircraft were ferried to Wiesbaden Air Base from Hurlburt Field, Florida, where they were assigned to the 20th Squadron. Flying operations began on 12 July and three months later, on 10 October 1974, the 20th Squadron flew the first OV-10A forward air control mission during Exercise Certain Pledge. Additional OV-10As arrived from Thailand and, on 18 December 1974, O-2A flying operations terminated and the last Skymaster was transferred to the United States Army. Twelve additional OV-10As arrived at Wiesbaden in August 1975, followed by 10 more two months later.

On 4 July 1976, a second Bronco squadron, the 704th Tactical Air Support Squadron was activated at Sembach. Second, on 1 November 1976, wing OV-10A aircraft, pilots from the 20th TASS, and maintenance personnel from the 601st Consolidated Aircraft Maintenance Squadron deployed to Zaragoza Air Base, Spain for a four-month weapons training detachment deployment nicknamed "Creek Tally". This was the first time wing aircraft deployed to Spain for this type training. In a related operation, the 611th Tactical Control Flight also deployed their Forward Air Control Posts to Zaragoza at the same time. While there, the 611th provided radar and radio coverage for dissimilar air combat training missions between Northrop F-5E Tiger IIs of the 527th Tactical Fighter Training Aggressor Squadron and McDonnell F-4 Phantom IIs. Also, the 611th Tactical Control Flight was airlifted in two Lockheed C-5A Galaxies rather than the Lockheed C-130 Hercules or Lockheed C-141 Starlifters normally used for radar airborne movements.

The major aircraft related event of 1977 involved the arrival of four additional OV-10As from the states on 9 September 1977. Also, the first two wing OV-10As to receive camouflage painting returned to Sembach from Alverca, Portugal, where the work was performed. In 1980, The 601st Tactical Air Support Group gained additional CH-53Cs and OV-10As.

Due to a congressionally-imposed European troop strength ceiling, all 45 wing OV-10A aircraft along with approximately 800 support personnel of both flying squadrons (the 20th and 704th Tactical Air Support Squadrons) and much of the maintenance complex returned to the states during the period 5 June 1984 through 29 August 1984. The 45 OV-10A aircraft previously assigned to the wing were now assigned to the 27th Tactical Air Support Squadron at George Air Force Base, California, and the wing's two Bronco squadrons (the 20th and 704th TASS) were inactivated on 30 September 1984.

=== Base support ===
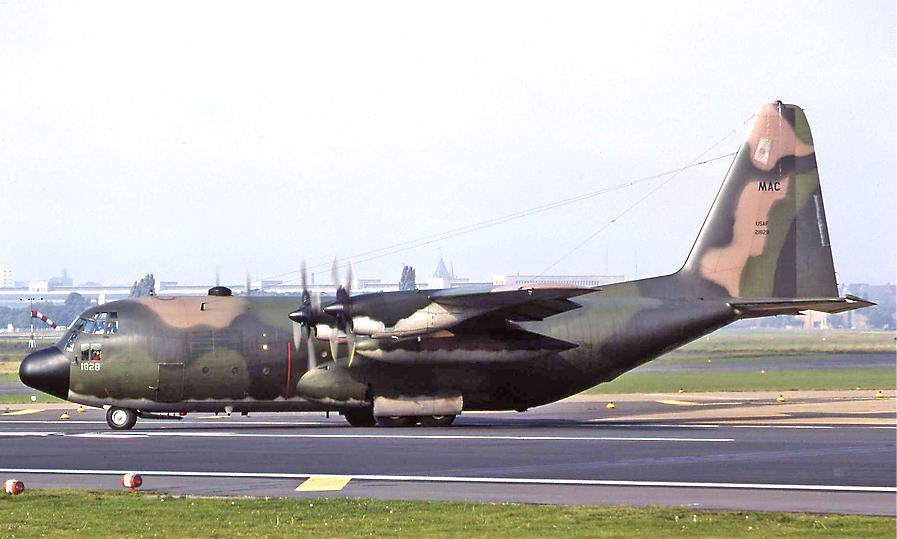
7405th Operations Squadron C-130E at Rhein-Main AB

The 601st Wing moved to Wiesbaden Air Base on 1 June 1973. Wing headquarters and tactical air control operations and maintenance units at Sembach moved to Wiesbaden as units. Support units moved to Wiesbaden without personnel or equipment and assumed the mission of the 7101st Air Base Wing, which was inactivated upon their arrival. The 7400th Air Base Group assumed their personnel to continue the operation of Sembach. By 1 October 1973, the wing's relocation to Wiesbaden was complete.

=== Organization ===
On 1 July 1973 the detachments of the 601st Tactical Control Squadron were replaced by numbered flights and squadrons and the 601st Tactical Air Control Center Squadron replaced the wing detachment operating the tactical air control center. The 601st Tactical Air Support Group was activated to command the wing's forward air control squadrons and the 601st Tactical Control Group was reactivated to command its radar units. In October, the 20th Tactical Air Support Squadron was activated and within a few months, the wing's tactical air control party detachments were transferred to the 20th Squadron.

However, all these events were overshadowed by the announcement, on 8 August 1975, of Project Creek Swap, wherein the wing was notified it would again have to pack its bags and move back to Sembach. Thus, in January 1976, after a two-year stay at Wiesbaden, the wing began its move back to Sembach AB. The first OV-1OA aircraft from Wiesbaden landed at Sembach on 7 January 1976, and Colonel Fleetwood Pride Jr., the wing commander, landed another the next day to officially mark the wing's return to Sembach. By 31 March 1976, the wing's move back to Sembach was largely completed.

Projects Creek North and Creek Swap in 1976 involved the expansion of the group's mobile network into northern Germany and the establishment of new radar stations. The 609th Tactical Control Squadron, with two assigned flights, was activated the spring of May 1976. On 20 September 1976, a second tactical control group, the 600th Tactical Control Group, was activated under the wing to control northern operations, while its 600th Combat Support Squadron provided base support for the new radar units. The 600th Group expanded the following year when the 606th Tactical Control Squadron and two more flights were activated at Carl Schurz Kaserne near Bremerhaven.

On 1 June 1985, The 65th Air Division was activated at Sembach to serve as the headquarters for the 601st and the newly-activated 66th Electronic Combat Wing. As part of this reorganization, the 66th Wing was assigned host wing responsibilities at Sembach which included support of the many geographically separated units of the 601st Wing. The 601st Combat Support Group was inactivated and its mission, personnel and equipment were transferred to the 66th Combat Support Group. The 601st Tactical Control Group was also inactivated and its subordinate units were assigned directly to the wing.

=== Saudi Arabia detachment ===
The War erupted on 22 September 1980. Shortly after, Saudi Arabia requested US assistance to ensure that Saudi Arabian airspace was not violated during the hostilities. Early in October 1980, the 601st Wing was ordered to deploy a survey team to Riyadh to assist in setting up a mobile radar network in Saudi Arabia. Tactical Air Control System elements in the United States dispatched a Forward Air Control Post, an AN/TSQ-91V Control and Reporting Post operations central cell, and a AN/TYC-10 MPC to Saudi Arabia. The radar operation in Saudi Arabia was collectively known as ELF One.

ELF One involved three operating locations set up along the eastern edge of the Arabian peninsula on the coast of the Persian Gulf and in the central city of Riyadh. The Message Processing Center and Boeing E-3 Sentry aircraft operated out of the latter location. The Control and Reporting Post, along with the communications element of the Saudi Arabian Sector Operations Center, was located on Dhahran Air Base, just inland from the eastern coast of Saudi Arabia. The Forward Air Control Post operated out of Al Jubayl, also along the eastern coast of the country. Some 500 personnel were at the three operating locations. The primary mission of this operation was to support the Saudi Arabia through air defense radar surveillance of the Gulf area. The 601st Wing established an ELF One support detachment on 9 October 1980. After 11 April 1981, the detachment was supported by the 602nd Tactical Control Squadron. The detachment in Saudi Arabia was inactivated on 12 February 1986.

In order to meet the Fiscal Year (FY) 1985 and 1986 Department of Defense budget restrictions, the Air Staff directed the reduction of the mobile TACS by two CRPs and four FACPs in two phases. Phase I resulted in the 1 June 1985 inactivation of the 632nd Tactical Control Flight located at Grafenwoehr and the 1 August 1985 inactivation of the 602nd Tactical Control Squadron at Turkheim and the 619th Tactical Control Flight located at Schwelentrup. The second phase of this drawdown resulted in the 1 October 1986 inactivation of the 603rd Tactical Control Squadron at Mehlingen, the 636th Tactical Control Flight and the 62lst Tactical Control Flight at Wanna and Wiesbaden, respectively. The 601st wide range of communications, which had its beginnings in World War II, was heavily tasked in support of operations during Operation Desert Storm and Operation Provide Comfort, starting with the early buildup in the Persian Gulf during August 1990.

=== 601st Air Base Wing ===
The 601st air control units became an Operations Group in March 1992 that resulted in the formation of the 601st Support Wing. In 1993, more than half the 601st air control assets deployed to Italy in support of Operation Deny Flight, the United Nations-sponsored operations that established a no-fly zone over Bosnia-Herzegovina.

The Operations Group was inactivated in October 1993 and when the wing was redesignated as the 601st Air Base Wing. At the time, the wing was responsible for over 40 geographically separated units in combination with over 200 people deployed to more than a dozen locations worldwide.

In 1995 the Sembach flightline was returned to German control and the 601st Air Base Wing was inactivated.

== Lineage ==
- Established as the 601st Tactical Control Wing and activated on 18 January 1968 (not organized)

Organized on 1 July 1968

- Redesignated 601st Support Wing on 1 March 1992
- Redesignated 601st Air Base Wing on 1 October 1993

Inactivated on 31 March 1995

- Converted to provisional status and redesignated 601st Air Expeditionary Wing on 5 February 2001

=== Assignments ===
- United States Air Forces Europe, 18 January 1968 (not organized)
- Seventeenth Air Force, 1 July 1968
- 65th Air Division, 1 June 1985
- Seventeenth Air Force, 31 July 1987 – 31 March 1995
- United States Air Forces Europe to activate or inactivate as required, 5 February 2001

=== Stations ===
- Sembach Air Base, West Germany, 1 July 1968
- Wiesbaden Air Base, West Germany, 1 June 1973
- Sembach Air Base, West Germany, 1 January 1976 – 31 March 1995

=== Components ===
Centers (Note: Components were stationed with wing headquarters, except as noted.)

- 601st Air Support Operations Center (later 601st Air Support Operations Group), 15 March 1984 – 1 June 1985
- 602d Air Support Operations Center (later 602d Air Support Operations Group), 15 March 1984 – 1 June 1985

Groups

- 600th Tactical Control Group, 20 September 1976 – 1 June 1985 Hessisch Oldendorf Air Station, providing C&C to 2ATAF area
- 601st Air Support Operations Group (see 601st Air Support Operations Center)
- 601st Combat Support Group (later 601st Support Group), 1 July 1968 – 1 June 1985 31 March 1992 – 31 March 1995
- 601st Communications Group, 1 October 1982 – c. 1 September 1994
- 601st Logistics Group, 31 March 1992 – 30 December 1993
- 601st Operations Group, 31 March 1992 – 30 December 1993
- 601st Regional Support Group, 1 October 1992 – 1 July 1994
- 601st Tactical Air Support Group, 1 July 1973 – 1 November 1975, 1 May 1977 – 15 October 1985 (not operational after 15 May 1985)
- 601st Tactical Control Group, 1 July 1973 – 1 June 1985
- 602d Air Support Operations Group (see 602d Air Support Operations Center)

==== Squadrons ====
Aircraft Squadrons

- 7th Special Operations Squadron, 15 October 1975 – 1 July 1977
- 20th Tactical Air Support Squadron, 1 November 1975 – 30 September 1984
- 601st Tactical Air Support Squadron, 1 November 1975 – 1 May 1977, 1 June 1985 – Sembach AB
- 704th Tactical Air Support Squadron, 4 July 1976 – 1 May 1977
- 7405th Operations Squadron, 1 June 1973 – 1 July 1977

Rhein-Main Air Base, Germany

- 7420th Radar Evaluation Squadron, 1 June 1973 – 1 July 1975

Tactical Air Control System Squadrons

On 18 December 1957 HQ USAFE discontinued the Tactical Control Wing (Provisional) at Landstuhl Air Base. At the same time, USAFE elevated the 501st Tactical Control Group to a wing. As part of an overall reorganization of air defense, on 1 July 1968 USAFE discontinued the 601st Tactical Control Group and activated and organized the 601st Tactical Control Wing (TCW) at Sembach Air Base. The new wing's mission was to oversee the 407 L Tactical Air Control System and the 412 L Aircraft Control and Warning System. On 1 July 1973 all eight of the 601st TCS detachments were activated as numbered flights and squadrons.

601st Tactical Control Squadron (TCS)

From	To	Station	Call sign; remarks
1945	1946	Simmershausen	
1946	1963	Rothwesten CRP	"GUNPOST"
1963	1973	Sembach Air Base	"MAROON"
1973	1975	Wiesbaden Air Base	"HOBBY LOBBY" (1971), "BELIEVE" (1983)
1975	1977	Prüm Air Station	"MORPHA" (1983) in 1989 still in Prüm, 407 L
1977	1985	Sembach Air Base	"MAROON" (1983), 407 L
1985	1995	Zweibrücken Air Base	

Detachments of 601st TCS in 1963: Butzbach, Nürnberg, Heilbronn, Celle, Frankfurt, Würzburg, Bad Kreuznach, Augsburg.

601st TCS and its subordinate detachments 1968, 1969, 1973 - 1995:

Detachment 1968	Station	Detachment 1969	Change 1973	Station
Det 1	Butzbach FACP	Det 21	601st TCS	Prüm Air Station
Det 2	Neu-Ulm CRP	Det 22	602nd TCS	Türkheim
Det 3	Sembach FACP	Det 23	611th TCF	Alzey
Det 4	Würzburg FACP	Det 24	631st TCF	Würzburg
Det 5	Rheingrafenstein FACP	Det 25	622nd TCF	Rheingrafenstein
Det 6	Grafenwöhr FACP	Det 26	632nd TCF	Grafenwöhr
Det 7	Straubing FACP	Det 27	621st TCF	Wiesbaden Air Base
Det 8	Fischbach FACP	Det 28	603rd TCS	Mehlingen (Sembach Air Base)

601st Direct Air Support Squadron (DASS) and its Operating Locations (OL) 1968 - 1995.

(Detachment 1 was reflagged as Detachment 41 in 1969, as 601st DASC Squadron in 1973. Detachment 2 was reflagged as Detachment 42 in 1969, as 602nd DASC Squadron in 1973. In 1981 detachments were abolished, all OLs came under Tactical Air Control Party (TACP) Division.)

Detachment 1968	Operating Location 1968	Station 1968	Operating Location 1981	Station 1981	Corresponding Army unit
Det 1	OL-A	Frankfurt	601st DASC	Bonames	V Corps
Det 1	OL-C	Fulda	OL-A	Fulda	11th ACR
Det 1	OL-D	Bad Kreuznach	OL-B	Bad Kreuznach	8th ID
Det 1	OL-E	Gonsenheim	OL-C	Gonsenheim	1st Bde/8th ID
Det 1	OL-F	Baumholder	OL-D	Baumholder	2nd Bde/8th ID
Det 1	OL-G	Sandhofen	OL-E	Sandhofen	3rd Bde/8th ID
Det 1	OL-H	Frankfurt	OL-F	Frankfurt	3rd AD
Det 1	OL-J	Kirchgöns	OL-G	Butzbach	1st Bde/3rd AD
Det 1	OL-K	Gelnhausen	OL-H	Gelnhausen	3rd Bde/3rd AD
Det 1	OL-L	Friedberg	OL-J	Friedberg	2nd Bde/3rd AD
Det 1	OL-M	Koblenz			III (GE) Corps
Det 2	OL-2A	Möhringen	602nd DASC	Möhringen	VII Corps
Det 2	OL-2B	Nürnberg	OL-K	Nürnberg	2nd ACR
Det 2	OL-2G	Würzburg	OL-E	Würzburg	3rd ID
Det 2	OL-2H	Schweinfurt	OL-F	Schweinfurt	1st Bde/3rd ID
Det 2	OL-2J	Kitzingen	OL-G	Kitzingen	2nd Bde/3rd ID
Det 2	OL-2K	Aschaffenburg	OL-P	Aschaffenburg	3rd Bde/3rd ID
Det 2	OL-2L	Göppingen	OL-L	Göppingen	3rd Bde/1st ID (Fwd)
Det 2	OL-2M	Illesheim	OL-S	Illesheim	1st Bde/1st AD
Det 2	OL-2N	Erlangen	OL-T	Erlangen	2nd Bde/1st AD
Det 2	OL-2P	Bamberg	OL-U	Bamberg	3d Bde/1st AD
Det 2	OL-2Q	Neu-Ulm			Field Arty Bn/1st ID
			OL-R	Ansbach	1st AD
			OL-V	Camp Ederle (Italy)	SETAF
			OL-W	Wiesbaden	4th Bde/4th ID ("Bde FY76")
			OL-X	Garlstedt	3d Bde/2nd AD ("Bde FY75")

601st TCS Tactical Control Flights (TCF):

- 612th TCF Prüm Air Station "JEREMIAH" (1983)
- 621st TCF Lindsey Air Station (Tactical Control Intelligence Flight)

601st TCS inactivated 1995.

602nd Tactical Control Squadron (TCS)

From	To	Station	Call sign; remarks
1946	1948	Darmstadt	
1948	1957	Birkenfeld Air Station	Birkenfeld Air Traffic Control Facility
1957	1958	Giebelstadt Air Base CRP	"DORA" (1955), "MOONGLOW" (1961), "WHEATIES", 602nd TCS relieved by 619th TCF
1958	1968	Hof CRP	"LOUISIANA"
1968	1981	Türkheim CRP	"JOPLIN"
1981	1986	Dharan Air Base (Saudi Arabia)	
1981	1993	Wüschheim Air Station	GLCM site
1993	1995	Bitburg Air Base	

602nd TCS Tactical Control Flights (TCF):

- 631st TCF Würzburg, Leighton Barracks, "CHALET" (1983)
- 632nd TCF Grafenwöhr (Field Intelligence Flight), "CONSOLE" (1983)

602nd TCS inactivated 1995.

603rd Tactical Control Squadron (TCS)

From	To	Station	Call sign; remarks
1946	1948	Neustadt an der Aisch	"PLANTER"
1948	1953	Döbraberg (Hof) CRP	"PLANTER"
1953	1965	Birkenfeld	Birkenfeld Air Traffic Control Facility
1965		inactivated	
1976	1993	Mehlingen (Sembach Air Base)	"MAROON" (1983), 407 L
1993	1995	Bitburg Air Base	

603rd TCS Tactical Control Flights (TCF):

- 611th TCF Alzey, "EXPIRE" (1971), "MUTATE" (1983)
- 622nd TCF Rheingrafenstein, "LOUIS JONES" (1971), "CALORIE" (1983)

603rd TCS inactivated 1995.

604th Tactical Control Squadron (TCS)

From	To	Station	Call sign; remarks
1953	1958	Freising CRC	"RACECARD" (1955)
1958	1965	Regensburg CRP	"MERCURY"
1965		inactivated	Mission taken over by CRC Freising (GAF), "MOLETRAP", "COLDTRACK"
1965		inactivated	Mission taken over by CRP Burglengenfeld (GAF), "ANGEL FACE", "TRUMPET"

604th TCS inactivated 1995.

The "Creek" Projects 1976 - 1977

- 1976, 1 April Project “Creek North”: opening of eight new units and three new sites in Northern Germany, in 2 ATAF area: Hessisch Oldendorf, Bad Münder and Schwelentrup.

Hessisch Oldendorf was the site of a former RNAF Hawk missile battery HQ and the other two locations were its satellite missile launch sites.

- 1976, 21 May Project “Creek Control”: opening of Hessisch Oldendorf Air Station.
- 1977, 15 March Project “Creek Brahman”: activation of one squadron and two flights at Carl Schurz Kaserne in Bremerhaven with their operational sites at Basdahl and Wanna respectively.
- 1977, 1 April Project “Creek Tie”: activation of the NATO Operations Support Cell (NOSC) at Kalkar. Its mission was to perform the same scheduling of control activity for 2 ATAF units as the ATOC provided for 4 ATAF CRPs and FACPs.
- 609th TCS Bad Münder CRP (1976, 1 April)
  - 619th TCF Schwelentrup (1976, 1 April)
  - 629th TCF Schwelentrup (1976, 1 May)
- 600th TCG Hessisch Oldendorf Air Station (1976, 20 September)
- 600th CSS Hessisch Oldendorf Air Station (1976, 20 September)
- 606th TCS Basdahl (1977, 15 March)
  - 626th TCF Wanna (1977, 15 March)
  - 636th TCF Wanna (1977, 15 March)
- NATO Operations Support Cell (NOSC) Kalkar (1977, 1 April)

606th Tactical Control Squadron (TCS)

From	To	Station	Call sign; remarks
1963	1974	Döbraberg (Hof) CRC	"PATRICK", "VOLLEYBALL" (1955), "RUSTCROWD" (1983)
1964		Döbraberg (Hof) CRP	606th TCS absorbed Det 2/602nd TCS Hof
1974		inactivated	Mission taken over by CRP Burglengenfeld (GAF), "ANGEL FACE", "TRUMPET"
1985	1992	Basdahl (Bremerhaven)	"GALLEY"

606th TCS Tactical Control Flights (TCF)+

- 626th TCF Wanna (Bremerhaven) (Wanna Communications Annex, electronic warfare installation) "COMPOSE"
- 636th TCF Wanna (Bremerhaven) (Wanna Communications Annex, electronic warfare installation) "EDUCATE"

606th TCS inactivated 1995.

609th Tactical Control Squadron (TCS)

From	To	Station	Call sign; remarks
1976	1991	Bad Münder CRC	"FANBELT"

609th TCS Tactical Control Flights (TCF)

- 619th TCF Schwelentrup (Schwelentrup Communications Annex) "CITRIC"
- 629th TCF Schwelentrup (Schwelentrup Communications Annex) "BRAHMA"

609th TCS inactivated 1991.

615th Tactical Control Squadron (TCS)

From	To	Station	Call sign; remarks
1952	1952	Nellingen	114th AC&WSq/155th TCG
1952	1953	Schönfeld GCI	"BARBER"
1953	1953	Schönfeld GCI	114th AC&WSq was reflagged as 615th TCS
1953	1964	Langerkopf SOC 3	"ANDREW", "LOGROLL" (1961), "SMALL ARM"
1964	1986	Börfink SOC 3	"WATERHOLE", "HARDTIRE", "SCANDALIZE"
1966		Börfink SOC 3	412 L Aircraft control and warning system
1986			Mission taken over by SOC 3 Börfink (GAF)

615th TCS inactivated 1986.

616th Tactical Control Squadron (TCS)

From	To	Station	Call sign; remarks
1952	1952	Bitburg Air Base	123rd AC&WSq/155th TCG
1952	1953	Türkheim (Ulm) GCI	
1953		Türkheim (Ulm) GCI	123rd AC&WSq was reflagged as 616th TCS
1953	1968	Türkheim (Ulm) CRC	"JOPLIN" (1961), "BIFORM", "LOWDOWN"
1968			Mission taken over by CRC Messstetten (GAF) "SWEETAPPLE"
1968	1976	Wasserkuppe (Wildflecken) CRP	"TELEGRAM" (1961), "CEDARMINE"
1976		Wasserkuppe (Wildflecken) CRP	412 L Aircraft control and warning system
1976			Mission taken over by CRP Wasserkuppe (GAF) "ROOTER"
1985	1986	Birkenfeld	Heinrich Hertz Kaserne

616th TCS inactivated 1986.

619th Tactical Control Squadron (TCS)

From	To	Station	Call sign; remarks
1952	1954	Spangdahlem Air Base	121st TCS/155th TCG
1953		Spangdahlem Air Base	121st TCS was reflagged as 619th TCS
1954	1955	Toul-Rosières Air Base (France)	
1955	1957	Birkenfeld	619th TCS relieves 602nd TCS
1957	1976	Giebelstadt Air Base CRP	"DORA" (1955), "MOONGLOW" (1961), "WHEATIES"
1968		inactivated	Mission taken over by CRC Lauda (GAF) "BATMAN"

619th TCS inactivated 1968.

Support Squadrons

- 601st Direct Air Support Squadron (later 601st Air Support Operations Squadron), 1 July 1968 – 1 July 1973
- 601st Civil Engineering Squadron, 1 July 1968 – 1 June 1973, 1 January 1976 – 30 April 1995
- 601st Comptroller Squadron, 31 March 1992 – 30 December 1993
- 601st Consolidated Aircraft Maintenance Squadron, 1 July 1973 – 1 September 1973, 1 November 1975 – 1 May 1977, 1 June 1985 – 9 December 1986 (detached after 1 August 1986)
- 601st Supply Squadron, 1 July 1968 – 1 June 1985
- 601st Tactical Control Maintenance Squadron, 1 July 1968 – 1 July 1973
- 601st Transportation Squadron, 24 June 1974 – 1 June 1985
- 7101st Consolidated Aircraft Maintenance Squadron, 1 June 1973 – 1 July 1973
- 7122d Broadcasting Squadron, 7 Feb 1976 – 1 January 1977

Lindsey Air Station, Germany

- 7201st Comptroller Squadron, 15 November 1983 – 1 June 1985

Flights

- 611th Tactical Control Flight, 29 September 1986 – c. 16 October 1991

Alzey Air Station, Germany

- 622d Tactical Control Flight, 29 September 1986 – c. 16 October 1991

Rheingrafenstein, Germany

Medical units

- 4th Medical Service Squadron, 1 November 1973 – 30 June 1975
- 601st USAF Dispensary (later 601st Tactical Hospital), 1 July 1968 – 30 June 1971, 22 October 1979 – 29 January 1992
- USAF Clinic, Rhein-Main, 1 July 1975 – 1 April 1979

Rhein-Main Air Base, Germany

- USAF Dispensary, Sembach (later USAF Clinic, Sembach, 1 July 1971 – 1 June 1973
- USAF Hospital, Wiesbaden, 1 November 1973 – 1 January 1977

=== Aircraft ===
- Cessna O-2A Skymaster, 1972–1974
- North American OV-10 Bronco, 1973–1984
- Sikorsky CH-53, 1975–1995
- Boeing C-97 Stratofreighter, 1975
- Lockheed C-130 Hercules, 1976–1977
