= 476th Tactical Fighter Squadron =

476th Tactical Fighter Squadron (later 476th Tactical Electronic Warfare Squadron)
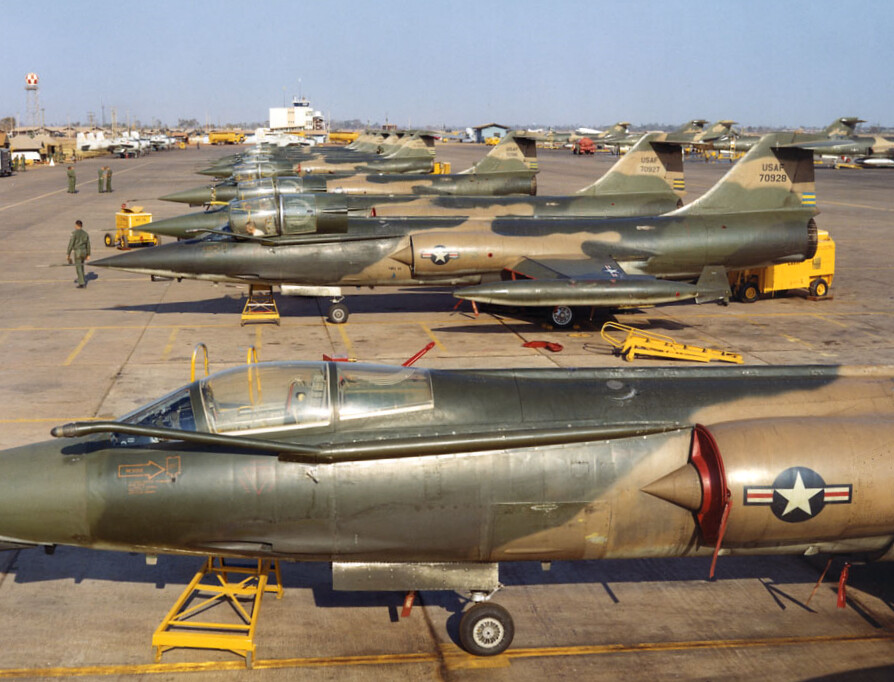
- 479th Tactical Fighter Wing F-104 Starfighters deployed to Southeast Asia
- Active: 1942–1944; 1957–1969
- Country: United States
- Branch: United States Air Force
- Role: Fighter
- Motto: Caeruli Ultra Sonitus Equites (Latin)
- Engagements: Vietnam War
- Decorations: Air Force Outstanding Unit Award

Insignia
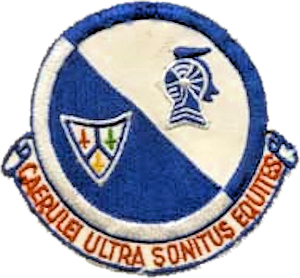
- Patch with 476th Tactical Fighter Squadron emblem

The 476th Tactical Fighter Squadron is an inactive United States Air Force unit. It flew North American F-100 Super Sabre and Lockheed F-104 Starfighter fighters at George Air Force Base, California from October 1957 until 1968, when moved to Seymour Johnson Air Force Base, where was to fly McDonnell F-4 Phantom IIs, but did not become operational before inactivating in March 1969.

It was consolidated in September 1985 with the 476th Bombardment Squadron, which served as a medium bomber training unit from 1942 to 1944, when it was disbanded in a reorganization of Army Air Forces training units, as the 476th Tactical Electronic Warfare Squadron, but the consolidated squadron has not been active.

== History ==
=== World War II bomber training ===
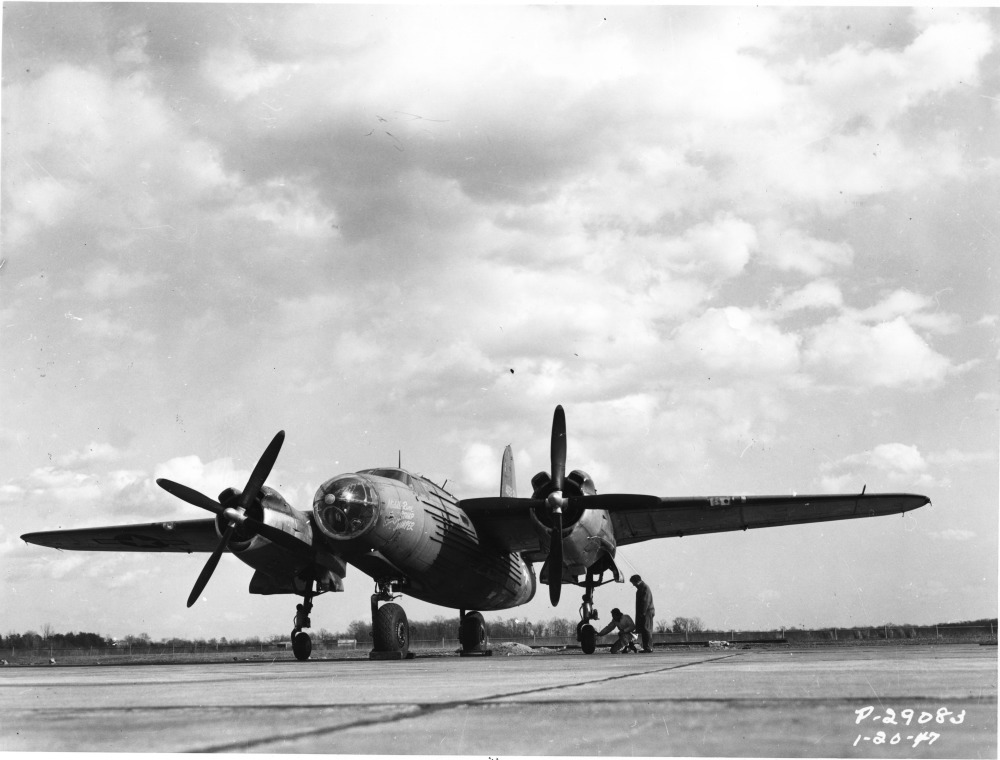
B-26 Marauder as flown by the squadron during World War II

The 476th Bombardment Squadron was activated on 17 July 1942 at Barksdale Field, Louisiana as one of the original components of the 335th Bombardment Group, and was equipped with Martin B-26 Marauders. The 476th acted as a Replacement Training Unit (RTU) for the B-26. However, the AAF found that standard military units, whose manning was based on relatively inflexible tables of organization were not well adapted to the training mission. Accordingly, in the spring of 1944, the 335th Group, its components and supporting units at Barksdale, were disbanded on 1 May and replaced by the 331st AAF Base Unit (Medium, Bombardment). The squadron was replaced by Section P of the new base unit.

=== Tactical fighter operations ===
The 476th Fighter-Day Squadron was activated in October 1957 at George Air Force Base, California and assigned to the 479th Fighter-Day Wing. It was equipped with North American F-100 Super Sabres, however it was programmed to receive the new Lockheed F-104C Starfighter tactical strike version of the Starfighter. Delays in development caused the squadron not to receive the F-104 until September 1958, when it was the first Tactical Air Command squadron to be equipped with the new aircraft. It was primarily intended for nuclear strike, but it could also carry out ground attack missions with conventional weapons.

After attaining operational readiness with the Starfighter, it deployed to Spain for air defense missions over the Strategic Air Command Boeing B-47 Stratojet Operation Reflex base at Moron Air Base. It was also used by the USAF and Lockheed for demonstrations for NATO military sales to replace Republic F-84F Thunderstreak combat aircraft. It deployed in this role to Hahn Air Base, Germany in 1962.

During the early days of Operation Rolling Thunder in 1965, North Vietnamese fighter aircraft became a problem for attacking USAF and US Navy strike aircraft. In response, the 476th Tactical Fighter Squadron of the 479th Tactical Fighter Wing from George AFB, California began regular rotations to Da Nang in April 1965. Their job was to fly MiG combat air patrol (MiGCAP) missions to protect American fighter bombers against attack by North Vietnamese fighters.

It flew these missions armed with the F-104's single M61 Vulcan 20mm cannon and four AIM-9 Sidewinder air-to-air missiles. The effect of F-104 deployment upon North Vietnamese MiG operations was immediate and dramatic. MiGs soon learned to avoid contact with USAF strikes being covered by F-104s. During the entire deployment of the 476th only two fleeting encounters between F-104Cs and enemy fighters occurred.

The squadron deployed to Taiwan in 1968 to reinforce the Republic of China Air Force (ROCAF) air defense mission. The squadron returned to the United States without aircraft in July 1968, the F-104Cs remaining in Taiwan and were sold to the ROCAF. The squadron planned to be re-equipped with McDonnell F-4C Phantom IIs as part of the phaseout of the F-104 from TAC, however the squadron was placed in nonoperational status and its personnel were transferred to the new 4535th Combat Crew Training Squadron.

The squadron moved without personnel or equipment to Seymour Johnson Air Force Base, North Carolina in late September 1968 to operate the F-4 Phantom II with the 4th Tactical Fighter Wing but did not become operational before it was inactivated in March 1969.

=== Consolidation ===
The two inactive squadrons were consolidated as the 476th Tactical Electronic Warfare Squadron on 19 September 1985.

== Lineage ==
476th Bombardment Squadron

- Constituted as the 476th Bombardment Squadron (Medium) on 9 July 1942

Activated on 17 July 1942: Disbanded on 1 May 1944
Reconstituted on 19 September 1985 and consolidated with the 474th Tactical Fighter Squadron as the 474th Tactical Electronic Warfare Squadron

476th Tactical Electronic Warfare Squadron

- Established as the 476th Fighter-Day Squadron on 26 September 1957

Activated on 8 October 1957
Redesignated 476th Tactical Fighter Squadron on 1 July 1958
Inactivated on 18 March 1969
Consolidated with the 476th Bombardment Squadron as the 476th Tactical Electronic Warfare Squadron on 19 September 1985

=== Assignments ===
- 335th Bombardment Group, 17 July 1942 – 1 May 1944
- 479th Fighter-Day Wing (later 479th Tactical Fighter Wing): 8 October 1957 – 25 September 1968 (attached to 65th Air Division 12 November 1959 – 28 March 1960, 8 April – 17 August 1961, 6 January – 1 April 1964; 50th Tactical Fighter Wing, 8 April – 10 August 1962; 2d Air Division, 7 April – 11 July 1968) (nonoperational 11 July – 25 September 1958)
- 4th Tactical Fighter Wing, 25 September 1968 – 18 March 1969 (Not operational)

=== Stations ===
- Barksdale Field, Louisiana, 17 July 1942 – 1 May 1944
- George Air Force Base, California, 8 October 1957 – 25 September 1968

Deployed to Morón Air Base, Spain, 12 November 1959 – 28 March 1960; 8 April – 17 August 1961; 6 January – 1 April 1964; Hahn Air Base, West Germany, 8 April – 10 August 1962; Ching Chuan Kang Air Base, Taiwan, 7 April – 11 July 1968

- Seymour Johnson Air Force Base, North Carolina, 25 September 1968 – 18 March 1969

=== Aircraft ===
- Martin B-26 Marauder, 1942-1944
- North American F-100 Super Sabre, 1957-1958
- Lockheed F-104C Starfighter, 1958-1968

=== Awards and campaigns ===
Award streamer	Award	Dates	Notes
	Air Force Outstanding Unit Award	28 July 1966 – 21 May 1967	476th Tactical Fighter Squadron

Campaign Streamer	Campaign	Dates	Notes
	American Theater without inscription	17 July 1942 – 1 May 1944	476th Bombardment Squadron
	Vietnam Defensive	1965–1966	476th Tactical Fighter Squadron
