= 474th Tactical Fighter Squadron =

474th Tactical Fighter Squadron (later 474th Tactical Electronic Warfare Squadron)
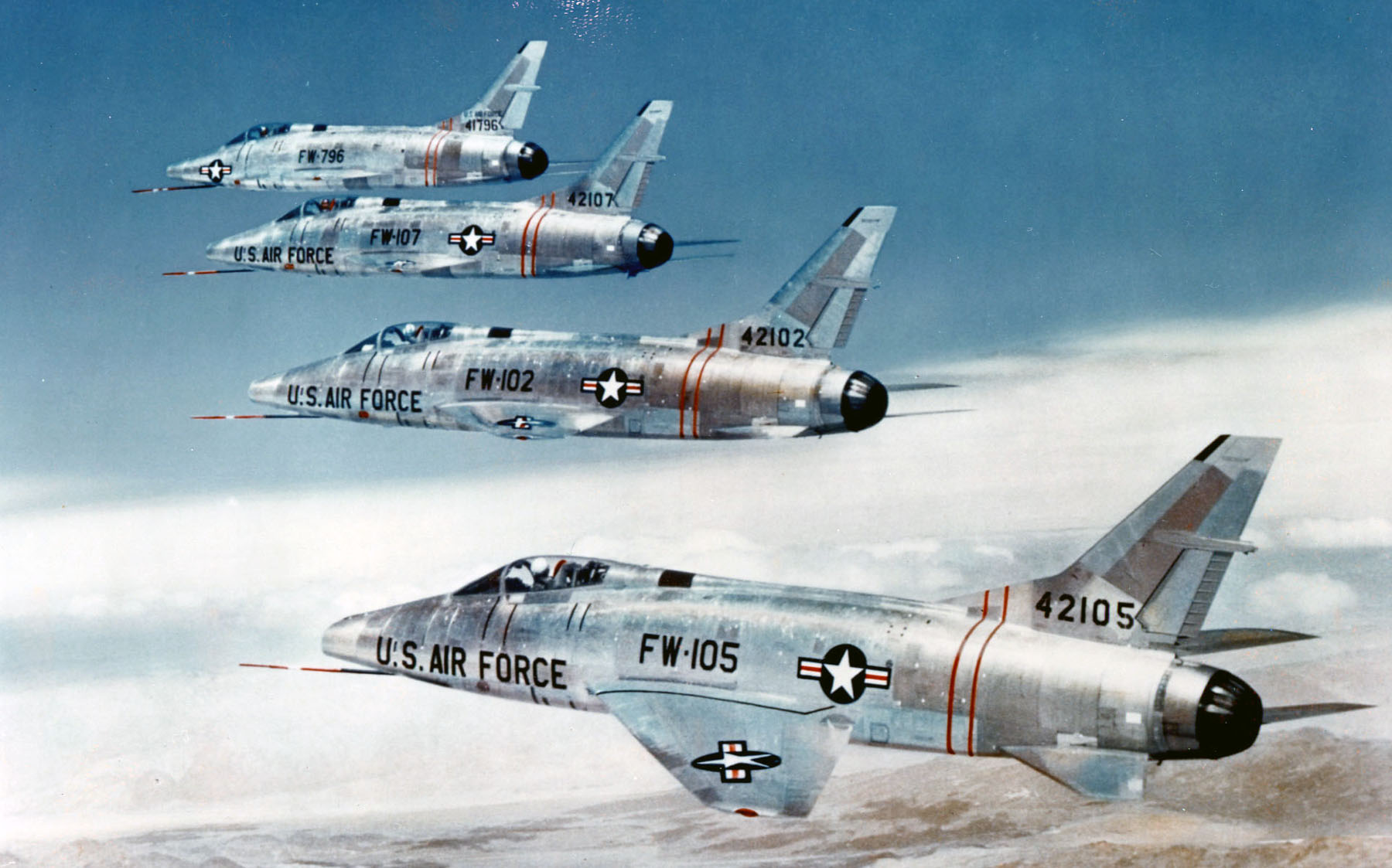
- F-100 Super Sabres as flown by the squadron
- Active: 1942–1944; 1957–1959
- Country: United States
- Branch: United States Air Force
- Role: Fighter

Insignia
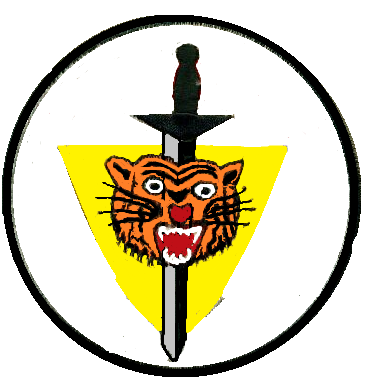
- 474th Tactical Fighter Squadron emblem

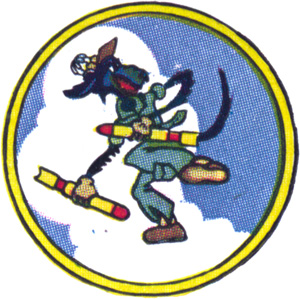
- 474 Bombardment Sq emblem (Note: Approved 4 May 1943. Description: On a light blue disc, within a border yellow, a caricatured black wolf, face and inside of ears blue, tongue red, wearing tan cap, gloves, and shoes, trimmed brown, ear phones on cap yellow, outlined black, shaded brown, and a light green fatigue uniform, grasping in each forepaw an aerial bomb yellow, nose and tail band red, figure standing on and in front of a large white cloud formation.)

The 474th Tactical Fighter Squadron is an inactive United States Air Force unit, which flew North American F-100 Super Sabre fighters at George Air Force Base, California from October 1957 until March 1959, when it was inactivated and transferred its personnel and equipment to another unit.

In 1985, the squadron was consolidated with the 474th Bombardment Squadron, which served as a Replacement Training Unit at Barksdale Field, Louisiana from 1942 until 1944, when it was disbanded in a general reorganization of Army Air Forces training and support units in the United States. The consolidated unit was designated the 474th Tactical Electronic Warfare Squadron,, but the unit has not been active since consolidation.

== History ==
=== World War II training operations ===
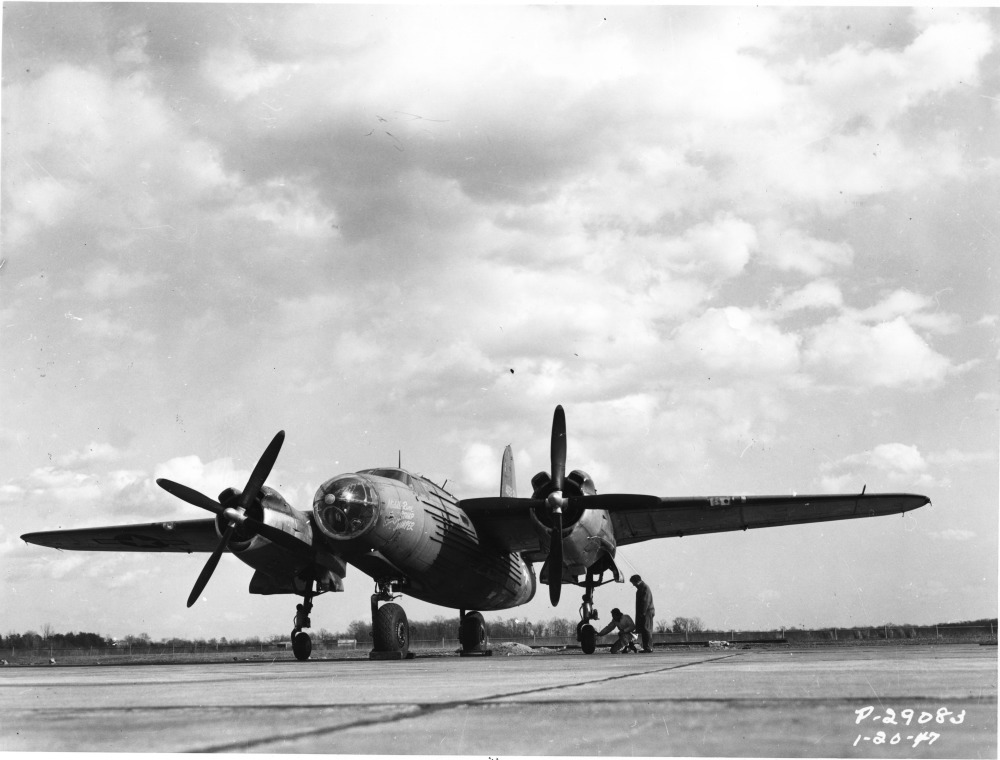
B-26 Marauder as flown by the squadron during World War II

The 474th Bombardment Squadron was activated on 17 July 1942 at Barksdale Field, Louisiana as one of the original components of the 335th Bombardment Group, and was equipped with Martin B-26 Marauders. It became part of Third Air Force, which was responsible for the majority of medium bomber training for the Army Air Forces (AAF). The squadron drew its cadre from elements of the 17th Bombardment Group, which was in the process of converting to the B-26 from the North American B-25 Mitchell.

The 474th acted as a Replacement Training Unit (RTU) for the B-26. The RTU was an oversized unit which trained individual pilots and aircrews, after which they would be assigned to operational units. However, the AAF found that standard military units, whose manning was based on relatively inflexible tables of organization were not well adapted to the training mission. Accordingly, it adopted a more functional system in which each base was organized into a separate numbered unit, manned according to the base's specific needs. As this reorganization was implemented in the spring of 1944, he 335th Group, its components and supporting units at Barksdale, were disbanded on 1 May and replaced by the 331st AAF Base Unit (Medium, Bombardment). The squadron became Section O of the new base unit.

=== Fighter operations ===
The 474th Fighter-Day Squadron was activated at George Air Force Base, California as the fourth squadron of the 413th Fighter-Day Wing in October 1957, when the 413th expanded from a group to a wing. As a North American F-100 Super Sabre day fighter squadron its mission was visual interception of enemy aircraft under the control of ground control intercept sites and providing fighter cover for friendly aircraft. When required, it located and destroyed surface targets.

On 1 July 1958, the squadron was redesignated the 474th Tactical Fighter Squadron. This reflected a change in mission to attacking and destroying enemy military forces with nuclear or conventional weapons. From November 1958 until just before inactivating, the squadron augmented Sixteenth Air Force by deploying to Torrejon Air Base, Spain.

It was inactivated and its personnel and equipment were transferred to the 309th Tactical Fighter Squadron, which moved to George from Turner Air Force Base, Georgia on 15 March 1959.

The squadrons were consolidated in inactive status as the 474th Tactical Electronic Warfare Squadron on 19 September 1985.

== Lineage ==
474th Bombardment Squadron

- Constituted as the 474th Bombardment Squadron (Medium) on 9 July 1942

Activated on 17 July 1942
Disbanded on 1 May 1944
Reconstituted on 19 September 1985 and consolidated with the 474th Tactical Fighter Squadron as the 474th Tactical Electronic Warfare Squadron

474th Tactical Electronic Warfare Squadron

- Constituted as the 474th Fighter-Day Squadron on 26 September 1957

Activated on 8 October 1957
Redesignated 474th Tactical Fighter Squadron on 1 July 1958
Inactivated on 15 March 1959
Consolidated with the 474th Bombardment Squadron as the 474th Tactical Electronic Warfare Squadron on 19 September 1985

=== Assignments ===
- 335th Bombardment Group, 17 July 1942 – 1 May 1944
- 413th Fighter-Day Wing (later 413th Tactical Fighter Wing), 8 October 1957 – 15 March 1959 (attached to 65th Air Division 11 November 1958 – 14 March 1959)

=== Stations ===
- Barksdale Field, Louisiana, 17 July 1942 – 1 May 1944
- George Air Force Base, California, 8 October 1957 – 15 March 1959 (operated from Torrejon Air Base, Spain, 15 November 1958 – 14 March 1959)

=== Aircraft ===
- Martin B-26 Marauder, 1942-1944
- North American F-100 Super Sabre, 1957-1959

=== Campaigns ===
| Service Streamer | Campaign | Dates | Notes |
|---|---|---|---|
| | American Theater without inscription | 17 July 1942 – 1 May 1944 | 474th Bombardment Squadron |

== See also ==
- List of United States Air Force fighter squadrons
- List of United States Air Force electronic warfare squadrons
- List of F-100 units of the United States Air Force
