= Europaviertel (Wiesbaden) =

Coordinates: 50°04′16″N 8°13′25″E

The Europaviertel (European quarter) in Wiesbaden is a former barracks area named Gersdorff Kaserne at the edge of the city center of the Hessian state capital, approximately 2 kilometers southwest of the Marktkirche.

== Barracks (1868–1945) ==
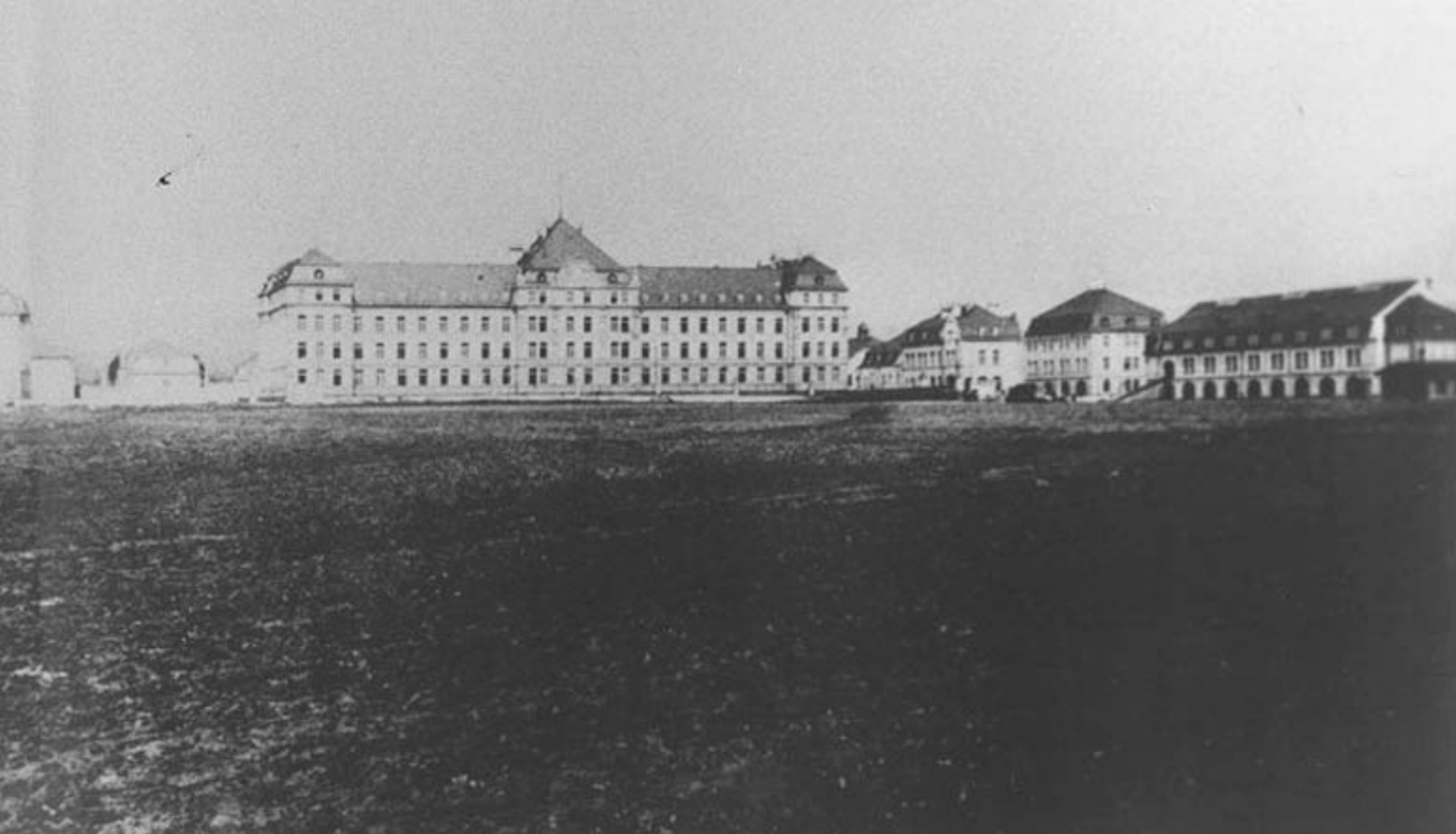
The Oranienkaserne around the last turn of the century.

Between 1868 and 1945, three different barracks, a military hospital and a laundry occupied the site of today's "European quarter".

== Lindsey Air Station (1945–1993) ==
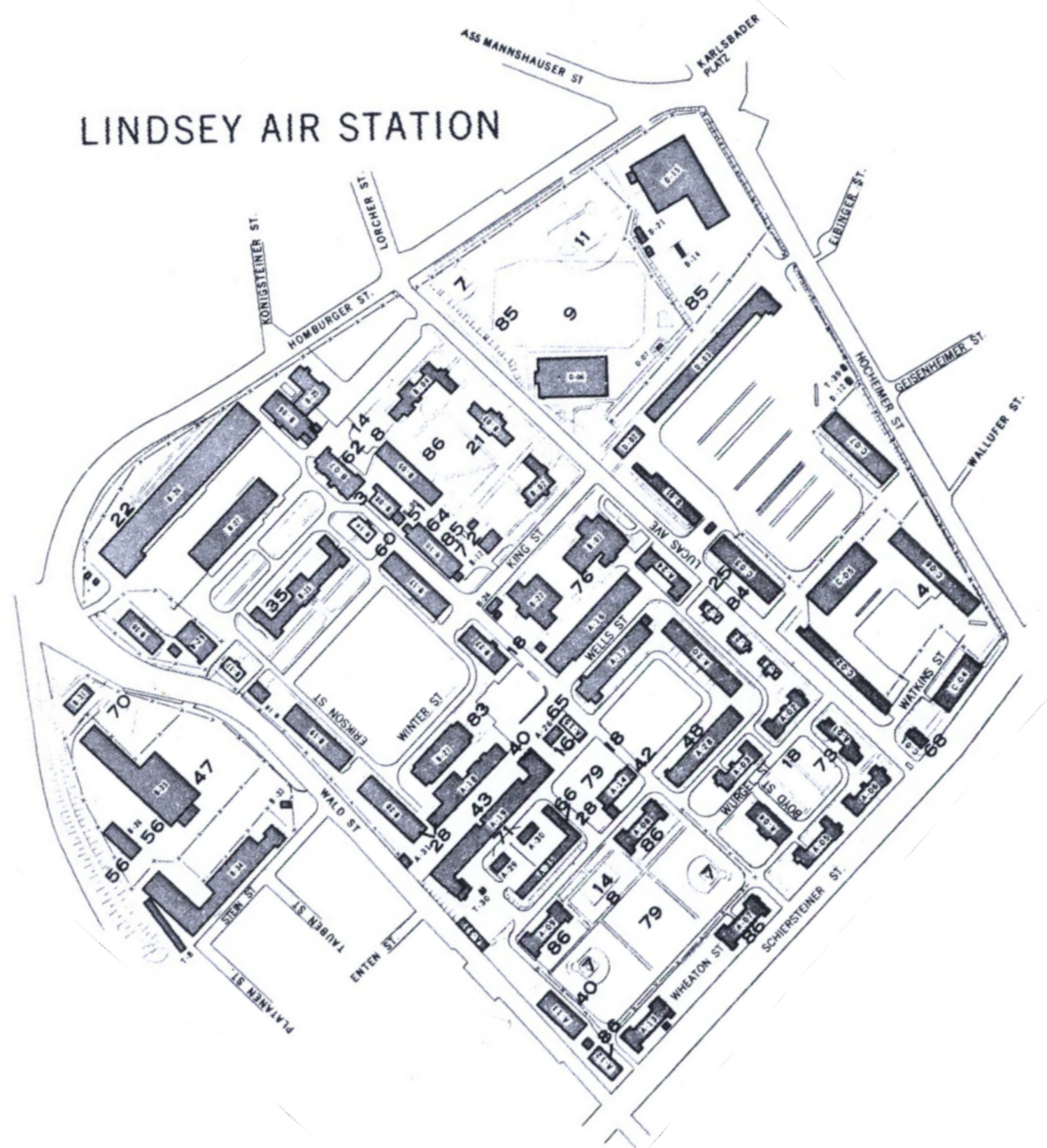
Map of Lindsey Air Station from the 1970s

After World War II, the area was occupied by the US Army and renamed Camp Lindsey (after Captain Darrell R. Lindsey). U.S. Air Forces Europe (USAFE), however, retained a small presence at Lindsey Air Station. Lindsey AS was established as a U.S. Army Air Forces installation on 13 November 1946, became a U.S. Air Force installation in 1947, and achieved its greatest prominence between December 1953 and 14 March 1973 when it was the host base for USAFE Headquarters. On that date, USAFE Headquarters moved to Ramstein Air Base.

All of the streets in "Camp Lindsey" were named for the 31 American fatalities from "Operation Vittles," the 1948-49 Berlin Airlift. From 1954 to 1973, Lindsey Air Station was, among other things, home to the 17th Air Force and the 65th Air Division.

Wiesbaden Army Airfield and Wiesbaden Army Medical Center were administered from Lindsey. After the transfer of Wiesbaden Air Base to the Army in 1976, Lindsey provided a home base for other support activities. One of these was the 7100 Consolidated Equipment Maintenance and Support (CEMS) Squadron (1990 - 1993), whose role was to consolidate all war readiness materials (WRM) management in the European theater. This group transferred its base of operation to Sembach Air Base upon the close of Lindsey. Support for various other Air Force units in the Wiesbaden area continued until it was closed in 1993. And the barracks of the 497th RTG.

United States Military Forces & Installations in Europe listed units at Lindsey as including the 7100th AB Wing, HQ, Air Force Technical Applications Center Europe, 7001st CSW, 701st ABG, 1st CCS, 1157th TCHOS, 1802nd Support Squadron, 1836th EIG, District 70 AFOSI, Det. 3 FTD, HQ ESAA, 2063rd Comm. Squadron, 1st Combat Communications Group, 7122nd Support Squadron, 7225th Support Squadron, 7260th Support Squadron, 7405th Support Squadron, 7499th Support Squadron, 621st TCF, and 7055th Ops Flight.

The 7100th Air Base Group, later the 7100th Combat Support Wing, was active at the base between 1985 and 1993, after which Lindsey Air Station was transferred back to the Army.

== Europaviertel (since 1993) ==
In 1993, Lindsey Air Station was returned to the Federal Republic of Germany and renamed Europaviertel. The buildings at Lindsey now house certain offices of the German Federal Investigation Bureau Bundeskriminalamt (red), the Hessen State Police (blue), a Folk high school (yellow), and new construction private housing (orange). The sports field and gym (green) is now the home of the Wiesbaden Phantoms.

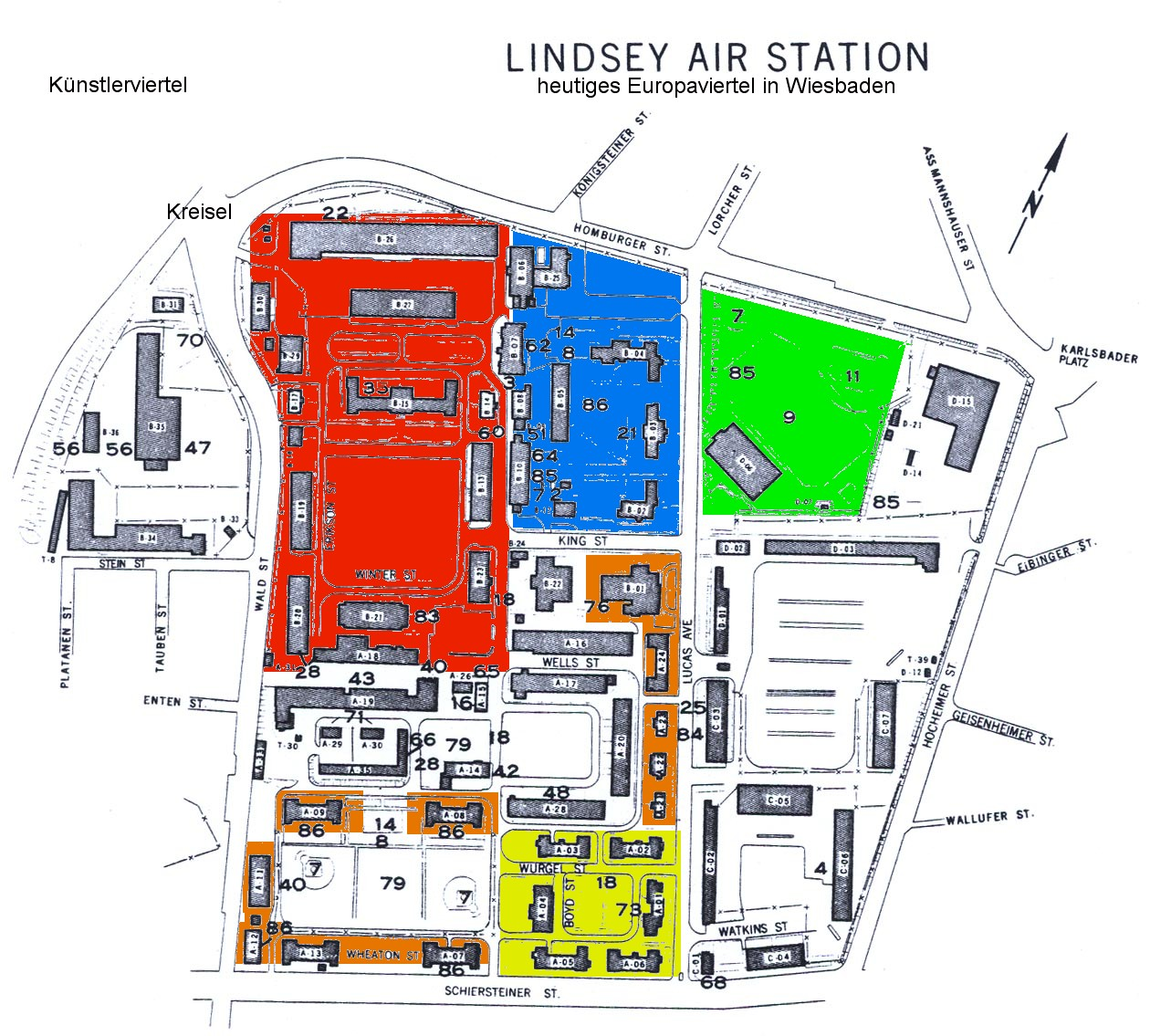
Lindsey Air Station Color
