= 65th Air Division =

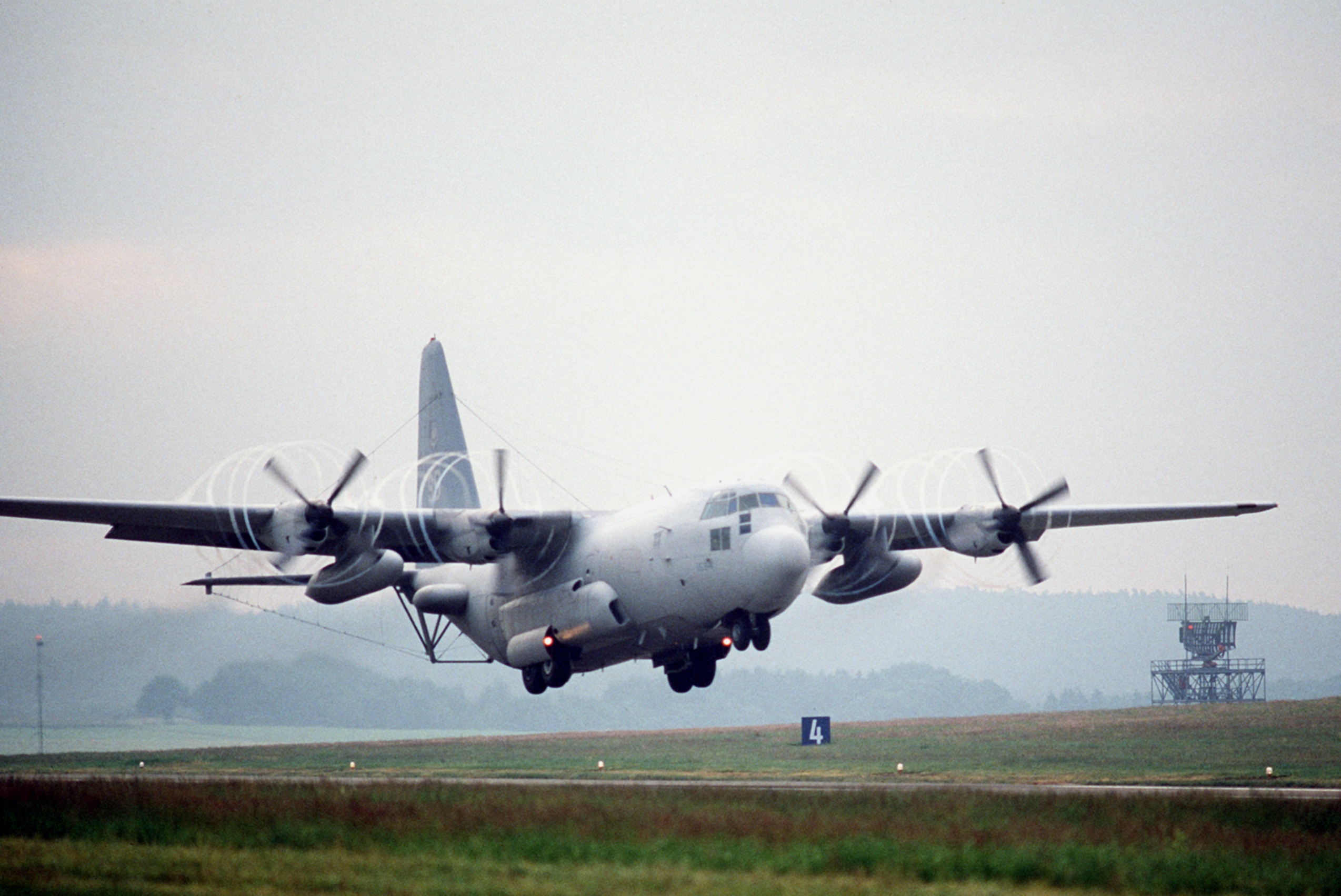
- an EC-130H of the division's 66th Electronic Combat Wing landing at Sembach AB
- Active: 1943–1945; 1952–1954; 1957–1965; 1985–1991
- Country: United States
- Branch: United States Air Force
- Role: Command of electronic warfare units
- Engagements: European Theater of World War II
- Decorations: Air Force Outstanding Unit Award

Insignia
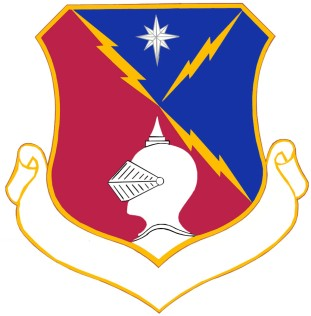
- 65th Air Division emblem (Note: Approved 1 August 1961.)

The 65th Air Division is an inactive United States Air Force organization. Its last assignment was with United States Air Forces in Europe, assigned to Seventeenth Air Force, being stationed at Lindsey Air Station, Germany. It was inactivated on 30 June 1991.

== History ==
Established as the 4th Air Defense Wing, the unit was not activated or manned. Redesignated as the 65th Fighter Wing, the wing and its subordinate units transferred to England and was assigned to VIII Fighter Command in June 1943 and began flying combat missions. "Subordinate units escorted bombers, flew counter air patrols, and dive bombing missions. They attacked airdromes, marshaling yards, missile sites, industrial areas, ordnance depots, oil refineries, trains, and highways. During Big Week [in late] February 1944, the 65th participated in the assaults against the German Air Force and the German aircraft industry. Its units supported the Allied invasion of Normandy (June 1944); the Allied ground troops during the Battle of the Bulge (December 1944 through January 1945); the Allied airborne attack on the Netherlands (Operation Market Garden, September 1944); the defense of the Remagen bridgehead against German air attacks (March 1945); and the airborne attack across the Rhine (March 1945)."

"As an Air Division, it carried out air defense operations in Iceland from 1952 to 1954. Activated three years later it transferred to Spain, where it cooperated with Spanish Air Force units in the Air Defense Direction Centers (ADDCs). The 65th Air Division directed base construction, and the establishment of off base housing and radar sites. Its fighter squadrons flew air defense interceptions over Spanish airspace."

The air division "also controlled the operations of attached tactical fighter squadrons deployed to Spain for temporary duty. Assigned or attached units of the division participated in numerous exercises with the Spanish Air Defense Command, and in some instances, with the United States Sixth Fleet. In June 1985, the 65th assumed responsibility for integrating the United States Air Forces in Europe's electronic combat systems to maximize overall warfighting potential." In this role, it supervised the 66th Electronic Combat Wing and 601st Tactical Control Wing.

The division was inactivated in June 1991 as the Air Force eliminated air divisions to shorten the chain of command.

== Lineage ==
- Established as the 4th Air Defense Wing on 25 March 1943

Activated on 27 March 1943
Redesignated 65th Fighter Wing on 24 July 1943
Inactivated on 21 November 1945

- Redesignated 65th Air Division (Defense) on 17 April 1952

Organized on 24 April 1952
Discontinued on 8 March 1954

- Activated on 8 April 1957

Discontinued and inactivated on 1 January 1965

- Redesignated 65th Air Division and activated on 1 June 1985

Inactivated on 30 June 1991

=== Assignments ===
- Fourth Air Force, 27 March 1943
- Army Service Forces, Port of Embarkation 6 May 1943
- Eighth Air Force, 2 June 1943
- VIII Fighter Command, 4 June 1943
- 2 Bombardment (later, 2 Air) Division, 15 September 1944
- 3 Air Division, 1 June – 21 November 1945
- Iceland Air Defense Force, 24 April 1952 – 8 March 1954
- Sixteenth Air Force, 8 April 1957
- United States Air Forces in Europe, 1 July 1960 – 1 January 1965
- Seventeenth Air Force, 1 June 1985 – 30 June 1991

=== Components ===
Wings

- 52d Tactical Fighter Wing: 1 June 1985 – 30 June 1991
- 66th Electronic Combat Wing: 1 June 1985 – 30 June 1991
- 601st Tactical Control Wing: 1 June 1985 – 31 July 1987

Groups

- 4th Fighter Group, c. 7 August 1943 – c. 31 May 1945
- 56th Fighter Group, c. 7 August 1943 – c. 31 May 1945
- 78th Fighter Group, c. 24 July 1943 – c. 18 August 1943
- 355th Fighter Group, c. 18 August 1943 – c. 31 May 1945
- 356th Fighter Group, c. 31 October 1943 – c. 8 August 1944
- 361st Fighter Group, c. 8 August 1944 – c. 24 December 1944; c. 10 April 1945 – c. 31 May 1945
- 479th Fighter Group, 31 May 1944 – 31 May 1945

Flight

- 1 Gunnery and Tow Flight: 17 November 1944 – 29 May 1945

Squadrons

- 1st Fighter-Day Squadron (later 1st Tactical Fighter Squadron): attached 27 June 1958 – c.12 November 1958.
- 82d Fighter-Interceptor Squadron: 1 April 1953 – 8 March 1954.
- 157th Fighter-Interceptor Squadron: 23 November 1961 – 17 July 1962.
- 307th Tactical Fighter Squadron: attached 13 March 1959 – c.31 July 1959.
- 308th Tactical Fighter Squadron: attached c. August 1959 – 16 November 1959.
- 334th Tactical Fighter Squadron: attached 1 April 1963 – 13 August 1963.
- 336th Tactical Fighter Squadron: attached 13 August 1963 – 6 January 1964.
- 430th Tactical Fighter Squadron: attached 25 September 1961 – 25 November 1961.
- 431st Fighter-Interceptor Squadron: assigned 1 September 1958 – 1 July 1960; attached 1 July 1960 – c.18 May 1964.
- 434th Tactical Fighter Squadron: attached 18 March 1960 – unknown; 14 August 1961 – 25 September 1961.
- 435th Tactical Fighter Squadron: attached 15 December 1960 – 14 April 1961; 6 August 1962 – 1 November 1962; 2 April 1964 – 18 June 1964.
- 436th Tactical Fighter Squadron: attached 1 November 1962 – 3 April 1963.
- 474th Tactical Fighter Squadron: attached 15 November 1958 – 14 March 1959.
- 476th Tactical Fighter Squadron: attached 16 November 1959 – 18 March 1960; 16 April 1961 – 11 August 1961; 6 January 1964 – 2 April 1964.
- 497th Fighter-Interceptor Squadron: 5 July 1958 – 1 July 1960; attached 1 July 1960 – 17 June 1964
- 871st Aircraft Control and Warning Squadron,

Villatobas Air Station, Spain

- 872d Aircraft Control and Warning Squadron,

Constantina Air Station, Spain

- 874th Aircraft Control and Warning Squadron,

Inoges Air Station, Spain

- 875th Aircraft Control and Warning Squadron,

Rosas Air Station, Spain

- 876th Aircraft Control and Warning Squadron,

Alcoy Air Station, Spain

- 877th Aircraft Control and Warning Squadron,

Elizondo Air Station, Spain

- 880th Aircraft Control and Warning Squadron,

Soller Air Station, Mallorca, Spain

=== Stations ===
- Hamilton Field, California, 27 March – 6 May 1943
- RAF Debden (AAF-356), England, 4 June 1943
- Saffron Walden (AAF-370), England, c. 17 June 1943
- Elveden Hall, England (AAF-116), c. 1 September 1945
- RAF Troston, England (AAF-595), c. 25 October – 21 November 1945
- Keflavik Airport, Iceland, 24 April 1952 – 8 March 1954
- Madrid, Spain, 8 April 1957
- Torrejon Air Base, Spain, 1 October 1957 – 1 January 1965
- Sembach Air Base, Germany, 1 June 1985
- Lindsey Air Station, Germany, 1 October 1987 – 30 June 1991

== See also ==
- List of United States Air Force air divisions
