= 477th Tactical Fighter Squadron =

477th Tactical Fighter Squadron (later 477th Tactical Electronic Warfare Training Squadron)
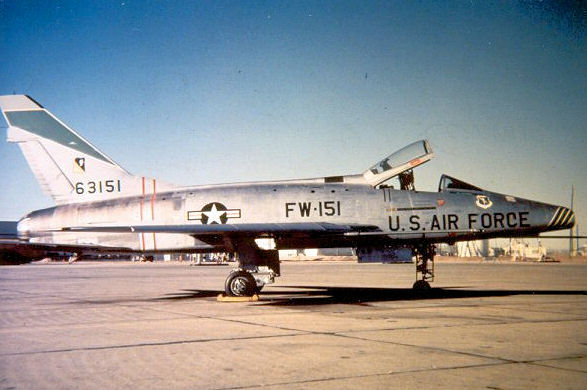
- F-100D Super Sabre as flown by the squadron (Note: Aircraft is North American F-100D-75-NA Super Sabre, serial 56-3151.)
- Active: 1942–1944; 1957–1959
- Country: United States
- Branch: United States Air Force
- Role: Fighter

Insignia
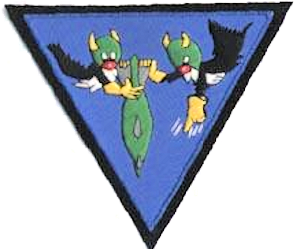
- 477th Bombardment Squadron emblem (Note: Approved 28 February 1944. Description: On a light turquoise blue triangle, point to base, two black spandules in flight, with white beards, green heads, red noses, and yellow horns, wearing yellow gloves, one holding onto and aiming a gray green bomb dart, point to base, the other steadying bomb dart with right hand and pointing toward target with left forefinger extended downward.)

The 477th Tactical Fighter Squadron is an inactive United States Air Force unit. It was assigned to the 312th Tactical Fighter Wing at Cannon Air Force Base. New Mexico, where it was inactivated on 18 February 1959, when it transferred its personnel and equipment to another squadron. It flew North American F-100 Super Sabres and deployed to support NATO forces in Germany.

It was consolidated in September 1985 with the 477th Bombardment Squadron, which served as a medium bomber training unit from 1942 to 1944, when it was disbanded in a reorganization of Army Air Forces training units, as the 477th Tactical Electronic Warfare Training Squadron, but the consolidated squadron has not been active.

== History ==
=== World War II training operations ===
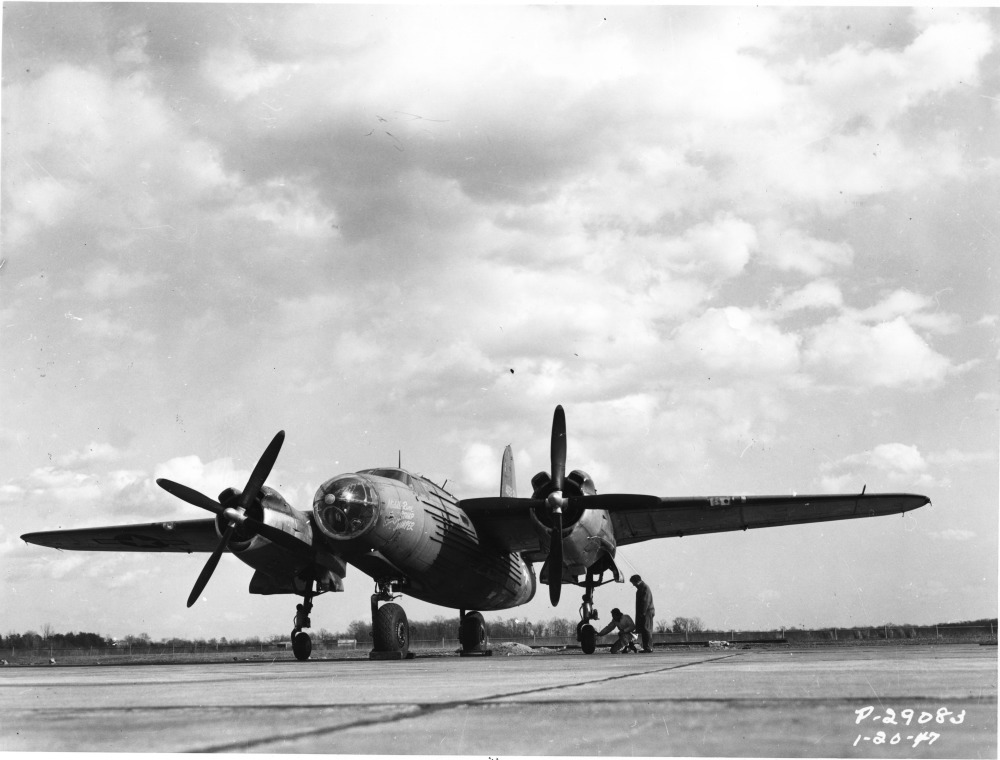
B-26 Marauder as flown by the squadron during World War II

The 477th Bombardment Squadron was activated on 17 July 1942 at Barksdale Field, Louisiana as one of the original components of the 335th Bombardment Group, and was equipped with Martin B-26 Marauders. The 476th acted as a Replacement Training Unit (RTU) for the B-26.

However, the Army Air Forces (AAF) found that standard military units, whose manning was based on relatively inflexible tables of organization were not well adapted to the training mission. Accordingly, in the spring of 1944, the 335th Group, its components and supporting units at Barksdale, were disbanded on 1 May and replaced by the 331st AAF Base Unit (Medium, Bombardment). The squadron was replaced by Section U of the new base unit.

=== Fighter operations ===
The 477th Fighter-Bomber Squadron was activated at Clovis Air Force Base, New Mexico in October 1957 as the fourth North American F-100 Super Sabre of the 312th Tactical Fighter Wing. The squadron deployed to Turkey for NATO rotational commitments. The squadron was inactivated in 1959 and transferred its personnel and equipment to the 481st Tactical Fighter Squadron when the 27th Tactical Fighter Wing moved on paper from Bergstrom Air Force Base, Texas to Cannon to replace the 312th Wing.

=== Consolidation ===
The squadrons were consolidated as the 477th Tactical Electronic Warfare Training Squadron on 19 September 1985.

== Lineage ==
477th Bombardment Squadron

- Constituted as the 477th Bombardment Squadron (Medium) on 9 July 1942

Activated on 17 July 1942
Disbanded on 1 May 1944
Reconstituted on 19 September 1985 and consolidated with the 477th Tactical Fighter Squadron as the 477th Tactical Electronic Warfare Training Squadron

477th Tactical Electronic Warfare Training Squadron

- Constituted as the 477th Fighter-Bomber Squadron on 26 September 1957

Activated on 8 October 1957
Redesignated: 477th Tactical Fighter Squadron on 1 July 1958
Inactivated on 18 February 1959
Consolidated with the 477th Bombardment Squadron as the 477th Tactical Electronic Warfare Training Squadron on 19 September 1985

=== Assignments ===
- 335th Bombardment Group, 17 July 1942 – 1 May 1944
- 312th Fighter-Bomber Wing (later 312th Tactical Fighter Wing), 8 October 1957 – 18 February 1959 (detached 8 September – 11 December 1958)

=== Stations ===
- Barksdale Field, Louisiana, 17 July 1942 – 1 May 1944
- Clovis Air Force Base (Later Cannon Air Force Base, New Mexico, 8 October 1957 – 18 February 1959

=== Aircraft ===
- Martin B-26 Marauder, 1942-1944
- North American F-100 Super Sabre, 1957–1959

=== Campaigns ===
Service Streamer	Campaign	Dates	Notes
	American Theater without inscription	17 July 1942 – 1 May 1944	477th Bombardment Squadron
