= 22nd Fighter Squadron =

US Air Force unit

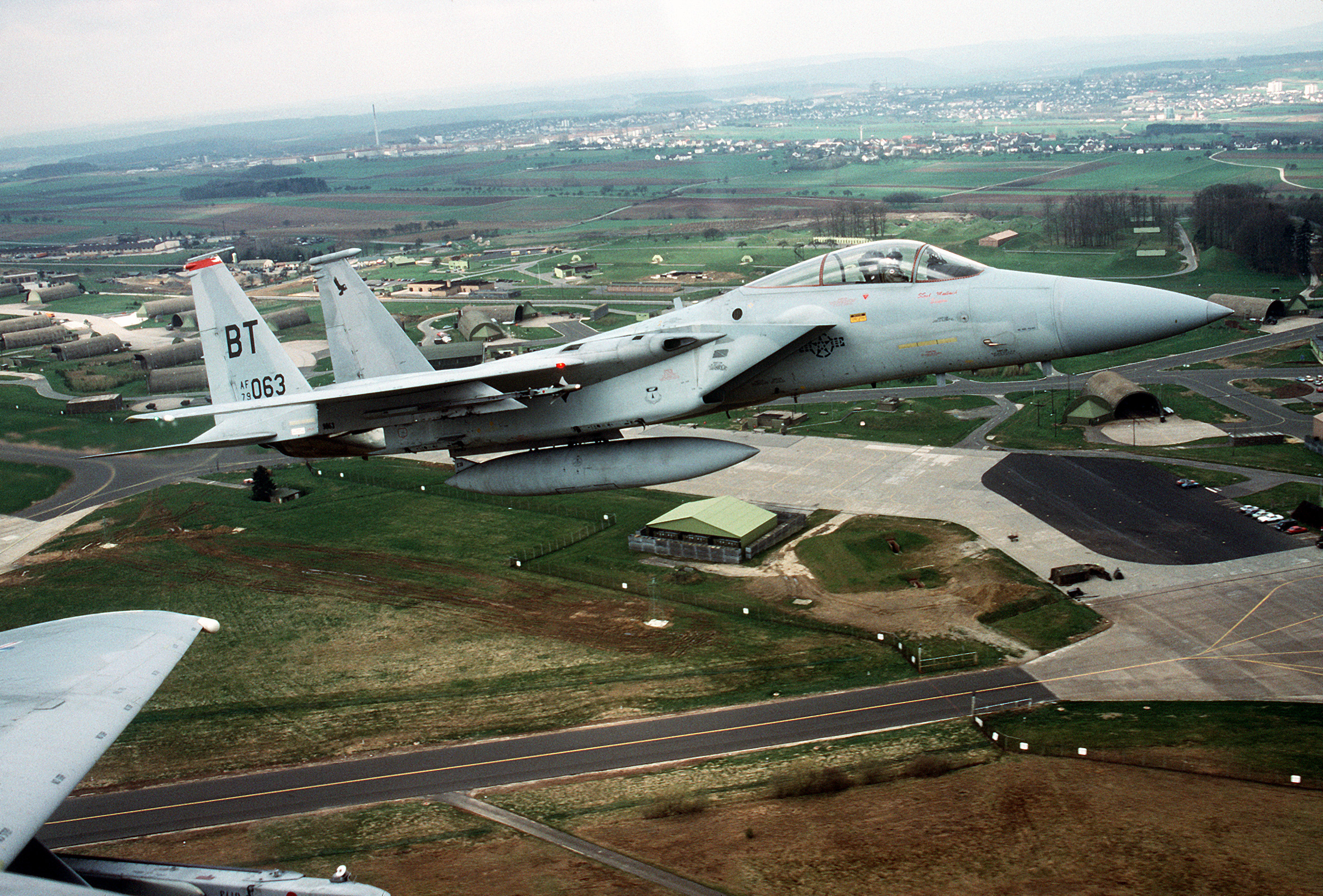
- Squadron F-15C Eagle (Note: Aircraft is McDonnell Douglas F-15C-26-MC Eagle, serial 79-0063. This plane was transferred to the Royal Saudi Air Force. Dirkx, Marco (24 April 2024). "1979 USAF Serial Numbers". Joe Baugher’s Serial Number List.)
- Active: 1940–1946; 1946–2010
- Country: United States
- Branch: United States Air Force
- Role: Fighter
- Motto: Red Hot Fighters
- Engagements: World War II; Antisubmarine, American Theater Air Offensive, Europe Battle of Normandy Northern France Campaign Rhineland Campaign Ardennes-Alsace Campaign Central Europe Campaign: Operation Desert Storm; Operation Northern Watch Operation Southern Watch; Operation Allied Force; Operation Enduring Freedom; Operation Iraqi Freedom

- Decorations: Distinguished Unit Citations (2×); Air Force Outstanding Unit Awards (16×); Belgian Fourragere

Commanders
- Notable commanders: Glenn O. Barcus; William R. Looney III "Toons"; Edwin Buzz Aldrin "Buzz"; James F. "Nails" Knight

Insignia
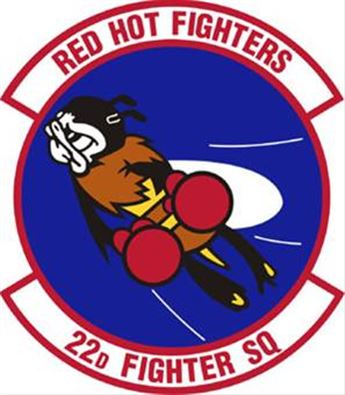
- 22nd Fighter Squadron emblem (Note: Approved 27 June 1945. Description: On a grayed medium blue disc, a caricatured, pugnacious, black, brown and yellow bumblebee with white wings, in flight toward dexter, wearing brown boxing gloves, and leaving white speed lines toward rear.)

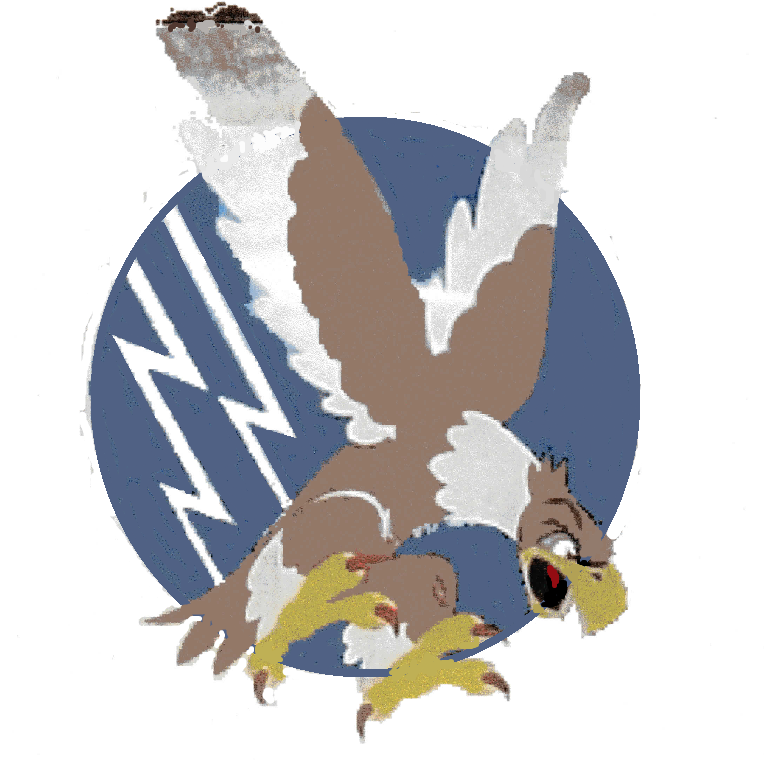
- 22nd Pursuit Squadron emblem

The 22nd Fighter Squadron, sometimes written as 22d Fighter Squadron, (22 FS) is an inactive United States Air Force unit. It was last assigned to the 52nd Operations Group and stationed at Spangdahlem Air Base, Germany.

Originally constituted as the 22nd Pursuit Squadron (Interceptor) in 1939, it first deployed to the Caribbean before deploying to England and Europe from 1944. After WWII, the unit returned to its prewar mission defending the Panama Canal, before once again deploying to Europe in 1948. It remained there until 1991, at which time some parts of the squadron redeployed to Saudi Arabia and Turkey. The squadron was inactivated in 2010 to combine with the 23rd Fighter Squadron and was redesignated the 480th Fighter Squadron. At various times during its existence, the squadron has gone by the colloquial names "Stingers", "Adlers", "Bees", "Bumblebees" and "The BIG 22: Last of the Red Hot Fighter Squadrons".

== History ==
=== World War II ===
==== Antilles Air Command ====
The 22d Pursuit Squadron (Interceptor) was constituted on 22 December 1939, and activated in February 1940 at Langley Field, Virginia. Flying the Curtiss P-36 Hawk, the squadron was one of several deployed to the Caribbean (later Antilles Air Command) and being stationed on bases established as part of the 1940 Destroyers for Bases Agreement with Great Britain. The squadron left from Norfolk, Virginia on 1 February 1940 with several others bound for Puerto Rico aboard the USAT Chateau Thierry from Norfolk for what turned into 29 months of overseas service, taking station at Ponce (later Losey Field) on 6 January 1941.

After its arrival at Ponce, the Squadron converted from the P-36A to Curtiss P-40 Warhawk. After the Pearl Harbor Attack on 7 December 1941, the Squadron was placed on 24-hour alert status and, the Squadron's P-40E's were flown to Howard Field, in the Panama Canal Zone to reinforce the defense units of the Panama Canal. The squadron returned to Ponce without aircraft, and upon their return, the squadron received some Bell P-39D Airacobras which were flown to Puerto Rico from the United States which joined the single example which had been on hand since at least June 1941. On 13 December, the unit Headquarters moved from Ponce to Vega Baja Airfield, 18°28′58″N 066°25′58″W an auxiliary aerodrome in Puerto Rico, to provide better interception coverage for the island.

Operations during most of the remainder of 1942 are vague, but involved very extensive over-water flying and many scrambles in response to reported U-boat sightings, the vast majority of which turned up negative. A detachment of three P-39Ds was operating at Beane Field, St. Lucia by 28 February 1942 while the detachment at Waller Field. The unit was redesignated as the 22d Fighter Squadron on 15 May 1942. On 2 September 1942, a detachment of the 32d Fighter Squadron which had been stationed at Curacao and Aruba was transferred outright to the 22d Fighter Squadron, but continued on at their stations on detached assignment. The detachment at Aruba was further attached to the 12th Bombardment Squadron and the detachment at Curacao was attached to the 59th Bombardment Squadron. The larger 22d Fighter Squadron detachment in Trinidad engaged in extensive antisubmarine activities.

With the Navy taking over the antisubmarine mission, the squadron was redeployed back to the United States, moving to Morrison Field, Florida by 27 May 1943.

==== Ninth Air Force ====
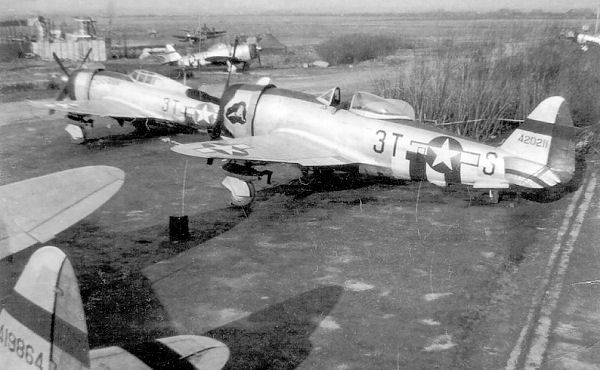
P-47 Thunderbolts of the 22d Fighter Squadron at Le Culot, Belgium, fall 1944 (Note: Aircraft are Republic P-47D-28-RE Thunderbolts, serials 44-20211 and 44-19864 are identifiable. Aircraft 864 was lost to ground fire on Christmas Eve of that year with Lt Charles J. Loring, Jr. at the controls. He became a POW. During the Korean War, Loring was posthumously awarded the Medal of Honor.)

Transferred to III Fighter Command in June 1943, began training for deployment to the European Theater of Operations as a Republic P-47 Thunderbolt fighter-bomber squadron. Deployed to England in April 1944 as part of IX Fighter Command. Initial missions included strafing and dive-bombing armored vehicles, trains, bridges, buildings, factories, troop concentrations, gun emplacements, airfields, and other targets in preparation for the invasion of Normandy. The squadron also flew some escort missions with Eighth Air Force Boeing B-17 Flying Fortress and Consolidated B-24 Liberator strategic bombers.

On D-Day the squadron patrolled the air over the landing zones and by flying close-support and interdiction missions. Moved to its Advanced Landing Ground at Brucheville Airfield, France in July, then eastward as ground forces advanced on the continent. Operations supported the breakthrough at Saint-Lô in July and the thrust of United States Third Army toward Germany in August and September as part of the 303d Fighter Wing, XIX Tactical Air Command. In October, the squadron moved into Belgium to support Ninth United States Army.

Participated in the Battle of the Bulge during December 1944 and January 1945 by flying armed reconnaissance and close-support missions. Aided First United States Army's push across the Roer River in February 1945. Supported operations at the Remagen bridgehead and during the airborne assault across the Rhine in March. Also, during 1945, the 22nd received its squadron emblem, designed by The Walt Disney Company (known as Walt Disney Productions at the time).

By V-E Day, the squadron was based at Kassel-Rothwestern Airfield, Germany, where it remained until February 1946 as part of the United States Air Forces in Europe Army of Occupation. In February, the unit was transferred, without personnel or equipment to Bolling Field, Washington, D.C where it was inactivated as a paper unit.

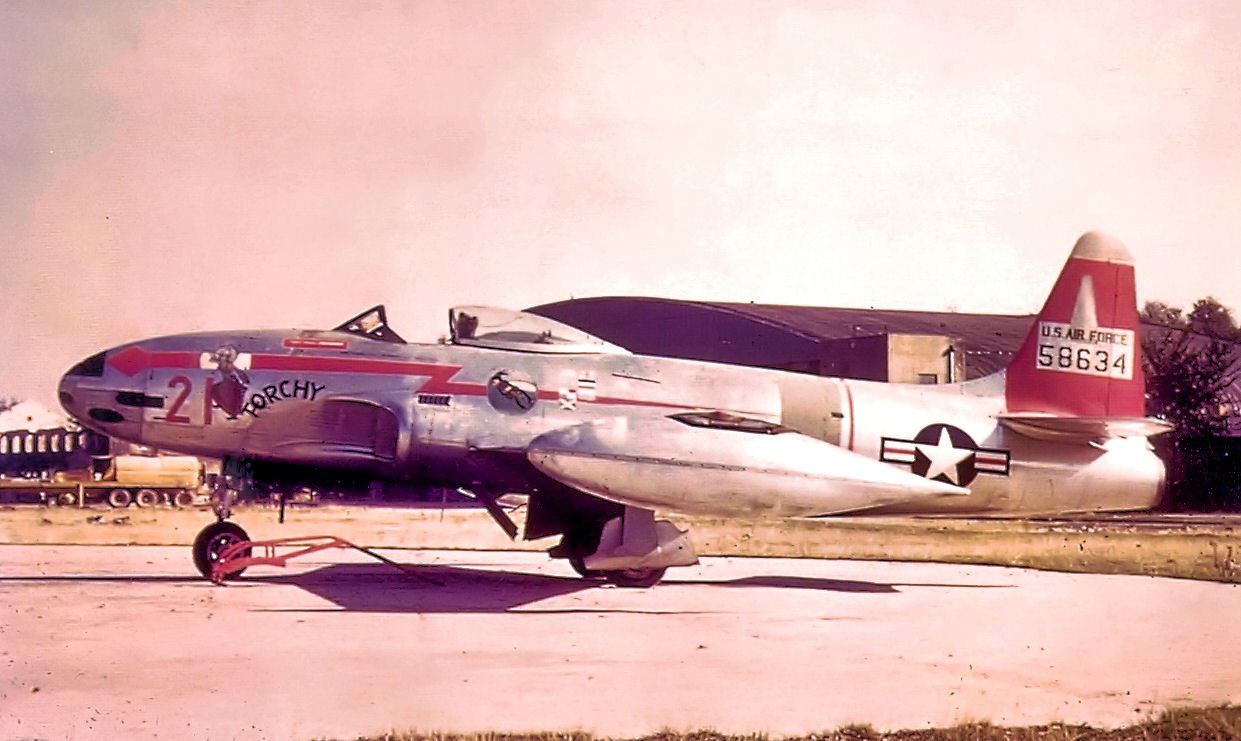
22d FS P-80B Shooting Star at Fürstenfeldbruck AB (Note: Aircraft is Lockheed P-80B-1-LO Shooting Star serial 45-8634 Taken in summer 1948. Aircraft markings appear to be those of Caribbean Air Command, no Buzz Number on fuselage.)

Reactivated in October 1946 under Caribbean Air Command in the Canal Zone, returning to its prewar mission of the defense of the Panama Canal. The squadron conducted air defense training missions for the next two years initially with P-47's. The squadron upgraded to jet aircraft in December 1947 with the arrival of the Lockheed F-80 Shooting Star.

As a result of the Berlin Blockade and other Cold War tensions in Europe, the squadron was deployed to Germany and was reassigned to United States Air Forces in Europe (USAFE) during August 1948, becoming part of the third F-80 jet group assigned to USAFE. At Fürstenfeldbruck Air Base tactical operations included air defense, tactical exercises, maneuvers, and photographic reconnaissance. Upgraded to new Republic F-84E Thunderjets in 1950. Note, blue diagonal stripes were the markings of the 36th FBG, the red nose and tip tanks being colored red were the squadron markings. The squadron remained at Fürstenfeldbruck until 1952 when it was reassigned to the new Bitburg Air Base, west of the Rhine River near the French border in the Eifel mountains, near the town of Birtburg, Germany.

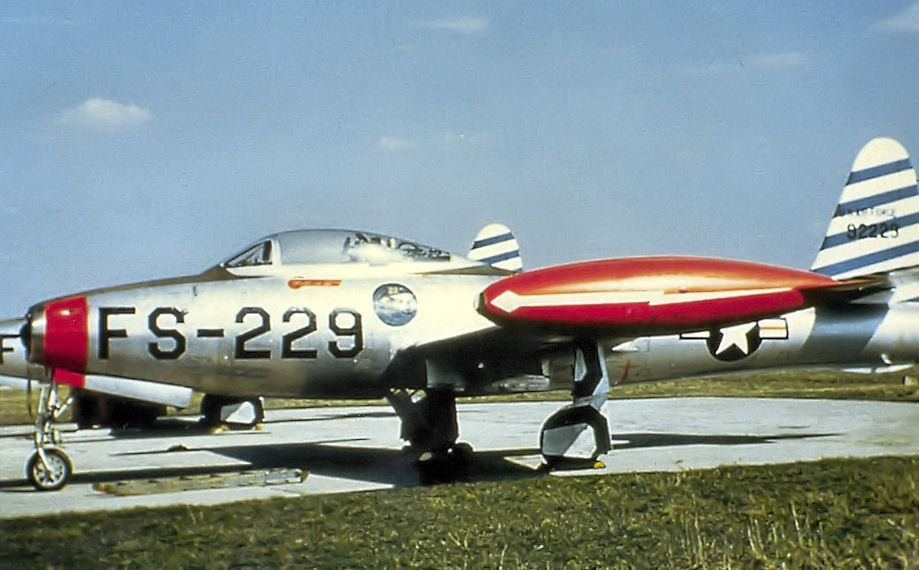
22d FBS F-84E (Note: Aircraft is Republic F-84E-10-RE Thunderjet serial 49-2223.)

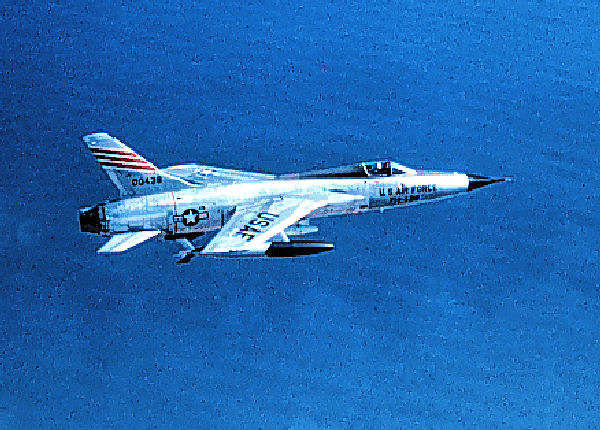
22d TFS F-105D Thunderchief (Note: Aircraft is Republic F-105D-10-RE Thunderchief serial 60-0438.)

=== Bitburg Air Base ===
In August 1953, the North American F-86F Sabre was introduced to the squadron, replacing the F-84s. In 1956, the squadron received the North American F-100 Super Sabre, marking the first time a wing in USAFE flew supersonic jets. On 15 May 1958, the squadron was re-designated as the 22nd Tactical Fighter Squadron and was part of the 36th Tactical Fighter Wing along with the 23rd Tactical Fighter Squadron (until 1972), 53rd Tactical Fighter Squadron, and 525th Tactical Fighter Squadron. Two notable 22nd pilots during this period were Buzz Aldrin and Ed White, who later became Project Gemini and Apollo Project astronauts.

In May 1961, received the Republic F-105 Thunderchief and continued to carry on its Cold War mission of tactical nuclear weapons delivery. Twice in the early 1960s when Cold War tensions were elevated due to the 1961 Berlin Wall crisis and 1962 Cuban Missile Crisis the squadron rose to a high level of alert. The squadron was upgraded to the McDonnell F-4 Phantom II in 1966.

The squadron was upgraded to the McDonnell Douglas F-15A Eagle in April 1976. In 1980 more advanced F-15Cs and F-15Ds replaced the original F-15As. Throughout the 1970s and 1980s, the squadron conducted routine training missions and contributed aircraft and pilots to the 36th Tactical Fighter Wing's Zulu Alert facility during the Cold War. When the F-15s first arrived at Bitburg AB, a German "wild park" (zoo) came to the squadron and "adopted" it. The squadron designed an alternative emblem along with full-color aircrew patches with an eagle (animal) and US Flag on it and were dubbed the "Adlers" (which is German for eagle). For a time in the late seventies and early eighties the "Adler" name and emblem were used exclusively within the "ops" portion of the squadron, while the attached maintenance unit retained the "Stingers" name and emblem. In 1982, a new squadron commander made the unpopular decision that the "Adler" patch would no longer be used, and reinstate the Walt Disney "Bumblebee" patch, which was the official patch.

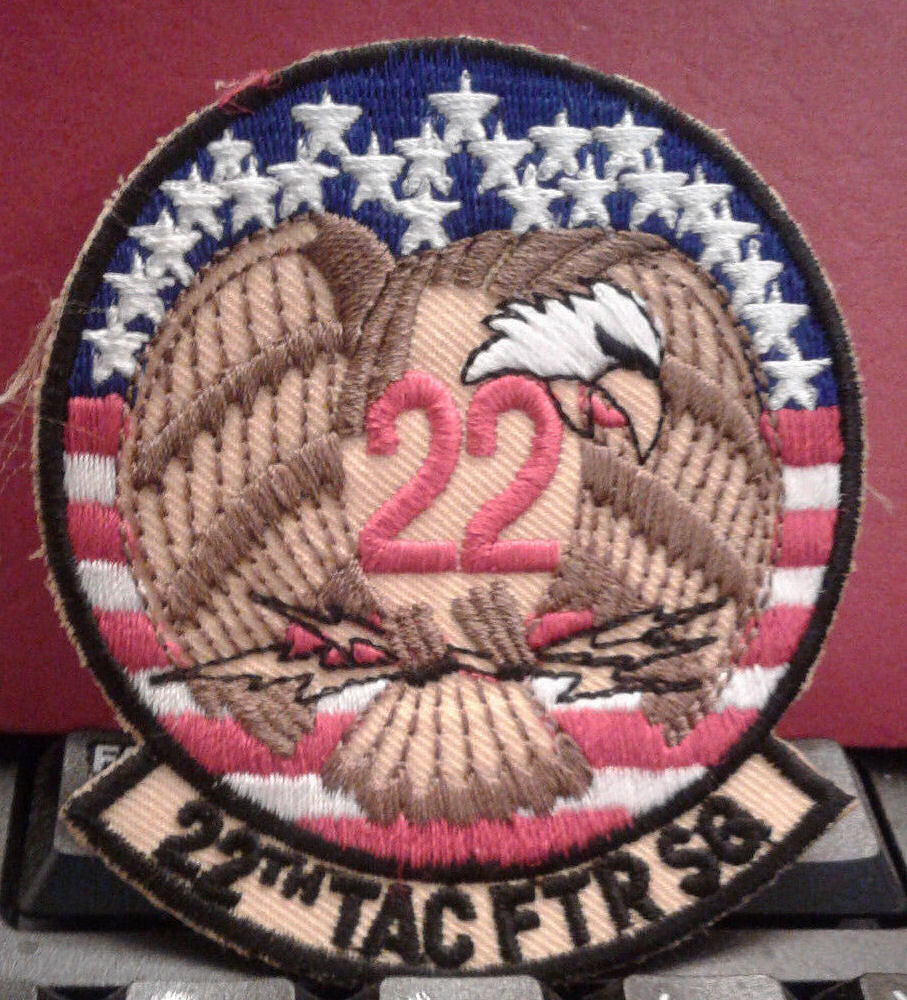
Variant "Adler" Patch worn by F-15 Pilots.

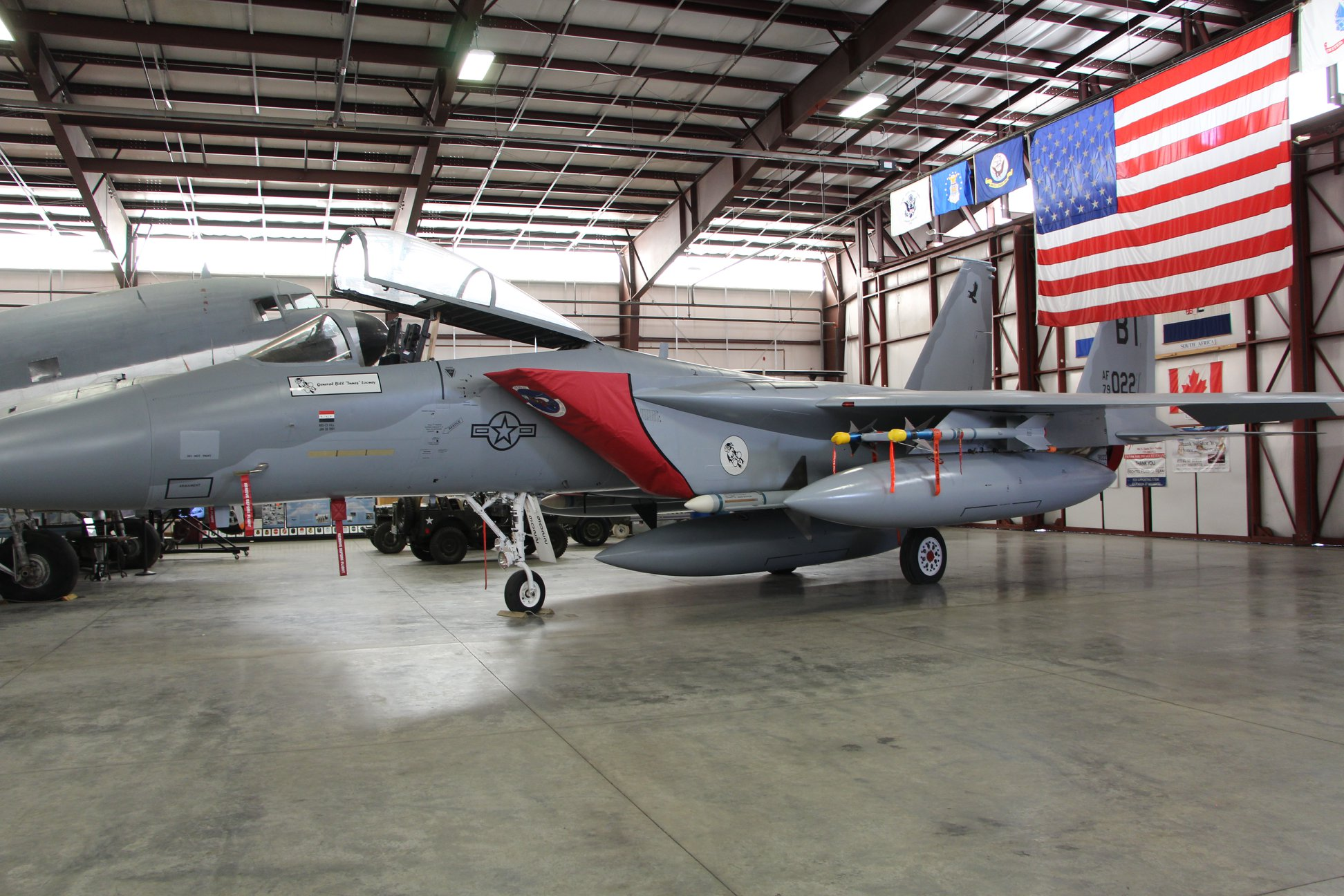
22nd Fighter Squadron F-15C 79-0022 with Mig-23 kill on display at the Pueblo Weisbrod Aircraft Museum

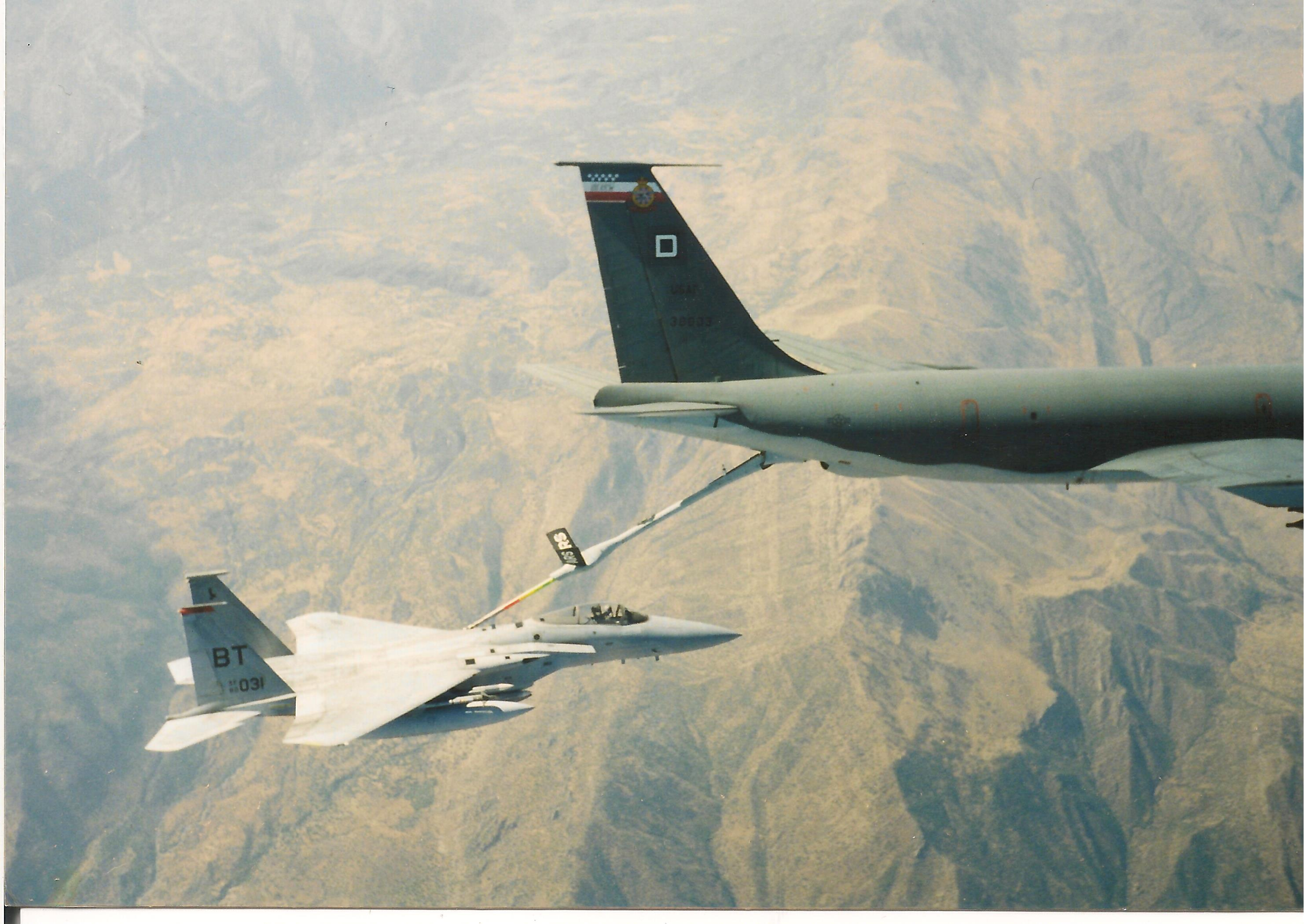
22nd Fighter Squadron F-15C 80-0031 aerial refueling while on patrol over northern Irag during Operation Provide Comfort

==== Operations Desert Shield/Desert Storm ====
After the Invasion of Kuwait by Iraq in August 1990, the squadron was put on heightened readiness status awaiting possible deployment to the Gulf Region. At the time of the invasion, the 22nd Fighter Squadron was involved in the MSIP (Multi-Stage Improvement Program) upgrade of their F-15s and could not be deployed as a coherent unit. During December 1990, those aircraft that had completed upgrades, along with pilots and maintainers from the 22nd AMU (Aircraft Maintenance Unit), augmented their sister squadron, the 53rd Tactical Fighter Squadron, for deployment to Al Kharj AB, Saudi Arabia in support of Operations Desert Shield and later Desert Storm. In January 1991, many of the remaining aircraft, pilots and maintainers from the squadron deployed to Incirlik AB, Turkey along with their other sister squadron, the 525th Tactical Fighter Squadron, and the F-15s of the 32nd Tactical Fighter Squadron from Soesterberg AB, The Netherlands. Despite their reduced numbers, the 22nd's remaining pilots and maintainers at Bitburg continued to provide aircraft for the Zulu Alert facility, as well as provided support for non-squadron F-15s en route to the war zone. In all locations, the aircraft and personnel of the 22nd Tactical Fighter Squadron performed amazing feats under demanding conditions. Not a single F-15 aircraft was lost in combat during the war and several returned with credited kills. Aircraft tail number 79-0078, one of the squadron's Al Kharj deployed aircraft, was credited with two Mig-21 kills on 6 February 1991. Aircraft tail number 79-0022, one of the squadron's aircraft deployed to Incirlik, was credited with a Mig-23 kill on 28 January 1991 and is currently on display, along with other squadron memorabilia, at the Pueblo Weisbrod Aircraft Museum in Pueblo, Colorado. In March 1991, the Incirlik-deployed squadron returned to Bitburg AB. They were followed by the last members of the Al Kharj deployment in July 1991.

==== Operation Provide Comfort ====
The end of Operation Desert Storm marked the beginning of Operation Provide Comfort and once again the 36th Tactical Fighter Wing, including the 22nd, was tasked with providing aircraft and personnel in support of Operation Provide Comfort and later Operation Provide Comfort II. This included enforcement of the northern and southern Iraqi no-fly zones and protection of Kurds in the northern region. While still deployed to Al Kharj, F-15C tail number 84-0014, an aircraft belonging to the 53rd TFS, but flown by 22nd pilot John "Nigel" Doneski, downed an Su-22 in violation of the southern no-fly zone. In 1993, long after the squadron had been re-united in the middle of 1991, the 22nd returned to Incirlick as part of its ongoing commitment to Operation Provide Comfort II.

=== Spangdahlem Air Base ===
In the spring of 1994, as a result of the military post-Cold War draw down worldwide, the decision was made to close the operations portion of Bitburg Air Base and to send the squadron's F-15C/Ds and some of its personnel to RAF Lakenheath, England. Other personnel were absorbed by the 53rd Fighter Squadron ("Tactical" had been removed in the new post-Cold War era), which was moving to Spangdahlem, or assigned to other F-15 squadrons worldwide. However, the squadron's colors were transferred to Spangdahlem Air Base, Germany, on 1 April 1994. Once at Spandahlem, the 480th Fighter Squadron's colors were retired and the 22d's were assumed. The 22d then took on the mission, personnel and aircraft of the former 480th which flew the Block 50 F-16CJ, the Air Force's latest version of the Fighting Falcon. In 1998, the 22d transitioned from a primary general-purpose air interdiction squadron to its new primary mission as a Wild Weasel unit performing suppression of enemy air defenses. The squadron's most current version of the F-16 was outfitted with the high-speed anti-radiation missiles (HARM), GPS guided-inertial aided munitions, and the HARM targeting system.

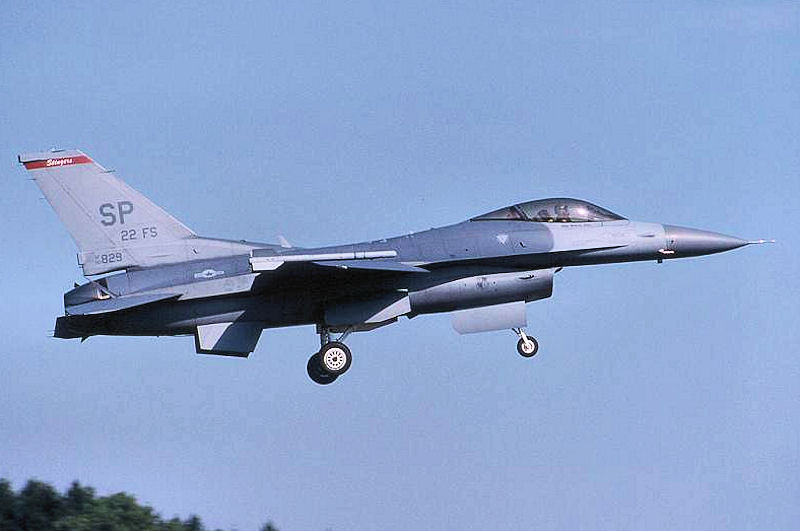
22 FS F-16CJ Block 50B Fighting Falcon - 90-0829

==== Peacekeeping operations ====
The 22d was quickly put into combat with its new capability when it deployed to Operation Northern Watch in January 1999, and engaged Iraqi radars with 12 HARMs while protecting coalition assets during heightened tensions with Iraq. After three months flying Operations Northern Watch missions, the squadron was retasked and returned to Spangdahlem Air Base where they flew combat missions into northern Yugoslavia protecting Lockheed F-117 Nighthawks and B-2 Spirits striking key military targets in and around Belgrade, Yugoslavia, in support of Operation Allied Force. The pilots of the 22d flew combat missions over Yugoslavia and fired 202 HARMs at Serbian radars. In addition, the squadron performed its secondary and tertiary missions, employing 16 Mk-84s on key military targets while providing air superiority.

In December 2000 to March 2001, the squadron was assigned to Air Expeditionary Force 9. It regularly flew combat missions in support of Operations Northern and Operation Southern Watch.

==== Operation Enduring Freedom ====
In response to U.S. presidential directives, following the 11 September attacks 22d provided fighter escort to Boeing C-17 Globemaster III over Afghanistan during humanitarian relief missions, within 100 hours of notification, as part of Operation Enduring Freedom. This effort served as the template for USAFE's Euro Lightning operations concept.

==== Operation Iraqi Freedom ====
In January 2003, the squadron forward deployed as the 22d Expeditionary Fighter Squadron to Southwest Asia in support of U.S. Central Command and flew combat missions during Operation Iraqi Freedom. The squadron played a key role during the 27-day air war by fulfilling its "Wild Weasel" mission of suppressing enemy air defenses and destroying Iraqi radar sites.

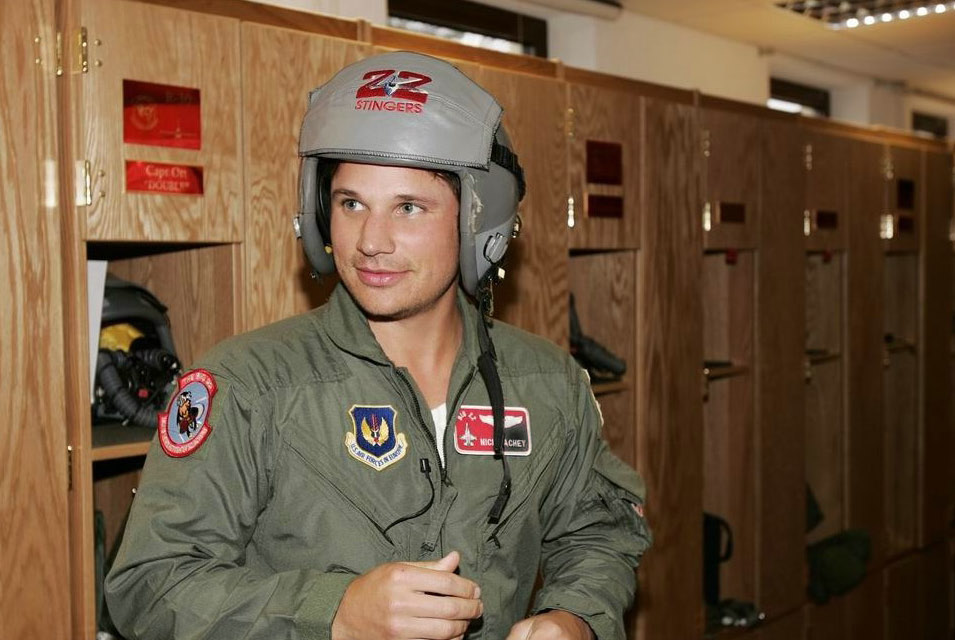
Actor Nick Lachey in squadron gear in 2008

In April 2010 20 F-16Cs were flown from Spangdahlem to the 148th Fighter Wing of the Minnesota Air National Guard, one F-16 was transferred to Edwards Air Force Base, California. All aircraft were from the 22d Fighter Squadron. As a result of the drawdown of F-16s, the 22d and 23rd Fighter Squadrons were inactivated on 13 August 2010 and formed a single "new" squadron, the 480th Fighter Squadron.

=== Lineage ===
- Constituted as the 22nd Pursuit Squadron (Interceptor) on 22 December 1939

Activated on 1 February 1940
Redesignated 22nd Fighter Squadron on 15 May 1942
Redesignated 22nd Fighter Squadron, Single Engine on 20 August 1943
Inactivated on 31 March 1946

- Activated on 15 October 1946

Redesignated 22nd Fighter Squadron, Jet Propelled on 27 October 1947
Redesignated 22nd Fighter Squadron, Jet on 17 June 1948
Redesignated 22nd Fighter-Bomber Squadron on 20 January 1950
Redesignated 22nd Fighter-Day Squadron on 9 August 1954
Redesignated 22nd Tactical Fighter Squadron on 8 July 1958
Redesignated 22nd Fighter Squadron on 1 October 1991
Inactivated on 13 August 2010

=== Assignments ===
- 36th Pursuit Group (later 36th Fighter Group), 1 February 1940 – 31 March 1946
- 36th Fighter Group (later 36th Fighter-Bomber Group 36th Fighter-Day Group), 15 October 1946 (attached to 36th Fighter-Day Wing after 1 October 1956)
- 36th Fighter-Day Wing (later 36th Tactical Fighter Wing, 36th Fighter Wing), 8 December 1957
- 36th Operations Group, 31 March 1992
- 52d Operations Group, 1 April 1994 – 13 August 2010

=== Stations ===
- Langley Field, Virginia, 1 February 1940
- Losey Field, Puerto Rico, 6 January 1941
- Vega Baja Airfield, Puerto Rico, 13 December 1941 (detachment operated from Waller Field, Trinidad after 6 December 1941)
- Waller Field, Trinidad, Oct 1942

Detachment operated from: Dakota Field, Aruba, 2 September 1942-Apr 1943
Detachment operated from: Hato Field, Curacao, 2 September 1942-Apr 1943
Detachment operated from: Zandery Field, Dutch Guyana, 16 September 1942 – 16 February 1943

- Morrison Field, Florida, 27 May 1943
- Mitchel Field, New York, 4 June 1943
- Charleston Army Air Field, South Carolina, 21 June 1943
- Alamogordo Army Air Field, New Mexico, 17 September 1943
- Scribner Army Air Field, Nebraska, 26 November 1943-Mar 1944
- RAF Kingsnorth (AAF-418), England, 5 April 1944
- Brucheville Airfield (A-16), France, 3 August 1944
- Le Mans Airfield (A-35), France, c. 5 September 1944
- Athis Airfield (A-76), France, 23 September 1944
- Juvincourt Airfield (A-68), France, 5 October 1944
- Le Culot Airfield (A-89), Belgium, c. 27 October 1944
- Aachen Airfield (Y-46), Germany, 28 March 1945
- Niedermendig Airfield (Y-62), Germany, 8 April 1945
- Kassel-Rothwestern Airfield (R-12), Germany, 21 April 1945 – 15 February 1946
- Bolling Field, District of Columbia, 15 February – 31 March 1946
- Howard Field (later Howard Air Force Base), Panama Canal Zone, 15 October 1946-c. 25 July 1948
- Furstenfeldbruck Air Base, Germany, 13 August 1948
- Bitburg Air Base, Germany, 28 October 1952
- Spangdahlem Air Base, Germany, 1 April 1994 – 13 August 2010

=== Aircraft ===
- Curtiss XP-37 (1940)
- Curtiss P-36 Hawk (1940–1942)
- Curtiss P-40 Warhawk (1941, 1942–1943)
- Bell P-39 Airacobra (1941–1943)
- Republic P-47 Thunderbolt (1943–1945, 1946–1947)
- Lockheed F-80 Shooting Star (1947–1950)
- Republic F-84 Thunderjet (1950–1953)
- North American F-86 Sabre (1953–1956)
- North American F-100 Super Sabre (1956–1961)
- Republic F-105 Thunderchief (1961–1966)
- McDonnell F-4 Phantom II (1966–1977)
- McDonnell Douglas F-15 Eagle (1977–1994)
- General Dynamics F-16 Fighting Falcon (1994–2010)
