= 23rd Fighter Squadron =

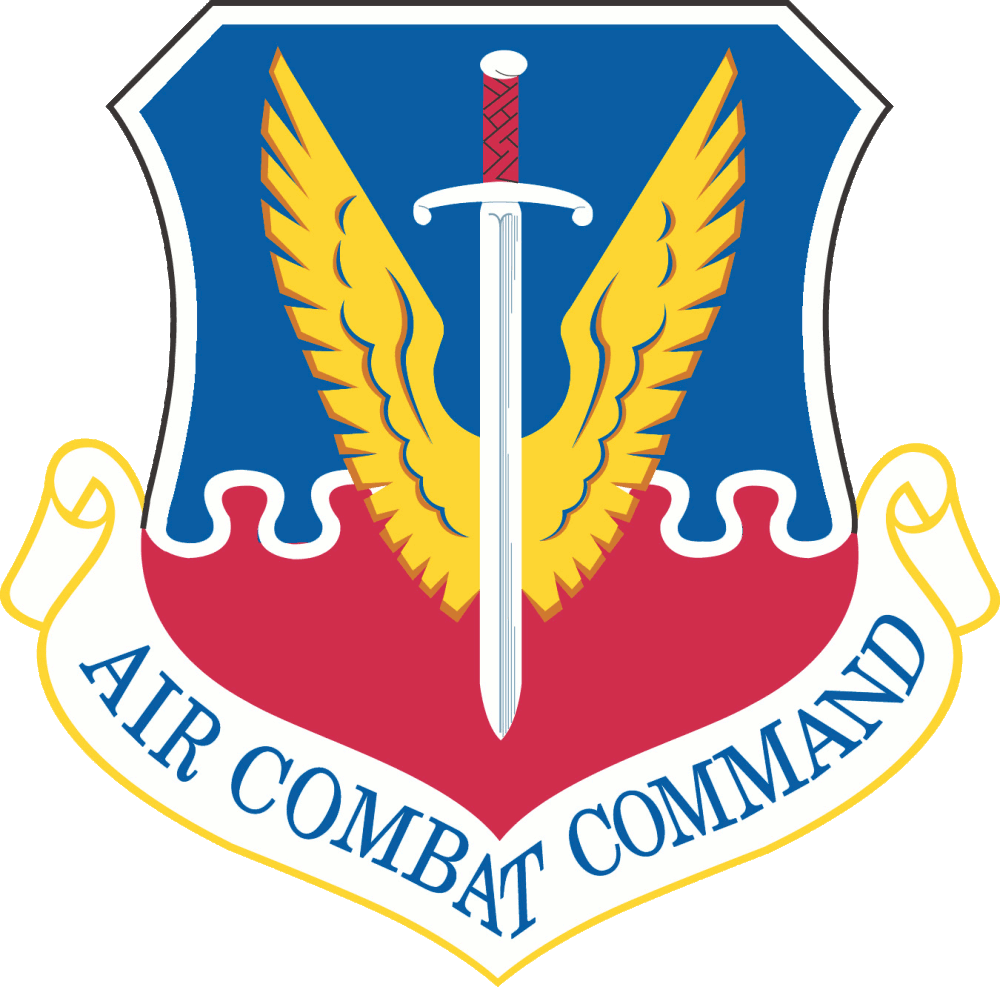
23d Fighter Squadron Later 23rd Electronic Warfare Squadron

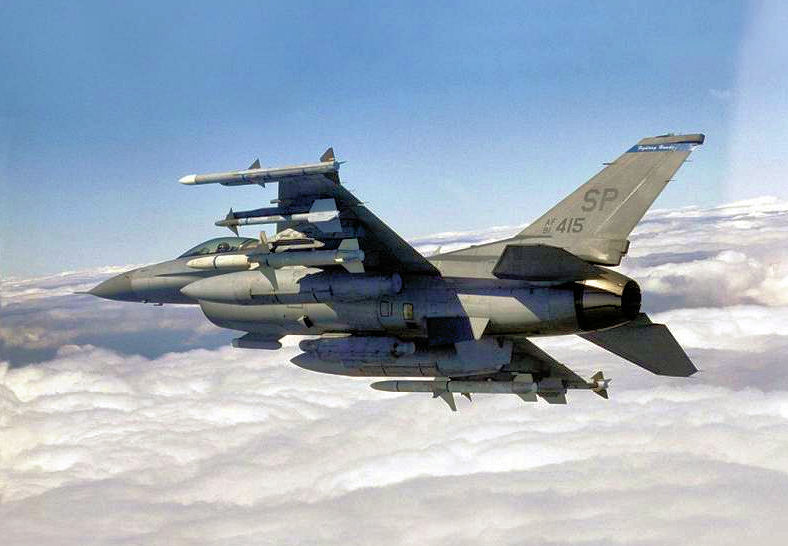
- Squadron F-16 Fighting Falcon (Note: Aircraft is General Dynamics F-16C Block 50D Fighting Falcon serial 91-415.)
- Active: 1940–1946; 1946–2010; 2025–present
- Country: United States
- Branch: United States Air Force
- Role: Electronic warfare
- Part of: Air Combat Command
- Garrison/HQ: Eglin Air Force Base, Florida
- Engagements: Operation Overlord; Battle of the Bulge; Gulf War; Operation Deny Flight; Operation Southern Watch; Operation Deliberate Force; Operation Allied Force; Iraq War
- Decorations: Distinguished Unit Citation; Air Force Outstanding Unit Award with Combat "V" Device; Air Force Outstanding Unit Award; Belgian Fourragère

Insignia
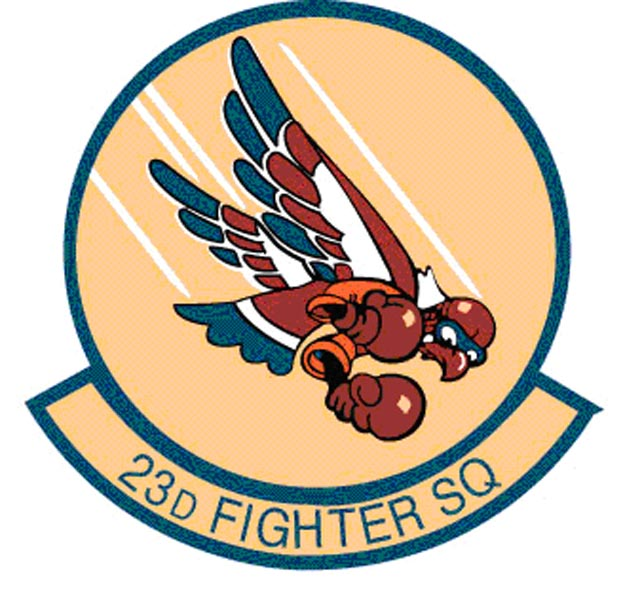
- 23d Electronic Warfare Squadron emblem (Note: Approved 23 September 1943. Description: On a grayed yellow orange disc, a caricatured red, white and blue hawk, wearing a tan jacket and aviator's helmet, blue goggles, and brown boxing gloves, diving toward sinister base, and emitting white speed lines to the rear. Designed by Walt Disney Procuctions.)

The 23rd Electronic Warfare Squadron is an active United States Air Force unit. It is assigned to the 350th Spectrum Warfare Group and stationed at Eglin Air Force Base, Florida. It was most recently activated on 18 April 2025. The 23rd had previously been the 23rd Fighter Squadron, operating the General Dynamics F-16CJ/DJ Fighting Falcon from Spangdahlem Air Base, Germany, until its inactivation on 13 August 2010.

== History ==
=== World War II ===
The 23rd Electronic Warfare Squadron, the "Fighting Hawks," was constituted on 22 December 1939, at Langley Field, Virginia, as the 23d Pursuit Squadron (Interceptor) flying Curtiss P-36 Hawk aircraft. The unit moved to Kelly Field, Texas, in January 1940, and was equipped with the Curtiss YP-37.

==== Antisubmarine warfare ====
The squadron was one of several deployed to the Caribbean and stationed on bases established as part of the 1940 Destroyers for Bases Agreement with Great Britain. The squadron left from Norfolk, Virginia on 1 February 1940 with several others bound for Puerto Rico aboard the USAT Chateau Thierry for what turned into 29 months of overseas service, taking station at Ponce (later Losey Field) on 6 January 1941. A detachment of the squadron was also established at Benedict Field, St. Croix, US Virgin Islands. In both locations, the mission of the squadron was air defense.

After the Pearl Harbor Attack, the 23rd engaged in anti-submarine warfare against German U-boats. The unit's Bell P-39 Airacobras and Curtiss P-40 Warhawks were loaded with 300-pound general-purpose bombs and searched for submarines. While several subs were confirmed as "sighted", no claims were made. On 28 January 1942 the squadron moved to an auxiliary aerodrome, Vega Baja Field, Puerto Rico 18°28′58″N 066°25′58″W to provide better interception coverage for the island. Like other squadrons attached to the Antilles Air Command, the unit was alerted on at least two occasions for a possible attack on Vichy French Martinique.

The squadron was renamed the 23rd Fighter Squadron in 1942. When the Navy took over the anti-submarine mission, the squadron was redeployed back to the United States, moving to Morrison Field, Florida by 27 May, and it converted to the Republic P-47 Thunderbolt in June 1943.

==== European Theater of Operations ====
In March 1944, the 23d deployed to RAF Kingsnorth, England, and Ninth Air Force's 36th Fighter Group. The squadron earned the Distinguished Unit Citation in September 1944 for missions flown from England and forward bases in France supporting the D-Day invasion and the Battle of the Bulge.

Between October 1944 and January 1945, while operating from airfields in Belgium, the squadron earned two citations in the Belgian Army Order of the Day as well as the Belgium Fourragère. The unit was awarded a second Distinguished Unit Citation for action in Germany during April 1945.

==== United States Air Forces in Europe ====
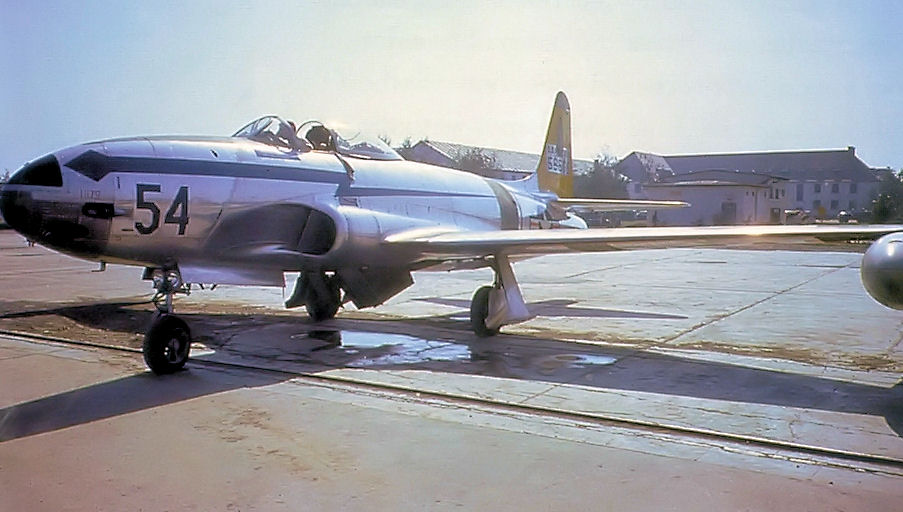
23d Fighter Squadron F-80 (Note: Aircraft is Lockheed P-80B-1-LO Shooting Star, serial 45-8554 at Furstenfeldbruck AB, Germany, Summer 1948. Aircraft markings appear to be those of Caribbean Air Command, with no "Buzz Number" on the fuselage nose.)

After being inactivated in March 1946, the squadron was reactivated in October 1946 at Howard Field, Panama Canal Zone, flying the P-47 and the Lockheed P-80 Shooting Star. In July 1948, the squadron returned to Germany at Fürstenfeldbruck Air Base. There, the 23rd helped form the Skyblazers, an aerial demonstration team and forerunner to today's Thunderbirds.

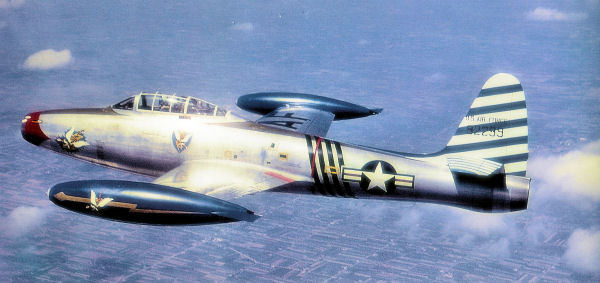
23d Fighter-Bomber Squadron F-84E (Note: Aircraft is Republic F-84E-10-RE Thunderjet, serial 49-2299 in 1951, flown by the Wing Commander Col. Robert L. Scott. Note the 23d Fighter Group emblem on the nose, as Col. Scott was a "Flying Tiger" in China during World War II.)

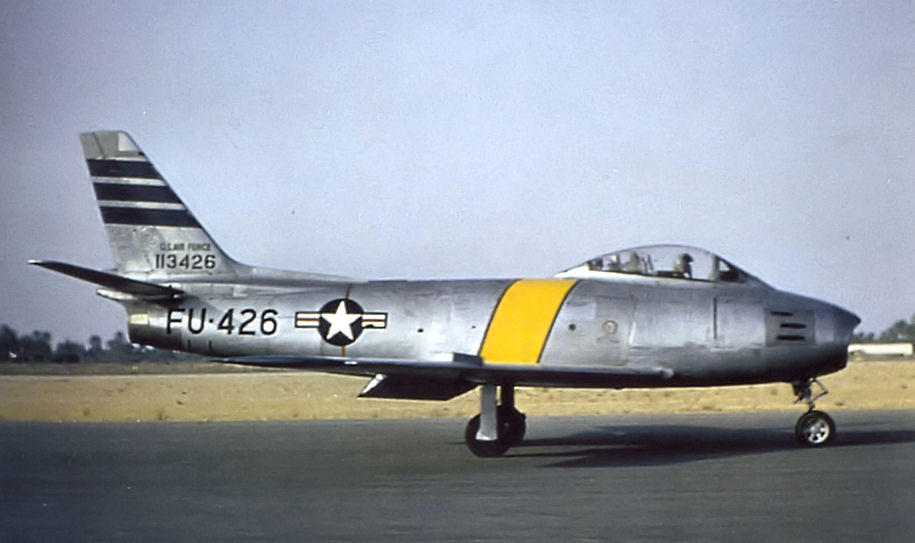
23d Fighter Day Squadron F-86 Sabre (Note: Aircraft is North American F-86F-25-NH Sabre serial 51-13426,)

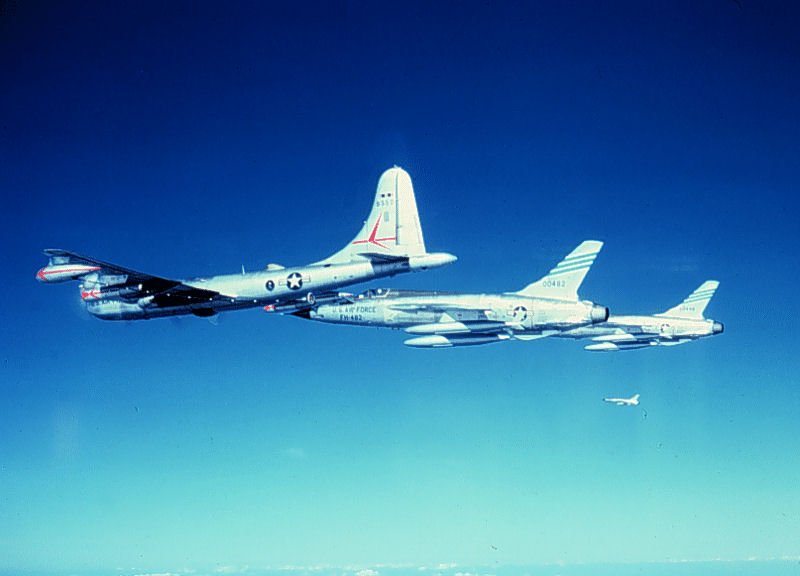
KB-50J of the 420th Air Refueling Squadron refueling 2 Republic F-105D's from the 23d Tactical Fighter Squadron, about 1960

In November 1952, the squadron moved to Bitburg Air Base, Germany, as part of the 36th Tactical Fighter Wing. In September 1954, the squadron converted to the Republic F-84 Thunderjet and was redesignated the 23d Fighter-Day Squadron. It was the first squadron in Europe to fly the North American F-86 Sabre (1956), the North American F-100 Super Sabre (1956), the Republic F-105 Thunderchief (1961), and the McDonnell F-4 Phantom II (1966). During this period, the squadron received two Air Force Outstanding Unit Awards.

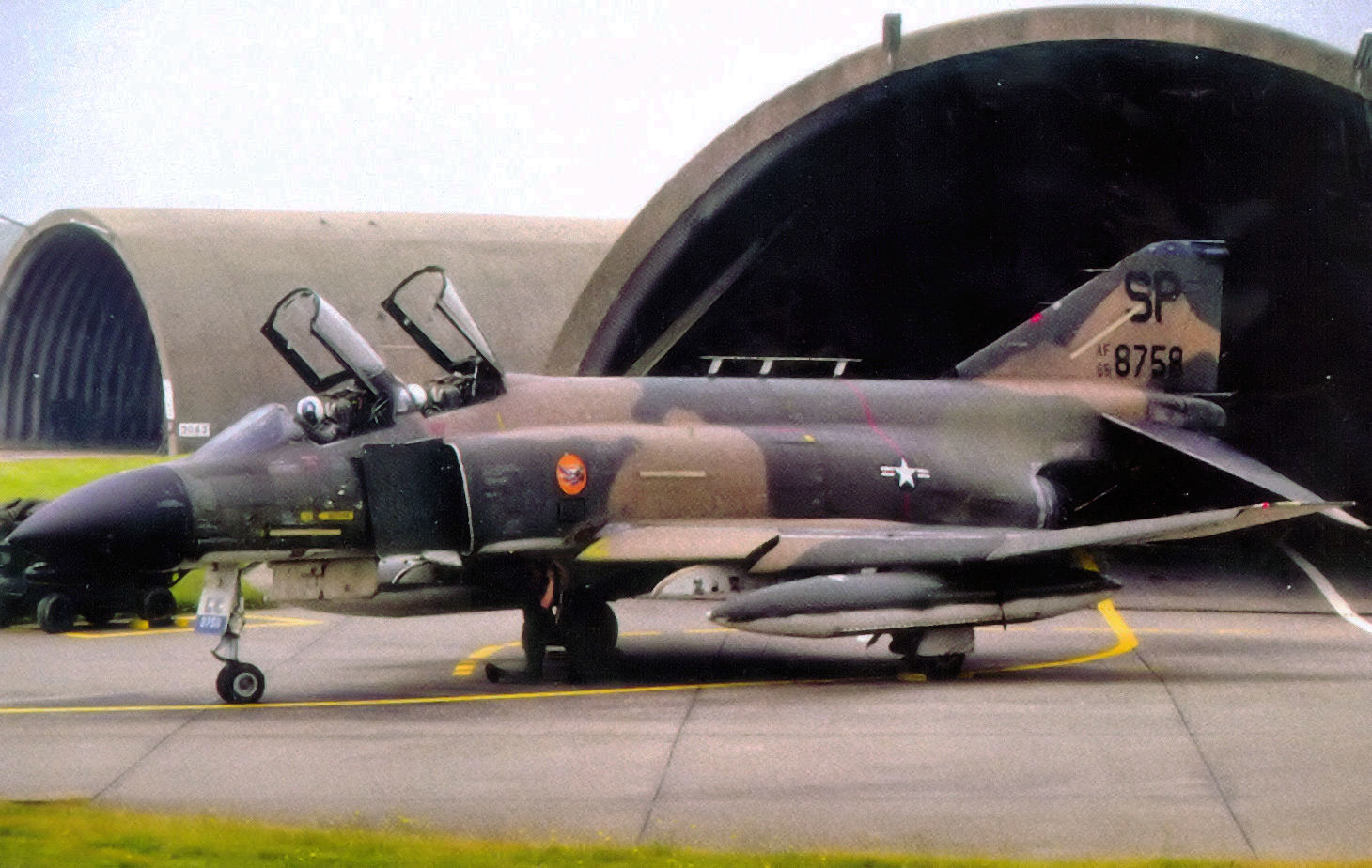
McDonnell F-4D at Spangdahlem (Note: Aircraft is McDonnell F-4D-32-MC Phantom, serial 66-8758 in 1978. This plane was old to the Republic of Korea in 1987.)

The 23d Tactical Fighter Squadron moved to Spangdahlem Air Base, Germany, and in January 1972 became part of the 52d Tactical Fighter Wing. The 23rd converted to F-4E and F-4G Wild Weasels in 1982 and began flying defense suppression missions. In July 1987, the General Dynamics F-16 Fighting Falcon replaced the F-4E.

In January 1991, at the outbreak of the Gulf War, the 23d deployed to Incirlik Air Base, Turkey. During Operation Proven Force, squadron F-16Cs and F-4Gs flew nearly 1,000 defense suppression, combat air patrol and interdiction missions over Iraq without a single loss. The squadron earned the Air Force Outstanding Unit Award with Valor for its part in driving the Iraqi army from Kuwait. On 17 January 1993 "Trigger" Stevenson shot down a MiG-23 with an AMRAAM that was challenging the no fly zone over Iraq flying F-16C 86–0262. This kill was the second kill using the AMRAAM missile and the second shoot down by USAF F-16.

In September 1991, the squadron's remaining F-4Gs were replaced by F-16Cs. In July 1993, the 23rd was the first U.S. unit to enforce the no-fly zone over Bosnia and Herzegovina for Operation Deny Flight. In January 1994, the squadron received the first F-16CJ Block 50 aircraft.

The squadron completed conversion to the latest version of the F-16CJ in January 1995 and became United States Air Forces Europe's only defense suppression squadron. In September of that same year, members of the 23rd took part in Operation Deliberate Force – the largest air assault in North Atlantic Treaty Organization (NATO) history. The unit flew 224 sorties during the air campaign against Bosnian Serb forces.

Pilots from the 23rd were the first to employ AGM-88 High-Speed Anti-Radiation Missiles in combat. The squadron's efforts contributed to the peace process and the resulting Dayton Agreement, which ended more than four years of bloody conflict in the Balkans.

For their outstanding contributions to the U.S. Air Forces in Europe's mission, the 23rd was selected in May 1996 to receive the Commander's Trophy as the "Best Fighter Squadron in the Command," their third time to win this distinction.

From February to June 1999 the squadron deployed to Aviano Air Base, Italy, where it was assigned to the 31st Air Expeditionary Wing for Operation Allied Force. The squadron supported the NATO mission to degrade and damage the military and security structure that the President of Yugoslavia used to destroy the Albanian majority in Kosovo. During Allied Force the 23rd flew over 1000 combat sorties and fired 191 HARM shots to silence over 100 surface-to-air missile sites in Kosovo and Yugoslavia. The squadron was repeatedly noted for bravery in the face of danger while flying these combat operations in Allied Force.

From November 2000 to March 2001 the 23rd deployed in support of Operation Southern Watch to patrol the southern no-fly zone over Iraq. During the deployment the squadron provided suppression of enemy air defenses in both air-to-ground and air-to-air roles. In March 2001, the 23rd provided SEAD for the largest strike in Iraq since Operation Desert Fox. During the strike to take out command and control facilities in Iraq, the 23rd ensured the safety of all allied strikers.

The squadron deployed again from April to July 2002 to Incirlik Air Base, Turkey, for Operation Northern Watch to patrol the northern no-fly zone. During the deployment the squadron was called on to provide SEAD for strikes against ground targets located in northern Iraq. Squadron pilots came under fire numerous times while providing SEAD for coalition aircraft, once firing two HARM shots suppressing an Iraqi surface radar site that targeted friendly aircraft.

In January 2003, elements of the squadron forward deployed to Southwest Asia in support of U.S. Central Command and flew combat missions during Operation Iraqi Freedom. The squadron played a key role during the 27-day air war by fulfilling its mission of suppressing enemy air defenses and destroying Iraqi radar sites.

In April 2010 20 F-16Cs were flown from Spangdahlem to the 148th Fighter Wing, Minnesota Air National Guard, one F-16 was transferred to Edwards Air Force Base, California. All aircraft were from the 22nd Fighter Squadron. As a result of the drawdown of F-16s, the 22nd and 23d Fighter Squadrons were inactivated on 13 August 2010 and their personnel and equipment used to form a single "new" squadron, the 480th Fighter Squadron.

==== Electronic Warfare ====
The 23d was reactivated as the 23d Electronic Warfare Squadron at Eglin Air Force Base, Florida, on 18 April 2025.

=== Lineage ===
- Constituted as the 23d Pursuit Squadron (Interceptor) on 22 December 1939

Activated on 1 February 1940
Redesignated 23d Fighter Squadron on 15 May 1942
Redesignated 23d Fighter Squadron, Single Engine on 20 August 1943
Inactivated on 31 March 1946

- Activated on 15 October 1946

Redesignated 23d Fighter Squadron, Jet Propelled on 27 October 1947
Redesignated 23d Fighter Squadron, Jet on 17 June 1948
Redesignated 23d Fighter-Bomber Squadron on 20 January 1950
Redesignated 23d Fighter-Day Squadron on 9 August 1954
Redesignated 23d Tactical Fighter Squadron on 8 July 1958
Redesignated 23d Fighter Squadron on 1 October 1991
Inactivated 13 August 2010

- Redesignated 23d Electronic Warfare Squadron on 16 January 2025
- Activated on 18 April 2025

=== Assignments ===
- 36th Pursuit Group (later 36th Fighter Group), 1 February 1940 – 31 March 1946
- 36th Fighter Group (later 36th Fighter-Bomber Group, 36 Fighter-Day Group), 15 October 1946
- 36th Fighter-Day Wing (later 36th Tactical Fighter Wing), 8 December 1957
- 52d Tactical Fighter Wing (later 52d Fighter Wing), 31 December 1971 (attached to 7440th Composite Wing, 17 January – 15 March 1991)
- 52d Operations Group, 31 March 1992 – 13 August 2010
- 350th Spectrum Warfare Group, 18 April 2025 – present

=== Stations ===
- Kelly Field, Texas, 1 February 1940
- Brooks Field, Texas, 1 February 1940
- Langley Field, Virginia, 17 November 1940
- Losey Field, Puerto Rico, 6 January 1941
- St. Croix Airport, Virgin Islands, 31 May 1941
- Losey Field, Puerto Rico, 15 November 1941
- Vega Baja Airfield, Puerto Rico, 13 December 1941 (detachments operated from St Thomas Airport Virgin Islands, c. Mar 1941-c. 6 May 1943 and from Arecibo Airfield, Puerto Rico, 11 March-c. 16 May 1943
- Morrison Field, Florida, c. 21 May 1943
- Mitchel Field, New York, 16 June 1943
- Charleston Army Air Field, South Carolina, 22 June 1943
- Galveston Army Air Field, Texas, 18 September 1943
- Dalhart Army Air Field, Texas, 27 October 1943
- Bruning Army Air Field, Nebraska, 24 December 1943 – 11 March 1944
- RAF Kingsnorth (AAF-418), England, 6 April 1944
- Brucheville Airfield (A-16), France, 3 August 1944
- Le Mans Airfield (A-35), France, 6 September 1944
- Athis Airfield (A-76), France, 26 September 1944
- Juvincourt Airfield (A-68), France, 3 October 1944
- Le Culot Airfield (A-89), Belgium, 28 October 1944
- Aachen Airfield (Y-46), Germany, 28 March 1945
- Niedermendig Airfield (Y-62), Germany, 8 April 1945
- Kassel-Rothwesten Airfield (R-12), Germany, 21 April 1945 – 15 February 1946
- Bolling Field, District of Columbia, 15 February – 31 March 1946
- Howard Field, Panama Canal Zone, 15 October 1946 – 22 July 1948
- Furstenfeldbruck Air Base, Germany, c. 17 August 1948
- Bitburg Air Base, Germany, 17 November 1952
- Spangdahlem Air Base, Germany, 31 December 1971 – 13 August 2010 (deployed at Incirlik Air Base, Turkey, 17 January – 15 March 1991)
- Eglin Air Force Base, Florida, 18 April 2025 – present

=== Aircraft ===
- Curtiss YP-37 (1940)
- Curtiss P-36 Hawk (1940–1942)
- Bell P-39 Airacobra (1941–1943)
- Curtiss P-40 Warhawk (1941–1943)
- Republic P-47 Thunderbolt (1943–1946)
- Lockheed P-80 (later F-80) Shooting Star (1947–1950)
- Republic F-84 Thunderjet (1950–1953)
- North American F-86 Sabre (1953–1956)
- North American F-100 Super Sabre (1956–1961)
- Republic F-105 Thunderchief (1961–1966)
- McDonnell F-4 Phantom II (1966–1991)
- General Dynamics F-16 Fighting Falcon (1987–2010)
