= 53rd Fighter Squadron =

53rd Fighter Squadron

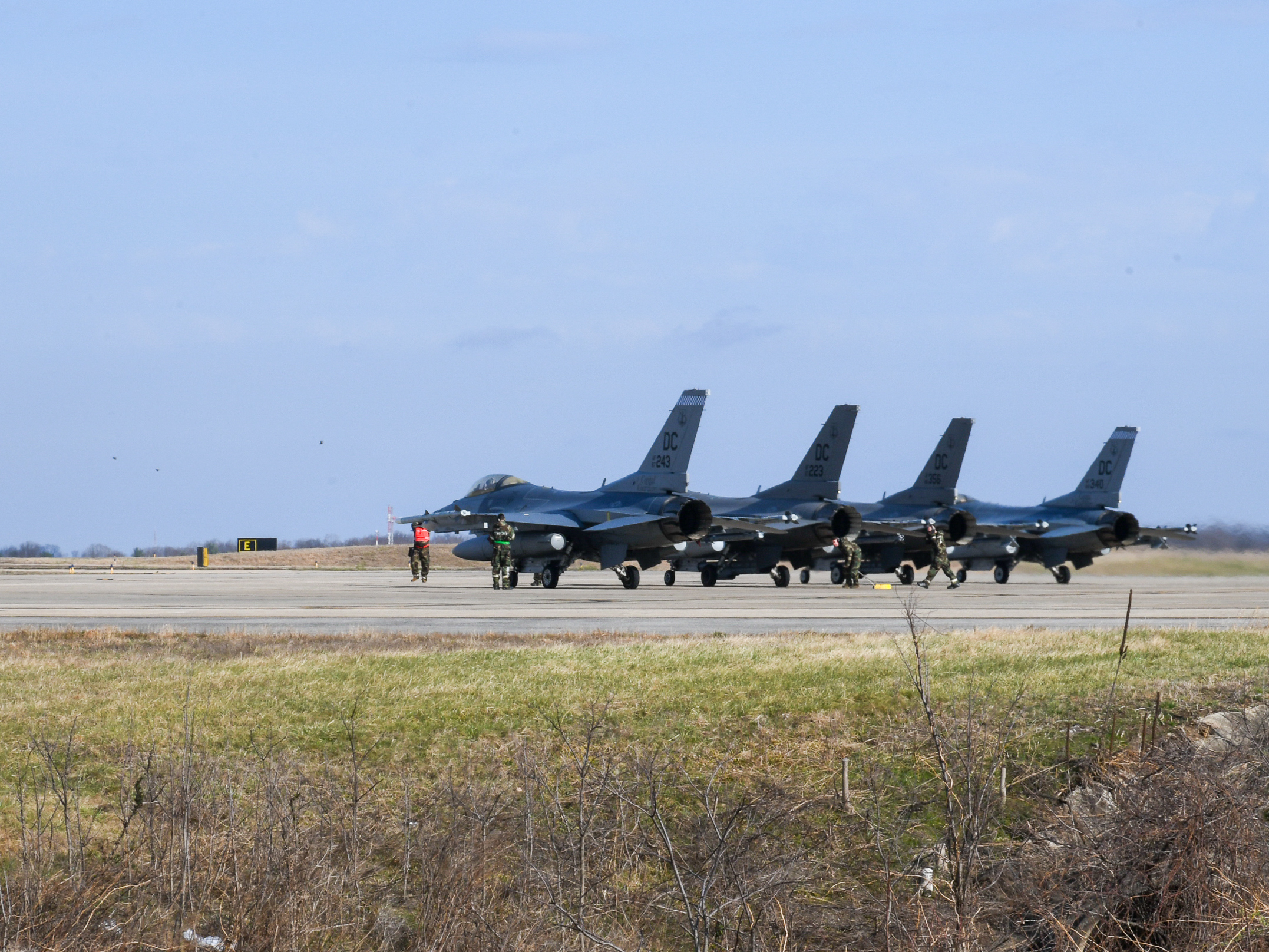
- Four F-16C Fighting Falcons of the squadron's associate, the 121st Fighter Squadron, at Joint Base Andrews in 2022
- Active: 1941–1946; 1946–1999; 2021–present
- Country: United States
- Branch: United States Air Force
- Type: Squadron
- Role: Fighter
- Part of: Air Combat Command: Fifteenth Air Force; 495th Fighter Group
- Garrison/HQ: Joint Base Andrews, Maryland
- Nickname: Tigers
- Equipment: F-16C/D Fighting Falcon
- Engagements: World War II – American Theater World War II – EAME Theater Cold War Berlin Crisis of 1961 Cuban Missile Crisis Gulf War (Southwest Asia) April 2024 Iranian strikes against Israel

- Decorations: Distinguished Unit Citation Air Force Outstanding Unit Award; Belgian Fourragère

Commanders
- Current commander: Lt. Col. Robert Glenn
- Notable commanders: Lt. Col. Brandon July Lt. Col. James Wentzel

Insignia
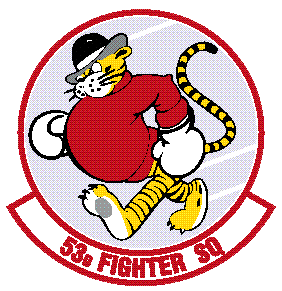
- 53d Fighter Squadron emblem (approved 28 October 1943)
- Squadron tail codes: 6V (1943 – 1946); BT (1970 – 1993); SP (1994 – 1999); DC (2021 – present)

The 53rd Fighter Squadron (53 FS) is an active unit of the United States Air Force, stationed at Joint Base Andrews, Maryland. Assigned to the 495th Fighter Group, the squadron was last activated on 10 December 2021, as an associate unit to the 113th Wing's 121st Fighter Squadron. It was previously assigned to the 52nd Operations Group and stationed at Spangdahlem Air Base, Germany, from where it operated the McDonnell Douglas F-15C/D Eagle until its inactivation on 31 March 1999.

== History ==
=== World War II ===
==== Caribbean Defense ====
Activated on 1 January 1941 as one of the three squadrons assigned to the 32nd Pursuit Group as part of the United States buildup of forces after the eruption of World War II. This unit was organized for the most part, from Puerto Rico-based units, as were many of the aircraft. It was equipped with a mixture of Curtiss P-40 Warhawks, along with Curtiss P-36A Hawk, Northrop A-17s and at least one Vultee YA-19. After being formed at Albrook Field, Panama Canal Zone, the squadron was moved to Rio Hato Army Air Base, Panama. The unit moved to La Chorrera Field on 7 January 1942 after briefly being assigned to France Field on 30 December 1941.

Along with other Pursuit Squadrons, the 53rd was redesignated as the 53rd Fighter Squadron on 15 May 1942. During late 1942, three Douglas P-70 Havoc night fighters were briefly assigned to the 53rd as, during this period, it was still considered a strong possibility that a night attack on the Panama Canal might he attempted, and the night fighter defenses of the area were nil. The P-70's departed in mid-January 1943.

Like a number of other Sixth Air Force fighter units, the 53rd effectively assumed the duties and designation of the 30th Fighter Squadron on 3 January 1943. The 30th was at La Chorrera and the 53rd at France Field at the time this "switch" took place. By April–May 1943, the unit was operating with an assortment of aircraft as a result of its "switch" with the 30th, which by then included Bell P-39D Airacobras and P-40s.

The unit moved to the United States effective 1 June 1943, ending its duty with Sixth Air Force.

==== European Theater of Operations ====
Transferred to III Fighter Command in June 1943, began training for deployment to the European Theater of Operations as a Republic P-47 Thunderbolt fighter-bomber squadron. Deployed to England in April 1944 as part of IX Fighter Command. Initial missions included strafing and dive-bombing armored vehicles, trains, bridges, buildings, factories, troop concentrations, gun emplacements, airfields, and other targets in preparation for the invasion of Normandy. The squadron also flew some escort missions with Eighth Air Force Boeing B-17 Flying Fortress and Consolidated B-24 Liberator strategic bombers.

On D-Day the squadron patrolled the air over the landing zones and by flying close-support and interdiction missions. Moved to its Advanced Landing Ground at Brucheville Airfield, France (A-16) in July, then eastward as ground forces advanced on the continent. Operations supported the breakthrough at Saint-Lô in July and the thrust of U.S. Third Army toward Germany in August and September as part of the 303rd Fighter Wing of XIX Tactical Air Command. In October, the squadron moved into Belgium to support U.S. Ninth Army.

Participated in the Battle of the Bulge during December 1944 and January 1945 by flying armed reconnaissance and close-support missions. Aided U.S. First Army's push across the Roer River in February 1945. Supported operations at the Remagen bridgehead and during the airborne assault across the Rhine in March.

By V-E Day, the squadron was based at Kassel-Rothwestern Airfield, Germany (R-12), where it remained until February 1946 as part of the United States Air Forces in Europe Army of Occupation. In February, the unit was transferred, without personnel or equipment to Bolling Field, Washington, D.C where it was inactivated as a paper unit.

=== Cold War (1946–1993) ===
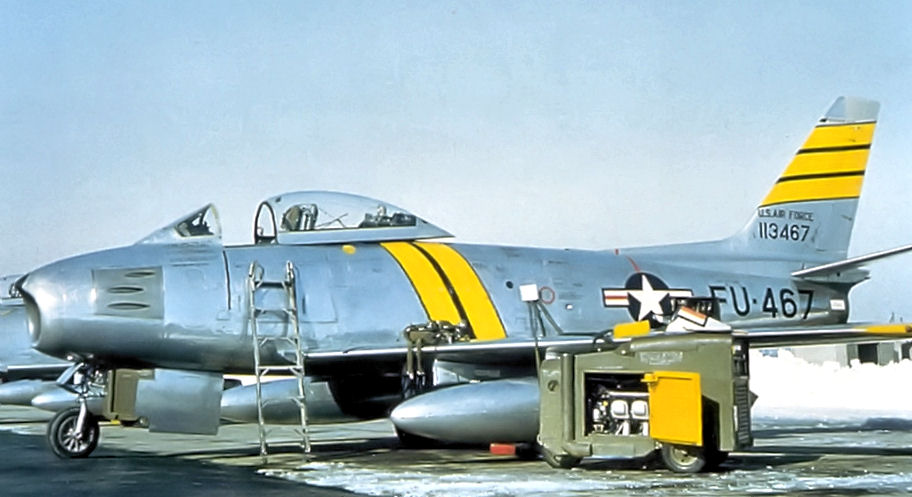
53rd FDS F-86F-25-NH Sabre - 51-13467

Reactivated in October 1946 under Caribbean Air Command in the Canal Zone, returning to its prewar mission of the defense of the Panama Canal. The squadron conducted air defense training missions for the next two years initially with P-47's. The squadron upgraded to jet aircraft in December 1947 with the arrival of the Lockheed Lockheed F-80 Shooting Star.

As a result of the Berlin Blockade and other Cold War tensions in Europe, the squadron was deployed to Germany and was reassigned to United States Air Forces in Europe during August 1948, becoming part of the third F-80 jet group assigned to USAFE. At Fürstenfeldbruck Air Base tactical operations included air defense, tactical exercises, maneuvers, and photographic reconnaissance. Upgraded to new Republic F-84E Thunderjets in 1950.

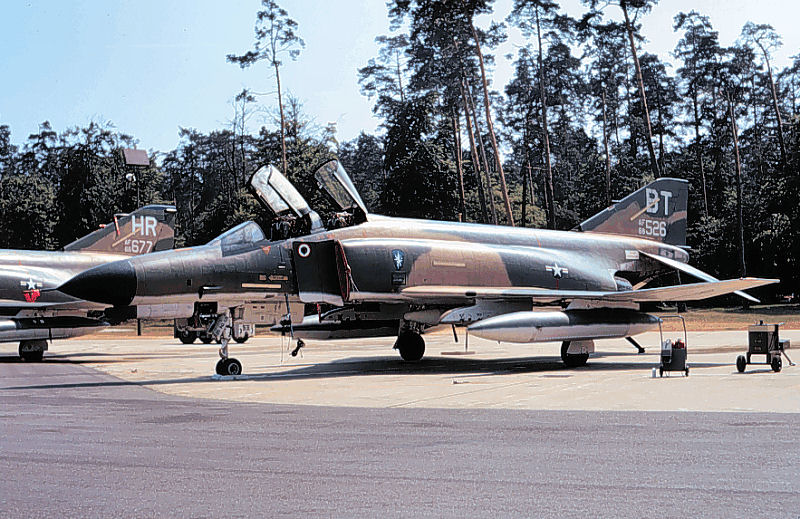
22nd TFS F-4E-30-MC Phantom - 66–7526, about 1975

Remained at Fürstenfeldbruck until 1952 when it moved to the new Bitburg Air Base, west of the Rhine River near the French border in the Eifel mountains. The air battle over Merklín voit two F-84Es intercepted by two Czechoslovak MiG-15s which shot down one on March 10, 1953.

In August 1953, the North American F-86F Sabre was introduced to the squadron, replacing the F-84s. In 1956, the squadron received the North American F-100 Super Sabre, marking the first time a wing in USAFE flew supersonic jets. On 15 May 1958, the squadron was redesignated as a tactical fighter squadron because its missions had now grown to include delivery of tactical nuclear weapons.

In May 1961, received the Republic F-105 Thunderchief and continued to carry on its Cold War mission of tactical nuclear weapons delivery. Twice in the early 1960s when Cold War tensions were elevated due to the 1961 Berlin Wall crisis and 1962 Cuban Missile Crisis the squadron rose to a high level of alert. Was upgraded to the McDonnell Douglas F-4 Phantom II in 1966.

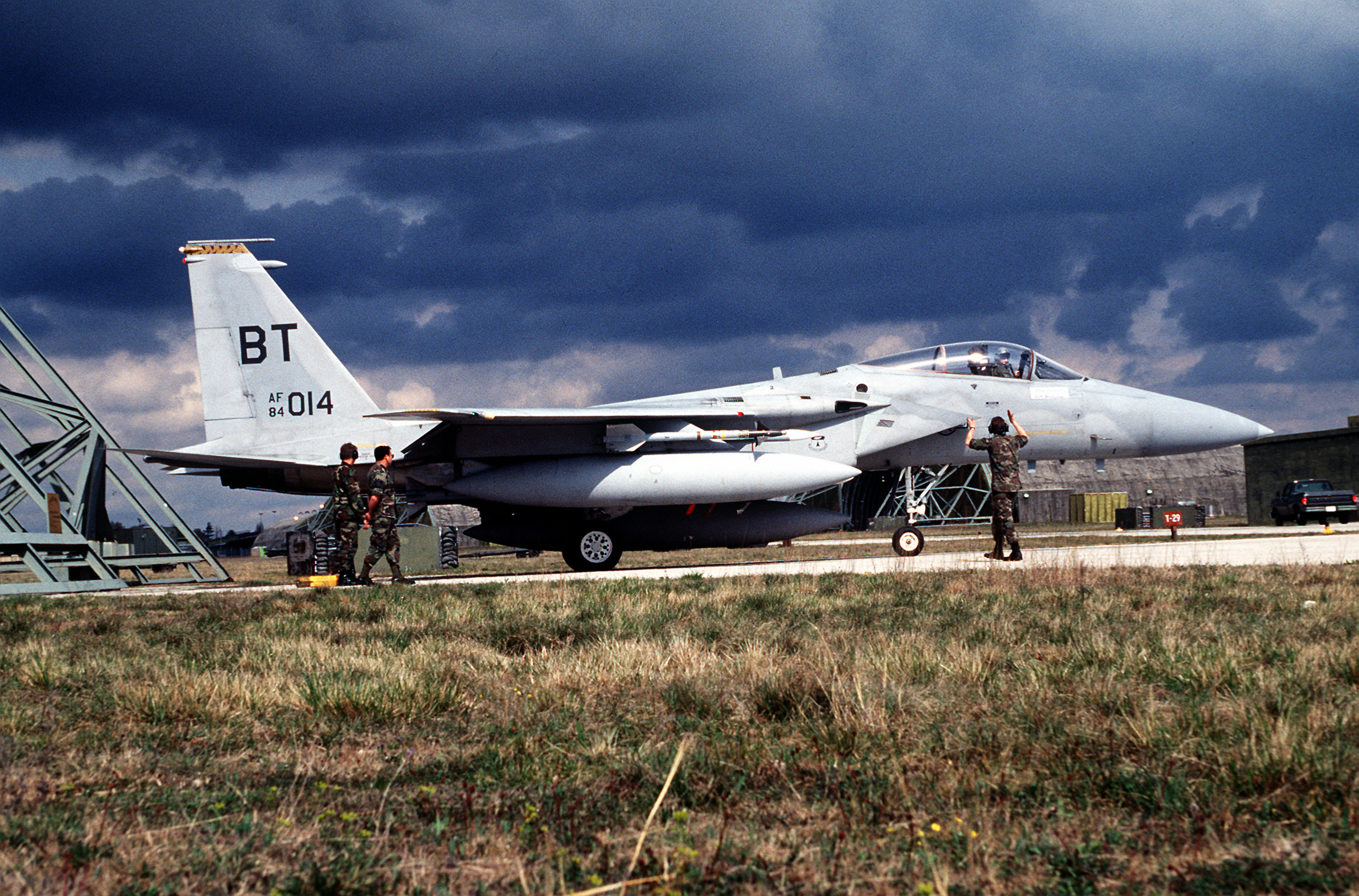
Capt. John T. Doneski in 84-14 shot down an Iraqi Su-22M with an AIM-9M during operation "Desert Storm".

The squadron was upgraded to the McDonnell Douglas F-15A Eagle in April 1976. In 1980, more advanced F-15Cs and F-15Ds would replace the original F-15As. Throughout the 1970s and 1980s, the squadron conducted routine training missions however the outbreak of the 1990–91 Gulf War put the F-15s of Bitburg into the heart of the conflict. The squadron's pilots and aircraft engaged in combat operations during Operation Desert Storm. Not a single F-15 aircraft was lost in combat during the war. In June 1991, the deployed squadron returned to Bitburg.

Bitburg Air Base was part of the 1993 Base Realignment and Closure (or BRAC) process that saw the drawdown of many military facilities in a series of post-Cold War force reductions. In July 1993, HQ USAFE announced the closure of Bitburg Air Base and the pending inactivation of the 36th Fighter Wing.

=== Spangdahlem (1994–1999) ===
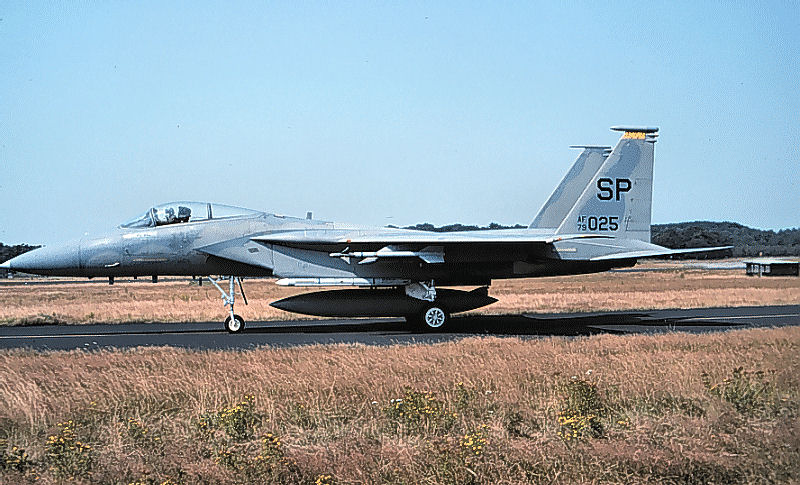
53rd Fighter Squadron F-15C Eagle 79-0025 showing "SP" Tail Code, Spangdahlem AB, Germany, 1995

The 53rd Fighter Squadron was relieved from assignment to the 36th Operations Group on 1 February 1994. It was in non-operations status until it was assigned to the 52nd Operations Group (52 FW) at Spangdahlem Air Base on 25 February 1994. At Spangdahlem the squadron supported no-fly zone operations over Bosnia and northern Iraq and other combat operations. It was during the squadron's support of the no-fly zone in northern Iraq that two of its fighters were involved in the 1994 Black Hawk shootdown incident.

One year later, another fatal crash involving the 53rd would bring the national spotlight again onto the USAF. On May 30, 1995, Major Grey 'Zane' Lowry was killed when his F-15C crashed immediately after takeoff from Spangdahlem Air Base. Investigation showed that during routine maintenance, mechanics had crossed and mis-connected the longitudinal and lateral flight control rods, wherein pulling the stick back would cause a roll, etc. Two mechanics were charged with negligent homicide, and TSgt. Thomas Mueller killed himself on the day his military trial was to start. He felt he was not being given a fair trial, as several personnel had the opportunity to catch this critical error, including the pilot himself along with the crew chief observing the before-taxi flight control check. More significantly, this cross-connection had happened at least twice before with USAF F-15 maintenance, in 1986 and 1991. The Air Force had nearly a full decade to implement a comprehensive fix so that this would never happen again. This fix was only done after Lowry's death. And after Mueller's death. It was thought that prosecution was excessive, because the Air Force at the time was being heavily criticized for no accountability for pilots who had shot down two US Army Black Hawk helicopters, also done by the 53rd (see above).

The squadron was inactivated in March 1999 as a result of an Air Force-wide reorganization to enlarge F-15 squadrons from 18 to 24 aircraft. Six of the squadron's Eagles were reassigned to the 493d Fighter Squadron at RAF Lakenheath, and the rest returned to the United States.

=== Modern Era (2021–present) ===
On 10 December 2021, the 53 FS was activated at Joint Base Andrews, Maryland, as an associate unit of the 113th Wing's 121st Fighter Squadron.

On April 13–14, 2024, 121st/53rd FS F-16Cs assisted in the defense of Israel, against an onslaught of drones and surface to air missiles launched from Iran. The 121st's/53rd's F-16Cs, operating alongside F-15Es from the 335th FS and 494th FS, were credited with over +70 kills of Iranian drones during combat air patrols.

== Lineage ==
- Constituted as the 53rd Pursuit Squadron (Fighter) on 22 November 1940

Activated on 1 January 1941
Redesignated 53rd Fighter Squadron (Twin Engine) on 15 May 1942
Redesignated 53rd Fighter Squadron on 28 September 1942
Redesignated 53rd Fighter Squadron, Single Engine on 20 August 1943
Inactivated on 31 March 1946

- Activated on 15 October 1946

Redesignated 53rd Fighter Squadron, Jet Propelled on 27 October 1947
Redesignated 53rd Fighter Squadron, Jet on 17 June 1948
Redesignated 53rd Fighter-Bomber Squadron on 20 January 1950
Redesignated 53rd Fighter-Day Squadron on 9 August 1954
Redesignated 53rd Tactical Fighter Squadron on 8 July 1958
Redesignated 53rd Fighter Squadron on 1 October 1991
Inactivated on 31 March 1999

- Activated on 10 December 2021

=== Assignments ===
- 32nd Pursuit Group (later 32nd Fighter Group), 1 January 1941
- 36th Fighter Group, 23 June 1943 – 31 March 1946
- 36th Fighter Group (later 36th Fighter-Bomber Group, 36th Fighter-Day Group), 15 October 1946 (attached to 36th Fighter-Day Wing after 1 October 1956)
- 36th Fighter-Day Wing (later 36th Tactical Fighter Wing, 36th Fighter Wing), 8 December 1957 (attached to Tactical Fighter Wing, Provisional, 4, 20 December 1990, Tactical Fighter Wing, Provisional, 4404, 20 March–1 July 1991)
- 36th Operations Group, 31 March 1992
- 52nd Operations Group, 25 February 1994 – 31 March 1999
- 495th Fighter Group, 10 December 2021 – present

=== Stations ===
- Rio Hato Air Base, Panama, 1 January 1941
- Albrook Field, Panama Canal Zone, 1 January 1941
- Rio Hato Air Base, Panama, c. 21 August 1941
- France Field, Canal Zone, c. 12 December 1941
- La Chorrera Army Airfield, Panama, 7 January–8 June 1943
- Charleston Army Air Field, South Carolina, 23 June 1943
- Biggs Field, Texas, c. 15 September 1943
- Ainsworth Army Air Field, Nebraska, 23 Nov 1943 – 11 March 1944
- RAF Kingsnorth (AAF-418), England, 5 April 1944
- Brucheville Airfield (A-16), France, c. 7 July 1944
- Le Mans Airfield (A-35), France, c. 29 August 1944
- Athis Airfield (A-76), France, c. 23 September 1944
- Juvincourt Airfield (A-68), France, 5 October 1944
- Le Culot Airfield (A-89), Belgium, c. 23 October 1944
- Aachen Airfield (Y-46), Germany, 28 March 1945
- Niedermendig Airfield (Y-62), Germany, 8 April 1945
- Kassel-Rothwestern Airfield (R-12), Germany, 20 April 1945 – 15 February 1946
- Bolling Field, District of Columbia, 15 February – 31 March 1946
- France Field, Panama Canal Zone, 15 October 1946
- Howard Field (later Howard Air Force Base), Panama Canal Zone, 1 December 1947 – 21 July 1948
- Furstenfeldbruck Air Base, Germany, c. 13 August 1948
- Bitburg Air Base, Germany, 22 July 1952
- Landstuhl Air Base (later Ramstein Air Base), Germany, 17 December 1956
- Bitburg Air Base, Germany, 3 October 1961 (deployed at Al Kharj Air Base, Saudi Arabia, 20 December 1990 – 1 July 1991)
- Spangdahlem Air Base, Germany, 25 February 1994 – 31 March 1999
- Joint Base Andrews, District of Columbia, 10 December 2021 – present

=== Aircraft ===
Aircraft operated include:

- P-26 Peashooter (1941)
- Curtiss P-36 Hawk (1941–1942)
- Curtiss P-40 Warhawk (1942–1943)
- Republic P-47 Thunderbolt (1943–1946; 1946–1947)
- Lockheed F-80 Shooting Star (1947–1950)
- Republic F-84E Thunderjet (1950–1953)
- North American F-86F Sabre (1953–1956)
- North American F-100C Super Sabre (1956–1961)
- Republic F-105D/F Thunderchief (1961–1966)
- McDonnell Douglas F-4D Phantom II (1966–1973)
- McDonnell Douglas F-4E Phantom II (1973–1977)
- McDonnell Douglas F-15A/B Eagle (1977–1980)
- McDonnell Douglas F-15C/D Eagle (1980–1994; 1994–1999)
- Lockheed Martin F-16C/D Fighting Falcon (2021–present)

== See also ==
1994 Black Hawk shootdown incident
