= 36th Operations Group =

36th Operations Group

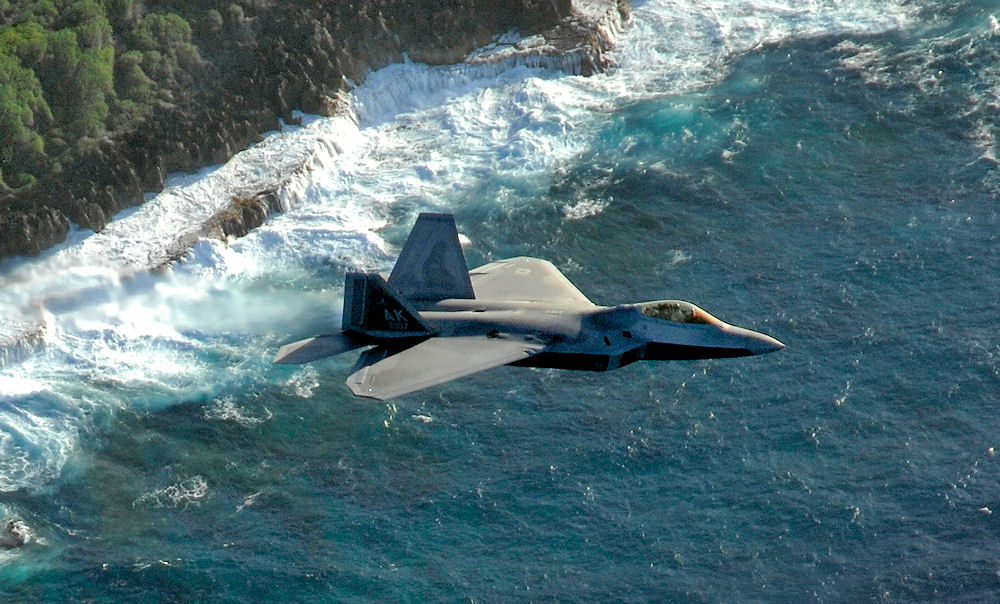
- An F-22 Raptor flies over Guam for a training mission (Note: Aircraft is a Lockheed Martin F-22A Block 30 Raptor, serial 05-4107 of the 90th Fighter Squadron deployed from the 3rd Wing at Elmendorf AFB, attached to the 36th Operations Group.)
- Active: 1940–1957; 1992–1994; 2007–present
- Country: United States
- Branch: United States Air Force
- Part of: Pacific Air Forces
- Garrison/HQ: Andersen AFB
- Motto: Prepared to Prevail (Note: This is the wing motton.)

Commanders
- Notable commanders: Glenn O. Barcus

Insignia
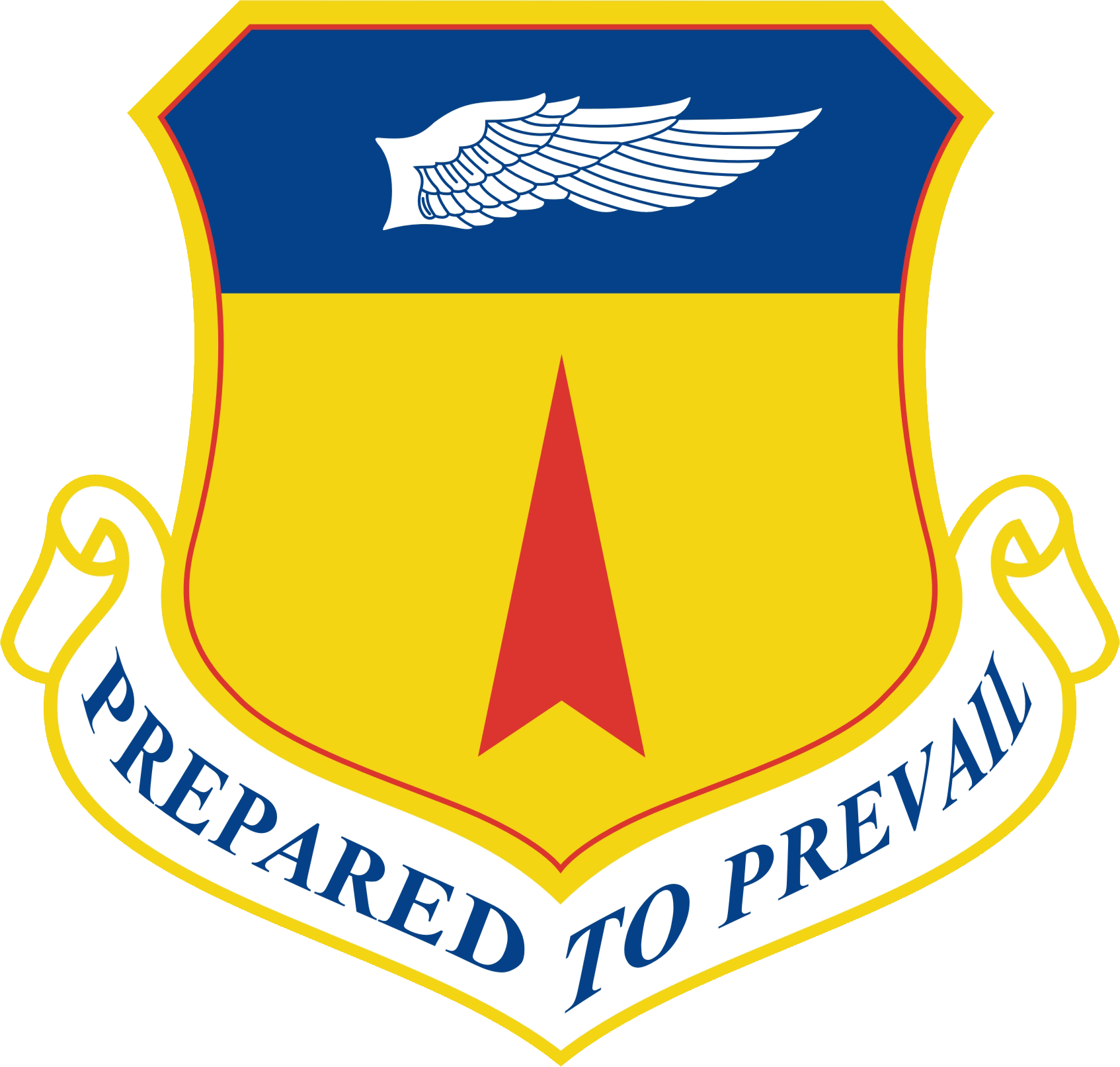
- 36th Operations Group emblem (Note: While assigned to the 36th Wing, the group uses the wing emblem with the group designation on the scroll. AF Instruction 84-105, Organizational Lineage, Honors and History, 27 April 2017, paragraph 3.3.3.)

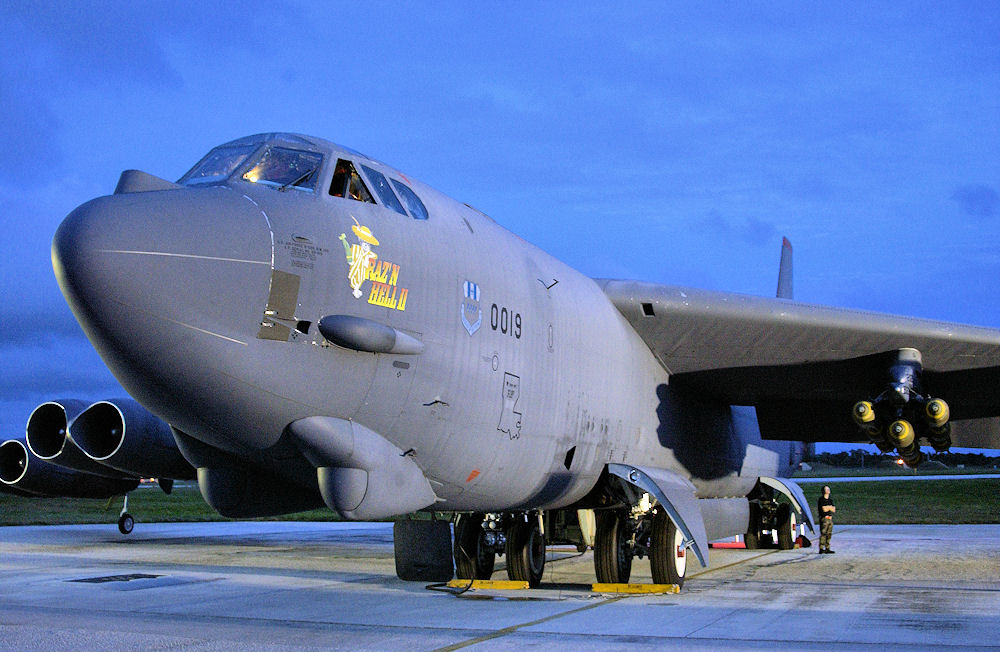
A B-52H Stratofortress (B-52H-170-BW 61-0019) deployed to Andersen Air Force Base, Guam, departs 12 February 2007 for a training mission over the Pacific Ocean. The bombers deployed from the 2nd Bomb Wing at Barksdale AFB, Louisiana, and when deployed to Andersen, are attached to the 36th Operations Group.

The 36th Operations Group is the operational component of the 36th Wing, assigned to the United States Air Force Pacific Air Forces. The group is stationed at Andersen Air Force Base, Guam.

The group's World War II predecessor unit, the 36th Fighter Group was a prewar unit deployed to the European Theater and assigned to Ninth Air Force. The group flew the Republic P-47 Thunderbolt and earned a Distinguished Unit Citation for operations on 1 September 1944 when, in a series of missions, the group attacked German columns south of the Loire River in order to disrupt the enemy's retreat across central France to Dijon.

The 36th OG assumed the mission of the 36th Expeditionary Operations Group on 14 February 2007 and established a permanent command structure for deployed Air Force units assigned to Andersen AFB.

== History ==
For related history and lineage, see 36th Wing

=== World War II ===
- Media related to 36th Fighter Group (United States Army Air Forces) at Wikimedia Commons

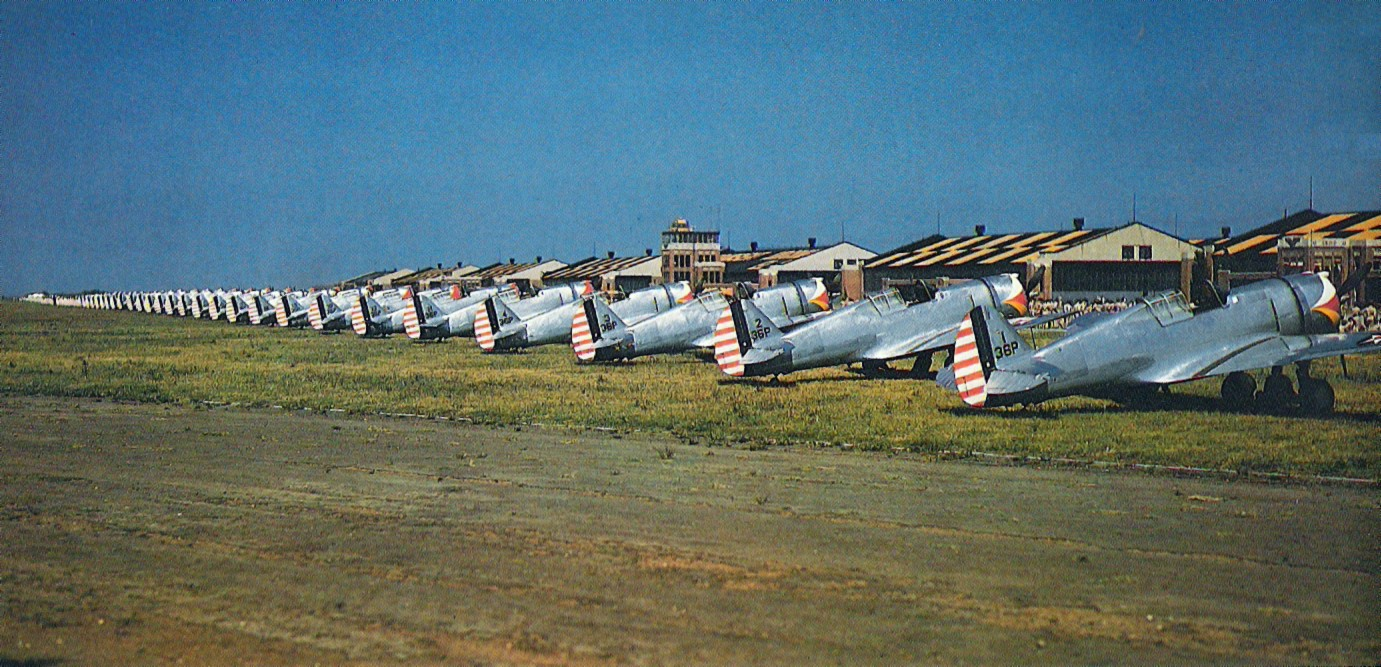
P-36As of the 36th Pursuit Group at Langley Field, Virginia, in 1940.

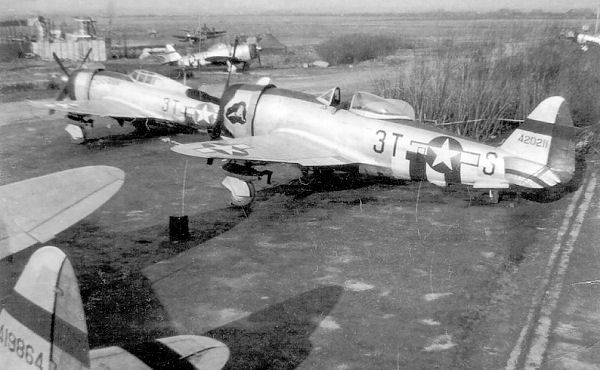
Block 28 Republic P-47Ds of the 22d Fighter Squadron at Kingsnorth Airfield, England, 1944. Serials 44-20211 and 44-19864 identifiable. Aircraft 864 was lost to ground fire on Christmas Eve of that year with LT Charles J. Loring, Jr. at the controls, and he became a POW. During the Korean War, Loring was posthumously awarded the Medal of Honor.

The 36th Pursuit Group (Interceptor) was activated on 1 February 1940 at Langley Field, Virginia. Initial training of the group was with the Curtiss P-36 Hawk.

The group moved to Losey Field, Puerto Rico in January 1941 where it was equipped with Bell P-39 Airacobras and Curtiss P-40 Warhawks. In Puerto Rico, the 36th served as part of the defense force for the Caribbean area and Panama Canal, and flew antisubmarine patrols. The group was redesignated the 36th Fighter Group in May 1942 and returned to Morrison Field, Florida where it trained with Republic P-47 Thunderbolts.

From 1942 through 1944, the 36th trained at several airfields in the United States before deploying to RAF Kingsnorth, England in April 1944 as part of Ninth Air Force, serving in combat as part of the European theater. With Ninth Air Force, the group operated primarily as a P-47 fighter-bomber organization as part of the 303d Fighter Wing, of XIX Tactical Air Command.

Operational missions included strafing and dive-bombing armored vehicles, trains, bridges, buildings, factories, troop concentrations, gun emplacements, airfields, and other targets in preparation for the Operation Overlord, the invasion of Normandy. The 36th also flew some escort missions with Eighth Air Force Boeing B-17 Flying Fortress and Consolidated B-24 Liberator strategic bombers.

The 36th participated in the June 1944 D-Day invasion of France in by patrolling the air over the landing zones and by flying close-support and interdiction missions. The group moved to its Advanced Landing Ground at Brucheville, France (A-16) in July, then eastward as ground forces advanced on the continent. Operations supported the breakthrough at Saint-Lô in July and the thrust of Third Army toward Germany in August and September.

The group earned a Distinguished Unit Citation for operations on 1 September 1944 when, in a series of missions, the group attacked German columns south of the Loire in order to disrupt the enemy's retreat across central France to Dijon. In October, the group moved into Belgium to support Ninth United States Army.

The 36th Fighter Group participated in the Battle of the Bulge during December 1944 and January 1945 by flying armed reconnaissance and close-support missions. Aided First United States Army's push across the Roer River in February 1945. Supported operations at the Remagen bridgehead and during the Operation Varsity, the airborne assault across the Rhine in March.

The group received a second Distinguished Unit Citation for performance on 12 April 1945 when the group, operating through intense anti-aircraft fire, relentlessly attacked airfields in southern Germany, destroying a large hangar and numerous aircraft.

By V-E Day, the group was based at Kassel/Rothwesten airfield, Germany (ALG R-12), where it remained until February 1946 as part of the United States Air Forces in Europe Army of Occupation. In February, the group was transferred, without personnel or equipment to Bolling Field, D.C., where the group's fighter squadrons were inactivated. From its deployment to RAF Kingsnorth into January 1945, Lt. Col. William Lewis Curry served as commanding officer. Lt. Col. Van H. Slayden and Lt. Col Paul P. Douglas Jr. served as commanders through the remaining months through V-E Day.

=== Caribbean Air Command ===
On 15 October 1946, Headquarters, 36th Fighter Group was transferred to Howard Field, Panama Canal Zone as part of the Panama Canal defense forces. In Central America, the group conducted air defense training missions for the next two years initially with P-47's. The group upgraded to jet aircraft in December 1947 with the arrival of the Lockheed F-80 Shooting Star.

On 2 July 1948, the United States Air Force 36th Fighter Wing was activated at Howard. The 36th Fighter Group became the operational component of the new Air Force wing.

=== United States Air Forces in Europe ===
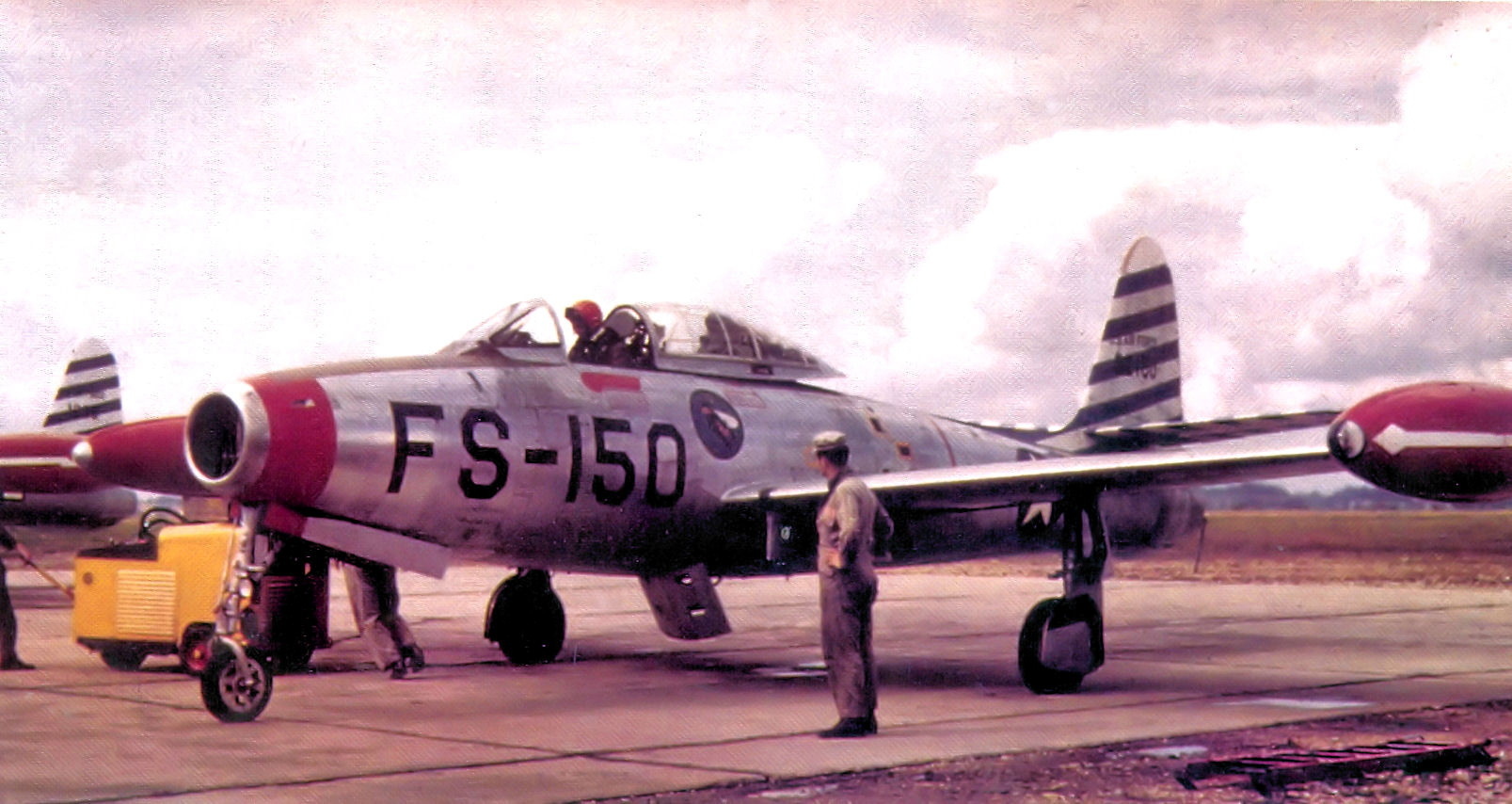
36th Fighter-Bomber Group (Note: Aircraft is Republic F-84E Thunderjet, serial 49-2150 at Fürstenfeldbruck AB, West Germany, 1950.)

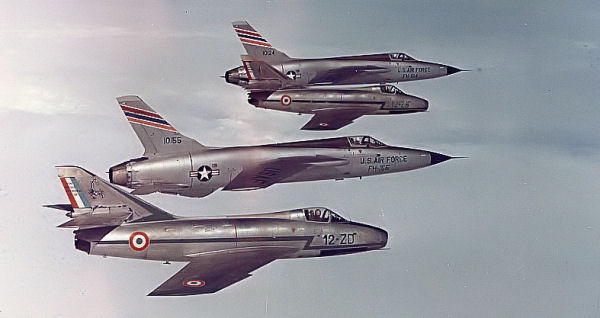
22d TFS F-105s with French Air Force Dassault Mystère B2s from Cambrai Air Base – 1964.

As a result of the Berlin Blockade and other Cold War tensions in Europe, the 36th Fighter Group was reassigned to USAFE. The squadron was stationed at Fürstenfeldbruck Air Base West Germany on 13 August 1948, being the first USAFE unit to be jet-equipped with the Lockheed F-80 "Shooting Star". At Fürstenfeldbruck tactical operations included air defense, tactical exercises, maneuvers, and photographic reconnaissance. In May 1949, the group formed the Skyblazers aerial demonstration team, which it controlled until August 1952, and again from October 1956 to January 1962 when it was disbanded.

On 20 January 1950, the group was redesignated as the 36th Fighter-Bomber Group when 89 Republic F-84E Thunderjets arrived. Existing USAFE bases in West Germany, however, were deemed very vulnerable to an attack by the Soviet Union, given their proximity to East Germany and other Warsaw Pact nations. Negotiations with other NATO nations were made to build new bases west of the Rhine. The F-80s were sent back to CONUS to equip Air National Guard units. In addition to its primary installation at Fürstenfeldbruck, the wing controlled Oberpfaffenhofen AB, West Germany, December 1949 – February 1950.

The 36th remained at Fürstenfeldbruck until 1952 when it moved to the new Bitburg Air Base, in the Eifel mountains west of the Rhine River. Throughout the summer, elements of the 36th moved into Bitburg, with the group officially arriving in November 1952.

In August 1953, the North American F-86F Sabre was introduced to the group, replacing the F-84s. On 31 March 1954, The 1st Pilotless Bomber Squadron, equipped with the BMartin B-61A Matador, was assigned to the group, making it the first operational U.S. missile unit. The 1st was renamed to the 1st Tactical Missile Squadron, and in 1958 was replaced by the 71st Tactical Missile Squadron and assigned to the 701st Tactica Missile Wing at Hahn Air Base, although it remained at Bitburg Air Base.

In August 1954, the group was redesignated the 36th Fighter-Day Group. In 1956, the group received the North American F-100 "Super Sabre," marking the first time a wing in USAFE flew supersonic jets. The group was inactivated on 8 December 1957 when parent wing adopted dual deputate organization and assigned operational squadrons directly to the wing.

On 1 October 1991 the wing was redesignated as the 36th Fighter Wing when the objective wing concept was implemented. The group was redesignated the 36th Operations Group and activated to control the operational flying squadrons of the Wing.

Bitburg Air Base was one of the bases affected by the 1993 Base Realignment and Closure Commission (or BRAC) decisions that saw the drawdown of many military facilities in a series of post-Cold War force reductions. In July 1993, HQ USAFE announced the closure of Bitburg Air Base and the pending inactivation of the 36th Fighter Wing. On 1 October 1994 the 36th Fighter Wing was inactivated along with all subordinate units.

=== Pacific Air Forces ===
The 36th Wing was reactivated without personnel or equipment at Andersen Air Force Base, Guam the same day as the 36th Air Base Wing, a non-flying organization taking over as the host unit. The former host unit, the 633d Air Base Wing, was inactivated in keeping with the Air Force Chief of Staff's policy of keeping the most highly decorated and longest serving Air Force units on active duty.

With no aircraft permanently assigned, the 36th Operations Group was not activated, but instead converted to provisional status as the 36th Expeditionary Operations Group. The group was under the control of HQ, Pacific Air Forces with a mission to support deployed aircraft to PACAF. It could, and was activated and inactivated as needed by the demands of the mission.

The 36th Operations Group was re-established as a permanent unit on 14 February 2007, replacing the temporary structure of the provisional expeditionary group for deployed Air Force units assigned to Andersen AFB.

By 2023 the 506th Expeditionary Air Refuelling Squadron was a permanent part of the group. Its aircraft and personnel were being provided by rotational Air National Guard deployments.

=== Lineage ===
- Constituted as 36th Pursuit Group (Interceptor) on 22 December 1939

Activated on 1 February 1940
Redesignated: 36th Fighter Group on 15 May 1942
Redesignated: 36th Fighter-Bomber Group on 20 January 1950
Redesignated: 36th Fighter-Day Group on 9 August 1954
Inactivated on 8 December 1957
Redesignated 36th Tactical Fighter Group on 31 July 1985 (Remained inactive)

- Redesignated 36th Operations Group on 1 March 1992

Activated on 31 March 1992
Inactivated on 1 October 1994

- Redesignated 36th Expeditionary Operations Group and converted to provisional status on 1 October 1994
- Redesignated 36th Operations Group and converted to regular status on 14 February 2007

Activated on 14 February 2007

=== Assignments ===
- GHQ Air Force, 1 February 1940
- Caribbean Defense Command, January 1941
- Caribbean Interceptor Command, 3 June 1941
- VI Interceptor (later, VI Fighter) Command, 25 October 1941
- First Air Force, 4 June 1943
- 72d Fighter Wing, 17 September 1943
- Ninth Air Force, 4 April 1944
- XXIX Tactical Air Command, 1 October 1944
- IX Tactical Air Command, 28 January 1945
- XII Tactical Air Command, 15 November 1945
- Continental Air Forces (later, Strategic Air Command), 15 February 1946
- Caribbean Defense Command, 9 September 1946
- Caribbean Air Command, 20 September 1946
- 6th Fighter Wing, 15 October 1946
- 36 Fighter Wing (later 36 Fighter-Bomber Wing, 36 Fighter-Day Wing), 2 July 1948 – 8 December 1957
- 36th Fighter Wing, 31 March 1992 – 1 October 1994
- Pacific Air Forces to activate or inactivate anytime after 1 October 1994
- 36th Wing, 14 February 2007–present

=== Components ===
- 22d Pursuit (later, 22d Fighter; 22d Fighter-Bomber; 22d Fighter-Day; 22d Fighter) Squadron, 1 February 1940 – 31 March 1946; 15 October 1946 – 8 December 1957; 31 March 1992 – 1 April 1994
- 23d Pursuit (later, 23d Fighter; 23d Fighter-Bomber; 23d Fighter-Day) Squadron, 1 February 1940 – 31 March 1946; 15 October 1946 – 8 December 1957
- 32d Pursuit (later, 32d Fighter) Squadron, 1 February 1940 – 3 August 1943; 8 September 1955 – 8 December 1957
- 53d Fighter (later, 53d Fighter-Bomber; 53d Fighter) Squadron, 23 June 1943 – 31 March 1946; 15 October 1946 – 8 December 1957; 31 March 1992 – 25 February 1994
- 497th Combat Training Flight, 2006–present

=== Stations ===
- Langley Field, Virginia, 1 February 1940
- Losey Field, Puerto Rico, 6 January 1941
- Morrison Field, Florida, 1 June 1943
- Mitchel Field, New York, 4 June 1943
- Charleston Army Air Field, South Carolina, 22 June 1943
- Alamogordo Army Air Field, New Mexico, 17 September 1943
- Scribner Army Air Field, Nebraska, 26 November 1943
- Camp Shanks, New York, 13–23 March 1944
- RAF Kingsnorth (AAF-418), England, 4 April 1944
- Brucheville Airfield (A-16), France, 4 July 1944
- Le Mans Airfield (A-35), France, 25 August 1944
- Athis Airfield (A-76), France, c. September 1944
- Juvincourt Airfield (A-68), France, c. 1 October 1944
- Le Culot Airfield (A-89), Belgium, 27 October 1944
- Aachen Airfield (Y-46), Germany, 26 March 1945
- Niedermendig Airfield (Y-62), Germany, c. 8 April 1945
- Kassel-Rothwestern Airfield (R-12), Germany, c. 21 April 1945
- Bolling Field, DC, 15 February – 9 September 1946
- Howard Field, Panama Canal Zone, 15 October 1946 – 15 July 1948
- Fürstenfeldbruck Air Base, Germany (Later West Germany), 13 August 1948
- Bitburg Air Base, West Germany, 17 November 1952 – 8 December 1957
- Bitburg Air Base, Germany, 31 March 1992 – 1 October 1994
- Andersen Air Force Base, Guam, 14 February 2007–present

=== Aircraft assigned ===
- P-36 Hawk, P-39 Airacobra, P-40 Warhawk, 1940–1943
- P-47 Thunderbolt, 1943–1946
- F-47 Thunderbolt, 1946–1947
- Lockheed F-80 Shooting Star, 1947–1950
- Republic F-84 Thunderjet, 1950–1953
- North American F-86 Sabre, 1953–1956
- North American F-100 Super Sabre, 1956–1957
- McDonnell F-15 Eagle, 1978–1994.
