= RAF Kingsnorth =

RAF Kingsnorth may refer to one of two separate military airfields in Kent, which were located at two different places in Kent and operated in two distinct periods.

- RAF Kingsnorth, (1918-24) formerly RNAS Kingsnorth (1914–1918) on the Isle of Grain
- RAF Kingsnorth (World War II), (1943–45) at Kingsnorth near Ashford, Kent
