= RAF Kingsnorth (World War II) =

WWII allied airfield

RAF Kingsnorth USAAF Station AAF-418
- Near Kingsnorth, Kent in England
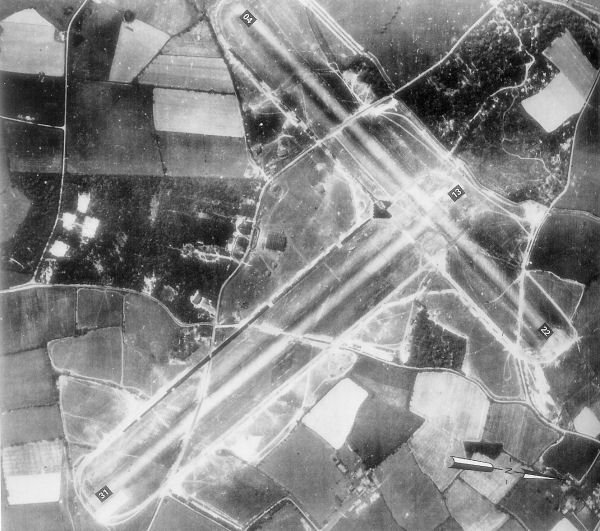
- Kingsnorth airfield, 12 May 1944, photo oriented to the west (top), taken about three weeks before D-Day. The crossroads in the middle of the picture is Bliby Corner, with Sevington Lane running left-right and Chequertree Lane going top-bottom.

Site information
- Type: RAF Advanced landing ground
- Code: IN
- Owner: Air Ministry
- Operator: Royal Air Force; United States Army Air Forces 1944
- Controlled by: RAF Fighter Command 1943-44 * No. 83 Group RAF; Second Tactical Air Force; Ninth Air Force

Location
- Shown within Kent RAF Kingsnorth (the United Kingdom)
- Coordinates: 51°6′18″N 0°53′20″E

Site history
- Built: 1943
- Built by: RAF Airfield Construction Service
- In use: July 1943 - January 1945
- Battles/wars: European theatre of World War II

Airfield information
- Elevation: 38 metres (125 ft) AMSL
Runways
Direction	Length and surface
04/22	Sommerfeld Tracking
13/31	Sommerfeld Tracking

Royal Air Force Kingsnorth or more simply RAF Kingsnorth is a former Royal Air Force Advanced landing ground in Kent, England. It was at Bliby Corner approximately 2 miles (3.2 km) southeast of Ashford. It is not to be confused with RNAS Kingsnorth, later RAF Kingsnorth, which was an airship station in operation during and after the First World War.

Opened in 1943, Kingsnorth was one of a number of prototype temporary Advanced Landing Ground airfields built, with more to be built in France after D-Day, as the Allied forces moved east across France and Germany. Kingsnorth was used by British, Dominion and the United States Army Air Forces until it was closed in September 1944.

Today the airfield is agricultural land with few remains visible on the ground, although sections of the runways can clearly be made out on aerial and satellite photos.

== History ==
The USAAF Ninth Air Force required several temporary Advanced Landing Ground (ALG) along the channel coast prior to the June 1944 invasion of Normandy to provide tactical air support for the ground forces landing in France.

=== RAF Fighter Command use ===
RAF units and aircraft
Unit	Dates	Aircraft	Variant	Notes
No. 19 Squadron RAF	August–September 1943	Supermarine Spitfire	IX	Controlled by No. 122 Airfield Headquarters
No. 65 (East India) Squadron RAF	July–October 1943	Supermarine Spitfire	IX	Controlled by No. 122 Airfield Headquarters
No. 122 (Bombay) Squadron RAF	July–October 1943	Supermarine Spitfire	IX	Controlled by No. 122 Airfield Headquarters
No. 184 Squadron RAF	August 1943	Hawker Hurricane	IV	Controlled by No. 122 Airfield Headquarters
No. 602 (City of Glasgow) Squadron AAF	July–August 1943	Supermarine Spitfire	VB	Controlled by No. 122 Airfield Headquarters
No. 2809 Squadron RAF Regiment		N/A	N/A	Airfield Defence
No. 122 Airfield Headquarters RAF	July-October 1943	N/A	N/A	

=== USAAF use ===
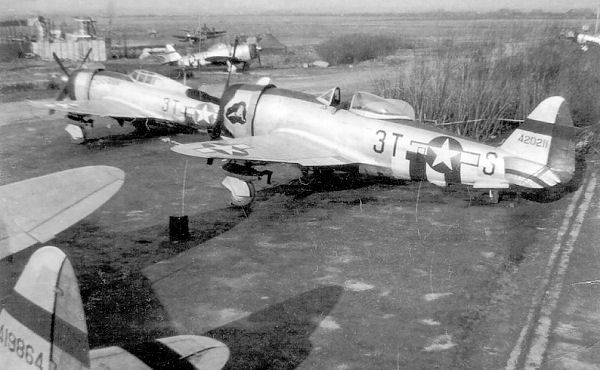
Republic P-47Ds of the 22d Fighter Squadron at Kingsnorth 1944.

Kingsnorth was known as USAAF Station AAF-418 for security reasons by the USAAF during the war, and by which it was referred to instead of location. Its USAAF Station Code was "KN".

==== 36th Fighter Group ====
The availability date of 1 April 1944 was achieved and between the 4th and 6th of that month approximately 1,500 men of the 36th Fighter Group arrived at Kingsnorth airfield from Scribner Army Airfield, Nebraska flying Republic P-47 Thunderbolts. Operational fighter squadrons and fuselage codes were:

- 22d Fighter Squadron (3T)
- 23d Fighter Squadron (7U)
- 53d Fighter Squadron (6V)

The 36th Fighter Group was part of the 303d Fighter Wing, XIX Tactical Air Command.

Movement to the Continent commenced during the first week of July when the 53rd Fighter Squadron transferred to its Advanced Landing Ground (ALG) at Brucheville, France (ALG A-16) as a forward base. The other two squadrons continued to operate from Kingsnorth until early August, the main body of the group preparing to move on the 2nd. Within a few days all personnel were gone and the airfield was deserted.

== Current use ==
With the facility released from military control, the former airfield was returned rapidly to agricultural use and within a very short period there was little to indicate that RAF Kingsnorth had existed. Today the only evidence of the airfield's existence is a slight outline of the southeast end of runway 13, visible in aerial photographs.

== Directions ==
Kingsnorth Airfield is on the east side of the A2070 just south of Ashford, about 1 mile south of Bad Munsterfeld road just after the loop heading southwards. The main airfield was in the field northwest of Bliby Corner crossroads, although the runways can be traced to south of Chequertree Lane.

== See also ==
- List of former Royal Air Force stations
