= Brucheville Airfield =

Brucheville Airfield Advanced Landing Ground (ALG) A-16
- Manche, Basse-Normandie Region, France
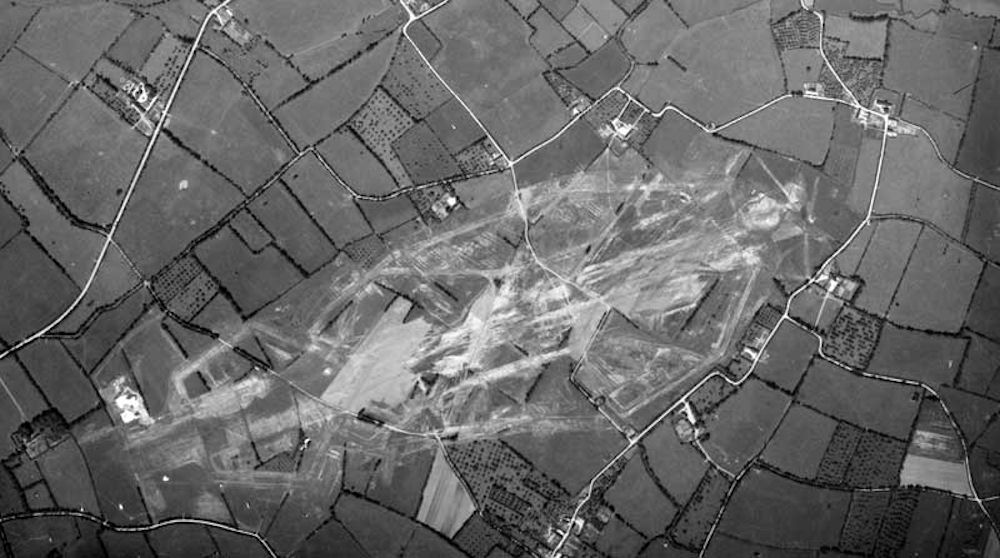
- Remains of Brucheville Airfield (A-16) after dismantling by the IX Engineering Command

Site information
- Type: Military Airfield
- Controlled by: United States Army Air Forces

Location
- Coordinates: 49°22′05″N 001°13′18″W

Site history
- Built by: IX Engineering Command
- In use: August–September 1944
- Materials: Prefabricated Hessian Surfacing (PHS)
- Battles/wars: World War II - EAME Theater: Normandy Campaign; Northern France Campaign

Garrison information
- Garrison: Ninth Air Force
- Occupants: 36th Fighter Group

Airfield information
Runways
Direction	Length and surface
07/25	5,000 feet (1,520 m) SMT/PSP
- One runway, 4 alert pads, 50 hardstands

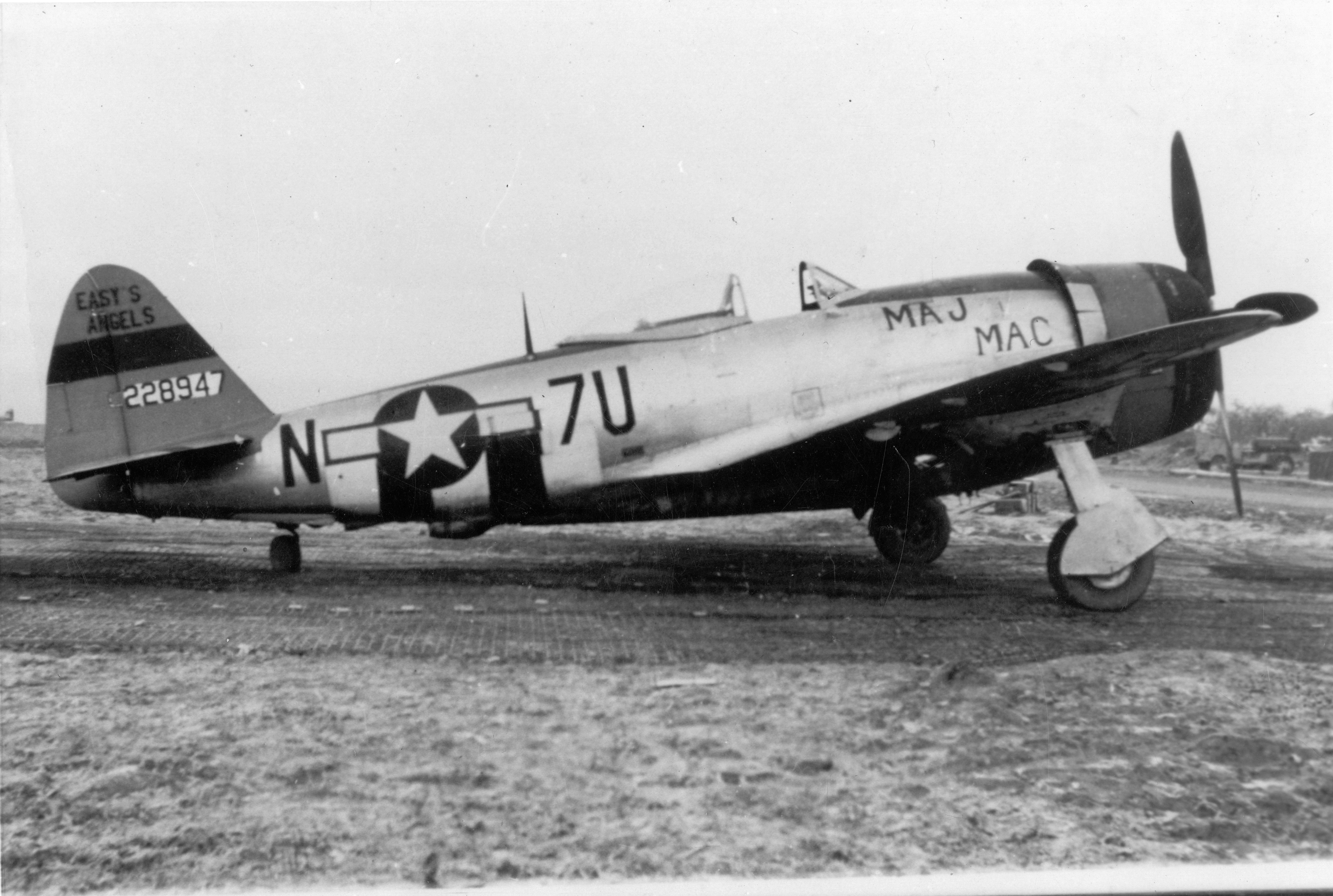
A P-47 Thunderbolt (serial number 42-28947) nicknamed "Maj Mac" of the 36th Fighter Group assigned to Lt MW "Maggie" Magnusson

Brucheville Airfield is an abandoned World War II military airfield, which is located near the commune of Brucheville in the Normandy region of northern France.

Located in the vicinity of Brucheville, the United States Army Air Force established a temporary airfield on 6 July 1944, shortly after the Allied landings in France The airfield was constructed by the IX Engineering Command, 843d Engineer Aviation Battalion.

== History ==
Known as Advanced Landing Ground "A-16", the airfield consisted of a single 5000' (1500m) Prefabricated Hessian Surfacing/Compressed Earth runway (3600 PHS/1400 ETH) aligned 07/25.

In addition, tents were used for billeting and also for support facilities; an access road was built to the existing road infrastructure; a dump for supplies, ammunition, and gasoline drums, along with a drinkable water and minimal electrical grid for communications and station lighting.

The 36th Fighter Group, based P-47 Thunderbolt fighters at Brucheville from 4 July though 25 August 1944. Lt. Col. William Lewis Curry served as commanding officer of the fighter group during this time.

The fighter planes flew support missions during the Allied invasion of Normandy, patrolling roads in front of the beachhead; strafing German military vehicles and dropping bombs on gun emplacements, anti-aircraft artillery and concentrations of German troops in Normandy and Brittany when spotted.

After the Americans moved east into Central France with the advancing Allied armies, the airfield was used as a resupply and casualty evacuation airfield, before being closed on 5 September 1944. The land was returned to agricultural use.

== Major units assigned ==
- 36th Fighter Group 4 July - 25 August 1944

22d (3T), 23d (7U), 53d (6V) Fighter Squadrons (P-47)

== Current use ==
Today there is little or no physical evidence of the airfield's existence, with the land being a mixture of grass meadows, agricultural fields.

A memorial to the men and units that were stationed at Brucheville Airfield is located on the D 913, Carentan Mont-Sainte Marie, 1 km before arriving at Sainte Marie du Mont turn right on the D 424 E toward Brucheville. The monument of the aerodrome A 16 is to the left a few hundred meters.

== See also ==
- Advanced Landing Ground
