= Mendig Air Base =

Mendig Air Base Heeresflugplatz Mendig Advanced Landing Ground Y-62
- IATA: none; ICAO: EDRE (formerly ETHM)

Summary
- Airport type: Military
- Owner: Federal Ministry of Defence
- Operator: German Army
- Location: Mendig
- Built: 1930s
- In use: 1930s-2008
- Occupants: German Army Aviators School (Closed)
- Elevation AMSL: 597 ft (182 m)
- Coordinates: 50°21′55″N 07°18′45″E

Map
- Location within Germany

Runways
Direction	Length		Surface
Direction	ft	m	Surface
08/26	5,342	1,628	Asphalt

Mendig Air Base (German: "Heeresflugplatz Mendig") is a former military air base located southeast of the city of Mendig, Rhineland-Palatinate, Germany.

It was home of German Army Medium Transport Helicopter Regiment 35, equipped with CH-53D helicopters. The regiment was disbanded in 2004. The air base was closed on 31 December 2007 with the last personnel leaving the base on 30 June 2008.

== History ==
Niedermendig Air Base (Fliegerhorst Niedermendig) was opened as a Luftwaffe airfield in 1938. Its prewar use is undetermined. After the breakout of World War II, Zerstörergeschwader 26 (ZG 26), a Messerschmitt Bf 110 unit used in the Battle of France was assigned in May 1940. In September 1944, Aufklärungsgruppe 123 (Scouting Group 123), equipped with Focke-Wulf Fw 189 used the airfield to monitor the advancing Allied armies moving east from France.

American Army units moved into the Mendig area in early March 1945 as part of the Western Allied invasion of Germany and the airfield was attacked by Ninth Air Force Martin B-26 Marauder medium bombers and Republic P-47 Thunderbolt fighter-bombers to deny the retreating German forces use of the facility. The airfield was taken about 14 March. Combat engineers from IX Engineer command moved in with the 830th Engineering Aviation Battalion arriving on 10 March 1945, to repair the field for use by combat aircraft. The engineers laid down a 5000' Pierced Steel Planking all-weather runway over the bomb-cratered concrete runway, and performed minimal repairs to the facility to make it operational. On 17 March, the airfield was declared ready for Allied use and was designated as Advanced Landing Ground "Y-62 Niedermendig".

Once repaired, the Ninth Air Force 36th Fighter Group moved in, the first being the 474th Fighter Group, flying P-47 Thunderbolts from the field from late March until early April. The Thunderbolts attacked German army units, bridges and other ground targets of opportunity throughout Germany. When the 36th moved out on 8 April, Niedermendig was used for combat resupply and casualty evacuation by Douglas C-47 Skytrain transports until the end of the war in May.

With the end of the war, Niedermendig Air Base was closed on 11 May 1945. The ground station was taken over by Army units as part of the occupation force. United States Army forces moved out of Niedermendig in the late summer of 1945, as French forces moved into the Rhineland as part of their occupation zone of Germany.

On 7 January 1957, the reconstituted German Army Aviation Corps took over Niedermendig air base from the French Armed Forces and re-established a German military presence on the facility. Dornier Do 27 light training aircraft were used for pilot training at the base. On 9 March 1959, SA3 18 Alouette II Helicopters arrived at the airfield. For more than 40 years, this helicopter was to be the training helicopter of the German Army Aviation Corps. The first German Army Aviators School was founded in Niedermendig on 1 July 1959. Its first commanding officer was Colonel Kuno Ebeling.

== Current use ==
After the military drew out in 2008, the airfield was converted to civilian use, under the ICAO code EDRE. It is home to an aeroclub Sportfluggruppe Mendig e.V., and serves as the setting for several automobile-related television and film recordings, examples are DSF-Motor, Kabel 1 - Abenteuer Auto, RTL2 - Grip, VOX Automobil or SWR Rasthaus.

The field's former MBB Bo105 hangars at the north-west side now host aircraft builder Roland Aircraft.

From 2015 to 2017 the airfield was also the new home of the rock festival Rock am Ring until it returned to the Nürburgring again.

Since 2024, the Ahmadiyya Muslim Community holds its annual Jalsa Salana meeting at the air base.

== See also ==
- Advanced Landing Ground
