= Athis Airfield =

Athis Airfield Advanced Landing Ground (ALG) A-76

- Champagne-Ardenne Region, France Athis Airfield (France)

Site information
- Type: Military Airfield
- Controlled by: United States Army Air Forces

Location
- Coordinates: 49°01′58″N 004°05′48″E

Site history
- Built by: Luftwaffe Bodenorganisation and IX Engineering Command
- In use: Sep 1944-August 1945
- Materials: Sod and Square-Mesh Track (SMT)
- Battles/wars: Western Front (World War II); Northern France Campaign

Athis Airfield was a World War II military airfield located approximately 1 km northeast of Athis, approximately 130 km east-northeast of Paris.

It was used by the Luftwaffe, then by the United States Army Air Forces during World War II. After the war, the site was abandoned and is now agricultural fields.

== History ==
Athis was a World War II airfield constructed by the Germans in August 1944. Construction began in July 1944 and it consisted of grass runways and simple support services. It lay to the northeast of Athis village and to the southwest of Tours-sur-Marne. The base was on flat, former agricultural fields bordered to the north by woodland in which aircraft and services were concealed. The airfield is referred to by several names in Luftwaffe and Allied documents including "Tours-sur-Marne", "Athis" and "Bisseuil".

=== German use during World War II ===
It became operational on 10 August 1944, when II./Jagdgeschwader 3 (JG 3) was assigned to it with Messerschmitt Bf 109G day interceptor fighters. On 20 August 1944, II./JG 3 was replaced by III./Jagdgeschwader 76 (JG 76), also flying Bf 109Gs until the end of the month when the Germans were driven from the area by the advancing Allied armies.

On 22 August Athis came under attack by elements of the 354th Fighter group, Ninth Air Force conducting a fighter-sweep across northern France. P-51 Mustangs and P-47 Thunderbolts from the 354th attacked Luftwaffe aircraft shortly after they took off from Athis, claiming 8 Bf 109s shot down.

=== American use ===
On 4 September 1944 the IX Engineer Command 826d Engineer Aviation Battalion moved in and began a quick rehabilitation of the base so it could be used by American aircraft. The engineers laid down a Square-Mesh Track (SMT) surface to form a NE/SE runway for aircraft use.

In addition to the airfield, tents were used for billeting and also for support facilities; an access road was built to the existing road infrastructure; a dump for supplies, ammunition, and gasoline drums, along with a drinkable water and minimal electrical grid for communications and station lighting.

It was declared operationally ready for Ninth Air Force combat units in September being designated as Advanced Landing Ground "A-76 Athis Airfield" Almost immediately, the 36th Fighter Group moved in, flying P-47 Thunderbolts from the field until 1 October.

Athis airfield was turned over to French authorities on 4 October 1945.

=== Postwar ===
In French control after the war, the airfield sat abandoned for several years. There was much unexploded ordnance at the site which needed to be removed, as well as the wreckage of German and American aircraft. It was cleared and returned to agricultural use and very little sign of it exists today. (Épernay-Plivot Airport (IATA: XEP, ICAO: LFSW)) is located to the south east of the wartime Athis site.

== See also ==
- Advanced Landing Ground
