= Pilotless Bomber Squadron =

Unmanned aerial vehicles

Pilotless Bomber Squadron may refer to various military units for unmanned aerial vehicles (drones):

- 1st Pilotless Bomber Squadron, a USAF unit initially designated the First Pilotless Bomber Squadron (Light) in October 1951
- 2nd Pilotless Bomber Squadron
- 11th Pilotless Bomber Squadron (1954-5), a USAF unit that became the 11th Tactical Missile Squadron
- 69th Pilotless Bomber Squadron
- Pilotless Aircraft Unit (1945-tbd), a Navy Bureau of Aeronautics unit at NAS Mojave with a detachment at Point Mugu
