= 71st Tactical Missile Squadron =

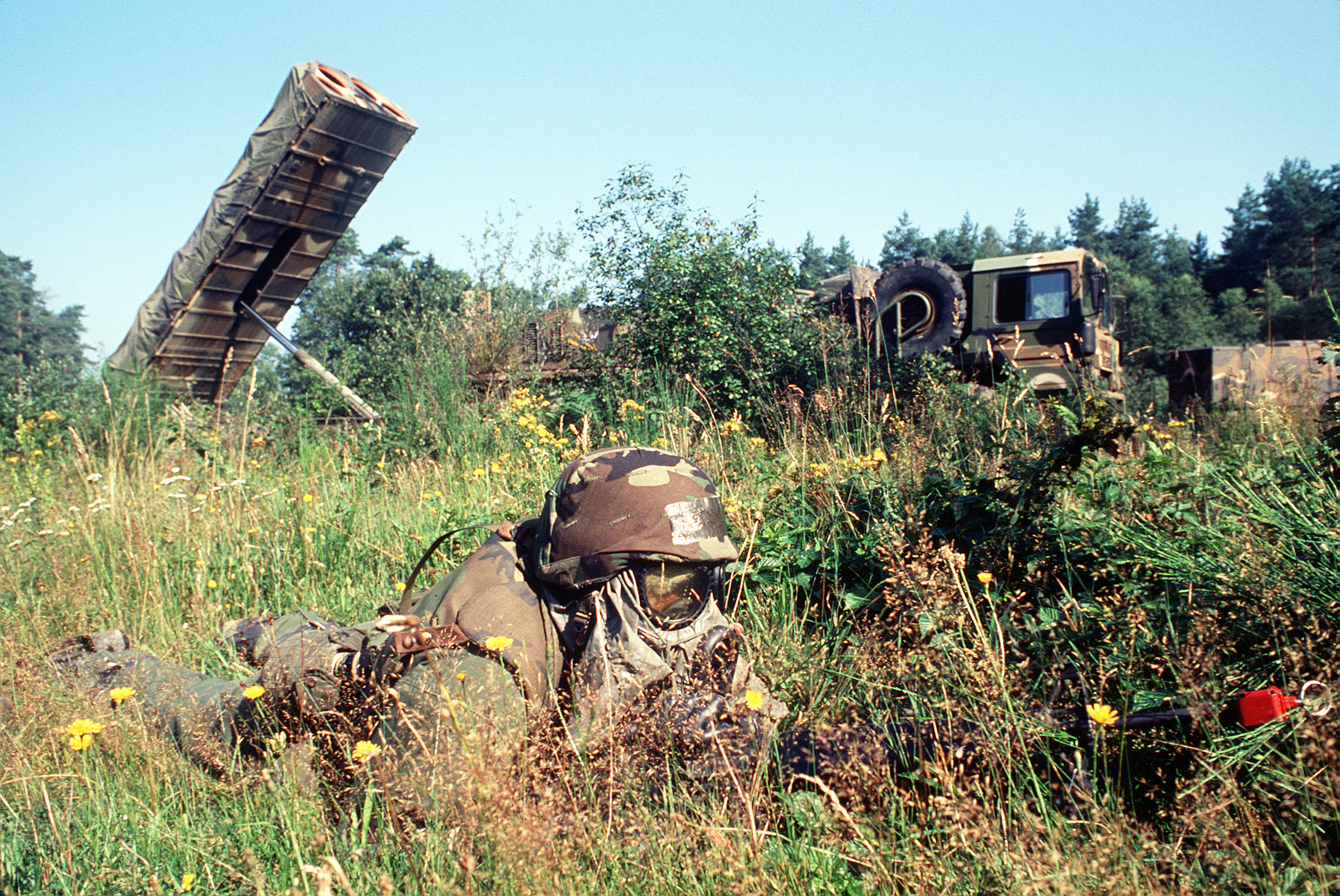
- A squadron BGM-109G missile being readied for a simulated launch
- Active: 1941–1949; 1953–1969; 1972–1973; 1973–1975; 1984-1989
- Country: United States
- Branch: United States Air Force
- Role: cruise missile
- Nickname: Wolf Pack (World War II)
- Mottos: Semper Primus (Latin for 'Always First')
- Engagements: Southwest Pacific Theater
- Decorations: Distinguished Unit Citation; Air Force Outstanding Unit Award; Philippine Presidential Unit Citation

Insignia
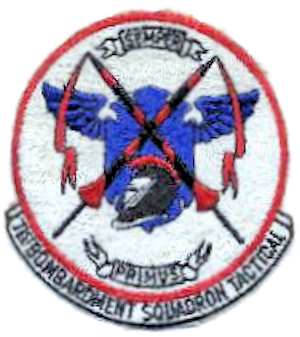
- patch with 71st Tactical Missile Squadron emblem (Note: Approved 21 June 1956. The official version of this emblem places the helmet atop the shield, rather than in front of it and the motto on a scroll beneath the emblem disc. Description :On a white disc, edged red, over a winged escutcheon Air Force blue, outline and detail black, two lances in saltire, of the last [color] and red, tipped with red streamers; above the escutcheon a knight's helmet black, visor and ornamentation of the first, crested red.)

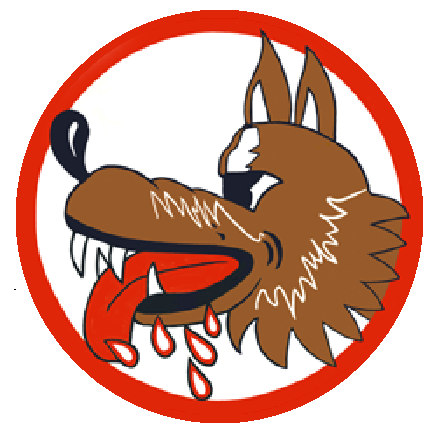
- 71st Bombardment Squadron emblem (World War II)

The 71st Tactical Missile Squadron is an inactive United States Air Force unit. It was last assigned to the 485th Tactical Missile Wing at Florennes Air Base, Belgium, where it was inactivated on 30 September 1989 with the implementation of the Intermediate-Range Nuclear Forces Treaty.

The squadron was first activated as the 71st Bombardment Squadron in 1941 as the United States built up its military forces prior to World War II. Shortly after the attack on Pearl Harbor, the squadron deployed to the Southwest Pacific Theater, participating in combat until V-J Day, moving forward from Australia to Okinawa. It earned four Distinguished Unit Citations for its actions during the war. The 71st moved to Japan as part of the occupation forces, although it was only partly manned and equipped for some of this time. The squadron was inactivated in 1949 as the Defense budget was reduced.

The squadron was again activated in France in 1953, when it replaced an Air National Guard unit that had been mobilized for the Korean War and was being returned to state control. In 1958, the squadron moved on paper to Germany, where it became the 71st Tactical Missile Squadron, taking over the missiles and personnel of another squadron, which was inactivated. It upgraded to the TM-76B Mace in 1962 and continued to operate the missile until the Mace was removed from operations in 1969.

The squadron briefly trained pilots for the Air Force as the 71st Pilot Training Squadron in the 1970s, but returned to the cruise missile mission with the BGM-109G in 1984.

== History ==
=== World War II ===
==== Initial organization and training ====
The squadron was first activated on 15 January 1941 at Langley Field, Virginia as the 71st Bombardment Squadron, one of the three original bombardment squadrons of the 38th Bombardment Group. The squadron trained with Martin B-26 Marauders, but also flew Douglas B-18 Bolos. In June 1941, the squadron moved to Jackson Army Air Base, Mississippi.

Shortly after the attack on Pearl Harbor, on 19 January 1942, the ground echelon of the squadron departed for Australia. The air echelon remained at Jackson and continued training, converting to North American B-25 Mitchells, until the summer of 1942, when it departed for the Southwest Pacific Theater.

==== Combat in the Pacific ====
The air echelon arrived at its first combat station, Breddan Aerodrome, Queensland, Australia in early August 1942. The squadron attacked Japanese airfields and shipping, and supported ground forces in New Guinea and the Bismarck Archipelago, moving forward through New Guinea and the Netherlands East Indies. In December 1943, the squadron was awarded its first Distinguished Unit Citation (DUC) for bombing and strafing Japanese installations on Cape Gloucester on New Britain in December 1943. It earned a second DUC for missions on 16 and 17 June 1944 for missions attacking Japanese airfields, merchant ships and naval vessels in New Guinea.

The squadron moved to Pitoe Airfield, Morotai in the Maluku Islands. From this base, it bombed airfields, ground installations, harbors and shipping in the southern Philippines to support the invasion of Leyte. It was awarded a third DUC for strikes on a large enemy convoy at Ormoc Bay on 10 November that prevented the landing of supplies and reinforcements, that were critical to the outcome of the Battle of Leyte.

In January 1945, the squadron moved to Lingayen Airfield, on Luzon, Philippines, from which it provided air support for American forces on Luzon, and made attacks on Formosa and enemy shipping along the coast of China. In July 1945, the squadron moved to Okinawa, attacking industrial targets, rail transportation and shipping in southern Japan until V-J Day.

The squadron moved to Itazuke Airfield, Japan in November 1945, when it became part of the occupation forces. There it began conversion to the Douglas A-26 Invader. Its manning and equipment was withdrawn in November 1946, but it was again manned in November 1947. However, President Truman’s reduced 1949 defense budget required reductions in the number of groups in the Air Force to 48, and the squadron was inactivated on 1 April 1949

=== Tactical bomber operations ===
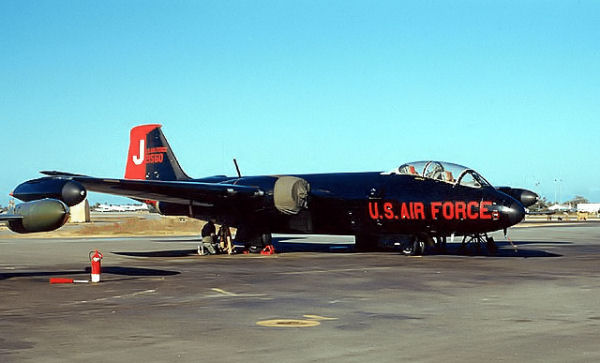
Squadron B-57A Canberra (Note: Aircraft is Martin B-57B-MA, serial 52-1560, taken in 1957. This aircraft was also one of the "Black Knights" aerial acrobatic team.)

The 126th Bombardment Wing, an Illinois Air National Guard unit that had been mobilized for the Korean War and selected to reinforce NATO, moved to Laon-Couvron Air Base, France with its Douglas B-26 Invaders in late May 1952. The installation had not been used as an airfield since 1945, when it was an Advanced Landing Ground for the Army Air Forces. The 71st was reactivated to assume the mission, personnel and B-26 light bombers of the 108th Bombardment Squadron, an Illinois Air National Guard squadron that was being returned to state control at the end of its active duty tour. Over the next two years, the squadron completed an upgrade of its Invader force to planes equipped for night intruder missions. As facilities at Laon were completed, it was able to move from tents to permanent buildings.

In January 1955, the squadron's pilots began flying missions in jet Lockheed T-33 T-Birds to prepare them for conversion to Martin B-57B Canberras. It would not be until the end of the year before the first B-57Cs, equipped with dual controls were on hand, so for some squadron pilots, their first solo in the Canberra was also their first flight in the bomber. In July 1955, the squadron's mission was changed from night intruder missions to the delivery of nuclear weapons.

Starting in January 1956, the squadron, along with the other squadrons of the 38th Wing, began to rotate aircrews and aircraft to Landstuhl Air Base, where they stood alert with nuclear weapons (called Zulu Alert). The squadron also participated in the wing's maintenance of twelve aircraft on alert at its home station. To maintain efficiency in its operational mission, the squadron deployed to Wheelus Air Base, Libya for gunnery and bombing practice. In December 1957, the 38th Bombardment Wing converted to the dual deputy organization. The 38th Bombardment Group was inactivated and the squadron was assigned directly to wing headquarters.

At the start of 1958, the squadron began transferring its B-57s back to the United States. By 18 June, the squadron's operations at Laon had ceased.

=== Matador and Mace missiles ===
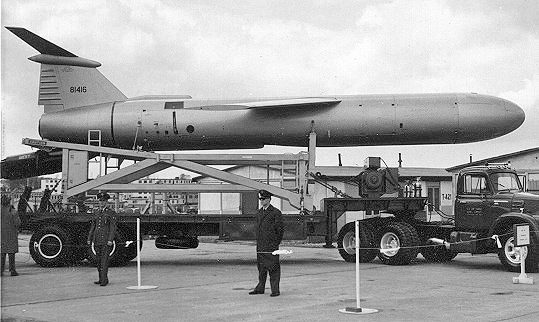
71st Tactical Missile Squadron - TM-76 Mace Missile

The end of the B-57 bomber mission in Europe did not, however, result in the inactivation of the squadron. On 18 June, the 38th Wing moved to Germany, where it replaced the 701st Tactical Missile Wing. The 71st moved on paper to Bitburg Air Base, where it became the 71st Tactical Missile Squadron and assumed the mission, personnel and Martin TM-61 Matador missiles of the 1st Tactical Missile Squadron, which was simultaneously inactivated. The wing's squadrons were dispersed among several bases in Germany, and the squadron was assigned to the missile group at Bitburg, the 585th Tactical Missile Group.

The wing's missiles at Bitburg were located at two remote missile launch sites. The squadron operated Site VII "Chargirl", which was located 3.5 miles (5.6 km) NW of Bitburg, 49°59′05″N 006°28′50″E, near . It also operated Site VIII, which was located 4.5 miles (7.2 km) SSW of Bitburg, 49°53′21″N 006°33′30″E, near.

In September 1962, the 38th Wing reorganized, eliminating its groups. As a result, the squadron was now assigned directly to the 38th Tactical Missile Wing. At the same time, the wing completed its upgrade from Matadors to the TM-76 Mace missile. The Mace was a development of the Matador, with an internal guidance system.

In 1966, the A model of the Mace was retired and the missiles were shipped to Eglin Air Force Base. Florida to be used as targets. However, the 71st was the only squadron of the wing that operated the B model of the Mace with an inertial guidance system and longer range, and it remained active when the rest of the wing was inactivated, transferring to the 36th Tactical Fighter Wing at Bitburg in October 1965. It remained active until the last Maces were withdrawn from Europe in 1969.

=== Pilot training ===
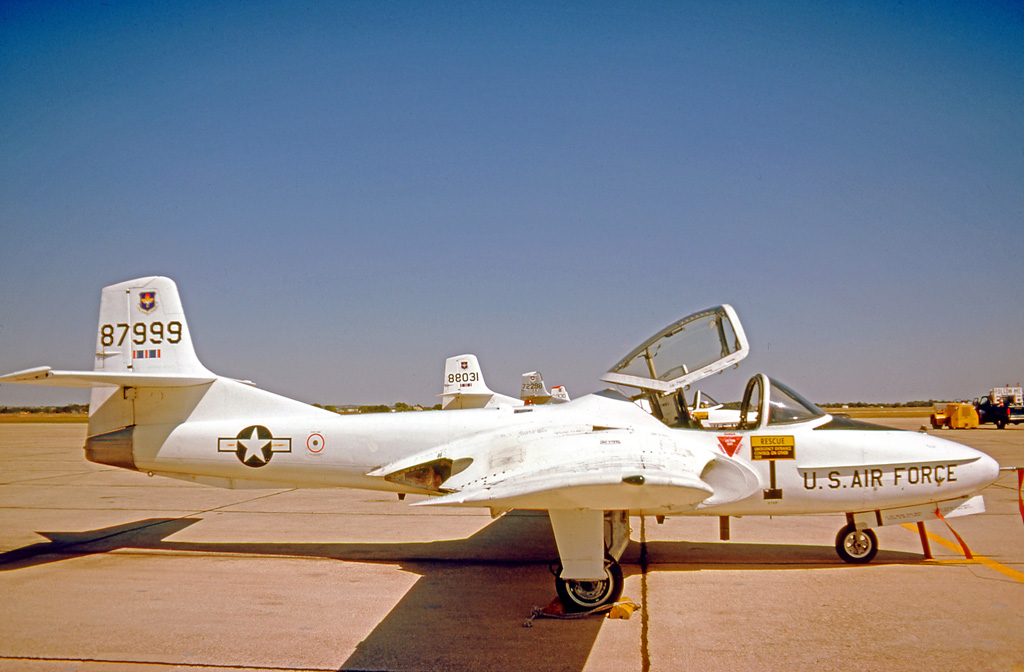
Cessna T-37B as flown by the squadron at Laredo

The squadron was reactivated in August 1972 as the 71st Flying Training Squadron, when the 38th Wing replaced the 3640th Pilot Training Wing at Laredo Air Force Base, Texas. The squadron operated Cessna T-37 Tweets in the primary phase of Undergraduate Pilot Training (UPT). However, with the withdrawal of US forces from Vietnam, pilot training requirements of the Air Force were diminishing, and Laredo was scheduled to close. The squadron was inactivated along with the wing on 30 September 1973 as Laredo closed.

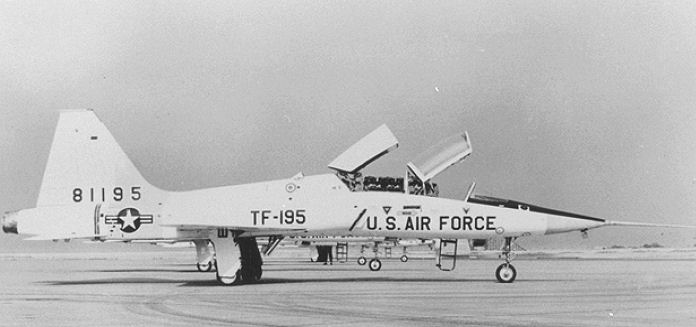
T-38 at Moody AFB

However, the squadron's inactive period was short. It was again activated when the 38th Wing replaced the 3550th Pilot Training Wing at Moody Air Force Base, Georgia on 1 December 1973. At Moody, the squadron provided instruction in the basic phase of UPT with Northrop T-38 Talons. The Air Force's pilot requirements continued to drop, and the squadron ended operations in November 1975. The squadron was inactivated on 1 December 1975 along with the 38th Wing when Moody became a tactical tighter base after the Vietnam War ended.

=== Ground launched cruise missile operations ===
The squadron returned to its missile mission and 71st Tactical Missile Squadron designation as a BGM-109G Gryphon ground launched cruise missile squadron in August 1984, when it was activated at Florennes Air Base, Belgium and assigned to the 485th Tactical Missile Wing. It maintained 80 operational missiles in a combat-ready state. Almost as soon as the Gryphons deployed in Europe, protests erupted against them. The BGM-109G missile was site located at 50°13′34″N 004°39′01″E

By the time the Gryphons were fully deployed in 1987, talks between the United States and the Soviet Union had begun that led to the signing of the Intermediate Range Nuclear Forces Treaty, banning the missiles from Europe, and the squadron inactivated on 30 April 1989.

== Lineage ==
- Constituted as the 71st Bombardment Squadron (Medium) on 20 November 1940

Activated on 15 January 1941
Redesignated 71st Bombardment Squadron, Medium c. 1944
Redesignated 71st Bombardment Squadron, Light on 6 May 1946
Inactivated on 1 April 1949

- Activated on 1 January 1953

Redesignated 71st Bombardment Squadron, Tactical on 1 October 1955
Redesignated 71st Tactical Missile Squadron on 18 June 1958
Inactivated on 30 April 1969

- Redesignated 71st Flying Training Squadron on 22 March 1972

Activated 1 August 1972
Inactivated 30 September 1973

- Activated 1 December 1973

Inactivated 1 December 1975

- Redesignated 71st Tactical Missile Squadron
- Activated on 1 August 1984

Inactivated 30 April 1989

=== Assignments ===
- 38th Bombardment Group, 15 January 1941 – 1 April 1949
- 38th Bombardment Group, 1 January 1953
- 38th Bombardment Wing, 8 December 1957
- 585th Tactical Missile Group, 18 June 1958
- 38th Tactical Missile Wing, 25 September 1962 – 1 October 1965
- 36th Tactical Fighter Wing, 1 October 1965 – 30 April 1969
- 38th Flying Training Wing, 1 August 1972 – 30 September 1973
- 38th Flying Training Wing, 1 December 1973 – 1 December 1975
- 485th Tactical Missile Wing, 1 August 1984 to 30 April 1989

=== Stations ===
- Langley Field, Virginia, 15 January 1941
- Jackson Army Air Base, Mississippi, c. 5 June 1941 – 18 January 1942
- Doomben Field, Queensland, Australia, 25 February 1942
- Ballarat Airport, Victoria, Australia, 8 March 1942
- Batchelor Airfield, Northern Territory, Australia, c. 30 April 1942
- Breddan Aerodrome, Queensland, Australia, 12 August 1942
- RAAF Base Townsville, Queensland, Australia, 1 October 1942
- Durand Airfield, Port Moresby, New Guinea, c.29 October 1942
- Nadzab Airfield Complex, New Guinea, 5 March 1944
- Mokmer Airfield, Biak, Netherlands East Indies, 6 September 1944
- Pitoe Airfield, Morotai, Netherlands East Indies, c. 15 October 1944
- Lingayen Airfield, Luzon, Philippines, c. 1 February 1945
- Motobu Airfield, Okinawa, c. 25 July 1945
- Itazuke Airfield, Japan, c. 22 November 1945
- Itami Airfield, Japan, c. 26 October 1946 – 1 April 1949
- Laon-Couvron Air Base, France, 1 January 1953
- Bitburg Air Base, Germany, 18 June 1958 – 30 April 1969
- Laredo Air Force Base, Texas, 1 August 1972 – 30 September 1973
- Moody Air Force Base, Georgia, 1 December 1973 – 1 December 1975
- Florennes Air Base, Belgium 4 August 1984 – 30 September 1989

=== Aircraft and missiles ===
- Douglas B-18 Bolo, 1941
- Martin B-26 Marauder, 1941–1942
- North American B-25 Mitchel], 1942–1946, 1947–1948
- Douglas A-26 (later B-26) Invader, 1946, 1947–1949, 1953–1955
- Martin B-57 Canberra, 1955–1958
- Martin TM-61 Matador, 1958–1962
- Martin TM-76B (later CGM-13B) Mace, 1962–1969
- Cessna T-37 Tweet, 1972–1975
- Northrop T-38 Talon, 1972–1975
- General Dynamics BGM-109G Gryphon, 1984–1989

=== Awards and campaigns ===
Award streamer	Award	Dates	Notes
	Distinguished Unit Citation	23 July 1942–23 January 1943	Papua New Guinea 71st Bombardment Squadron
	Distinguished Unit Citation	24–26 December 1943	New Britain 71st Bombardment Squadron
	Distinguished Unit Citation	16-17 June 1944	New Guinea 71st Bombardment Squadron
	Distinguished Unit Citation	10 November 1944	Leyte 71st Bombardment Squadron
	Air Force Outstanding Unit Award	1 April 1956–1 March 1958	71st Bombardment Squadron
	Air Force Outstanding Unit Award	1 April 1959–30 January 1961	71st Tactical Missile Squadron
	Air Force Outstanding Unit Award	1 June 1964–30 Sep 1965	71st Tactical Missile Squadron
	Air Force Outstanding Unit Award	1 January 1966–31 December 1967	71st Tactical Missile Squadron
	Air Force Outstanding Unit Award	1 January 1966–31 December 1967	71st Tactical Missile Squadron
	Philippine Republic Presidential Unit Citation	30 January 1945–4 July 1945	71st Bombardment Squadron

Campaign Streamer	Campaign	Dates	Notes
	Air Offensive, Japan	17 April 1942 – 2 September 1945	71st Bombardment Squadron
	East Indies	17 April 1942 – 22 July 1942	71st Bombardment Squadron
	China Defensive	4 July 1942 – 4 May 1945	71st Bombardment Squadron
	Papua	23 July 1942 – 23 January 1943	71st Bombardment Squadron
	New Guinea	24 January 1943 – 31 December 1944	71st Bombardment Squadron
	Northern Solomons	23 February 1943 – 21 November 1944	71st Bombardment Squadron
	Bismarck Archipelago	15 December 1943 – 27 November 1944	71st Bombardment Squadron
	Leyte	17 October 1944 – 1 July 1945	71st Bombardment Squadron
	Luzon	15 December 1944 – 4 July 1945	71st Bombardment Squadron
	Southern Philippines	27 February 1945 – 4 July 1945	71st Bombardment Squadron
	Western Pacific	17 April 1945 – 2 September 1945	71st Bombardment Squadron

== See also ==
- List of United States Air Force missile squadrons
- List of B-57 units of the United States Air Force
- List of A-26 Invader operators
- List of Martin B-26 Marauder operators
- United States Army Air Forces in Australia
