= 525th Fighter Squadron =

525th Fighter Squadron

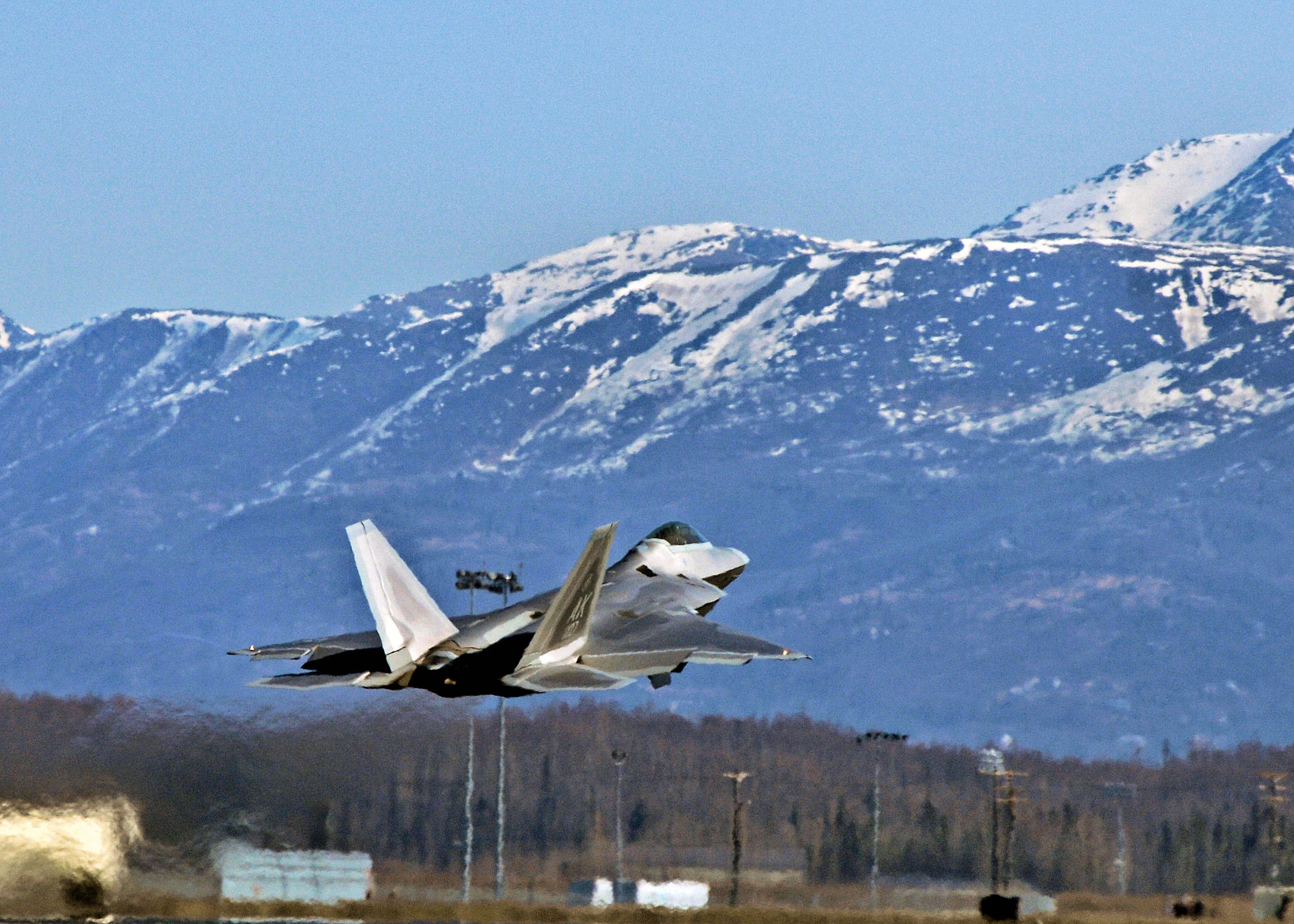
- A squadron F-22A Raptor takes off from Elmendorf AFB
- Active: 1942–1946; 1946–1992; 2007–present
- Country: United States
- Branch: United States Air Force
- Role: Fighter
- Part of: Pacific Air Forces
- Garrison/HQ: Joint Base Elmendorf–Richardson
- Nickname: Bulldogs
- Mascots: Fado, an English bulldog.
- Engagements: Mediterranean Theater of Operations; European Theater of Operations; Gulf War; Global War on Terror
- Decorations: Distinguished Unit Citation; Air Force Outstanding Unit Award

Insignia
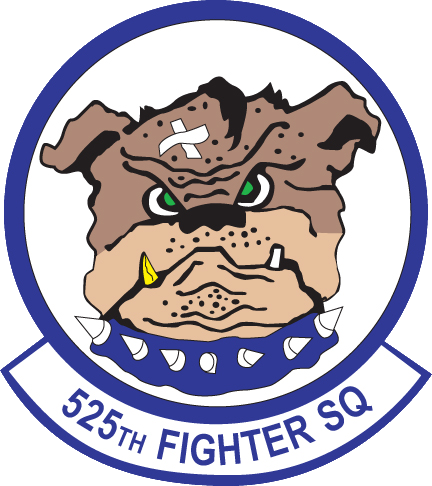
- 525th Fighter Squadron emblem (Note: Approved 29 September 1955. Description: On a disc Argent, a stylized bulldog head affronté Proper, armed Or and of the first [color] (broken), bandaged on forehead in saltire of the field['s color], eyed Vert, collared Azure, spiked White, all within a narrow border Blue. Significance: Ultramarine blue and Air Force yellow are the Air Force colors. Blue alludes to the sky, the primary theater of Air Force operations. Yellow refers to the sun and the excellence required of Air Force personnel. The bulldog represents the true fighter. The dog’s expression, with broken tooth, patch on head and spiked collar, represents an experienced hardened fighter without specifically showing aircraft, wings, flames, jets or armament, giving the emblem long-range suitability to a tactical fighter outfit. The bulldog’s overall appearance has maintained a link to the squadron’s original bulldog patch)

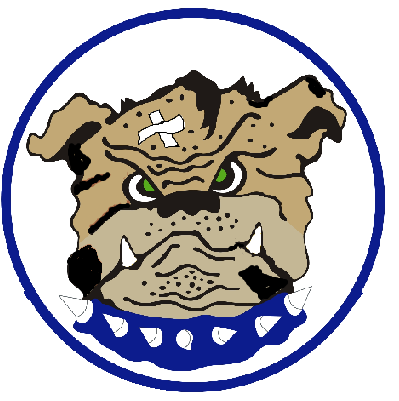
- 525th Fighter-Interceptor Squadron emblem (Note: Approved 29 September 1955. Description: On a white disc, edged light blue, the full face of a caricatured bulldog, in shades of light brown and tan, detail and outlines black, eyeballs, teeth and patch on his forehead white, iris black, pupils green, wearing a collar of the second [color], spiked white.)

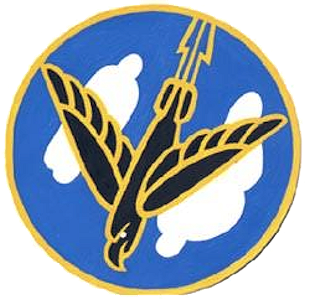
- 309th Bombardment Squadron emblem

The 525th Fighter Squadron is a United States Air Force unit. It is assigned to the 3rd Operations Group at Joint Base Elmendorf–Richardson, Alaska. The squadron was first activated as the 309th Bombardment Squadron in February 1942. After training in the United States, it was deployed to the Mediterranean Theater of Operations, where it became the 525th Fighter-Bomber Squadron and engaged in combat until the spring of 1945, earning two Distinguished Unit Citations. After VE Day, the squadron became part of the occupation forces in Germany. Briefly inactivated in 1946, it returned to Germany a few months later.

During the Cold War, the squadron served in the fighter bomber role as the 525th Fighter-Bomber Squadron and in the air defense role as the 525th Fighter-Interceptor Squadron. It became the 525th Tactical Fighter Squadron in 1969. The squadron again saw combat service in the Gulf War before inactivating in March 1992.

The squadron was reactivated in its current location in September 2007.

== Mission ==
The squadron prepares for rapid worldwide deployment of Lockheed Martin F-22A Raptor aircraft to engage surface targets using a wide variety of conventional air-to-surface munitions. It trains in the fighter missions of strategic attack, interdiction, Suppression of Enemy Air Defenses, as well as offensive and defensive counterair.

== History ==
=== World War II ===
The squadron originally activated on 10 February 1942 at Will Rogers Field, Oklahoma as the 309th Bombardment Squadron (Light), one of the four squadrons of the 86th Bombardment Group. In August 1942, it moved to Key Field, Mississippi, where it began training with the Douglas A-20 Havoc. In August, the squadron became a dive bomber unit. Before the end of 1942, the squadron transitioned briefly to Vultee A-31 Vengeance and then to North American A-36 Apache dive bombers. The squadron became combat ready on 19 March 1943.

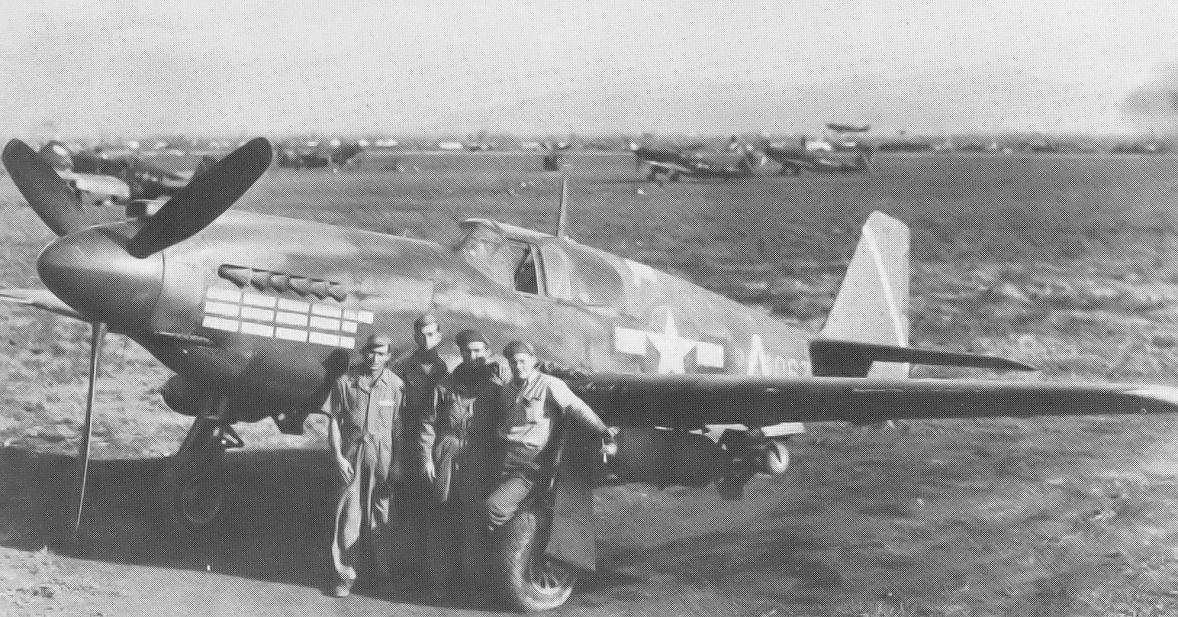
86th Group A-36 in north Africa

The squadron boarded the SS John Ericsson in April 1943. Twelve days later, the squadron landed at La Senia Airfield, Algeria. The 309th moved to Mediouna Airfield, French Morocco in May 1943, to Marnia Airfield, French Morocco on 3 June 1943, and Tafaraoui Airfield, Algeria on 11 June 1943. The squadron trained until it entered combat on 6 July 1943, striking enemy entrenchments in Sicily, softening enemy resistance for General George S. Patton's Seventh Army. Following Operation Husky, the invasion of Sicily, the 309th Squadron moved to Gela Airfield, Sicily on 20 July 1943, and to Barcellona Landing Ground, Sicily, on 27 July 1943, to support Allied operations against the west coast of Italy. The squadron engaged primarily in close air support, moving forward as the battle line on the ground changed.

The squadron also flew patrols and interdiction missions, attacking convoys, trains, troop columns, bridges and rail lines, and supply dumps and columns. It was redesignated the 525th Fighter-Bomber Squadron on 23 August 1943. While in Italy, the 525th moved several more times while participating in the Rome-Arno campaign. The 525th provided air support to Allied ground forces in Operation Avalanche, the invasion of Italy near Salerno, and the Battle of Monte Cassino during the advance on Rome in the first six months of 1944.

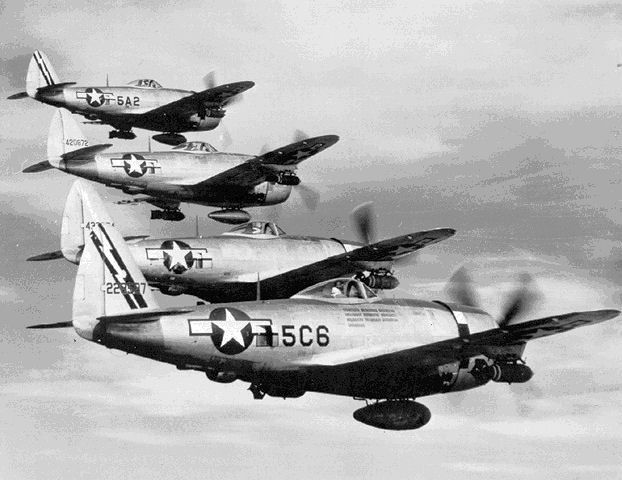
86th Group P-47 Thunderbolts

In 1944, the 525th transitioned to the Republic P-47 Thunderbolt and was redesignated the 525th Fighter Squadron on 30 May 1944. On 25 May, the squadron repeatedly dived through intense flak to destroy enemy vehicles and troop positions when the Wehrmacht tried to stop the advance of Allied forces short of Rome. This action earned the squadron its first Distinguished Unit Citation (DUC). In August 1944, the squadron provided support for Operation Dragoon, the invasion of southern France. Until the spring of 1945, the squadron concentrated on Operation Strangle, the effort to choke off supplies for Axis military in northern Italy through air interdiction.

In February 1945, the squadron moved to Tatonville Airfield, France, to fly missions against Germany. Two months later it moved to Braunshardt Airfield, Germany on 18 April 1945. On 20 April, it attacked airfields and convoys in northern Germany, disorganizing enemy efforts to withdraw from the area. For this action, the squadron received a second DUC. The squadron flew its last combat mission on 8 May 1945, and postwar, the headquarters moved to AAF Station Schweinfurt on 23 October 1945. Although the squadron was prmarily engaged in ground attack missions during the war, it received credit for the destruction of three enemy aircraft. The squadron became part of the American occupation forces until February 1946, when it moved on paper to Bolling Field, District of Columbia, where it was inactivated on 31 March 1946.

=== Cold War ===
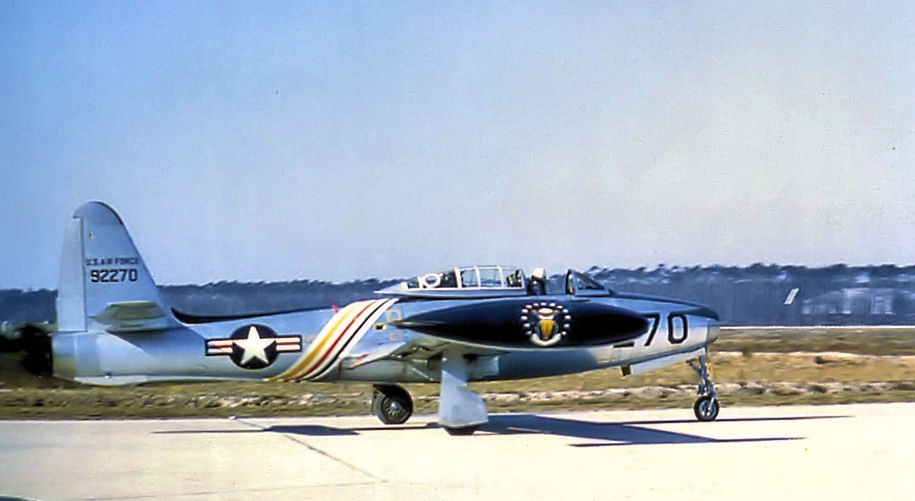
Squadron F-84E (Note: Aircraft is Republic F-84E-10-RE Thunderjet, serial 49-2270.)

The squadron was reactivated in the occupation forces on 20 August 1946, at AAF Station Nordholz, Germany, where it took over the personnel and P-47 Thunderbolts of the 512th Fighter Squadron, which was simultaneously inactivated. The squadron made two moves in Germany that year before settling at Neubiberg Air Force Base on 12 June 1947, where the squadron was the closest operational Air Force unit to the Iron Curtain. On 20 January 1950, the squadron was redesignated the 525th Fighter-Bomber Squadron. In October 1950, the squadron transitioned to its first jet aircraft, the Republic F-84E Thunderjet. In addition to its other duties, the 525th trained pilots and ground crews of European and Middle Eastern countries receiving F-84s under the Mutual Defense Assistance Program.

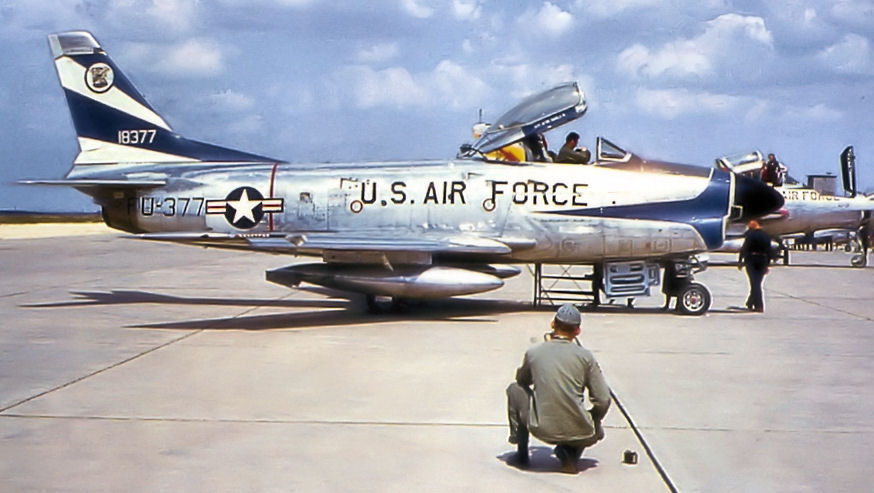
Squadron F-86D Sabre (Note: Aircraft is North American F-86D-35-NA Sabre, serial 51-8377.)

The 525th moved to Landstuhl Air Base, Germany on 20 November 1952, where it transitioned to the North American F-86 Sabre. The 525th first flew the F-86F Sabre fighter-bomber in April 1953. The following year, the squadron transitioned to the F-86D, equipped with airborne intercept radar and armed with Folding-Fin Aerial Rockets. The F-86D was Europe's first all-weather fighter-interceptor. Flying the F-86D in the air defense role, the 525th was redesignated the 525th Fighter-Interceptor Squadron on 9 August 1954.

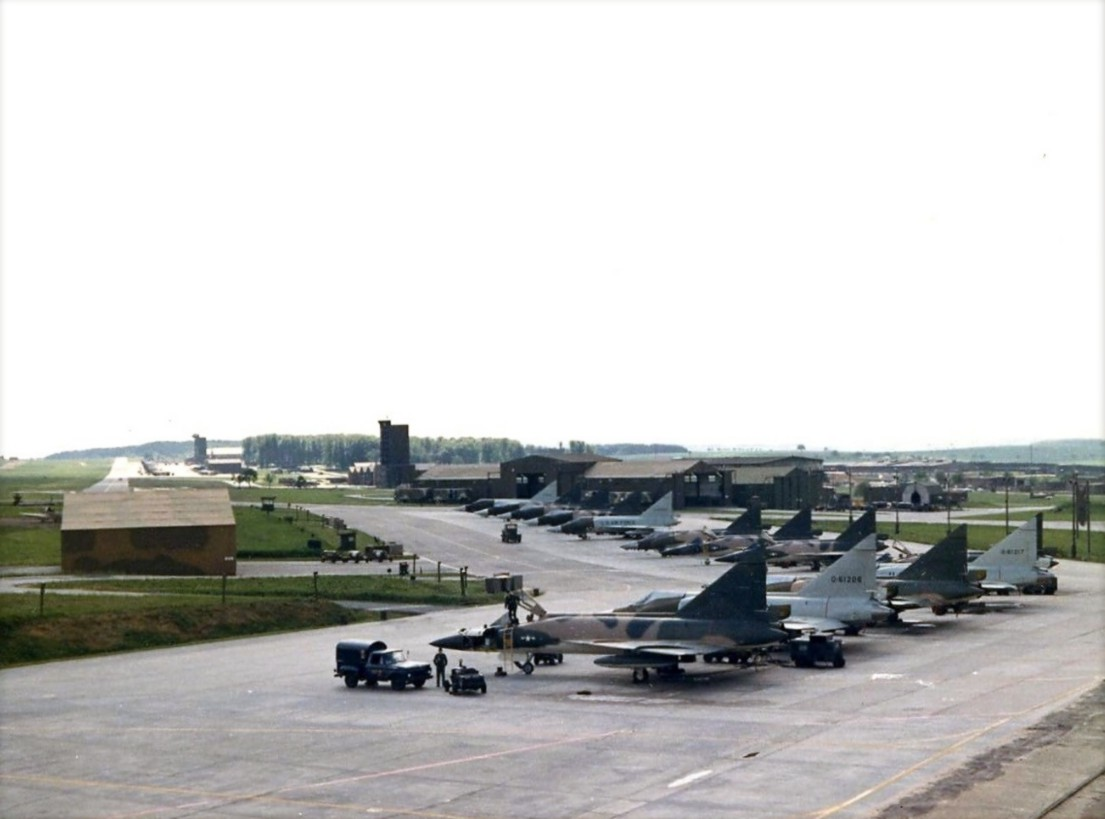
Squadron F-102As at Bitburg AB in 1967

In 1957, the 86th Group dispersed its squadrons throughout Europe to provide better air defense coverage and reduce their vulnerability to attack. On 12 February, the squadron moved to Bitburg Air Base, Germany. The 525th maintained air defense alert at Bitburg for the next 20 years. It received its first Convair F-102 Delta Daggers in February 1959. The F-102 was equipped with data link for inerception control as the 86th Air Division was upgrading from a manual to a semi-automatic air defense network.

The squadron was selected to represent the United States Air Forces in Europe (USAFE) at the 1959 William Tell competition. Although new to its aircraft, the 525th took the lead in the competition and held it until the last event when it was nosed out by a few points. In 1965, 1967 and 1971 the squadron was chosen as the Sector III representative to the NATO Air Superiority Competition.

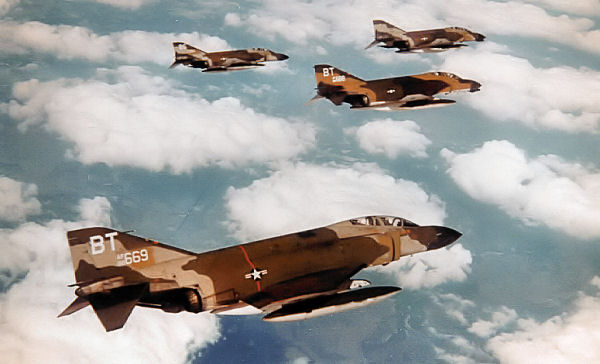
F-4Es from Bitburg AB in 1972

On 1 October 1969, the squadron was renamed the 525th Tactical Fighter Squadron and became part of the 36th Tactical Fighter Wing on 1 November. Although it still maintained two aircraft on 24-hour air defense alert status, the squadron's mission now included close air support and limited nuclear delivery as began to convert to the McDonnell Douglas F-4 Phantom II. It became the first squadron in Germany to fly the F-4E model of the Phantom, equipped with an internal gun. The 525th was nominated by USAFE for the Hughes Trophy in 1969. In 1974, USAFE again nominated the 525th for the Hughes Trophy. It had won other awards in 1970 and 1971, earning the Allied Forces Central Europe Scroll of Honor those years based on tactical evaluations of the squadron by Allied Air Forces Central Europe. In 1971, the squadron won the Guynemer Trophy (Note: The Guynemer Trophy was awarded to the winner of a NATO competition for best gunnery. Multiple. "Guynemer Trophy". Royal Air Force Forums.) for the best sector performance in 1971.

The squadron began Dissimilar Air Combat Tactics (DACT) training with the Northrop F-5 Tiger II equipped 527th Aggressor Squadron at RAF Alconbury, England. Later, the squadron was the first in USAFE to establish DACT programs with non-aggressor and non-USAF adversaries.

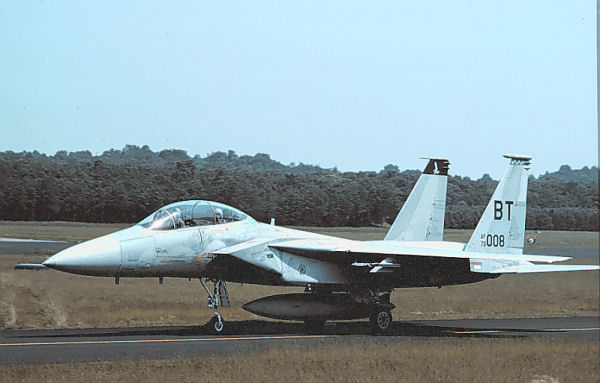
525th Squadron F-15D Eagle (Note: Aircraft is McDonnell Douglas F-15D-25-MC Eagle, serial 79-0008. This airplane was sold to the Israeli Air Force in September 2016. Dirkx, Marco (24 April 2024). "1979 USAF Serial Numbers". Joe Baugher’s Serial Number List.)

The 525th was the first squadron to fly the McDonnell Douglas F-15 Eagle. Squadron pilots flew the first F-15 Eagles to Europe on 27 April 1977 in a non-stop deployment from Langley Air Force Base, Virginia to Bitburg. Eighteen hours after arrival at Bitburg, squadron pilots were standing five-minute alert status with two of the F-15s. After less than one month, the Bulldogs were declared Europe's first operationally ready F-15 squadron.

In October 1979, the 525th flew the first training missions at the new air combat maneuvering instrumentation range at Decimomannu Air Base, Sardinia, Italy. In 1984, the squadron participated in an exchange with the French Air Force, sending six F-15s to Orange-Caritat Air Base, France, while four Dassault Mirage F-1 aircraft flew for several weeks from Bitburg. In 1986, and again in 1987, the 525th deployed to Sidi Slimane Air Base, Morocco where it operated from tents and flew missions with Moroccan Mirage F-1 and F-5 fighters. In November 1988, the 525th won USAFE's Excalibur air-to-air weapons competition.

=== Gulf War ===
After the August 1990 Iraqi invarion of Kuwait, the 525th deployed to Incirlik Air Base, Turkey in December 1990. On 17 January 1991, the squadron was joined with other combat aircraft from units around the world to form the 7440th Composite Wing (Provisional). On the night of 17 January 1991, the squadron flew its first strike against Iraq. On 19 January 1991, two 525th pilots used AIM-7 Sparrow radar missiles to destroy two Iraqi Mirage F-1s. During the next six weeks, the 525th flew around the clock, targeting military airfields, nuclear and chemical facilities, communications centers, power plants, and oil refineries and storage facilities in northern Iraq. By the middle of February, the 525th was attacking Baghdad. In addition to protecting strike aircraft, the 525th was tasked to fly combat air patrols in eastern Iraq to destroy Iraqi fighters attempting to flee to Iran. The squadron shot down six enemy aircraft without losing any of its own aircraft. On 13 March 1991, the 525th returned to Bitburg.

Following the war against Iraq, numerous Kurdish refugees fled northward from the remaining forces of Saddam Hussein. The United States initiated Operation Provide Comfort, to drop food and supplies to these refugees. Because tensions between the Iraqi and Allied forces in the area remained high, the squadron deployed back to Incirlik on 5 April 1991 to protect Allied cargo aircraft. In addition, the squadron was tasked to fly at low altitude over Iraq and provide intelligence updates of Iraqi troop and equipment locations. Between 5 April and 25 May 1991, the 525th flew 285 sorties over Iraq in support of Operation Provide Comfort without a single Allied aircraft being lost in Iraq due to hostile fire. Following this deployment, the squadron inactivated on 1 April 1992.

=== Reactivation in Alaska ===
The squadron activated at Elmendorf Air Force Base, Alaska on 29 October 2007 and was equipped with the Lockheed Martin F-22 Raptor. In November 2022, the squadron deployed to Kadena Air Base, Okinawa as Pacific Air Forces brought more advanced fighter aircraft forward to the western Pacific while the 18th Wing began transferring its F-15C Eagles back to the United States.

== Lineage ==
- Constituted as the 309th Bombardment Squadron (Light) on 13 January 1942

Activated on 10 February 1942
Redesignated 309th Bombardment Squadron (Dive) on 3 September 1942
Redesignated 525th Fighter-Bomber Squadron on 23 August 1943
Redesignated 525th Fighter Squadron on 30 May 1944
Inactivated on 31 March 1946

- Activated on 20 August 1946

Redesignated 525th Fighter-Bomber Squadron on 20 January 1950
Redesignated 525th Fighter-Interceptor Squadron on 9 August 1954
Redesignated 525th Tactical Fighter Squadron on 1 October 1969
Inactivated on 31 March 1992

- Redesignated 525th Fighter Squadron on 18 September 2007

Activated on 30 September 2007

=== Assignments ===
- 86th Bombardment Group (later 86th Fighter-Bomber Group, 86th Fighter Group), 10 February 1942 – 31 March 1946
- 86th Fighter Group (later 86th Composite Group, 86th Fighter Group, 86th Fighter-Bomber Group, 86th Fighter-Interceptor Group), 20 August 1946 (attached to 86th Fighter-Interceptor Wing, 22 May 1954 – 7 October 1955 and after 10 August 1956)
- 86th Fighter-Interceptor Wing (later 86th Air Division), 8 March 1958
- 36th Tactical Fighter Wing (later 36th Fighter Wing), 1 November 1968 – 31 March 1992
- 3d Operations Group, 30 September 2007 – present

=== Stations ===
- Will Rogers Field, Oklahoma, 10 February 1942
- Hunter Field, Georgia, 15 June 1942
- Key Field, Mississippi, c. 7 August 1942 – 19 March 1943
- La Senia Airfield, Algeria, 12 May 1943
- Mediouna Airfield, French Morocco, 15 May 1943
- Marnia Airfield, French Morocco, 3 June 1943
- Tafaraoui Airfield, Algeria, 11 June 1943
- Gela Airfield, Sicily, Italy, 20 July 1943
- Barcellona Landing Ground, Sicily, Italy, 27 July 1943
- Sele Airfield, Italy, 23 September 1943
- Serretella Airfield, Italy, 14 October 1943
- Pomigliano Airfield, Italy, 19 November 1943
- Marcianise Airfield, Italy, 30 April 1944
- Ciampino Airport, Italy, c. 11 June 1944
- Orbetello Airfield, Italy, c. 18 June 1944
- Poretta Airfield, Corsica, France, c. 12 July 1944
- Grosseto Airfield, Italy, c. 18 September 1944
- Pisa Airport, Italy, c. 1 November 1944
- Tantonville Airfield (Y-1), France, c. 23 February 1945
- Braunshardt Airfield (Y-72), Germany, 18 April 1945
- AAF Station Schweinfurt(R-25), Germany, c. 23 October 1945 – 15 February 1946
- Bolling Field, Washington, D.C., 15 February – 31 March 1946
- AAF Station Nordholz, Germany, 20 August 1946
- AAF Station Lechfeld, Germany c. 13 November 1946
- AAF Station Bad Kissingen, Germany, 5 March 1947
- AAF Station Neubiberg (later Neubiberg Air Force Base, Neubiberg Air Base), Germany, 12 June 1947
- Landstuhl Air Base (later Ramstein-Landstuhl Air Base, Ramstein Air Base), Germany, 20 November 1952
- Bitburg Air Base, Germany, 12 February 1957 – 31 March 1992
- Elmendorf Air Force Base (later Joint Base Elemdorf-Richardson), Alaska, 30 September 2007 – present

=== Aircraft ===
- Douglas A-20 Havoc, 1942
- Vultee A-31 Vengeance, 1942
- North American A-36 Apache, 1942–1944
- Curtiss P-40 Warhawk, 1944
- Republic P-47 Thunderbolt, 1944–1946; 1946–1950
- Republic F-84 Thunderjet, 1950–1953
- North American F-86 Sabre, 1953–1959
- Convair F-102 Delta Dagger, 1959–1969
- McDonnell Douglas F-4 Phantom II, 1969–1977
- McDonnell Douglas F-15 Eagle, 1977–1991
- Lockheed Martin F-22 Raptor 2007 – present

=== Awards and Campaigns ===
Award streamer	Award	Dates	Notes
	Distinguished Unit Citation	25 May 1944	Italy, 525th Fighter-Bomber Squadron
	Distinguished Unit Citation	20 Apr 1945	Germany, 525th Fighter Squadron
	Air Force Outstanding Unit Award	31 October 1955-31 October 1958	525th Fighter-Interceptor Squadron
	Air Force Outstanding Unit Award	1 January 1962-31 December 1963	525th Fighter-Interceptor Squadron
	Air Force Outstanding Unit Award	1 July 1964-30 June 1965	525th Fighter-Interceptor Squadron
	Air Force Outstanding Unit Award	1 November-31 Dec 1968	525th Fighter-Interceptor Squadron
	Air Force Outstanding Unit Award	1 December 1973-30 April 1975	525th Tactical Fighter Squadron
	Air Force Outstanding Unit Award	1 July 1975-30 June 1977	525th Tactical Fighter Squadron
	Air Force Outstanding Unit Award	1 July 1977-30 June 1979	525th Tactical Fighter Squadron
	Air Force Outstanding Unit Award	1 July 1986-30 June 1988	525th Tactical Fighter Squadron
	Air Force Outstanding Unit Award	1 July 1988-30 June 1990	525th Tactical Fighter Squadron
	Air Force Outstanding Unit Award	1 September 1990-31 July 1991	525th Tactical Fighter Squadron
	Air Force Outstanding Unit Award	7 October 2007-1 November 2008	525th Fighter Squadron
	Air Force Outstanding Unit Award	7 October 2007-1 November 2008	525th Fighter Squadron
	Air Force Outstanding Unit Award	2 November 2008-1 November 2009	525th Fighter Squadron
	Air Force Outstanding Unit Award	1 November 2012-31 October 2014	525th Fighter Squadron

Campaign Streamer	Campaign	Dates	Notes
	American Theater without inscription	10 February 1942–19 March 1943	309th Bombardment Squadron
	Air Combat, EAME Theater	12 May 1943–11 May 1945	309th Bombardment Squadron (later 525th Fighter-Bomber Squadron, 525th Fighter Squadron)
	Sicily	14 May 1943–17 August 1943	309th Bombardment Squadron
	Naples-Foggia	18 August 1943–21 January 1944	309th Bombardment Squadron (later 525th Fighter-Bomber Squadron
	Anzio	22 January 1944–24 May 1944	525th Fighter-Bomber Squadron
	Rome-Arno	22 January 1944–9 September 1944	525th Fighter-Bomber Squadron (later 525th Fighter Squadron)
	Southern France	15 August 1944–14 September 1944	525th Fighter Squadron
	North Apennines	10 September 1944–4 April 1945	525th Fighter Squadron
	Rhineland	15 September 1944–21 March 1945	525th Fighter Squadron
	Central Europe	22 March 1944–21 May 1945	525th Fighter Squadron
	World War II Army of Occupation (Germany)	9 May 1945–15 February 1946, 20 August 1946–5 May 1955	525th Fighter Squadron (later 525th Fighter-Bomber Squadron, 525th Fighter-Interceptor Squadron)
	Defense of Saudi Arabia	December 1990–16 January 1991	525th Tactical Fighter Squadron)
	Liberation and Defense of Kuwait	17 January 1991–11 April 1991	525th Tactical Fighter Squadron)
	Global War on Terror Expeditionary Medal		525th Fighter Squadron)

== See also ==
- List of Douglas A-20 Havoc operators
- List of F-86 Sabre units
- List of F-4 Phantom II operators
- List of McDonnell Douglas F-15 Eagle operators
- List of United States Air Force fighter squadrons
