= Roy Hord Jr. =

American football player (1934–2002)

No. 64, 63
- Position: Guard

Personal information
- Born: December 25, 1934; Charlotte, North Carolina, U.S.
- Died: October 24, 2002 (aged 67); Riverside, California, U.S.
- Listed height: 6 ft 4 in (1.93 m)
- Listed weight: 244 lb (111 kg)

Career information
- High school: Harry P. Harding (Charlotte)
- College: Duke
- NFL draft: 1957: 8th round, 88th overall pick

Career history
- Los Angeles Rams (1960–1962); Philadelphia Eagles (1962); New York Jets (1963)

Awards and highlights
- Second-team All-American (1957); First-team All-ACC (1957)

Career NFL/AFL statistics
- Games played: 53
- Games started: 26
- Fumble recoveries: 2
- Stats at Pro Football Reference

Ambrose Roy Hord Jr. (December 25, 1934 – October 24, 2002) was an American professional football player who was an offensive lineman in the National Football League (NFL) and the American Football League (AFL). He played college football for the Duke Blue Devils.

== Early life ==
Hord was born in Charlotte, North Carolina, and attended the local Harry P. Harding High School. He played college football at Duke University where he was a defensive end and an offensive guard. He was named first-team All-American in 1957 and was inducted into Duke's Hall of Fame in 2005.

== Professional career ==
Hord was an eighth round selection (88th overall pick) of the 1957 NFL draft by the Los Angeles Rams. Before he joins the Rams, Hord served for two years (1958–1959) in the United States Army, training at Bitburg Air Force Base in Germany. He joined the Rams in 1960 and played with them through the beginning of the 1962 season when he was traded to the Philadelphia Eagles. He then joined the AFL's New York Jets in 1963 where he finished his football career in 1965.

== After football ==
After his NFL career ended in 1965, he became general manager of Riverside International Raceway which he worked alongside former Rams player Les Richter. The raceway closed 6 years after he left in 1983, when he became a legislative aide to Riverside County Supervisor Norton Younglove. Hord also served as a legislative aide to Riverside County Supervisor Tom Mullen until the December before his death.
