= Andrea Lawrence =

Andrea Lawrence may refer to:

- Andrea Lawrence (professor) (born 1946), American computer scientist and professor
- Andrea Mead Lawrence (1932–2009), American skier
- Andria Lawrence (born 1936), English actress and writer (a.k.a. Andrea Lawrence)

== See also ==
- Mount Andrea Lawrence
