= Delois Huntley =

African American civil rights pioneer (1945–2015)

- Born: June 2, 1945; Charlotte, North Carolina, U.S.
- Died: May 10, 2015 (aged 69)
- Education: North Carolina Central University; Johnson C. Smith University
- Occupation: activist

Delois Huntley (June 2, 1945 – May 10, 2015) was an American civil rights pioneer and one of four black students to integrate Charlotte schools, by enrolling in the all-White Alexander Graham Junior High. Her first day experiences were less eventful than a few of the other desegregation pioneers such as Dorothy Counts. However she had negative experiences throughout her time in Alexander Graham Junior High.

== Biography ==
Huntley was born in Charlotte, North Carolina, and grew up in the predominantly Black neighborhood Second Ward, also called Brooklyn, which was just three blocks from Alexander Graham Junior High. In 1956, forty Black students from North Carolina applied to transfer to a white school was after the passing of the Pearsall Plan. This happened after the Brown v. Board of Education Supreme Court decision that ruled segregated schools unconstitutional. The NAACP sought out black families willing to send their children to white classrooms.

Huntly was only twelve-years-old when she enrolled in Alexander Graham Junior High. She was encouraged by her parents to enroll. She later told the Charlotte Observer that her parents realized it was for the greater good, "Somebody had to go first."

Throughout her time in Alexander Graham, Huntley would be bumped in the hallways or spat on. At one point during a boy wiped the sweat from his brow onto her face, and some students would whisper disturbing things to Huntley. She told the Charlotte Observer that she remembered her father fielding threatening phone calls, staying up all throughout the night to keep watch, and going to work barely getting sleep.

After her seventh-grade term ended, Huntley was no longer a student for Alexander Graham. The building was torn down in 1958, and the school moved to Myers Park. Huntley went to the all-Black Second Ward High. After graduating, she then studied at North Carolina Central University, and eventually transferred to Johnson C. Smith University.

In 2008, Huntley, along with seven other people, were honored for helping integrate North Carolina's public schools by receiving the Old North State Award from Governor Mike Easley.

She died on May 10, 2015. Her funeral was held at St. Paul Baptist Church in east Charlotte.
