= Dorothy Counts =

American civil rights activist

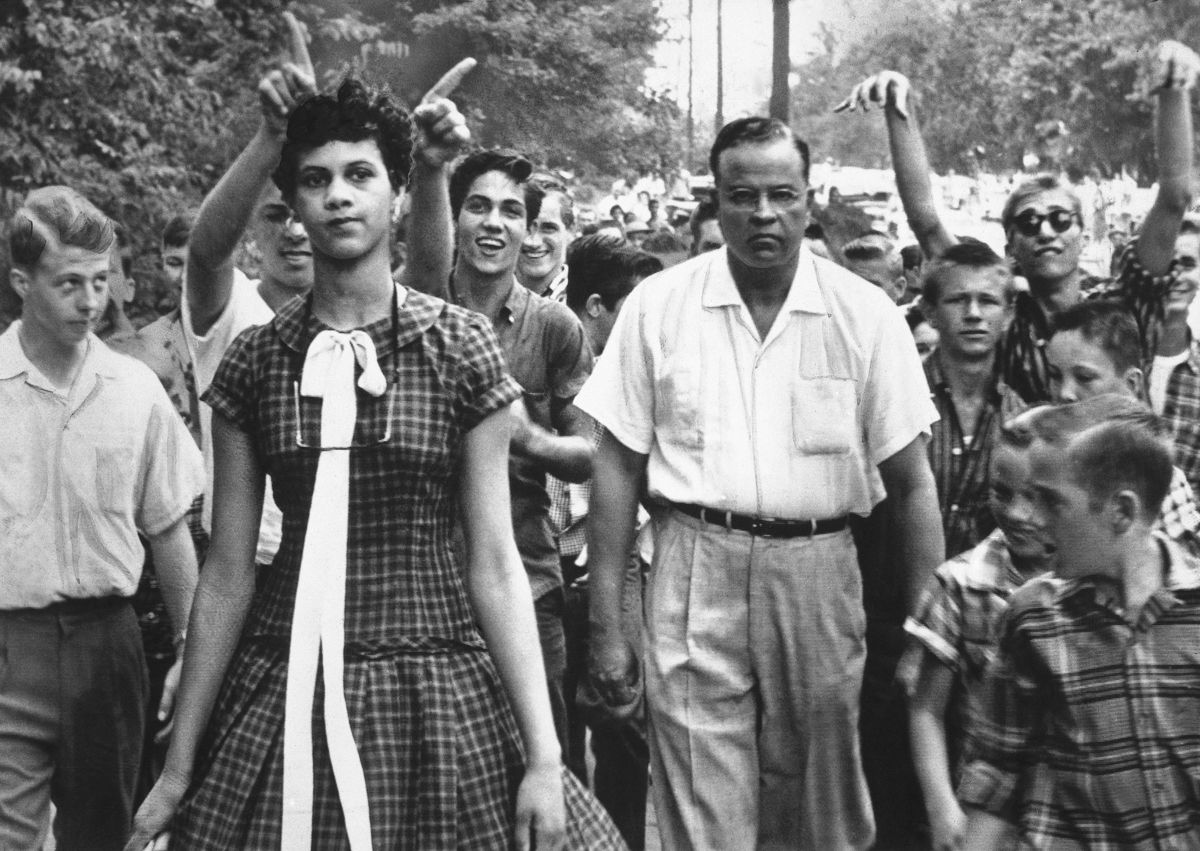
- Counts walks to school on her first day, amid jeers from other students. (Photo by Douglas Martin, winner of 1957 World Press Photo of the Year)
- Born: March 25, 1942 (age 84); Charlotte, North Carolina, U.S.
- Education: Harry P. Harding High School; Allen School; Johnson C. Smith University
- Occupation: Activist

Dorothy "Dot" Counts-Scoggins (born March 25, 1942) is an American civil rights pioneer who was one of the first black students admitted to Harry P. Harding High School during school integration in the United States. After four days of harassment that threatened her safety, her parents withdrew her from the school, but the images of Counts-Scoggins being verbally assaulted by her white classmates were seen around the world.

== Early life ==
Counts-Scoggins was born in Charlotte, North Carolina, and grew up near Johnson C. Smith University where both her parents worked. She was one of four children born to Herman L. Counts Sr. and Olethea Counts and was the couple's only daughter. Her father was a professor of philosophy and religion at the university and her mother was a homemaker and eventually became a dormitory director for the university.

== Harry P. Harding High School ==
In 1956, forty Black students from North Carolina applied for transfers to a white school after the passing of the Pearsall Plan. The family applied for Counts-Scoggins and two of her brothers to enroll in an all-white school after her father was approached by Kelly Alexander Sr. Of her family, only Counts-Scoggins was accepted.

When she was 15, on September 4, 1957, a Thursday, Counts-Scoggins was one of four black students enrolled at various all-white schools in the district; she was enrolled at Harry P. Harding High School in Charlotte, North Carolina. The three other students—Gus Roberts, his sister Girvaud Roberts and Delois Huntley—attended schools including Central High School, Piedmont Junior High School and Alexander Graham Junior High.

Counts-Scoggins was dropped off on her first day of school by her father, along with their family friend Edwin Thompkins. As their car was blocked from going closer to the front entrance, Edwin offered to escort Counts-Scoggins to the front of the school while her father parked the car. As she got out of the car to head down the hill, her father told her, "Hold your head high. You are inferior to no one."

There were roughly 200 to 300 people in the crowd, mostly students. The harassment started when Emma Marie Taylor Warlick, the wife of John Z. Warlick, an officer of the White Citizens Council, urged the boys to "keep her out" and at the same time implored the girls to spit on her, saying: "Spit on her, girls, spit on her." Counts-Scoggins walked by without reacting, but told the press later that many people threw rocks at her—most of which landed in front of her feet—and that students formed walls but parted ways at the last instant to allow her to walk past. Photographer Douglas Martin won the 1957 World Press Photo of the Year with an image of Counts being mocked by a crowd on her first day of school.

After entering the building, she went into the auditorium to sit with her class. She was met with the same harassment that occurred outside the school building, constantly hearing racial slurs shouted to her. She said that no adults assisted or protected her during this time. She mentioned after going to her homeroom to receive her books and schedule she was ignored. After the school day around noon, her parents asked if she wanted to continue going to Harry P. Harding High School, and Counts-Scoggins said that she wanted to go back because she hoped after the students got to know her her time there would improve.

Counts-Scoggins fell ill the following day. With a fever and aching throat, she stayed home from school that Friday, but returned on Monday. After returning to school, there was no crowd present outside the school. However, students and faculty were shocked at her return and proceeded to harass the fifteen-year-old girl. While in class she was placed at the back of the classroom, and was ignored by her teacher. On Tuesday, during lunch, a group of boys circled her and spat in her food. She proceeded to go outside and met another new student who was part of her homeroom class. She talked to Counts-Scoggins about being new to Charlotte and the school. When Counts-Scoggins returned home, she told her parents that she felt better that she made a friend, and had someone to talk to. After her experience during her lunch period, Counts-Scoggins encouraged her parents to pick her up during her lunch period so that she could eat.

On Wednesday, Counts-Scoggins saw the same young girl in the hallway, who proceeded to ignore Counts-Scoggins and hung her head. During her lunch period that day, a blackboard eraser was thrown at Counts-Scoggins and landed on the back of her head. As she proceeded to met her oldest brother for lunch outside, she saw a crowd surrounding the family car, and the back windows were shattered. Counts-Scoggins says this was the first time she was afraid, because now her family was being attacked.

Counts-Scoggins told her family what occurred and her father called the superintendent and the police department to share with them what had happened. The superintendent told the family he was not aware of what was happening at Harry P. Harding High School, and the police chief said that they could not guarantee Counts-Scoggins' protection. After having this conversation, her father decided to take her out of the high school. He said in a statement:

"It is with compassion for our native land and love for our daughter Dorothy that we withdraw her as a student at Harding High School. As long as we felt she could be protected from bodily injury and insults within the school's walls and upon the school premises, we were willing to grant her desire to study at Harding."

== After Harry P. Harding High School ==
Due to her experience at Harry P. Harding High School, her parents wanted her to go to an integrated school, as they did not want her to assume all-white people were the same. She was sent to live with her aunt and uncle in Yeadon, Pennsylvania, to finish her sophomore year, where she attended an integrated public school. Her aunt and uncle went to the school to talk to the principal about their niece's experiences and why she would be attending their high school. There was a meeting held at the high school with students and teachers to assure that Counts-Scoggins would be treated like everyone else in the school. She would find this out later and was not aware of this meeting. Her time at Yeadon was pleasant, but she felt homesick, so after her sophomore year, she went to Allen School, a private all-girls school in Asheville, North Carolina. The private school's student body was not integrated but the faculty was. Counts-Scoggins graduated from Allen School and returned to Charlotte to attend Johnson C. Smith University, where she earned her degree in Psychology in 1964. In 1962, she pledged Delta Sigma Theta sorority.

After graduating from college, Counts-Scoggins moved to New York, where she worked with abused and neglected children. She later moved back to Charlotte where she undertook non-profit work with children from low-income families. She remains active with her alma mater and is an advocate for the preservation of the history of Beatties Ford Road.

== Recognition ==
In 2006, Counts-Scoggins received an email from a man named Woody Cooper. He had admitted to being one of the boys in the famous picture and wanted to apologize. They met up for lunch where Cooper asked her to forgive him.

They agreed to share their story and from there, did many interviews and speaking engagements together. In 2008, Dorothy Counts-Scoggins along with seven other people were honored for helping integrate North Carolina's public schools. Each honoree received the Old North State Award from Governor Mike Easley. In 2010, Harding High School renamed its library in honor of Counts-Scoggins, an honor rarely bestowed upon living persons.

In the 2016 Netflix documentary I Am Not Your Negro, James Baldwin recalled seeing photos of Counts-Scoggins, he wrote, "It made me furious and filled me with both hatred and pity and it made me ashamed--One of us should have been there with her."

== See also ==
- Delois Huntley
- Ruby Bridges
- Little Rock Nine
