= 1st Tactical Missile Squadron =

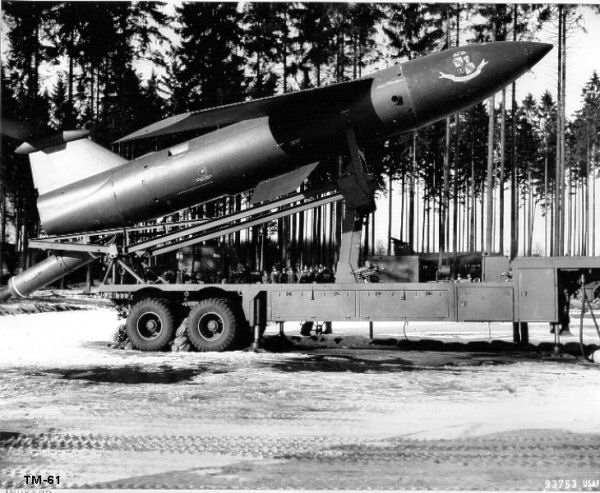
- 701st Tactical Missile Wing TM-61 Matador missile of the 1st Tactical Missile Squadron
- Active: 1943–1946; 1946–1950; 1951–1958
- Country: United States
- Branch: United States Air Force
- Role: cruise missile
- Nickname: Pioneers (1951–1958)
- Engagements: Pacific Ocean Theater of World War II
- Decorations: Distinguished Unit Citation

Insignia
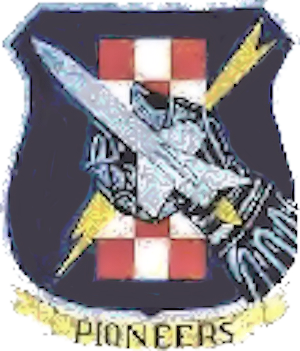
- Patch with 1st Tactical Missile Squadron Emblem

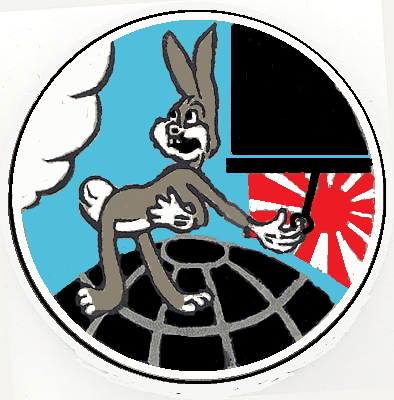
- 881st Bombardment Squadron emblem

The 1st Tactical Missile Squadron is an inactive United States Air Force unit. It was last assigned to the 585th Tactical Missile Group at Bitburg Air Base, West Germany, where it was inactivated on 18 June 1958.

The first predecessor of the squadron is the 881st Bombardment Squadron, a former United States Army Air Forces unit organized in November 1943. After training in the United States, the 881st deployed to the Pacific Ocean Theater of World War II, where it participated in the strategic bombing campaign against Japan. It earned two Distinguished Unit Citations before the end of the war. It returned to the United States in the fall of 1945 and was inactivated at March Field, California in January 1946.

The squadron's second predecessor was established as the 1st Experimental Guided Missiles Squadron, which conducted guided missile testing for the Army Air Forces and United States Air Force from bases in Florida from 1946 through 1950. It was reactivated the following year and tested cruise missiles, then trained for deployment to Europe with Martin B-61 Matador missiles. It stood alert with its missiles in Germany until it was inactivated in 1958 and transferred its personnel and missiles to the 71st Tactical Missile Squadron

== History ==
=== World War II ===
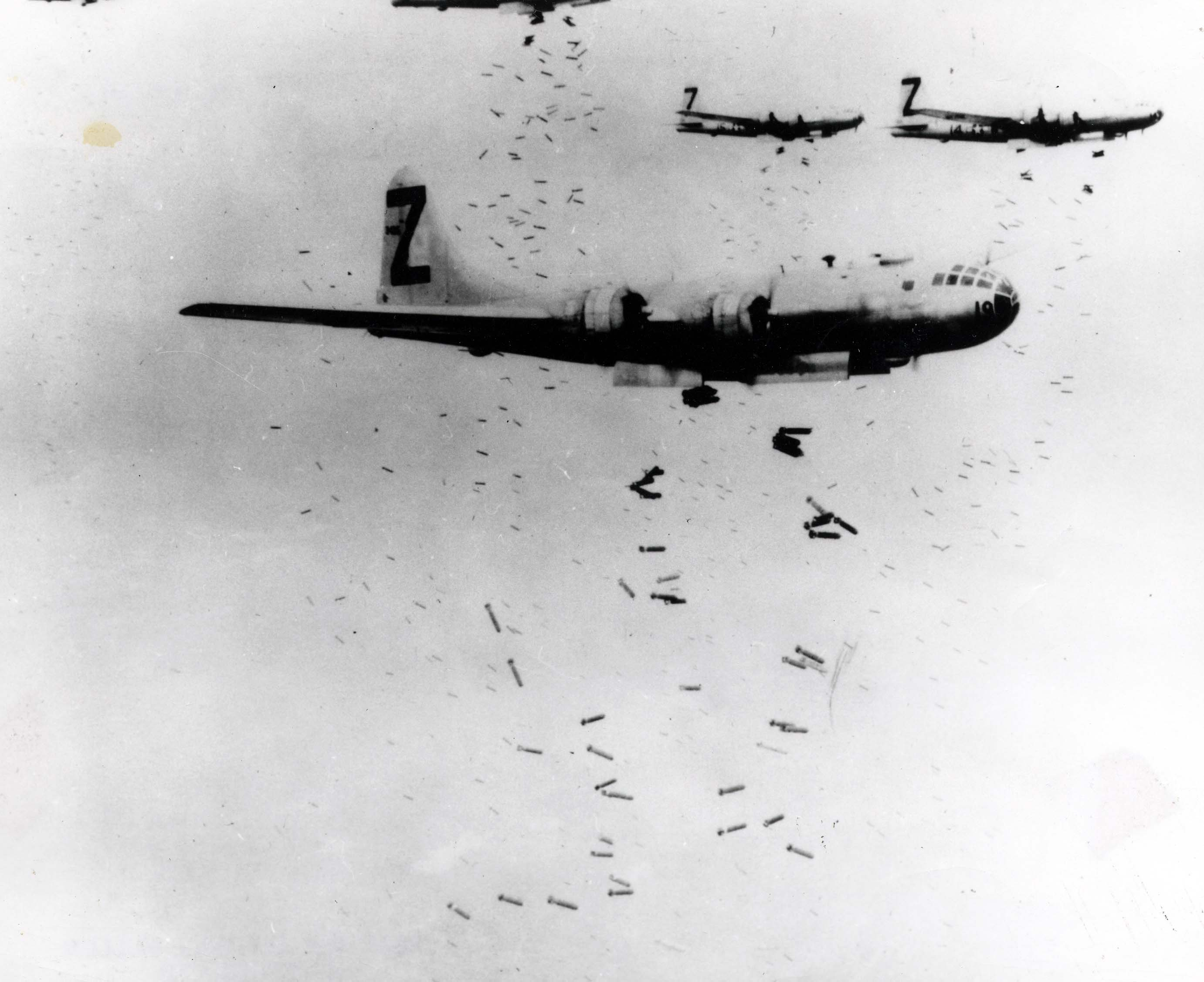
B-29 Superfortresses of the 500th Bombardment Group dropping incendiaries on Japan

The first predecessor of the unit, the 881st Bombardment Squadron, was activated at Gowen Field, Idaho on 20 November 1943 as one of the four original squadrons of the 500th Bombardment Group. It initially flew Boeing B-17 Flying Fortress bombers in New Mexico, then trained in Kansas with early model Boeing B-29 Superfortresses, with frequent delays in training due to modifications of the aircraft correcting production deficiencies.. It departed for its combat station in the Pacific in July 1944 after completing training.

The squadron arrived at its combat station, Isely Field, on Saipan in the Mariana Islands in September 1944. It flew its first combat mission against a submarine base in the Truk Islands on 11 November. Thirteen days later it participated in the first attack on the Japanese homeland from the Marianas. Initially, the squadron flew high altitude daylight raids against industrial targets in Japan. In January 1945, it carried out an attack on the Mitsubishi engine manufacturing plant in Nagoya, for which it was awarded a Distinguished Unit Citation (DUC).

The squadron was briefly diverted from its strategic mission when it struck airfields in Kyushu to support Operation Iceberg, the landings on Okinawa in April 1945. Beginning in March 1945, Twentieth Air Force changed both its tactics and strategy and the squadron began carrying out nighttime attacks with incendiaries against area targets. It received its second DUC for attacks on the urban and industrial section of Osaka, feeder industries at Hamamatsu and shipping and rail targets on Kyushu in June 1945. During the closing days of the war, the squadron also dropped propaganda leaflets over the Japanese home islands.

Following V-J Day, the squadron dropped food and supply to prisoners of war in Japan, Korea, China and Taiwan. The squadron returned to the United States in the fall of 1945 and was inactivated at March Field, California on 17 January 1946.

=== Missile testing ===
The squadron's second predecessor was organized as the 1st Experimental Guided Missiles Squadron, one of the original Army Air Forces missile test squadrons, at Eglin Field, Florida in 1946. At Eglin it was assigned to the 1st Experimental Guided Missiles Group. It tested air-to-surface missiles. The 1st Group was inactivated in July 1949, and the squadron was attached to its successor, the 550th Guided Missiles Wing. In December 1950, the squadron moved with the 550th Wing to Patrick Air Force Base, Florida, but it was not operational at Patrick and was inactivated at the end of the month, when the 550th was replaced by the 4800th Guided Missile Wing.

The squadron was redesignated the 1st Bombardment Squadron, Missile (Light), but was again redesignated the 1st Pilotless Bomber Squadron (Note: The Air Force had a 1st Bombardment Squadron, Heavy that was active at the time that would have duplicated the unit designation.) before being reactivated at Patrick in October 1951. The unit again experimented with missiles, but this time with cruise missiles, including the Republic-Ford JB-2 and Martin B-61 Matador. The squadron developed procedures and methods for deployment of tactical nuclear missiles until 1954, when it was transferred to Tactical Air Command.

=== Missile operations in Europe ===
The 1st trained until March 1954, when it deployed to United States Air Forces Europe (USAFE) and Bitburg Air Base. It maintained dispersed missile launch facilities at 'Site VII "B Pad", 3.5 miles (5.6 km) northwest of Bitburg 49°59′05″N 006°28′50″E (Note: An underground concrete launch facility, closed in 1969. The site is abandoned and largely overgrown.) and Site VIII "C Pad", 4.5 miles (7.2 km) south southwest of Bitburg 49°53′21″N 006°33′30″E (Note: An underground concrete launch facility. After closure the site was transferred to the Bundeswehr and converted into a MIM-104 Patriot air defense missile site. It closed in 2001 and is now abandoned and overgrown with vegetation.) At Bitburg, it was initially attached to the host 36th Fighter-Bomber Wing. It was the first operational United States missile unit. At Bitburg the squadron was equipped with the B-61A Matador. (Note: The B-61A Matador was renamed the TM-61A Matador, reflecting that it was a tactical missile, not a bomber.) The 1st was redesignated the 1st Tactical Missile Squadron a year later.

As additional Matador squadrons deployed to Germany, USAFE formed the 7382d Guided Missile Group, headquartered at Hahn Air Base. The 1st Tactical Missile Squadron was detached from the 36th Wing, and attached to the new group. when the 7382d Group was inactivated on 15 September 1956, the 1st Squadron was reassigned to the newly formed 585th Tactical Missile Group at Bitburg, as part of the newly formed 701st Tactical Missile Wing, headquartered at Hahn. The unit converted from the TM-61A to the TM-61C during that time. The 1st was inactivated and replaced by the 71st Tactical Missile Squadron, which was simultaneously activated on 18 Jun 1958.

In 1985 the World War II 881st Bombardment Squadron was consolidated with the squadron, but it was not activated. (Note: The United States Air Force planned to reactivate the squadron as a BGM-109G ground launched cruise missile squadron under the 550th Tactical Missile Wing at RAF Molesworth, but elected to activate a World War II bombardment wing and squadron instead.)

== Lineage ==
881st Bombardment Squadron

- Constituted as the 881st Bombardment Squadron, Very Heavy on 19 November 1943

Activated on 20 November 1943
Inactivated on 17 January 1946
Consolidated with the 1st Tactical Missile Squadron as the 1st Tactical Missile Squadron on 18 September 1985

1st Tactical Missile Squadron

- Constituted as the 1st Experimental Guided Missiles Squadron

Activated on 6 February 1946
Redesignated 1st Guided Missiles Squadron (Air to Surface Missile) on 22 July 1949
Inactivated on 30 December 1950

- Redesignated 1st Bombardment Squadron, Missile (Light) on 13 September 1951

Redesignated 1st Pilotless Bomber Squadron and activated on 1 October 1951
Redesignated 1st Tactical Missile Squadron on 14 March 1955
Inactivated 18 June 1958

- Consolidated with the 881st Bombardment Squadron on 19 September 1985 (remained inactive)

=== Assignments ===
- 500th Bombardment Group, 20 November 1943 – 17 January 1946
- 1st Experimental Guided Missiles Group: 6 February 1946
- Air Proving Ground: 20 July 1949 (attached to 550th Guided Missiles Wing)
- 550th Guided Missiles Wing: 1 August 1950 – 30 December 1950
- 6555th Guided Missile Wing (later 6555th Guided Missile Group): 1 October 1951
- Tactical Air Command: 1 January 1954
- Twelfth Air Force: 31 March 1954 (attached to 36th Fighter-Bomber Wing (later 36th Fighter-Day Wing) 31 March 1954, 7382d Guided Missile Group 15 April 1956 – 15 September 1956)
- 585th Tactical Missile Group, 15 September 1956 – 18 June 1958

=== Stations ===
- Gowen Field, Idaho, 20 November 1943
- Clovis Army Air Field, New Mexico, c. 16 December 1943
- Walker Army Air Field, Kansas, 16 April–23 July 1944
- Isely Field, Saipan, Mariana Islands, 19 September 1944 – 15 November 1945
- March Field, California, 29 November 1945 – 17 January 1946
- Eglin Field (later Eglin Air Force Base), Florida 6 February 1946
- Patrick Air Force Base, Florida, 11 December 1950 – 30 December 1950
- Patrick Air Force Base, Florida, 1 October 1951
- Bitburg Air Base, West Germany, 31 March 1954 – 18 June 1958

=== Aircraft and missiles ===
- Boeing B-17 Flying Fortress, 1944
- Boeing B-29 Superfortress, 1944–1945
- Republic-Ford JB-2, 1951
- Martin B-61 (later TM-61) Matador, 1954–1962

=== Awards and campaigns ===
Award streamer	Award	Dates	Notes
	Distinguished Unit Citation	23 January 1945	Nagoya, Japan 881st Bombardment Squadron
	Distinguished Unit Citation	15–20 June 1945	Japan 881st Bombardment Squadron

Campaign Streamer	Campaign	Dates	Notes
	Air Offensive, Japan	19 September 1944 – 2 September 1945	881st Bombardment Squadron
	Eastern Mandates	19 September 1944 – 14 April 1944	881st Bombardment Squadron
	Western Pacific	17 April 1945 – 2 September 1945	881st Bombardment Squadron
	China Offensive	5 May 1945 – 2 September 1945	881st Bombardment Squadron

== See also ==
- List of United States Air Force missile squadrons
- List of B-29 Superfortress operators
- B-17 Flying Fortress units of the United States Army Air Forces
