= Harding University High School =

Public school in North Carolina, U.S.

Location
- 2001 Alleghany Street; Charlotte, North Carolina 28208; United States; 35°14′10″N 80°54′13″W

Information
- Former names: Harry P. Harding High School (1935–1992)
- Type: Public
- Motto: Where Every Student Matters
- Established: 1935 (91 years ago)
- School district: Charlotte-Mecklenburg Schools
- CEEB code: 340670
- Principal: Kevin Poirier
- Staff: 81.11 (FTE)
- Student to teacher ratio: 15.20
- Colors: Maroon and gold
- Team name: Rams
- Website: www.cmsk12.org/hardinguniversityHS

Harding University High School is located at 2001 Alleghany Street, in Charlotte, North Carolina. It was established as a Math, Science, and Technology school in 1992, and added an International Baccalaureate to its program in 1995. The motto of the school has changed several times. It is currently: "Where Every Student Matters."

== History ==
Named after former superintendent Harry Patrick Harding (1874–1959), the school opened in the fall of 1935 under the name Harry P. Harding High School. The school moved to its current location on Alleghany Street in 1961. The school name changed to Harding University High School in 1992.

=== The Dorothy Counts Controversy ===
Dorothy Counts was the first black student admitted to the Harry P. Harding High School in 1957. She was one of the four black students enrolled at various all-white schools in the district for the first time in American history. After four days of massive harassment that threatened her safety, her parents forced her to withdraw from the school.

== Band of Gold ==
The Harding University High School Band of Gold, led by director Anthony Jones, made national coverage in January 2009 for their invitation to the 56th Inaugural Parade of President Barack Obama. Harding's was the only band chosen from North Carolina to march in the parade. The 110 person marching band made headlines for the fifty thousand dollars needed to travel to Washington, but were initially unable to raise the funds. Supporters across North Carolina made contributions to the band including Carolina Panthers wide receiver Steve Smith, who donated $25,000. Anthony S. Jones ended his twenty-year tenure as Director of Bands in 2015, moving on to serve as Director of Bands at Livingstone College.

== Notable alumni ==
- Walt Aikens, NFL cornerback
- Dorothy Counts, civil rights figure
- Ray Durham, MLB second baseman and 2x All-Star
- Jovaughn Gwyn, NFL offensive lineman
- Anthony Hamilton, singer, songwriter, and record producer
- Roy Hord Jr., NFL and American Football League player
- David Joy, author and short-story writer
- Ron Killings, professional wrestler in the WWE
- Dickie Noles, MLB pitcher and 1980 World Series champion
- L. J. McCray, NFL safety
- Pug Pearman, offensive tackle and college football first team All-American for the Tennessee Volunteers
- Gregory Richardson, college football coach
- Bobby Thompson, MLB outfielder
