= 36th Wing =

US Air Force unit

36th Wing

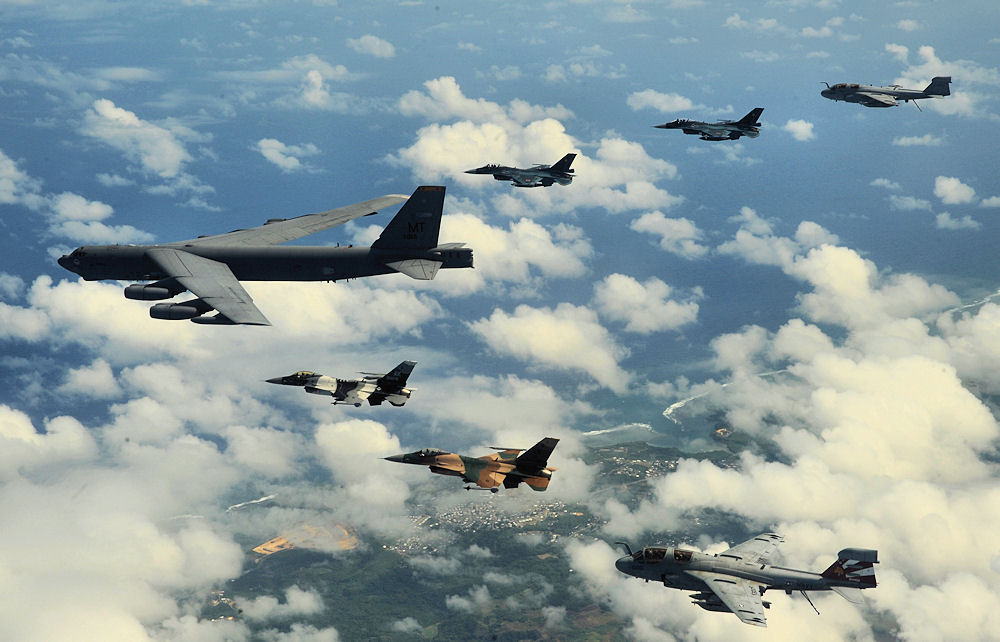
- A Boeing B-52 Stratofortress deployed to Andersen AFB leads a formation of Japanese Mitsubishi F-2s, USAF F-16s and Navy EA-6B Prowlers
- Active: 1948–1994; 1994–present
- Country: United States
- Branch: United States Air Force
- Role: Command of deployed combat forces
- Part of: Pacific Air Forces
- Garrison/HQ: Andersen Air Force Base
- Nickname: The Fightin' 36th
- Motto: Prepared to Prevail (Note: Approved 14 August 1979. Ravenstein, p. 69.)
- Decorations: Air Force Outstanding Unit Award

Commanders
- Current commander: Brig Gen Charles "Dan" Cooley
- Deputy Commander: Col. Daniel E. Mendoza
- Command Chief: CCM Jeremy Swistak
- Notable commanders: Ronald Keys

Insignia
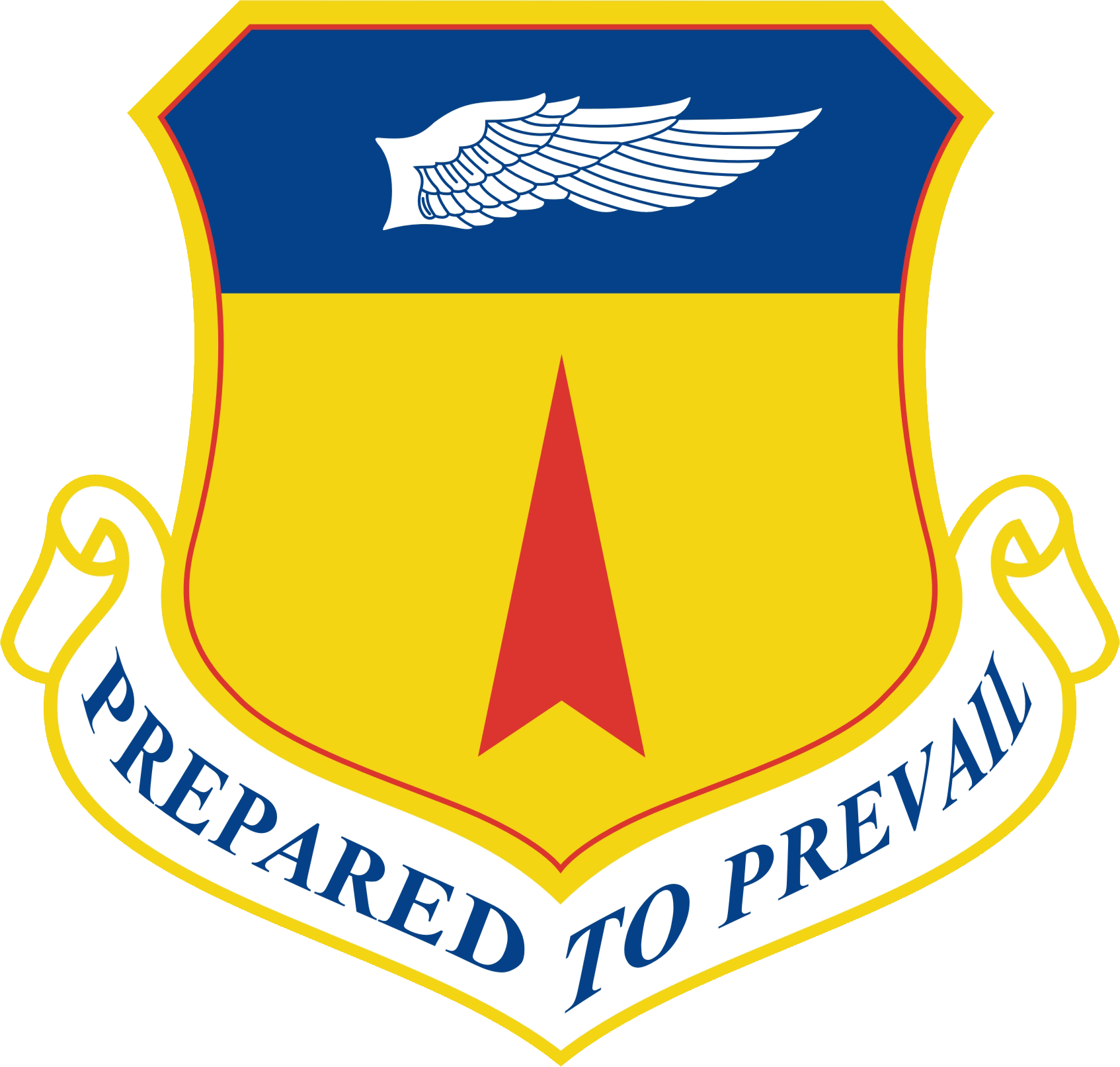
- 36th Wing emblem (Note: Approved 17 July 1952.)

The United States Air Force's 36th Wing is the host wing for Andersen Air Force Base, Guam. It is part of Pacific Air Forces' Eleventh Air Force. The 36th Wing provides day-to-day mission support to more than 9,000 military, civilian, dependent and retired personnel and 15 associate units on the base.

The 36th Wing has three major missions: operate Andersen Air Force Base via its subordinate 36th Mission Support and 36th Medical Groups; Provide power projection through rotational forces via its subordinate 36th Operations and 36th Maintenance Groups; and provide rapid air base opening and initial air base operation ability via its subordinate 36th Contingency Response Group. The 734th Air Mobility Squadron assists the 36th Wing in accomplishing this mission by operating Andersen's air cargo terminal on behalf of Air Mobility Command.

== Units ==
- 36th Operations Group
- 36th Maintenance Group
  - 36th Expeditionary Aircraft Maintenance Squadron
  - 36th Maintenance Squadron
  - 36th Munitions Squadron
- 36th Contingency Response Group
  - 736th Security Forces Squadron
  - 554th RED HORSE Squadron
  - 36th Contingency Response Squadron
  - 36th Contingency Response Support Squadron
  - 644th Combat Communications Squadron
- 36th Medical Group
  - 36th Medical Operations Squadron
  - 36th Medical Support Squadron
- 36th Mission Support Group
  - 36th Communications Squadron
  - 36th Civil Engineering Squadron
  - 36th Contracting Squadron
  - 36th Logistics Readiness Squadron
  - 36th Security Forces Squadron
  - 36th Force Support Squadron
- Mission Partner Units
  - 254th Air Base Group – Guam Air National Guard
  - 497th Combat Training Squadron
  - 624th Regional Support Group
  - 734th Air Mobility Squadron
  - Det. 1, 69th Reconnaissance Group
  - Det. 2, 21st Space Operations Squadron – U.S. Space Force (Satellite Control Network, Remote Tracking Station)
  - Det. 602, AFOSI
  - HSC-25 Island Knights
  - United States Department of Agriculture

== History ==
For additional history and lineage, see 36th Operations Group

On 2 July 1948 the United States Air Force 36th Fighter Wing was activated at Howard Air Force Base, Panama Canal Zone. The former USAAF 36th Fighter Group became the operational component of the new Air Force wing. Active squadrons of the 36th were:

- 22d Fighter Squadron (F-80A/B, Red color band)
- 23d Fighter Squadron (F-80A/B, Blue color band)
- 53d Fighter Squadron (F-80A/B, Green color band)

=== United States Air Forces in Europe ===
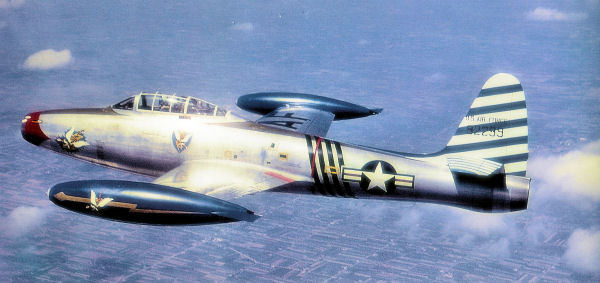
Republic F-84E-10-RE Thunderjet Serial 49-2299 of the 23d Fighter-Bomber Squadron, 1951, flown by the Wing Commander Col. Robert L. Scott. Note the 23d Fighter Group emblem on the nose, as Col. Scott was a "Flying Tiger" in China during World War II.

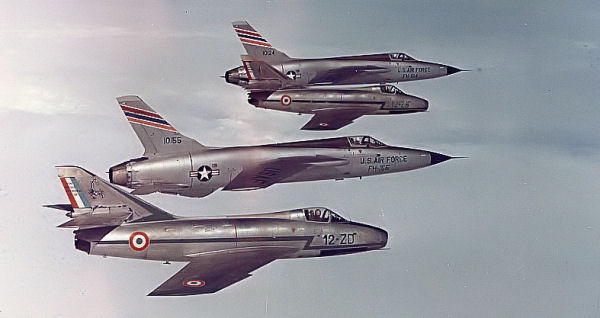
22d TFS F-105s with French Air Force Dassault Mystère B2s from Cambrai Air Base – 1964.

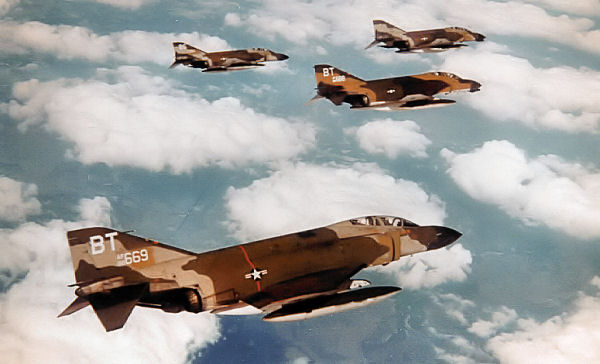
F-4Ds of the 525th Tactical fighter squadron – 1972.

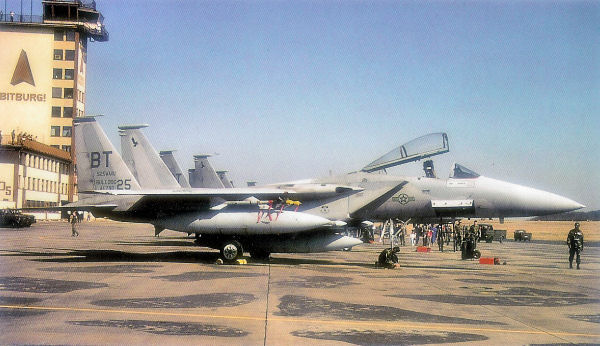
F-15s of the 53d and 525th Tactical Fighter Squadrons returning to Bitburg Air Base after being deployed in support of Operation Desert Shield/Storm, 13 March 1991.

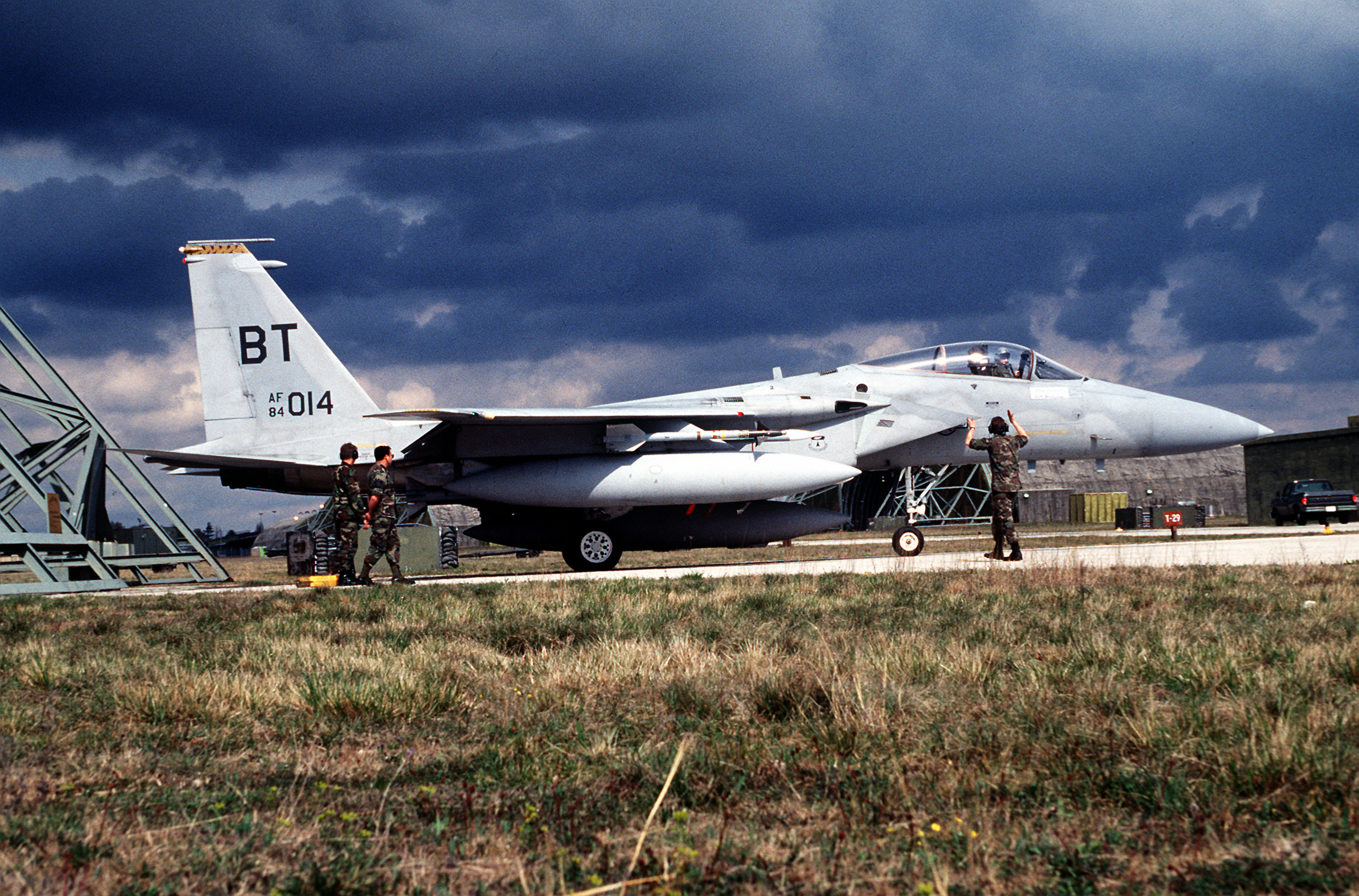
Capt. John T. Doneski of the 53rd FS shot down an Iraqi Su-22M flying 84-014 on 20 March 1991.

As a result of the Berlin Blockade and other Cold War tensions in Europe, the 36th Fighter Wing was reassigned to United States Air Forces Europe (USAFE). The squadron was assigned to Fürstenfeldbruck Air Base West Germany on 13 August 1948, being the first USAFE unit to be jet-equipped with the Lockheed F-80 Shooting Star. At Fürstenfeldbruck tactical operations included air defense, tactical exercises, maneuvers, and photographic reconnaissance. In May 1949, the wing formed the Skyblazers aerial demonstration team, which it controlled until August 1952, and again from October 1956 to January 1962 when it was disbanded.

On 20 January 1950, the wing was redesignated as the 36th Fighter-Bomber Wing when 89 Republic F-84E Thunderjets arrived. Existing USAFE bases in West Germany, however, were deemed very vulnerable to an attack by the Soviet Union, given their proximity to East Germany and other Warsaw Pact nations. Negotiations with other NATO nations were made to build new bases west of the Rhine River. The F-80s were sent back to CONUS to equip Air National Guard units. In addition to its primary installation at Fürstenfeldbruck, the wing controlled Oberpfaffenhofen AB, West Germany, December 1949 – February 1950.

The 36th FBW remained at Fürstenfeldbruck until 1952 when it was reassigned to the new Bitburg Air Base, in the Eifel mountains west of the Rhine River. Throughout the summer, elements of the 36th FBW moved into Bitburg, with the wing officially arriving in November 1952. Under various designations, the 36th would remain at Bitburg for the next 40 years.

In August 1953, the North American F-86F Sabre was introduced to the wing, replacing the F-84s. On 31 March 1954, The 1st Pilotless Bomber Squadron, equipped with the Martom B-61A Matador, was attached to the 36th Fighter Bomber Wing, making it the first operational U.S. missile unit. The 1st eventually was renamed a Tactical Missile Squadron, and in 1958 was replaced by the 71st Tactical Missile Squadron and the unit was assigned to the 701st Tactical Missile Wing, headquartered at Hahn Air Base, although the squadron remained at Bitburg.

In August 1954, the wing was redesignated as the 36th Fighter-Day Wing. In 1956, the wing received the North American F-100 Super Sabre, marking the first time a wing in USAFE flew supersonic jets. On 15 May 1958, the 36th FDW was redesignated as the 36th Tactical Fighter Wing, with its squadrons redesignated as tactical fighter squadrons, because its missions had now grown to include delivery of tactical nuclear weapons.

In May 1961, the wing received the Republic F-105 Thunderchief. Formal USAFE acceptance of the Mach 2 fighter-bombers was held at the Paris Air Show on 3 June 1961. Deliveries of the F-105D model were completed in 1963, and the 36th carried on its Cold War mission of tactical nuclear weapons delivery. Twice in the early 1960s when Cold War tensions were elevated due to the 1961 Berlin Wall crisis and 1962 Cuban Missile Crisis the 36th rose to a high level of alert.

By 1966 the Thud was being phased out of NATO, being replaced by the McDonnell F-4D Phantom II. The tactical nuclear deliver mission, still necessary, was being eclipsed by the ability of ICBMs and the primary mission of the 36th TFW changed to Tactical Air support of NATO ground units in West Germany. By December 1966, all the 36th TFW Thuds had been ferried stateside for combat crew training duties at McConnell Air Force Base, Kansas, or to Southeast Asia after stateside refurbishment.

In October 1965, the 36th accepted command of the 71st Tactical Missile Squadron from the inactivated 38th Tactical Missile Wing at Sembach Air Base. The 36th maintained and operated two hardened launch sites (at Rittersdorf, Site 7, and at Idenheim, site 8) with a total of 16 CGM-13B Mace tactical missiles until 30 April 1969.

In September 1969, the 36th TFW took responsibility for Spangdahlem Air Base West Germany until December 1971.

By 1976 a major modernization of USAFE was necessary. The Soviet Union's new generation of MiG and Sukhoi fighters made NATO military planners anxious. Indeed, intelligence reports about the MiG-25 left little room for comfort; the performance of this latest Russian combat aircraft was far superior to any NATO aircraft. The twin-engined MiG-25 reached speeds of over 3,000 km/h even at high altitude (over 70,000 feet) and it could be armed with radar-guided AA-6 Acrid air-to-air missiles. When the Soviets stationed large numbers in the Soviet Union and later in the GDR, NATO had to address this problem.

The solution was provided by the McDonnell Douglas F-15 Eagle. Just like the MiG-25 it has two powerful engines and a double tail fin. The 23 aircraft for the first operational squadron (525th Tactical Fighter Squadron) with the 36th left Langley Air Force Base on 27 April 1977 for a mass Atlantic crossing. Over the following months the aircraft for two other squadrons (23d and 53d Tactical Fighter Squadrons) arrived. The 36th's full strength of 79 fully operational F-15As was reached in December 1977. In 1980 more advanced F-15Cs and F-15Ds would replace the original F-15As.

Throughout the 1970s and 1980s, the 36th conducted routine training missions however the outbreak of the 1990–91 Gulf War put the F-15s of Bitburg into the heart of the conflict. The 36th's pilots and aircraft performed magnificently in Operation Desert Storm. Not a single F-15 aircraft was lost in combat during the war. On 13 March 1991, the deployed squadrons of the 36th returned in victory.

The celebration was brief, however, as the 36th deployed back to Incirlik Air Base, Turkey to support Operation Provide Comfort. Between 5 April and 25 May 1991, the 36th flew 285 sorties over Iraq. Just as before, not a single aircraft was lost in Iraq due to hostile fire.

On 1 October 1991 the wing was redesignated as the 36th Fighter Wing when the objective wing concept was implemented. The 525th Fighter Squadron was inactivated 31 March 1992 as part of the initial post Cold-War drawdown.

Bitburg Air Base was part of the 1993 Base Realignment and Closure (or BRAC) process that saw the drawdown of many military facilities in a series of post-Cold War force reductions. In July 1993, HQ USAFE announced the closure of Bitburg Air Base and the pending inactivation of the 36th Fighter Wing. The 53d Fighter Squadron was transferred without personnel or equipment to the 52d Operations Group at Spangdahlem Air Base. Some squadron aircraft transferred to 22d Fighter Squadron. The 22d Fighter Squadron was also transferred without personnel or equipment to the 52d Operations Group at Spangdahlem Air Base.

The wing's combat readiness was tested in Southwest Asia as part of Operations Desert Shield, Desert Storm and Proven Force. While flying combat air patrols during the war, the F-15s of the 36th were a strong deterrent to the air forces of Iraq. During Operation Desert Storm, the 36th was credited with downing 17 enemy aircraft in air-combat engagements. On 1 October 1994 the 36th Fighter Wing was inactivated and the final 36th Wing Commander, Brigadier General Roger E. Carleton, presented Bitburg Air Base to the German government.

=== Pacific Air Forces ===
The wing was reactivated at Andersen Air Force Base, Guam the same day as the 36th Air Base Wing, a non-flying organization taking over as the host unit. The former host unit, the 633d Air Base Wing was inactivated in keeping with the Air Force Chief of Staff's policy of keeping the most highly decorated and longest serving Air Force units on active duty.

The 36th Air Base Wing was activated at Andersen Air Force Base, Guam, on 30 September 1994. Under that designation, the wing lived up to its mission several times. In September 1996, the wing provided around-the-clock forward-deployment support to Air Combat Command Boeing B-52 Stratofortresses during their Operation Desert Strike missions over Iraq, and began hosting more than 6,600 Kurdish evacuees during the 8-month humanitarian assistance mission, Joint Task Force Pacific Haven.

On 12 April 2006, the 36th Air Base Wing was redesignated as the 36th Wing. Prior to the redesignation, the wing had been using a temporary designation of air expeditionary wing. The change in the wing's official designation was meant to better align Andersen with its mission statement: "To provide a U.S.-based lethal warfighting platform for the employment, deployment, reception, and throughput of air and space forces in the Asia-Pacific region."

In February 2007, the 36th Operations Group was reactivated as a permanent subordinate unit to the 36th Wing, replacing the temporary 36th Expeditionary Operations Group.

== Lineage ==
- Established as the 36th Fighter Wing on 17 June 1948

Activated on 2 July 1948
Redesignated 36th Fighter-Bomber Wing on 20 January 1950
Redesignated 36th Fighter-Day Wing on 9 August 1954
Redesignated 36th Tactical Fighter Wing on 8 July 1958
Redesignated 36th Fighter Wing on 1 October 1991
Inactivated on 1 October 1994
Redesignated 36th Air Base Wing and activated on 1 October 1994
Redesignated 36th Wing on 15 March 2006

=== Assignments ===
- Caribbean Air Command, 2 July 1948 (attached to 6th Fighter Wing until 28 July 1948)
- United States Air Forces in Europe, 13 August 1948 (attached to 2d Air Division 6–17 September 1949)
- 2d Air Division, 10 October 1949
- Twelfth Air Force, 7 May 1951 (attached to Flight A, HQ Twelfth Air Force (Advanced Echelon), 7 May 1951, Twelfth Air Force [Advanced Echelon], 21 May 1951 – 26 April 1953)
- United States Air Forces in Europe, 1 January 1958 (attached to United States Air Forces in Europe (Advanced Echelon), 1 January 1958 – 14 November 1959)
- Seventeenth Air Force, 15 November 1959
- United States Air Forces in Europe, 1 September 1966
- Seventeenth Air Force, 30 June 1991
- United States Air Forces in Europe, 1 October 1991 – 1 October 1994
- Pacific Air Forces, 1 October 1994
- Eleventh Air Force 28 September 2012 – present

=== Components ===
Wings

- 121st Tactical Fighter Wing: attached 12–27 May 1977
- 7149th Tactical Fighter Wing: attached 15 April – 15 September 1969

Group

- 36th Fighter Group (later 36th Fighter-Bomber Group, 36th Fighter Day Group, 36th Operations Group): 2 July 1948 – 8 December 1957 (not operational after 1 October 1956), 31 March 1992 – 1 October 1994; 15 March 2006 – present

Squadrons

- 1st Pilotless Bomber Squadron (later 1st Tactical Missile Squadron): attached 14 March 1955 – 15 April 1956.
- 7th Tactical Fighter Squadron: attached 2 March – 4 April 1973, 3 April – 3 May 1974, 4 October – 6 November 1975
- 9th Tactical Fighter Squadron: attached 12 September – 6 October 1970, 4 February – 15 March 1973, 6 September – 7 October 1975
- 18th Tactical Reconnaissance Squadron: attached 12–28 April 1977.
- 22d Fighter-Day Squadron (later 22d Tactical Fighter Squadron, 22d Fighter Squadron), attached 1 October 1956 – 7 December 1957, assigned 8 December 1957 – 31 March 1992 (not operational 25 October 1976 – 30 June 1977)
- 23d Fighter-Day Squadron (later 23d Tactical Fighter Squadron), attached 1 October 1956 – 7 December 1957, assigned 8 December 1957 – 31 December 1971
- 32d Fighter-Day Squadron (later 32d Tactical Fighter Squadron, 32d Fighter-Interceptor Squadron: attached 1 October 1956 – 7 December 1957, assigned 8 December 1957 – 8 April 1960
- 39th Tactical Electronic Warfare Squadron: attached 1 April 1969 – 31 December 1971
- 45th Tactical Reconnaissance Squadron: attached 13 August 1948 – 25 March 1949
- 53d Fighter-Day Squadron (later 53d Tactical Fighter Squadron, 53d Fighter Squadron)], attached 1 October 1956 – 7 December 1957, assigned 8 December 1957 – 31 March 1992 (not operational, 1 February – July 1977)
- 71st Tactical Missile Squadron: 1 October 1965 – 30 April 1969
- 461st Tactical Fighter Squadron: attached 1 October 1956 – 7 December 1957, assigned 8 December 1957 – 1 August 1959
- 525th Fighter-Interceptor Squadron (later 525th Tactical Fighter Squadron): 1 November 1968 – 31 March 1992 (not operational, 9 March – 26 April 1977)

=== Stations ===
- Howard Air Force Base, Panama Canal Zone, 2–25 July 1948
- Furstenfeldbruck Air Base, Germany, 13 August 1948
- Bitburg Air Base, Germany, 17 November 1952 – 1 October 1994
- Andersen Air Force Base, Guam, 1 October 1994 – present

== Shakey the Pig ==
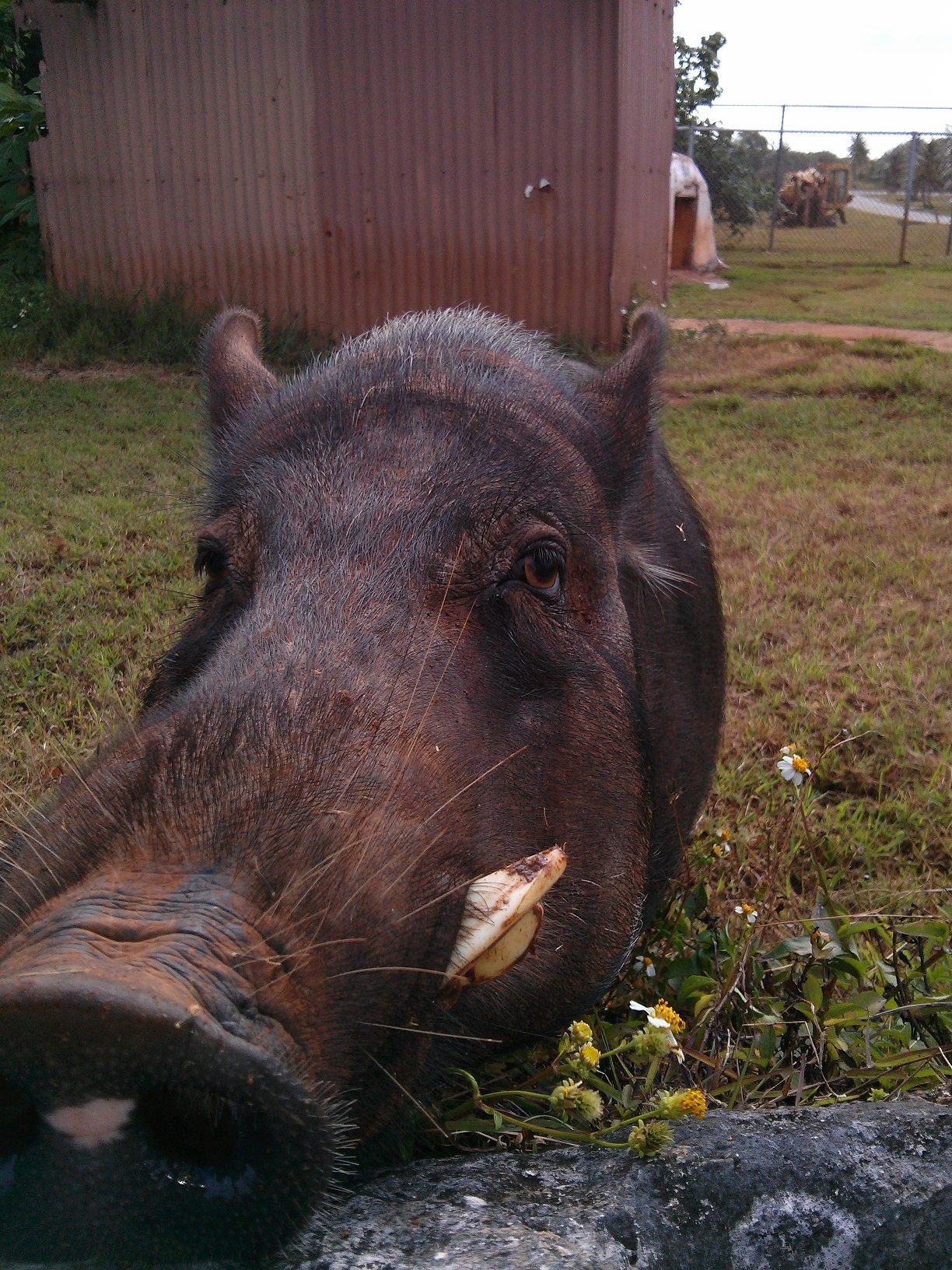
Shakey the Pig (2014)

Shakey the Pig is the wild boar mascot of 36th Munitions Squadron at Andersen AFB. The first boar given this name was captured in the late 1970s from the jungle near the munitions flight storage area, with the intention of slaughtering the animal and cooking it on a barbecue. The airmen relented and kept it as a mascot. When the incumbent mascot dies, another is caught from the jungle to take its place. It is rumored that some Shakeys "were the guests of honor at more barbecues than people might imagine" and MSgt David Torelli has said at least one Shakey "was the main course at a local wedding dinner."

== List of commanders ==
- Brig Gen Charles D. Cooley, 20 May 2025 - Present
- Brig Gen Thomas B. Palenske, 30 June 2023 - 20 May 2025
