= Thomas J. Pearsall =

American politician

- Born: Thomas Jenkins Pearsall; February 11, 1903; Rocky Mount, North Carolina
- Died: May 5, 1981 (aged 78)
- Resting place: Pineview Cemetery
- Education: University of North Carolina at Chapel Hill
- Occupation: Attorney
- Spouse: Emily Elizabeth Braswell
- Children: 2 sons
- Parent(s): Leon F. Pearsall; Maryetta Jenkins

Thomas J. Pearsall (1903-1981) was an American attorney, politician and philanthropist from North Carolina. He served in the North Carolina House of Representatives and the North Carolina Senate. He was the main instigator of the Pearsall Plan.

== Early life ==
Thomas J. Pearsall was born on February 11, 1903, in Rocky Mount, North Carolina.

Pearsall was educated in public schools in Rocky Mount. He went to prep school, the Georgia Military Academy, in his senior year. He graduated from the University of North Carolina at Chapel Hill in 1927, where he studied the Law.

== Career ==
Pearsall started his career as an attorney in Rocky Mount in 1927.

Pearsall served in the North Carolina House of Representatives from 1941 to 1947. He served as the Speaker of the House in 1947. He then served as a member of the North Carolina Senate.

In 1956, Pearsall devised the Pearsall Plan, which meant that in the wake of mandatory desegregation of public schools, white students could receive funding to attend private schools. That same year, he was a co-founder of the North Carolina Wesleyan College. He served on the board of governors of the Research Triangle Institute.

Pearsall served as the president of the Citizens Savings and Loan Association of Rocky Mount. Additionally, he served on the board of directors of the Planters National Bank and Trust Company.

== Philanthropy ==
Pearsall served as the chairman of the board of the Roanoke Island Historical Association from 1975 to 1981. Additionally, he served on the board of trustees of the Children's Home Society and the Asheville School for Boys.

== Personal life ==
Pearsall married Emily Elizabeth Braswell, an heiress to the M. C. Braswell Company, in 1930. They had two sons, Thomas J. Jr., and Mack Braswell.

== Death ==
Pearsall died on May 5, 1981. He was buried at the Pineview Cemetery.
