= Allen School (Asheville, North Carolina) =

Defunct private high school in Asheville, North Carolina

- Asheville, North Carolina; United States

The Allen School, also known as Allen High School, was a private high school in Asheville, North Carolina for African-American students. Originally known as the Allen Industrial Training School, and later as Allen Home High School, it opened in 1887 and closed in 1974. Built on land donated by Mr. and Mrs. L. M. Pease and later named for Marriage Allen, an English Quaker philanthropist, who donated money for the construction of a dormitory building, the school was directed by the Woman’s Home Missionary Society of the Methodist Episcopal Church, later the United Methodist Church.

Serving children during the day and adults at night, the Allen School devoted its mission to teaching African American students to read and write. Within one month of opening, the Asheville Citizen Times reported that more than one hundred students had enrolled, and by the end of the first school year over two hundred students were attending classes. Just one year after being founded, in 1888, a high school curriculum was added. By 1892 the Allen School became a boarding school primarily for Black female students, although boys continued to attend until 1941.

Known for its high academic standards, the school became an accredited high school in 1924, and in 1940 was admitted as a member of the Southern Association of Colleges and Secondary Schools, a distinction received by only two high schools for Black students in the 17 counties making up western North Carolina. By this time, the focus of the Allen School had shifted to college preparatory work and the grade school had been dropped. Thereafter, the school was known as an all-girls boarding high school, with about two-thirds of students coming from Western North Carolina and the rest from other states in the country, as well as outside the United States.

The records for the Allen School are located in the Special Collections Research Center at Appalachian State University.

== Educational mission ==
The Allen School, which employed mostly white female teachers who were missionaries, emphasized “Christian ideals.” According to Jamie Butcher, the “Religious centering of the school ebbed and flowed according to church policy and the religious climate of the time.” But the school retained a focus on “Christian ideals” and was connected to Berry Temple Methodist Church, also located in the Asheville.

In addition to its dedication to Christian ideals, the Allen School had a threefold mission centered on the “industrial, mental, and physical.” Industrial refers to vocational training provided to students, which revolved around the training of teachers, but also included classes related to domestic tasks, such as cooking and sewing. While the value of an industrial education for Black students was certainly debated, notably between Booker T. Washington and W.E.B. DuBois, the Allen School did function as a normal school. But it also offered a variety of classes, including ones related to religion, business, music, the sciences, and foreign languages.

As a result of its high academic standards and focus on college preparation, by the 1950s, approximately 50% of Allen School graduates attended college, including Wellesley and Vassar. And by 1972, two years before the school closed, more than 75% of the graduates went on to attend four-year colleges.

== Closure ==
The Allen School closed on June 3, 1974. By the fall of 1965, high schools in Western North Carolina were desegregating. As a result, the Allen School had difficulty surviving financially. According to then principal, Ruth Walter, “We just couldn’t charge the tuition we needed to keep the school running.” The year it closed, the Allen School graduated 10 girls, which brought the total number of graduates from the school to 1,177.

== Notable alumnae ==
- Dorothy Counts, civil rights pioneer
- Christine Darden, aerospace engineer, Class of 1958, Valedictorian
- Andrea Lawrence, computer scientist, Class of 1964
- Nina Simone 1933–2003, singer, pianist, composer, and activist, Class of 1950, Valedictorian
