= Andrea Lawrence (professor) =

American computer scientist and educator

- Born: October 6, 1946 (age 78); Asheville, North Carolina, U.S.

Academic background
- Education: Purdue University (BS); Atlanta University (MS); Georgia Tech (PhD)

Academic work
- Discipline: Computer science
- Sub-discipline: Programming language theory Human–computer interaction

Andrea Lawrence (born October 6, 1946) is an American computer scientist and educator. She is an associate professor of computer science at Spelman College.

== Early life and education ==
Lawrence was born in Asheville, North Carolina. She graduated from Allen High School in 1964 and went on to enroll at Spelman College, before ultimately earning a Bachelor of Science degree in mathematics from Purdue University in 1970. She earned Master of Science in computer science from Atlanta University in 1985, and in 1993, she became the first African-American to earn a Ph.D. in computer science from Georgia Tech.

== Career ==
From 1979 until 1983, before pursuing graduate education, she taught math in Cincinnati Public Schools.

Lawrence has been a faculty member at Spelman College since 1985 and has taught courses on computer science, the theory of programming languages, and computer-human interactions.

In 2018, Lawrence was credited by Juan E. Gilbert, the principal investigator for a National Science Foundation-funded program called "Broadening Participation in Computing", as the reason he finished his own Ph.D. Gilbert said that Lawrence, then chair of the computer science department at Spelman College, motivated him by introducing him to other black computer science doctoral students.

In 2014, Lawrence was awarded the SIGCSE award for Lifetime Service to the computer science education community. The award honors an individual with a long history of dedicated volunteer service to the computer science education community.
