= Pearsall Plan =

The Pearsall Plan to Save Our Schools, known colloquially as the Pearsall Plan, was North Carolina's 1956 attempt at a delayed approach to integrate their public schools after racial segregation of schools was ruled unconstitutional by the United States Supreme Court ruling Brown v. Board of Education (1954). Many southern states were challenged by the Brown ruling as they faced opposition to integration from residents.

North Carolina decided to highlight moderation, acknowledging that school integration was inevitable, rather than promoting active resistance like Alabama, Virginia, and other southern states. To find a creative solution, the North Carolina Advisory Committee on Education established the Pearsall Committee, named after its chairman, Thomas J. Pearsall, a landholder and notable public figure from Rocky Mount. The Pearsall Committee created the Pearsall Plan, which was intended to gradually integrate the North Carolina public school system. Some observers believe this scheme hindered the fight for equality for students across the state for years. Others believe that the resulting legislation helped the society adapt to the drastic social changes related to school integration.

== Terms of the Pearsall Plan ==
Rather than having the North Carolina State Board of Education direct the pace of integration, the Pearsall Plan decentralized decisionmaking to the individual local school boards, which were dominated by whites, as most blacks were still disenfranchised, dating from a 1900 suffrage amendment, and were prevented from running for office or voting. The Pupil Assignment Act, which preceded the Pearsall Plan, provided for parents to receive a monetary grant if a child was placed into a mixed school against their wishes.

Under the Pearsall Plan, many school districts maintained segregated schools and denied the transfer applications of black students to white schools. It also provided that any child not accepted to a private school, and who was placed into a mixed public school, would not be forced to attend school. The community could evaluate schools and shut down any it considered "intolerable" by a vote. Thus, a predominantly white neighborhood could vote to shut down a mixed school if they felt it unfit for their children to share its classrooms.

According to the Pearsall Committee, their proposition was, "the building of a new school system on a new foundation – a foundation of no racial segregation by law, but assignment according to natural racial preference and the administrative determination of what is best for the child." The Committee believed that segregation of schools was natural and students could continue to prosper without the aid of laws. (The lack of African-American representation in the state legislature and local offices resulted in the continual underfunding of black schools and other facilities, showing that white students "could continue to prosper".) The struggle for unified schools in North Carolina continued for the next two decades, ultimately resulting in the integration of schools.

== Defiance of the government ==
Many critics cite the wording of the Pearsall Plan as evidence of it expressing defiance of the Supreme Court rather than being an effort to accomplish desegregation. They consider the title of "the Pearsall Plan to Save our Schools" as implying the Court was destroying the public school system by its ruling. They suggest that the document is intended to question the ruling of the Supreme Court, rather than implement its direction. Suggesting that integration will lead to situations in which schools become "intolerable" seems to show that the Pearsall Plan was intended to halt rather than moderate integration. The question and answer section of the Plan states that the legislative action was not a defiance of the US Supreme Court's decision; rather, it was "an attempt to stay within that decision, even though a great majority of our citizens disapprove of the Supreme Court's ruling." Persuaded that the ruling was not what the "community" wanted, the Pearsall Committee developed a plan that minimized the ruling's effects. The "answer" section claims that the Supreme Court abused its power by ruling on public education, believed to belong to the states. Some opponents were bitter about states rights arguments.

== Necessity of the Plan ==
The Pearsall Committee recognized that the integration of schools was inevitable and would result in social changes. The Pearsall Committee, especially Thomas Pearsall, believed they needed to prepare a plan to help the state prepare for change. Pearsall's son, Mack, said his father had anticipated, "a very tension filled environment – a major change in lifestyles and folkways and mores." The committee tried to create a plan that would enable only as much action as the people of North Carolina wanted. They believed rushing into wholesale change would result in chaos. That was avoided, but, by allowing communities not to make any changes, in many places, there were multiple years of stagnancy after the release of the Pearsall Plan, during which nothing was accomplished. The Committee had tried to find the right balance between action and chaos.

== Political implications ==
Strategically, the Pearsall Plan decentralized decision making to the school boards, which also enabled elected politicians to get out of the middle of the fight. Handing responsibility to the school boards enabled politicians to escape the spotlight and maintain an ostensibly neutral stance on school desegregation. According to one resident, the state's decision to let the local town boards decide was to "make it clear that the state itself, from Raleigh, is not masterminding or trying to assure a particular result." By doing this, the state school board also escaped having to make a controversial decision, which would likely be criticized from either or both sides.

== Criticisms of the Plan ==
The African-American community criticized the amendments because they appeared to help whites and provide few or no benefits to African-American students. Critics criticized the unequal representation of the races on the Pearsall Committee as the primary reason for the unbalanced plan. They believed that a committee with sixteen white and three black citizens could not fairly represent society. Regulations related to the Plan proved a barrier to black students and some whites. A student wishing to challenge their assignment had to contact their school board directly; no independent bodies were keeping track of complaints to evaluate the performance of school boards as a whole. The appeals process required submission of materials related to distinct and detailed clauses that were difficult for uneducated and under-educated parents to fill out. If students' appeals were not correctly submitted, the boards would reject their requests. As a result of these factors, "most school boards denied every request filed by a black student to transfer from an assigned black school to a white school" until the early 1960s. Only one family was granted a monetary voucher for being placed into an integrated school. North Carolina lagged behind Florida, Tennessee, Texas, and Virginia in terms of the pace of enrolling black students in integrated schools. Many African Americans in North Carolina were dismayed by the lack of progress, as they had been hopeful about the Brown ruling being a catalyst for school integration.

== Reaction toward the Plan ==
Though many people supported the integration of schools in principle, they were wary about the implications of quick social change. The Pearsall Plan seemed to reject any social change. A poll released in February 1956 stated that forty-seven percent of African Americans in the South did not support the Brown ruling because they feared their children would be spurned and not afforded a truly fair education from white teachers. At the same time, they did not support the Pearsall Plan because it had the potential to halt the trend toward change altogether. Benjamin L. Smith, the white superintendent of Greensboro schools wrote, "After careful deliberation it is my opinion that desegregation is an idea whose hour has arrived." He believed that North Carolina and the US were ready for desegregation to begin. He cautioned against moving too fast, saying, "Three hundred years of social distinctions have established customs and traditions that cannot and ought not be overthrown over night."

=== Impact on Charlotte ===
Though in general, the sentiments regarding the Pearsall Plan were similar throughout North Carolina, the results of school integration would have a wider ranging effect on the city of Charlotte. Since the beginning of the 20th century, Charlotte was completely segregated, both in schools and in the entire culture of the city. There was even a divide between the parts of town where the blacks lived and where the whites lived. Thus, when Brown was passed, the effort to desegregate in Charlotte revolved around a complete culture revolution rather than just a change in the education system. The NAACP was integral in helping to advocate for black students in their attempts to attend the predominantly white schools, which had better resources for their students. However, despite this backing, there was harsh criticism of the idea that schools could simply be integrated because there was such a massive difference in the cultures of the students. The vast majority of the applicants that attempted to switch into the better funded schools were rejected and segregation in the city continued. Finally, during the summer of 1957, the Charlotte School Board agreed to enact voluntary desegregation to avoid further national or state-ordered mandates. The effort turned out to be relatively unsuccessful as the protesters at Harry Harding High School received national attention for their protest of the enrollment of Dorothy Counts, embarrassing the city leaders. They crowded around the doors to the school in an attempt to prevent Dorothy from entering, resulting in two arrests. This misconduct, however, would fuel a series of successful and peaceful desegregation efforts as blacks and whites worked together to reform the city's reputation and end segregation throughout the city.

== Thomas Pearsall's regret ==
Thomas J. Pearsall, who is most credited for the Pearsall Plan, would later regret leading such an important and controversial decision in the integration of schools. After falling ill with lymphoma, Pearsall reflected on how the actions of the committee had affected everyone. His wife noted that in his waning days, Pearsall's interactions with black people became more strained as he felt that he had done wrong to them. He was quoted saying, "I don't want to go to my grave feeling that I haven't done the best I could for the blacks." Though others reassured him that he did in fact, do everything possible to appease everyone, evidence shows he, himself, did not believe this to be completely true. This is perhaps due to the fact that at the time of his death, in 1981, the majority of the schools in North Carolina had been forced to integrate, often ending in clashes between the races. However, despite the tremendous guilt he experienced, Pearsall's reputation remained relatively clean. He is highly regarded for his work with the Pearsall Plan despite setting back the integration of North Carolina schools a number of years. This is an indication that people did not blame Pearsall but rather the local prejudices that ultimately would hinder the ability for everyone to access equal opportunities. His son, Mack Pearsall, noted that his father dedicated a portion of his life working towards equality for all people and struggled when producing the Pearsall Plan because he feared he would go down in history as an enemy of the black community. Though Pearsall stalled the ability of blacks to gain equal educational opportunities, many people still claim that his actions were necessary in preventing the chaos from erupting from the Brown v. Board of Education result.

== See also ==
- Sibley Commission
