= Bitburg Airport =

Bitburg Airport Flugplatz Bitburg
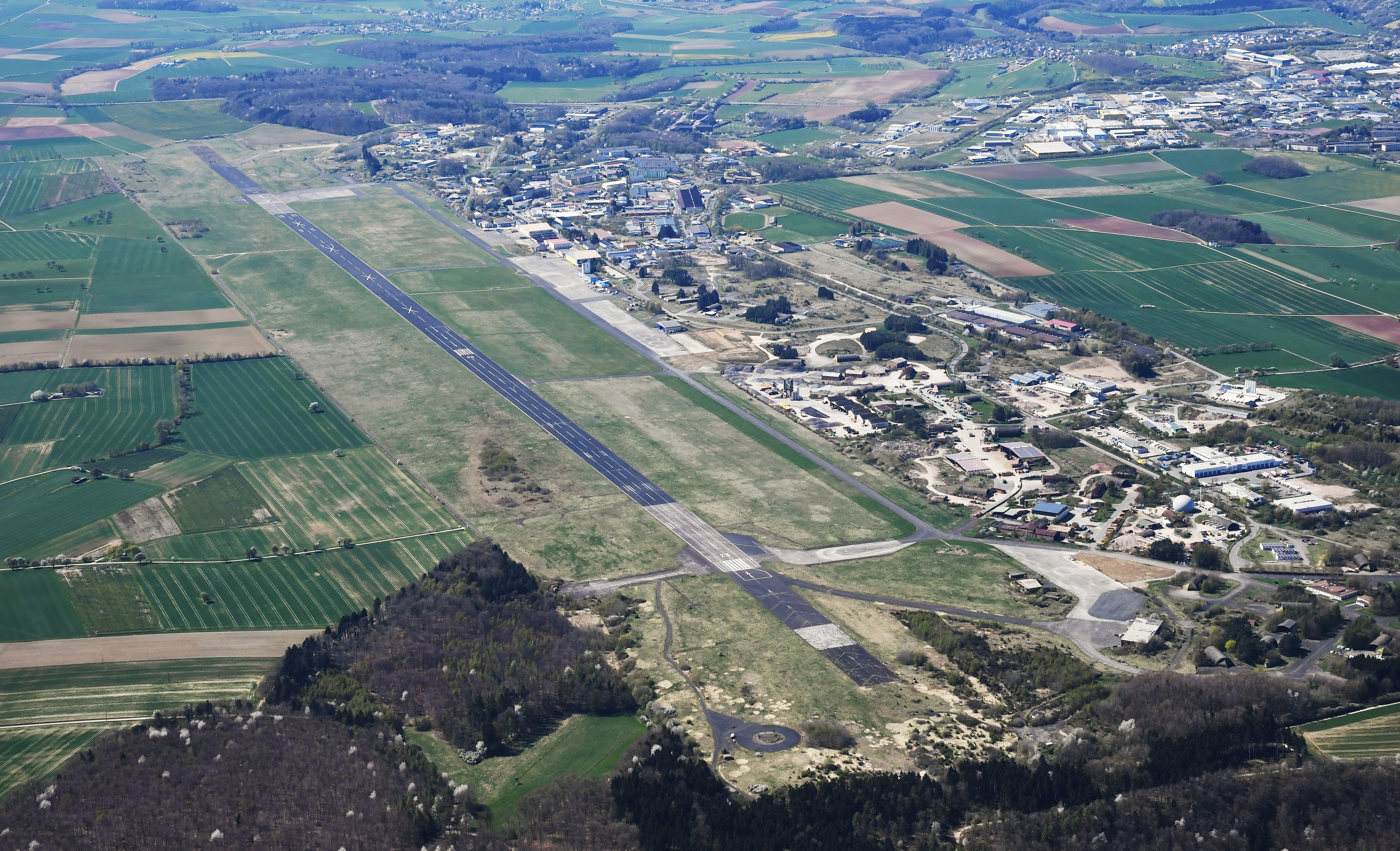
- IATA: BBJ; ICAO: EDRB

Summary
- Airport type: Public
- Operator: Flugplatz Bitburg GmbH
- Serves: Bitburg, Germany
- Elevation AMSL: 1,227 ft (374 m)
- Coordinates: 49°56′43″N 006°33′54″E

Map
- Location within Germany

Runways
Direction	Length		Surface
Direction	m	ft	Surface
05/23	1,230	4,035	Asphalt
- Source: DAFIF

Bitburg Airport (German: Flugplatz Bitburg) (IATA: BBJ, ICAO: EDRB) is a commercial airport serving Bitburg, a city in the Rhineland-Palatinate state of Germany. It is located 2 miles (3.2 km) southeast of Bitburg, 32 km (20 mi) north of Trier, and 217 km (135 mi) west of Wiesbaden.

== History ==
From 1952 until 1994, Bitburg Air Base was a front-line NATO air base. It was the home of the United States Air Force's 36th Tactical Fighter Wing for over 40 years as part of the United States Air Forces in Europe (USAFE).

Under contract with the United States Air Force, the French Army began construction of what would become the base in Western Germany's Eifel Mountains in early 1951. Located in the French occupation zone, construction began on farm land that had been a Wehrmacht tank staging and supply area for the Battle of the Bulge in late 1944. The air base and its housing area occupied nearly 1,100 acres (445 ha), with a 8,200-foot (2,500 m) long runway (with 1,000-foot (300 m) overruns at each end, total length would be 10,200 ft).

In July 1952, the 53rd Fighter-Bomber Squadron from the 36th Wing moved from Fürstenfeldbruck Air Base a few miles west of Munich and arrived at the newly built base. Throughout the summer, elements of the 36th FBW moved into Bitburg, with the wing officially arriving in November 1952.

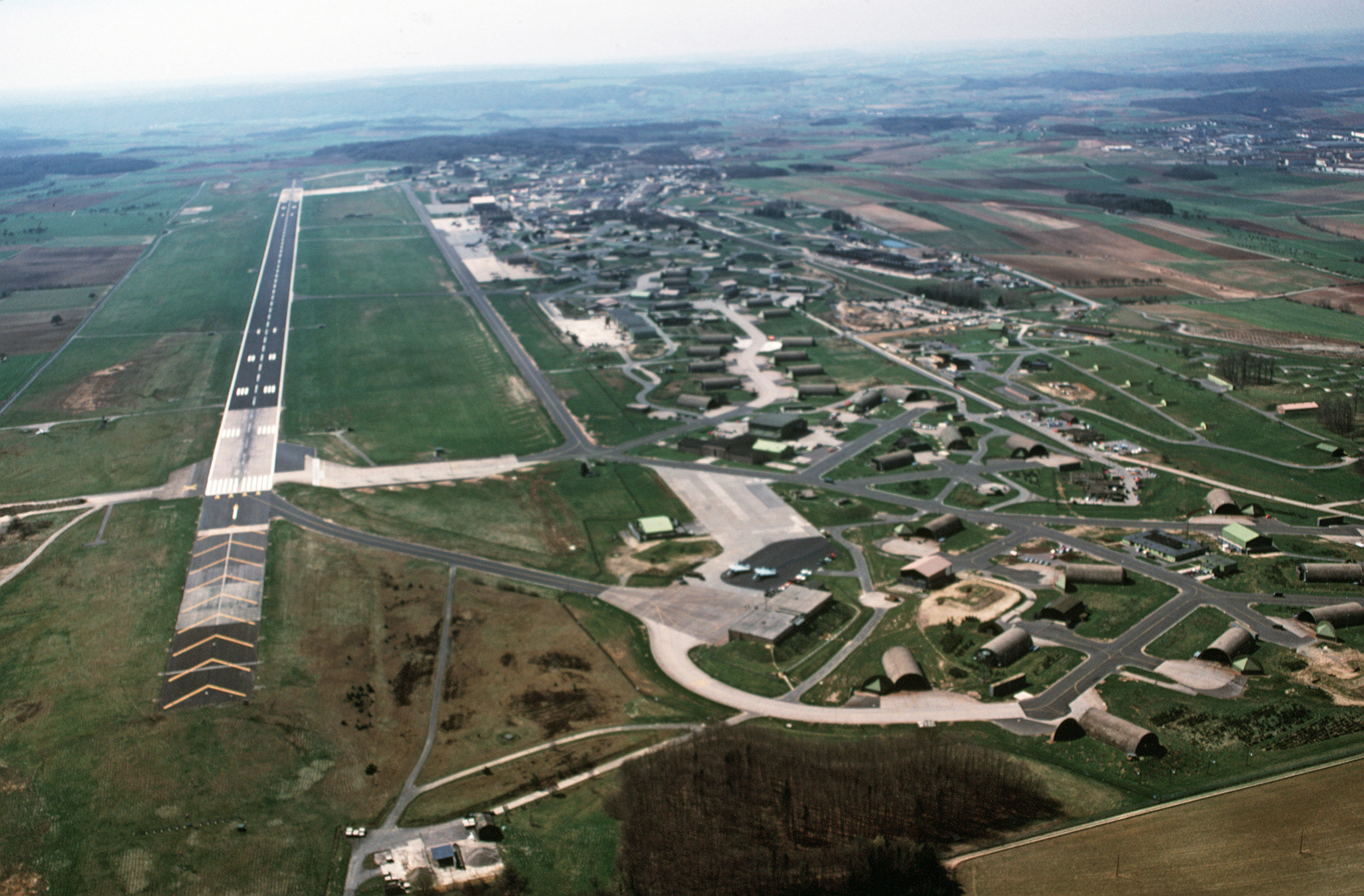
Bitburg Air Base in 1988

With the end of the Cold War, it was deemed that Bitburg AB was no longer needed as a military base and it was turned over to the German government on 1 October 1994. Between June and September 1997, it was necessary to repair the Spangdahlem Air Base runway and that called for a temporary location to accommodate the 52d Fighter Wing's three squadrons of F-15s and F-16s. Bitburg Airport was the most logical place—only 10 miles (16 km) down the road. The USAF departed for the second time in September 1997, and Bitburg Airport was returned to civilian use.

On September 15, 2008, the Ministry of Transport of Rhineland-Palatinate granted the airport contractor landing rights for aircraft with a maximum takeoff weight of more than 14 tonnes (15 short tons; 14 long tons). The airport contracting company is currently evaluating plans to develop the airport into a regional freight airport.

== Airlines and destinations ==
There are no scheduled airline services to and from Bitburg Airport.

== Nearby Air Force support community ==
Although the airport was officially returned to the German government, the United States held on to the land annexed for housing soldiers and their families. This land was designated as extra housing for airmen and their families, numerous support facilities, such as schools, a commissary, and a hospital. The intention to return these facilities was always the plan, but unknown when it would take place. In May 2017, the Bitburg base's high school was officially closed after over 60 years in operation. This marked the beginning the return of the land to Germany. The task of preparing the base was put to the U.S. armed forces. After families were relocated and buildings prepared to be returned in November 2017, the base had a small ceremony to commemorate the end of United States military presence since 1952. After the ceremony, the last military personnel left the base officially handing over the community back to the German Government.

== See also ==
- Transport in Germany
- List of airports in Germany
