= 527th Space Aggressor Squadron =

U.S. Space Force aggressor squadron

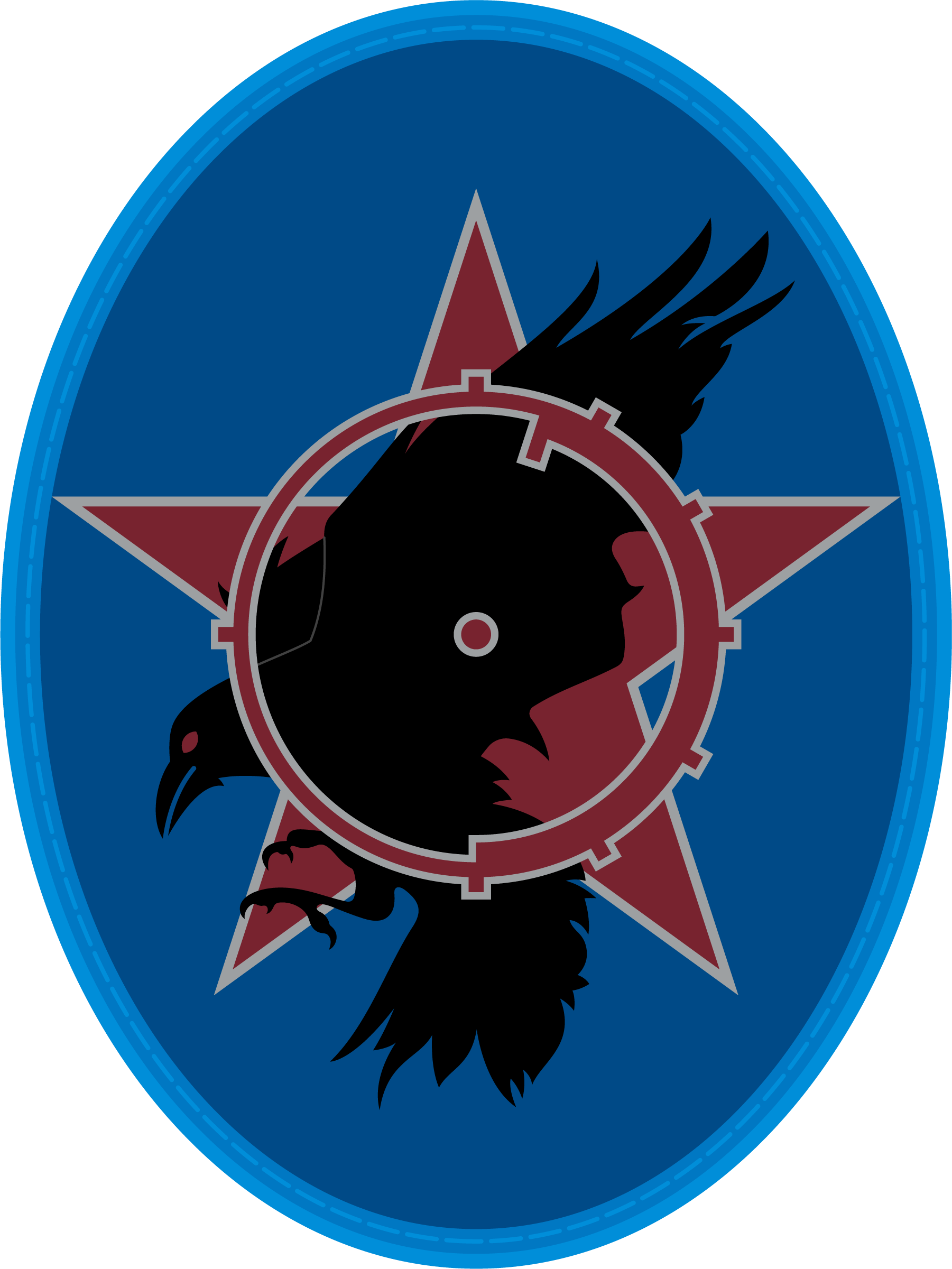
- Squadron emblem
- Active: 1942–1946; 1946–1956; 1976–1990; 2000-present
- Country: United States
- Branch: United States Space Force
- Type: Squadron
- Role: Space Adversary Tactics
- Part of: Space Delta 11
- Garrison/HQ: Schriever Space Force Base, Colorado
- Nickname: Aggressors
- Engagements: Mediterranean Theater of Operations
- Decorations: Distinguished Unit Citation; Air Force Outstanding Unit Award

Commanders
- Current commander: Lt Col Keturah "KT" Onukwuli

Insignia
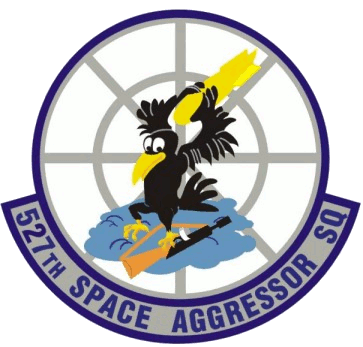
- 527th Space Aggressor Squadron emblem (approved 5 January 2001)

- 527th Aggressor Squadron emblem

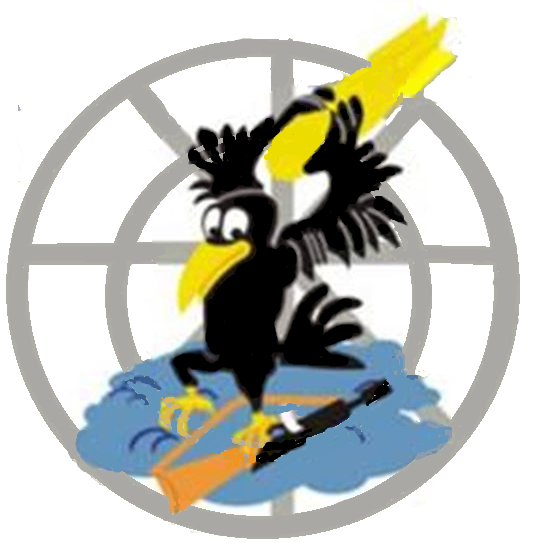
- 312th Bombardment Squadron emblem (approved 11 January 1943)

The 527th Space Aggressor Squadron is a United States Space Force unit assigned to the Space Training and Readiness Command. The unit traces its lineage to the 312th Bombardment Squadron (Light) constituted in 1942. It presents realistic adversary threats to US and allied military forces to improve their training for space-associated operations. It is stationed at Schriever Space Force Base, Colorado. Its present form dates from its activation as part of the United States Air Force in 2000. That year it was activated as part of the Space Warfare Centre, but it was then transferred to the 57th Adversary Tactics Group in 2006. The mission was augmented with the activation of a United States Air Force Reserve associate unit, the 26th Space Aggressor Squadron, on 1 October 2003. With the formation of the Space Force in 2019, the squadron was part of the second wave of transfers and reorganizations which took place in mid-2020. It was realigned under Space Delta 11 upon that organizations activation in 2021.

== Mission ==
Its mission is to train US, joint and allied military forces for combat with space-capable adversaries; preparing USAF, Joint and Allied Forces for combat through realistic threat replication, training, and feedback through specialized and certified space-capable aggressors. It operates adversary space systems, develops new tactics, techniques and procedures to counter threats, and improves the US military space posture.

The squadron attempts to replicate enemy threats to space-based and space-enabled systems during tests and training exercises. By using Global Positioning System (GPS) and satellite communications jamming techniques, it provides Space Force, joint and coalition military personnel with an understanding of how to recognize, mitigate, counter and defeat these threats.

The 527th serves to know, teach and replicate a wide array of terrestrial and space threats to the U.S. Department of Defense's space enablers. The squadron trains the modern warfighter to operate in an environment where critical systems like GPS and SATCOM are interfered with or denied—preparing them for the current and future fights, and guaranteeing U.S. battlefield dominance well into the 21st century.

== History ==
=== World War II ===
Initially activated as the 312th Bombardment Squadron, a Douglas A-20 Havoc light bomber squadron in the southeast, trained under Third Air Force. Was reequipped as a Douglas A-24 Banshee fighter-bomber squadron and redesignated as the 527th Fighter-Bomber Squadron in August 1943.

Was deployed to Twelfth Air Force in North Africa in May 1943, being initially stationed in Algeria. Flying operations began 15 May from Médiouna Airfield, near Casablanca, French Morocco. Moved eastward supporting the Fifth Army with close air support missions. In the North African Campaign, the squadron engaged German positions in Tunisia.

In July, initial elements of the squadron moved to Sicily. From the Gela Airfield, begin flying combat missions, supporting the 1st Division of II Army Corps. On 27 August, the squadron provided air support for the first Allied landings on the European mainland at Salerno, Italy. On 10 September, three days after the invasion of Salerno, advance echelons of the squadron moved to Sele Airfield, near the beachhead. Enemy shelling of the beaches caused considerable difficulty during the move, and the 5527th did not fly its first missions until 15 September.

Moved north through Italy during the Italian Campaign, supported Allied forces by attacking enemy lines of communication, troop concentrations and supply areas. In April 1944 the squadron attacked the German Gustav Line. It also attacked rail and road targets and strafed German troop and supply columns during late spring.

The 527th was an active participant in Operation Strangle, the attempt to cut German supply lines prior to the Allied offensive aimed at rail and road networks, and attacking German troop and supply columns. While Strangle did not significantly cut into German supplies, it did disrupt enemy tactical mobility and was a major factor in the Allies' eventual breakthrough. During this period the 527th received Curtiss P-40 Warhawks to augment its aging A-36s, but the obsolescent P-40s were only a stopgap measure. The 527th welcomed its first Republic P-47 Thunderbolts a few weeks later, on 23 June.

Moved to Corsica in July 1944. From Poretta Airfield, the squadron flew bombing missions against coastal defenses in direct support of Operation Dragoon, the Allied invasion of southern France 15 Aug. 1944. Allied forces met little resistance as they moved inland twenty miles in the first twenty-four hours. Once the invasion was completed, the squadron moved back to northern Italy and continued its coastal basing by attacking enemy road and rail networks in northern Italy and, for the first time, flying regular escort missions with heavy bombers. The 527th also conducted armed reconnaissance against the enemy in the Po Valley region.

The 527th continued combat in northern Italy until February 1945, when it left the Mediterranean Theater and moved to Tantonville Airfield, France, in the Lorraine region, and operations shifted from targets in the Po Valley to those in southern Germany. The 527th's first mission to Germany – a cause of some excitement – was on 25 Feb. 1945, and by March most missions were flown into Germany against rail lines, roads, supply dumps, enemy installations and airfields. The squadron transferred from Tantonville to Braunshardt Airfield, near Darmstadt, Germany,

The 527th Fighter Squadron flew its final combat mission on 8 May 1945.

Just after the war, the squadron performed military occupation duty in Germany, with personnel demobilizing throughout the summer. The squadron's last personnel were sent back to the United States from AAF Station Schweinfurt, Germany, on 15 February 1946, with the squadron inactivated as an administrative unit in March.

=== Cold War ===
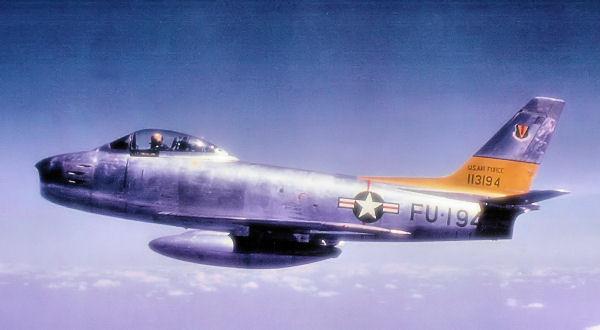
F-86Fs of the 527th Fighter-Bomber Squadron – 86th FBW – Landstuhl AB, West Germany

The squadron was reactivated in the postwar era 20 August 1946 at AAF Station Nordholz, Germany equipped with surplus P-47 Thunderbolts from storage depots in Europe. Over the next several years, the squadron underwent several redesignations and several station assignments in occupied Germany. In June 1948, the squadron was moved to Neubiberg Air Base, near Munich when tensions with the Soviet Union culminated in the Berlin Blockade. By 1948, it was obvious that the piston-engine Thunderbolts would be no match for Soviet jet fighters, and in early 1950 the squadron was re-equipped with Republic F-84E Thunderjets for air defense of the Munich area.

With the arrival of the jet age in Europe, USAFE wanted to move its units west of the Rhine River, as its bases in the Munich area were just a few minutes flying time from Soviet MiG-15 bases in Czechoslovakia. The squadron relocated to a new base, located west of the Rhine River near Kaiserslautern, West Germany in 1952. Landstuhl Air Base opened for operations on 5 August 1952, and the 527th Fighter Bomber Squadron arrived on 21 August.

In April 1953, the 527th completed its move to Landstuhl and was soon reequipped with the North American F-86F Sabre Jet, the first unit in USAFE to fly the most modern American fighter. The F-86F had been very successful as both a fighter and fighter bomber in the Korean War, and marked a quantum increase in the Wing's capabilities.

A year later the squadron was redesignated the 527th Fighter-Interceptor Squadron and assumed a new mission of air defense for the central European region. For this mission, the squadron was re-equipped with the rocket-armed North American F-86D Sabre interceptor which provided an all-weather capability

The 527th was inactivated on 8 Feb 1956 in a reorganization of air defense forces in West Germany by USAFE, with personnel and equipment transferring to the 461st Fighter-Day Squadron.

=== Fighter Aggressor Squadron ===
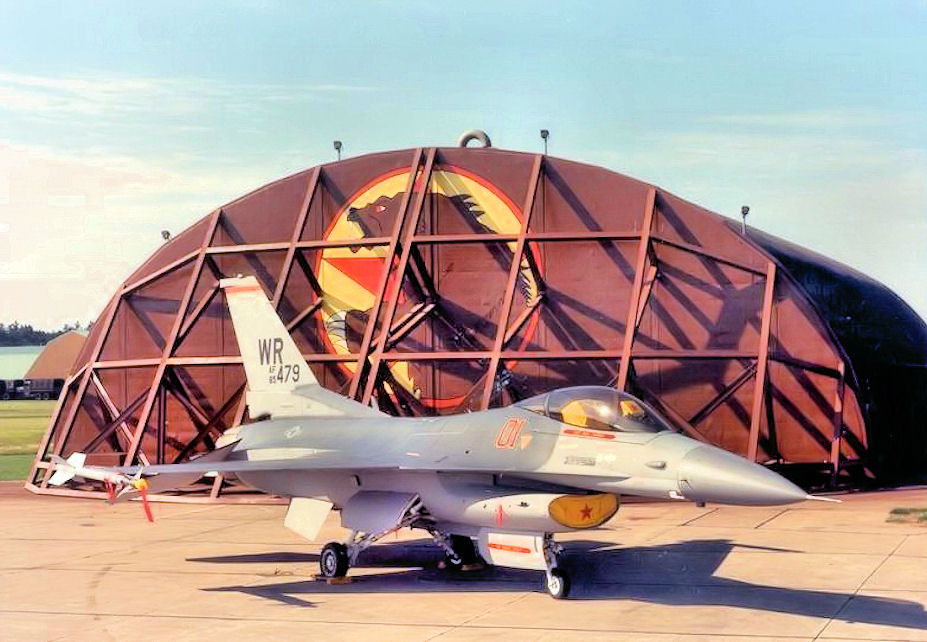
527th Aggressor Squadron F-16C Fighting Falcon (Note: Aircraft is General Dynamics F-16C Block 30A Fighting Falcon, serial 85-1479 at RAF Bentwaters, England in 1988. This was the first European based aggressor aircraft and it is shown parked in front of a hardened aircraft shelter adorned with a Russian bear and star. The 527th was the only USAFE squadron in the United Kingdom to be assigned the F-16.)

In April 1976, the squadron was reactivated at RAF Alconbury, England as the 527th Tactical Fighter Training and Aggressor Squadron, becoming the United States Air Forces in Europe's (USAFE) only aggressor squadron. The 527th began providing aggressor support to European-based combat units in September. Its mission was to train USAFE fighter pilots for air combat with Eastern Bloc adversaries using Dissimilar Air Combat Training (DACT).

The squadron was equipped with the Northrop F-5E Tiger II, being originally part of an order of aircraft destined for South Vietnam. The first batch of eight aircraft were air-freighted into Alconbury on 21 May 1976 on board a Lockheed C-5A Galaxy direct from the production facility at Palmdale, California. Eight more Tigers arrived on 14 June with the final batch of four following ten days later, on 24 June. These aircraft were also airfreighted on board a C-5A. The 527th was fully operational a few months later with the first DACT course commencing in October 1976

The aggressor F-5Es were painted in a variety of colourful camouflage schemes designed to mimic those in use by Warsaw Pact aircraft. Two-digit Soviet-style nose codes were applied to most aggressor aircraft. These coincided with the last two digits of the serial number. When there was duplication, three digits were used.

International conventions made it necessary for military aircraft to carry their national insignia, but the star-and-bar national insignia was reduced in size and relocated to a less-conspicuous position on the rear fuselage. The 527th's Aggressor aircraft were among the first to apply the star and bar in toned-down or stencil form, now standard on USAF aircraft.

The 527th Aggressors flew their aircraft in intense turns and other maneuvers as their mission involved intense combat fighter training, often involving high-G turns at supersonic speeds. The Aggressors trained both United States Air Force squadrons in Soviet fighter tactics, but deployed frequently to other NATO airfields, training pilots from Norway to Greece and Turkey, France, West Germany and the Low Countries in combat tactics.

After 12 years of intense flying, in 1988 the fleet of aggressor F-5Es were getting rather worn out as a result of sustained exposure to the rigours of air combat manoeuvring. There were restrictions placed on operations in which pilots were warned not to exceed a certain G-load. Some repair kits had to be devised to overcome these problems, and the estimated cost of repair of the entire fleet was beginning to exceed a billion dollars. In addition, with the appearance of a new generation of Soviet fighters, it became apparent that F-5Es could no longer adequately mimic Warsaw Pact threats.

It was decided to re-equip the squadron with General Dynamics F-16C Fighting Falcons and move the squadron to RAF Bentwaters. In return, the Fairchild Republic A-10 Thunderbolt II's at Bentwaters would move to Alconbury and give the 10th Tactical Fighter Wing a new close air support mission.

After the 527th was reassigned, eight of the lowest-hour F-5E's were transferred to the United States Navy for TOPGUN aggressor training at Naval Air Station Miramar, California in July 1988. The remainder were sent to storage at RAF Kemble for refurbishing. From there they were sold under the foreign military assistance program to Morocco and Tunisia in October 1989. One F-5E was thought to be retained at Alconbury for static display as a gate guard. In reality this is a plastic/fiberglass model with an authentic windscreen and canopy.

The 527th flew its last F-5E sortie from Alconbury on 22 June 1988 and personnel and equipment was moved to RAF Bentwaters. The first two of an intended complement of eighteen F-16Cs arrived at Bentwaters on 14 June 1988. These were single examples taken from the 52d Tactical Fighter Wing at Spangdahlem Air Base, West Germany and the 86th Tactical Fighter Wing at Ramstein Air Base. The first four months at Bentwaters were dedicated to pilot conversion for the new aircraft.

The 527th AS resumed their aggressor role in November 1988 when six McDonnell Douglas F-15C Eagles from the 36th Tactical Fighter Wing at Bitburg Air Base, Germany arrived at Bentwaters for the start of a three-week DACT course. The 527th's complement of aircraft had reached twelve on 16 January 1989 when one more F-16C was delivered from Spangdahlem.

In 1989 with the Fall of the Berlin Wall and the subsequent collapse of the Warsaw Pact and a reduction of defense spending, the decision was made to terminate the entire USAF aggressor program. In November 1989 the squadron began disposing of its F-16Cs in preparation for inactivation the following year. The first two aircraft to leave were flown to Spangdahlem on 29 November 1989. The 527th had reassigned its entire fleet of 12 aircraft by mid-1990 and was inactivated on 30 September 1990. It was to be the only F-16 unit ever to be based in the United Kingdom.

=== Space Aggressor Squadron ===
The 527th was not activated again until 29 September 2000 when it became the 527th Space Aggressor Squadron. On 14 April 2006 the squadron moved from under Air Force Space Command to Air Combat Command. In 2006 it began reporting to the 57th Adversary Tactics Group of the 57th Wing.

On 24 July 2020 the 527th Aggressor Squadron was transferred to the United States Space Force.

== Lineage ==
- Constituted as the 312th Bombardment Squadron (Light) on 13 January 1942

Activated on 10 February 1942
Redesignated 312th Bombardment Squadron (Dive) on 3 September 1942
Redesignated 527th Fighter-Bomber Squadron on 23 August 1943
Redesignated 527th Fighter Squadron, Single Engine on 30 May 1944
Inactivated on 31 March 1946

- Activated on 20 August 1946

Redesignated: 527th Fighter-Bomber Squadron on 20 January 1950
Redesignated: 527th Fighter-Day Squadron on 8 October 1954
Inactivated on 8 February 1956

- Redesignated 527th Tactical Fighter Training Aggressor Squadron on 29 September 1975

Activated on 1 April 1976
Redesignated 527th Aggressor Squadron on 15 April 1983
Inactivated on 30 September 1990

- Redesignated 527th Space Aggressor Squadron on 29 September 2000

Activated on 23 October 2000

=== Assignments ===
- 86th Bombardment Group (later 86th Fighter-Bomber Group, 86th Fighter Group), 10 February 1942 – 31 March 1946
- 86th Fighter Group, 20 August 1946
- United States Air Forces in Europe, 15 May 1947
- Tactical Air Command, 25 June 1947
- United States Air Forces in Europe, 30 December 1947
- 86th Fighter Group (later 86th Fighter-Bomber Group, 86th Fighter-Interceptor Group), 25 January 1948 – 8 February 1956
- 10th Tactical Reconnaissance Wing (later 10th Tactical Fighter Wing), 1 April 1976
- 81st Tactical Fighter Wing, 14 July 1988 – 30 September 1990
- Space Warfare Center, 23 October 2000
- 57th Adversary Tactics Group, 14 April 2006 – 24 July 2020
- Space Training and Readiness Delta (Provisional), 24 July 2020 – 22 August 2021
- Space Delta 11, 23 August 2021 – present

=== Stations ===
- Will Rogers Field, Oklahoma, 10 February 1942
- Hunter Field, Georgia, 15 June 1942
- Key Field, Mississippi, c. 7 August 1942 – 19 March 1943
- Oran Es Sénia Airport, Algeria, 11 May 1943
- Marnia Airfield, French Morocco, 15 May 1943
- Tafaraoui Airfield, Algeria, 11 June 1943
- Korba Airfield, Tunisia, 1 July 1943
- Gela West Landing Ground, Sicily, Italy, 20 July 1943
- Barcelona Landing Ground, Sicily, Italy, 27 August 1943
- Sele Airfield, Italy, c. 16 September 1943
- Serretella Airfield, Italy, c. 11 October 1943
- Pomigliano Airfield, Italy, c. 20 October 1943
- Marcianise Airfield, Italy, 30 April 1944
- Ciampino Airport, Italy, 12 June 1944
- Orbetello Airfield, Italy, c. 19 June 1944
- Poretta Airfield, Corsica, France, c. 12 July 1944
- Grosseto Airfield, Italy, c. 17 September 1944
- Pisa Airport, Italy, c. 26 October 1944
- Tatonville Airfield (Y-1), France, c. 23 February 1945
- Braunshardt Airfield (Y-72), Germany, 17 April 1945
- AAF Station Schweinfurt (R-25), Germany, 20 September 1945 – 15 February 1946
- Bolling Field, District of Columbia, 15 February–31 March 1946
- AAF Station Nordholz, Germany, 20 August 1946
- AAF Station Lechfeld, Germany, c. 1 December 1946
- AAF Station Bad Kissingen, Germany, 5 March–25 June 1947
- Langley Field, Virginia, 25 June–30 December 1947
- Neubiberg Air Base, Germany, 30 December 1947
- Landstuhl Air Base, Germany, 1 August 1952 – 8 February 1956
- RAF Alconbury, England, 1 April 1976
- RAF Bentwaters, England, 14 July 1988 – 30 September 1990
- Schriever Space Force Base, CO, 23 October 2000 – present

=== Aircraft ===
- Douglas A-20 Havoc, 1942
- Douglas A-24 Banshee, 1942
- Vultee A-31 Vengeance, 1942
- North American A-36 Apache, 1942–1944
- Curtiss P-40 Warhawk, 1944
- Republic P-47 (later F-47) Thunderbolt, 1944–1946, 1946–1947, 1948–1950
- Republic F-84 Thunderjet, 1950–1953
- North American F-86 Sabre, 1953–1956
- Northrop F-5 Tiger II, 1976–1988
- General Dynamics F-16 Fighting Falcon, 1988–1990

== List of commanders ==
- Lt Col Conrad "Rad" Widman, 23 October 2000 – July 2002
- Lt Col Scott Bonzer, 22 June 2012 – 6 June 2014
- Lt Col Kyle J. Pumroy, 6 June 2014 – 2 June 2016
- Lt Col Anibal Rodriguez, 2 June 2016
- Lt Col Jason Adams, ~2018
- Lt Col Jennifer Hodges, July 2020 - July 2022
- Lt Col Christopher Adams, 15 July 2022 - 1 July 2024
- Lt Col Shawn "Happy" Green, 1 July 2024 - 15 June 2026
- Lt Col Keturah "KT" Onukwuli, 15 June 2026 - present
