= 526th Fighter Squadron =

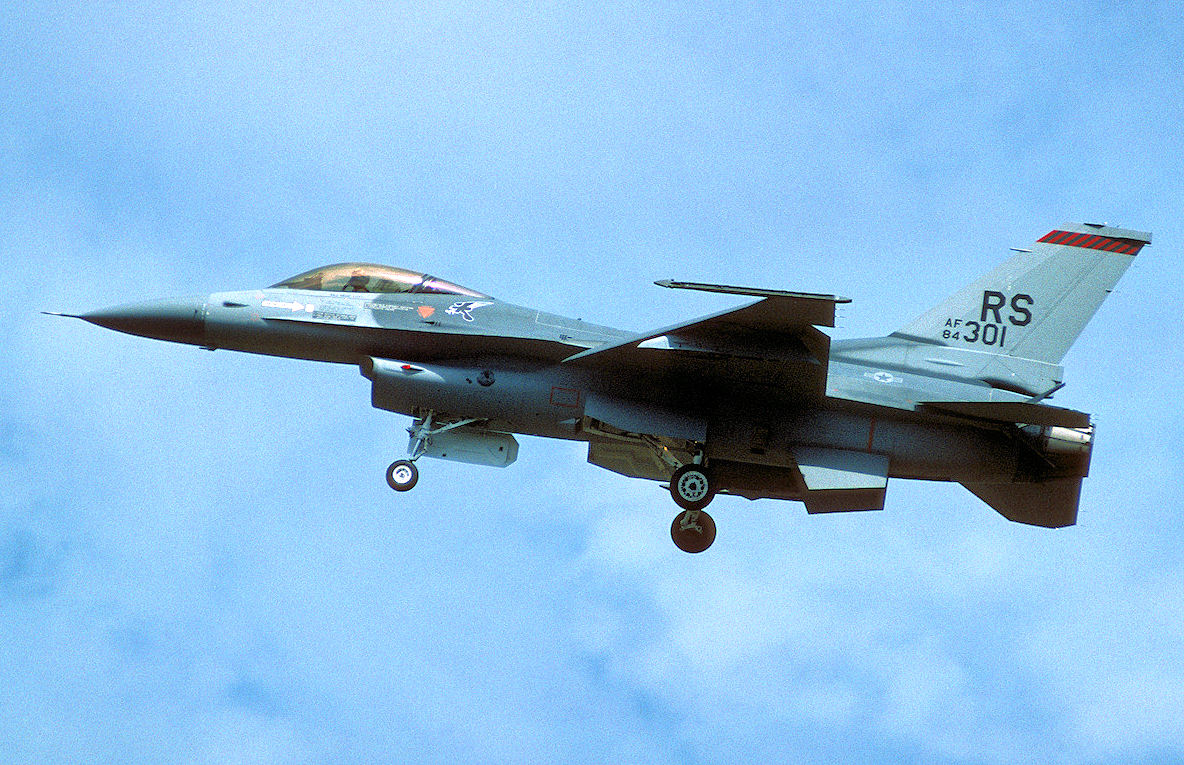
- 526th F-16 Fighting Falcon (Note: Aircraft is General Dynamics F-16C Block 25E, serial 84-0301, taken about 1992.)
- Active: 1942–1946; 1946–1994
- Country: United States
- Branch: United States Air Force
- Role: Fighter
- Engagements: Mediterranean Theater of Operations
- Decorations: Distinguished Unit Citation; Air Force Outstanding Unit Award

Insignia
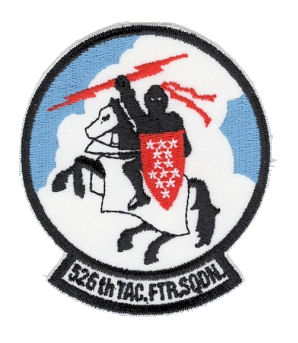
- Patch with 526th Fighter Squadron emblem (Note: Approved 6 September 1955. Description: On a medium blue disc, with white edge and black border, a cloud formation of the second [color], surmounted by a silhouetted black knight, mounted on a black war horse rampant, the horse caparisoned in white; the knight's right arm raised forward and grasping a bolt of lightning red; holding with his left arm a shield of the last [color], charged with thirteen white stars, spaced five, two, and six; two red streamers, flying from the top of the knight's mailed hood, the slots for his eyes indicated in white.)

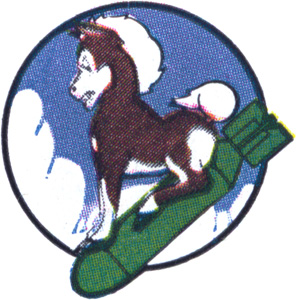
- 526th Fighter-Bomber Squadron emblem (World War II)

The 526th Fighter Squadron is an inactive United States Air Force unit. Its last assignment was with the 86th Operations Group at Ramstein Air Base, Germany, where it was inactivated on 1 July 1994.

The squadron was first activated as the 310th Bombardment Squadron in February 1942. After training in the United States, it was deployed to the Mediterranean Theater of Operations, where it became the 526th Fighter-Bomber Squadron and engaged in combat until the spring of 1945, earning two Distinguished Unit Citations. After VE Day, the squadron became part of the occupation forces in Germany. Briefly inactivated in 1946, it returned to Germany a few months later.

During the Cold War, the squadron served in the fighter bomber role as the 526th Fighter-Bomber Squadron and in the air defense role as the 526th Fighter-Interceptor Squadron. It became the 526th Tactical Fighter Squadron in 1968. The squadron again saw combat service in the Gulf War before inactivating in July 1994.

== History ==
=== World War II ===
The squadron originally activated on 10 February 1942 at Will Rogers Field, Oklahoma as the 310th Bombardment Squadron (Light), one of the four squadrons of the 86th Bombardment Group. In August 1942, it moved to Key Field, Mississippi, where it began training with the Douglas A-20 Havoc. In August, the squadron became a dive bomber unit. Before the end of 1942, the squadron transitioned briefly to Vultee A-31 Vengeance and then to North American A-36 Apache dive bombers.

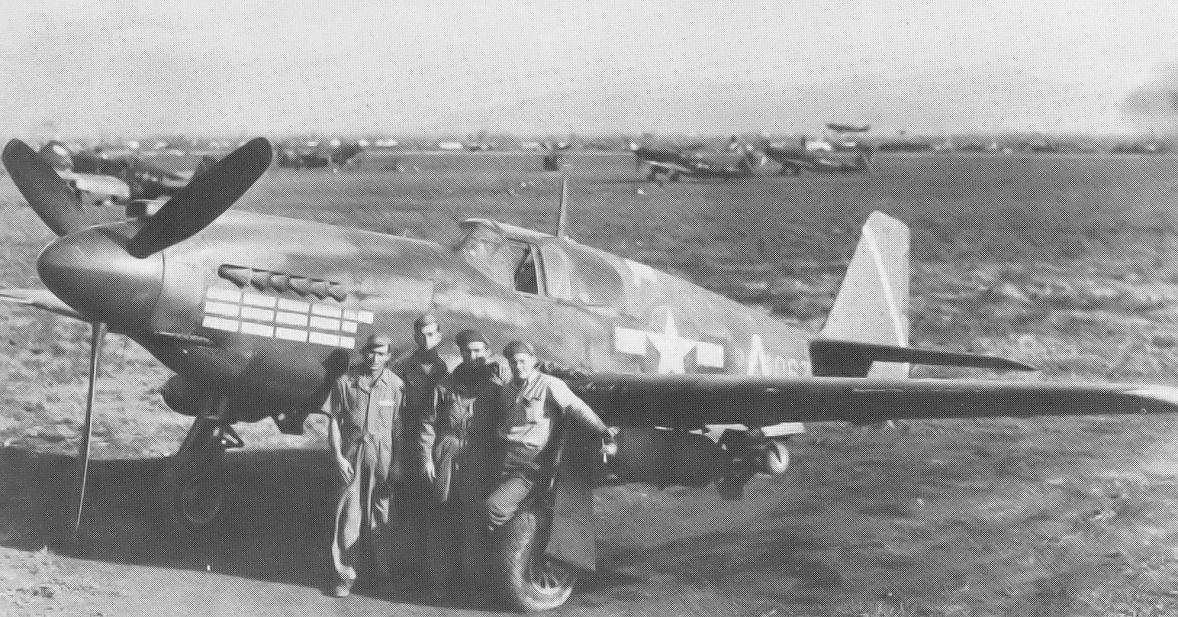
86th Group A-36 in north Africa

The squadron boarded the SS John Ericsson in April 1943. In early May, the squadron arrived at La Senia Airfield, Algeria. The 310th trained at bases in French Morocco and moved to Tafaraoui Airfield, Algeria on 11 June 1943, entering combat on 6 July 1943. Following Operation Husky, the invasion of Sicily, the squadron moved to Gela Airfield, Sicily on 20 July 1943, and to Barcellona Landing Ground, Sicily, on 1 September 1943, to support Allied operations, engaging primarily in close air support, moving forward as the battle line on the ground changed. In August 1943, the squadron was redesignated the 526th Fighter-Bomber Squadron.

The squadron also flew patrols and interdiction missions, attacking convoys, trains, troop columns, bridges and rail lines, and supply dumps and columns. It was redesignated the 526th Fighter-Bomber Squadron on 23 August 1943. While in Italy, the 525th moved several more times while participating in the Rome-Arno campaign. The 526th provided air support to Allied ground forces in Operation Avalanche, the invasion of Italy near Salerno, and the Battle of Monte Cassino, during the advance on Rome in the first six months of 1944.

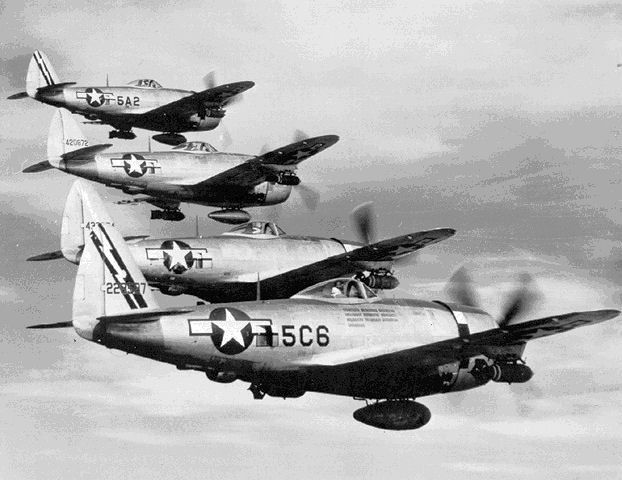
86th Group P-47 Thunderbolts

In 1944, the 526th transitioned to the Republic P-47 Thunderbolt and was redesignated the 526th Fighter Squadron on 30 May 1944. On 25 May, the squadron repeatedly dived through intense flak to destroy enemy vehicles and troop positions when the Wehrmacht tried to stop the advance of Allied forces short of Rome. This action earned the squadron its first Distinguished Unit Citation (DUC). In August 1944, the squadron provided support for Operation Dragoon, the invasion of southern France. Until the spring of 1945, the squadron concentrated on Operation Strangle, the effort to choke off supplies for Axis military in northern Italy through air interdiction.

In February 1945, the squadron moved to Tatonville Airfield, France, to fly missions against Germany. Two months later it moved to Braunshardt Airfield, Germany on 18 April 1945. On 20 April, it attacked airfields and convoys in northern Germany, disorganizing enemy efforts to withdraw from the area. For this action, the squadron received a second DUC. The squadron flew its last combat mission on 8 May 1945. Although the squadron was primarily engaged in ground attack missions during the war, it received credit for the destruction of three enemy aircraft. Postwar, the headquarters moved to AAF Station Schweinfurt on 23 October 1945, becoming nonoperational. but remaining part of the American occupation forces until February 1946, when it moved on paper to Bolling Field, District of Columbia, where it was inactivated on 31 March 1946.

=== Cold War ===
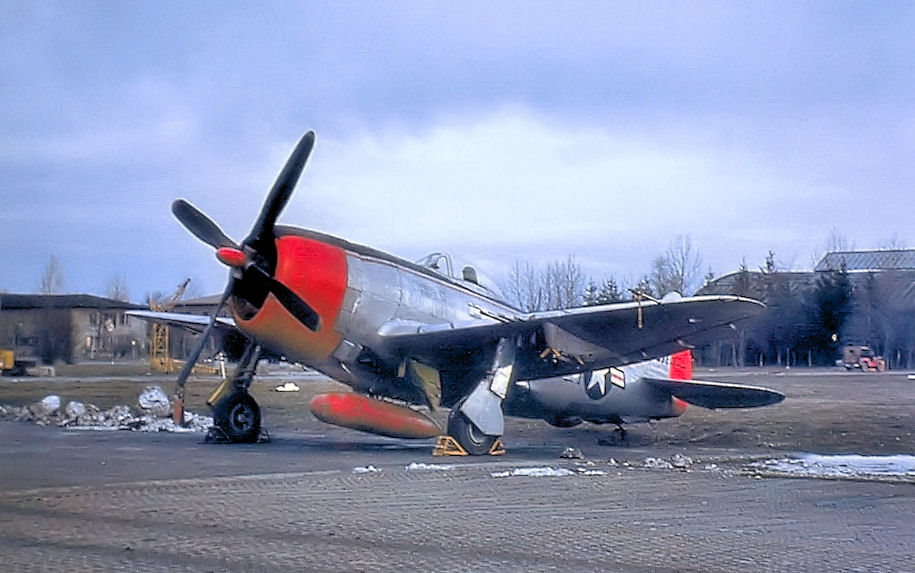
526th F-47 Thunderbolt, 1948

The squadron was reactivated in the occupation forces on 20 August 1946, at AAF Station Nordholz, Germany, where it took over the personnel and P-47 Thunderbolts of the 513th Fighter Squadron, which was simultaneously inactivated. The squadron made two moves in Germany that year before settling at Neubiberg Air Force Base on 12 June 1947. The squadron's initial mission was to provide air defense for the American Zone of Occupation in Germany. As the Berlin Airlift grew in size, the squadron was tasked with providing protection for cargo flights into Berlin. The squadron participated in tactical exercises in Europe and frequently deployed to Wheelus Field for gunnery training. On 20 January 1950, the squadron was redesignated the 526th Fighter-Bomber Squadron. In October 1950, the squadron transitioned to its first jet aircraft, the Republic F-84E Thunderjet.

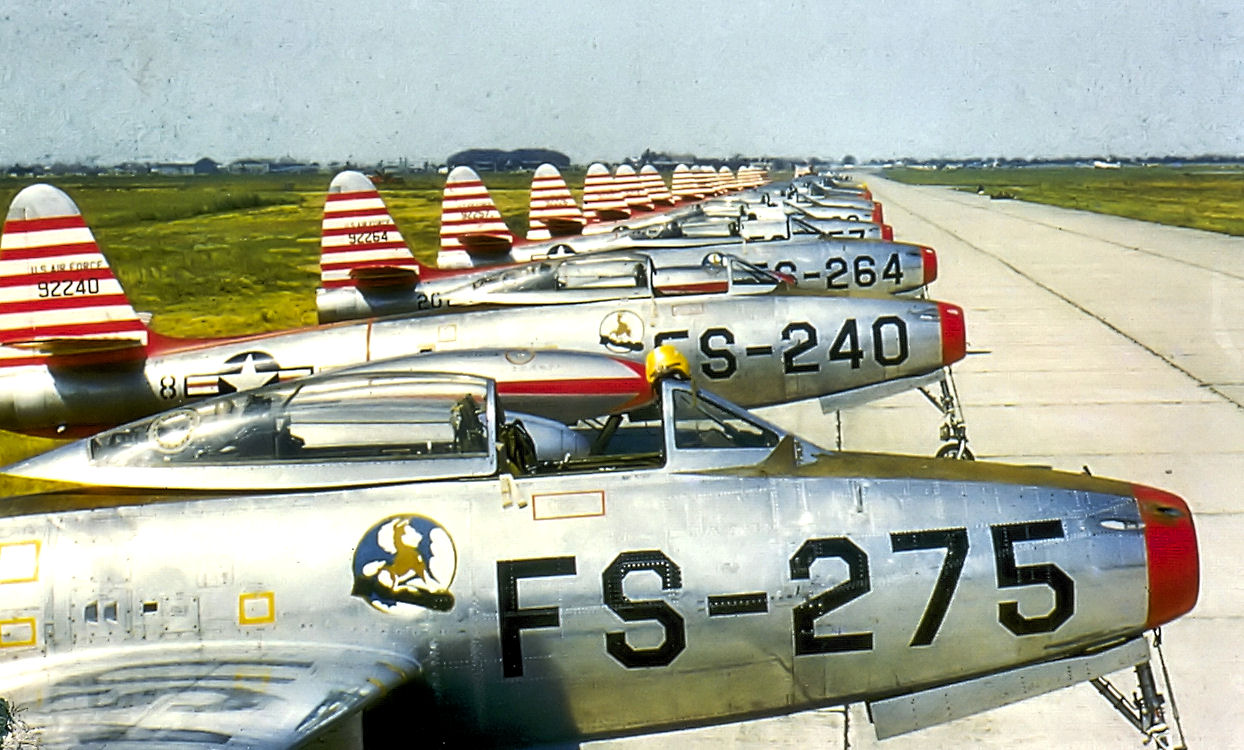
526th F-84E Thunderjets in 1951, probably at Neubiberg AB

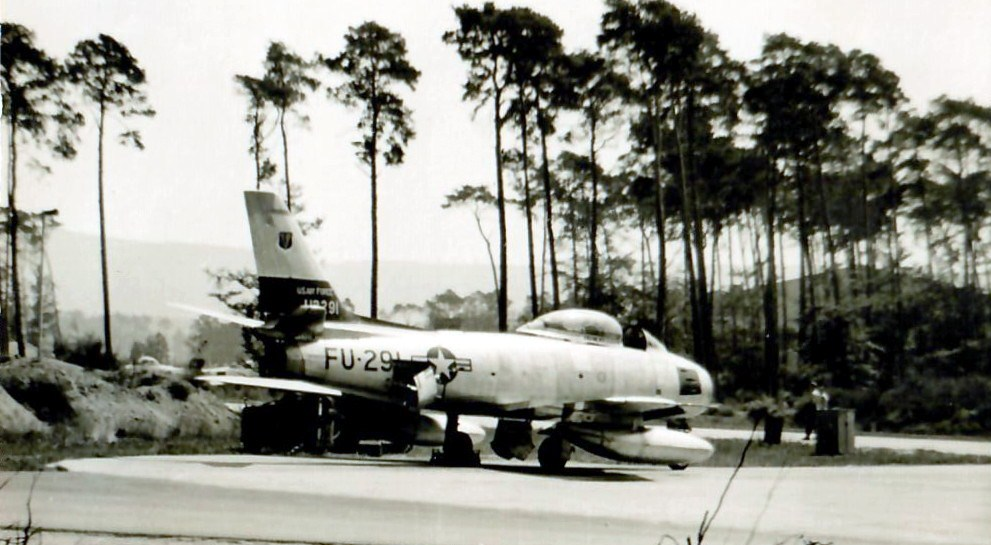
Squadron F-86F Sabre, probably at Landstuhl AB, c. 1953

The 525th moved to Landstuhl Air Base, Germany on 20 November 1952, where it transitioned to the North American F-86 Sabre the following year. The 525th first flew the F-86F Sabre fighter-bomber in April 1953. The following year, the squadron transitioned to the F-86D, equipped with airborne intercept radar and armed with Folding-Fin Aerial Rockets. The F-86D was Europe's first all-weather fighter-interceptor. Flying the F-86D in the air defense role, the 526th was redesignated the 526th Fighter-Interceptor Squadron on 9 August 1954.

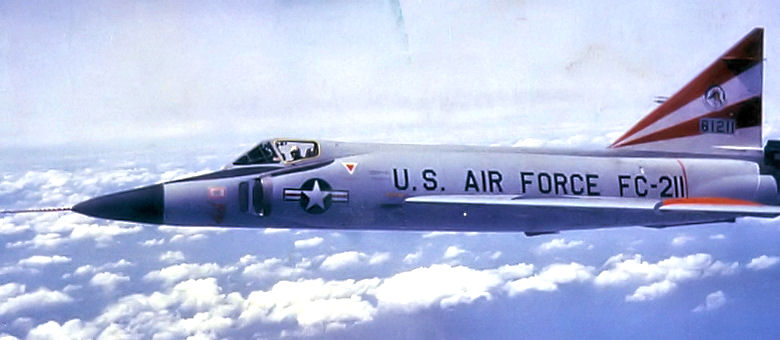
526th F-102 Delta Dagger (Note: Aircraft is Convair F-102A Delta Dagger, serial 56-1211, taken about 1965.)

In June 1960, the squadron began to re-equip with the Convair F-102 Delta Dagger Although its pilots had completed transition training by September, combat crew training was moveed to Spain due to adverse weather in Germany. The squadron began standing alert with its F-102s in November. However, it was not until 1964, when the European air defense system upgraded from a manual to an automated system that full advantage could be taken of the F-102's data link capability. Starting in 1963, two of the squadron's "Deuces" were dedicated to implementing this upgrade. In 1966, with the withdrawal of France from NATO, the 26th Tactical Reconnaissance Wing moved to Ramstein as the host unit. When the 86th Air Division was inactivated in November 1968, the squadron was reassigned to the 26th Wing. The squadron flew USAFE's last operational F-102 sortie on 1 April 1970, and two weeks later began ferrying its planes back to the United States. The squadron was redesignated the 526th Tactical Fighter Squadron and began converting to the McDonnell F-4E Phantom II.

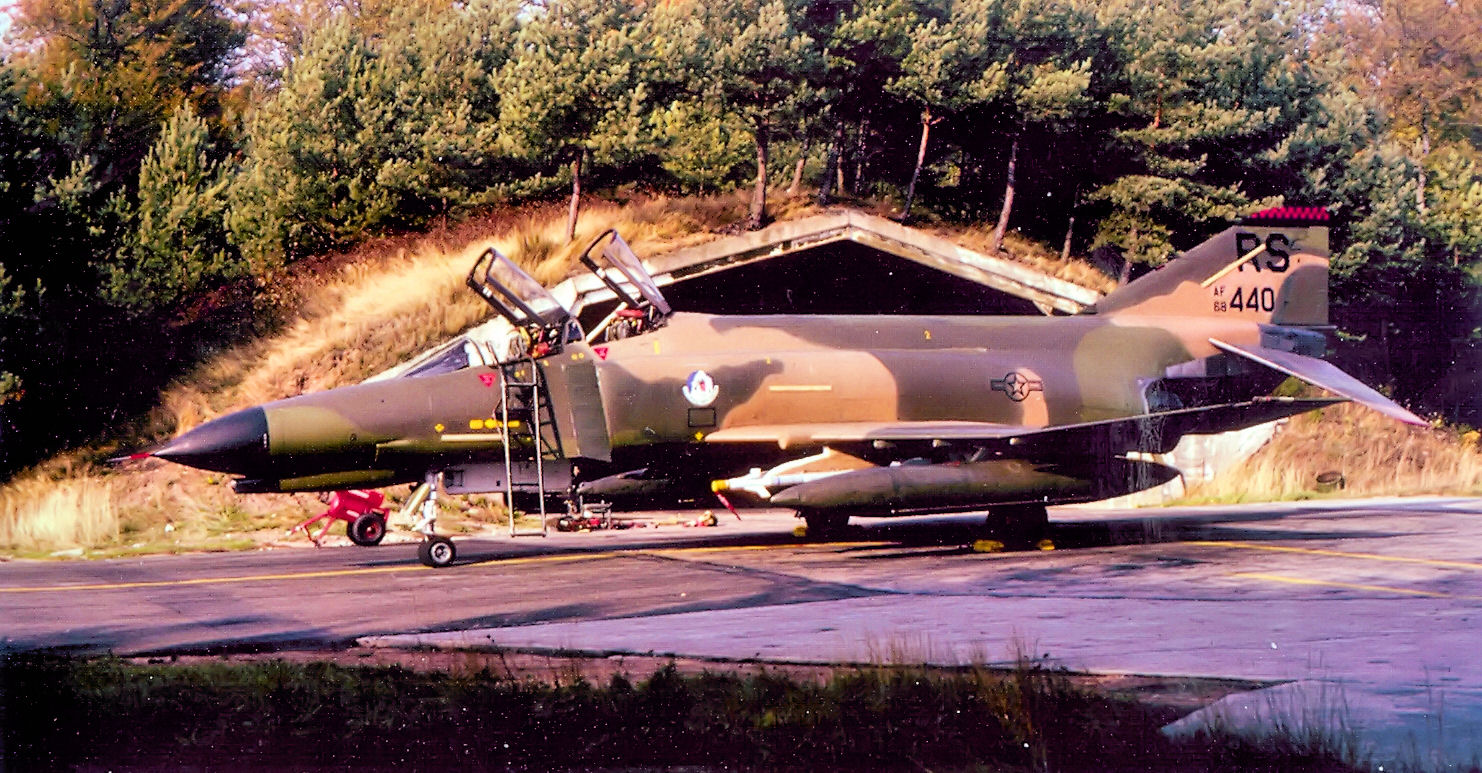
526th F-4E Phantom II 68-0440 at Ramstein AB on October 28, 1983. Photo by Scott R Wilson (Note: Aircraft is McDonnell Douglas F-4E Phantom II, serial 68-0440, photo taken by Scott R Wilson late afternoon on October 28, 1983 at Ramstein AB, West Germany in the 526 TFS Restricted Area. 440 was prepped for its next sortie and was waiting for the crew to step to the jet.)

The 26th Tactical Reconnaissance Wing at Ramstein Air Base consisted primarily of fighter units, while the 86th Tactical Fighter Wing at Zweibrücken Air Base controlled reconnaissance units. In January 1973, as part of Operation Creek Action, USAFE switched the bases of the two wing headquarters, and the 526th was again assigned to the 86th Wing.

In April 1981, a squadron F-4E deployed to Florida to participate in a weapons systems evaluation program. During an exercise over the Gulf of Mexico, the plane was mistakenly shot down by an AIM-9 Sidewinder fired by another fighter participating in the exercise. The crew successfully ejected and was soon rescued. The squadron continued to operate the F-4E until it upgraded to General Dynamics F-16 Fighting Falcons 1985. It deployed aircraft and personnel for Operation Northern Watch, occasionally attacking surface to air missile sites in Iraq.

=== Air war in Bosnia and inactivation ===
As the Bosnia War intensified, the United Nations declared a no fly zone over Bosnia. This was enforced by NATO in Operation Deny Flight. The squadron deployed aircraft to Aviano Air Base, Italy to participate in the operation. On 28 February 1994, two squadron F-16Cs patrolling over Mostar were informed that Serbian Soko J-21 Jastrebs were operating near Banja Luka in contravention of the no fly zone. Squadron aircraft shot down four of the J-21s, with one squadron pilot scoring three victories. This was the first air combat engagement in NATO history.

The 86th Wing had added an airlift mission to its fighter mission in 1992. In 1994 the 86th Wing converted to a wing devoted to airlift, and gradually assumed the theater airlift mission previously performed by the 435th Airlift Wing at Rhein Main Air Base, Germany, which was inactivated the following year. With the influx of C-130 personnel, the 526th was inactivated on 1 October 1994, with its aircraft and most of its personnel moving to Aviano and transferring to the 510th or 555th Fighter Squadrons there.

== Lineage ==
- Constituted as the 310th Bombardment Squadron (Light) on 13 January 1942

Activated on 10 February 1942
Redesignated 310th Bombardment Squadron (Dive) on 3 September 1942
Redesignated 526th Fighter-Bomber Squadron on 23 August 1943
Redesignated 526th Fighter Squadron on 30 May 1944
Inactivated on 31 March 1946

- Activated on 20 August 1946

Redesignated 526th Fighter-Bomber Squadron on 20 January 1950
Redesignated 526th Fighter-Interceptor Squadron on 9 August 1954
Redesignated 526th Tactical Fighter Squadron on 1 November 1968
Redesignated 526th Fighter Squadron on 1 May 1991
Inactivated on 1 July 1994

=== Assignments ===
- 86th Bombardment Group (later 86th Fighter-Bomber Group, 86th Fighter Group), 10 February 1942 – 31 March 1946
- 86th Fighter Group (later 86th Composite Group, 86th Fighter Group, 86th Fighter-Bomber Group, 86th Fighter-Interceptor Group), 20 August 1946 (attached to 86th Fighter-Interceptor Wing, 22 May 1954 – 7 October 1955, after 10 August 1956) (Note: Maurer does not reflect these attachments. Maurer, Combat Squadrons, pp. 631-32. However, the group was not operational during these periods.)
- 86th Fighter-Interceptor Wing (later 86th Air Division), 8 March 1958 (Note: Maurer lists a reassignment from the 86th Fighter-Interceptor Wing to the 86th Air Division on 18 November 1960. However, this was not a reassignment, the 86th was redesignated on that date. Ravenstein, p. 120)
- 26th Tactical Reconnaissance Wing, 1 November 1968
- 86th Tactical Fighter Wing, 31 January 1973
- 86th Tactical Fighter Group, 22 September 1975
- 86th Tactical Fighter Wing, 14 June 1985
- 86th Operations Group, 1 May 1991 – 1 July 1994

=== Stations ===
- Will Rogers Field, Oklahoma, 10 February 1942
- Hunter Field, Georgia, 15 June 1942
- Key Field, Mississippi, 7 August 1942 – 19 March 1943
- La Senia Airfield, Algeria, 11 May 1943
- Marnia Airfield, French Morocco, 15 May 1943
- Tafaraoui Airfield, Algeria, 11 June 1943
- Korba Airfield, Tunisia, c. 30 June 1943
- Gela Airfield, Sicily, Italy, 20 July 1943
- Barcellona Landing Ground, Sicily, Italy, 1 September 1943
- Sele Airfield, Italy, c. 15 September 1943
- Serretella Airfield, Italy, c. 5 October 1943
- Pomigliano Airfield, Italy, c. 12 October 1943
- Marcianise Airfield Italy, 30 April 1944
- Rome Ciampino Airport, Italy, c. 11 June 1944
- Poretta Airfield, Corsica, France, 11 July 1944
- Grosseto Airfield, Italy, 16 September 1944
- Pisa Airport, Italy, c. 23 October 1944
- Tatonville Airfield (Y-1), France, c. 21 February 1945
- Braunshardt Airfield (Y-72), Germany, c. 16 April 1945
- AAF Station Schweinfurt (R-25), Germany, 25 September 1945 – 15 February 1946
- Bolling Field, District of Columbia, 15 February – 31 March 1946
- AAF Station Nordholz, Germany, 20 August 1946
- AAF Station Lechfeld, Germany c. 1 December 1946
- AAF Station Bad Kissingen, Germany, c. 6 March 1947
- AAF Station Neubiberg (later Neubiberg Air Force Base, Neubiberg Air Base), Germany, c. 12 June 1947
- Landstuhl Air Base (later Ramstein-Landstuhl Air Base, Ramstein Air Base), Germany, 1 August 1952 – 1 July 1994

=== Aircraft ===
- Douglas A-20 Havoc, 1942
- Douglas A-24 Banshee, 1942
- North American A-36 Apache, 1942–1944
- Curtiss P-40 Warhawk, 1944
- Republic P-47 Thunderbolt, 1944–1946, 1946–1950
- F-84 Thunderjet, 1950–1953
- North American F-86 Sabre, 1953–1960
- Convair F-102 Delta Dagger, 1960–1970
- McDonnell F-4 Phantom II, 1970–1986
- General Dynamics F-16 Fighting Falcon, 1986–1994
