= 86th Operations Group =

86th Operations Group

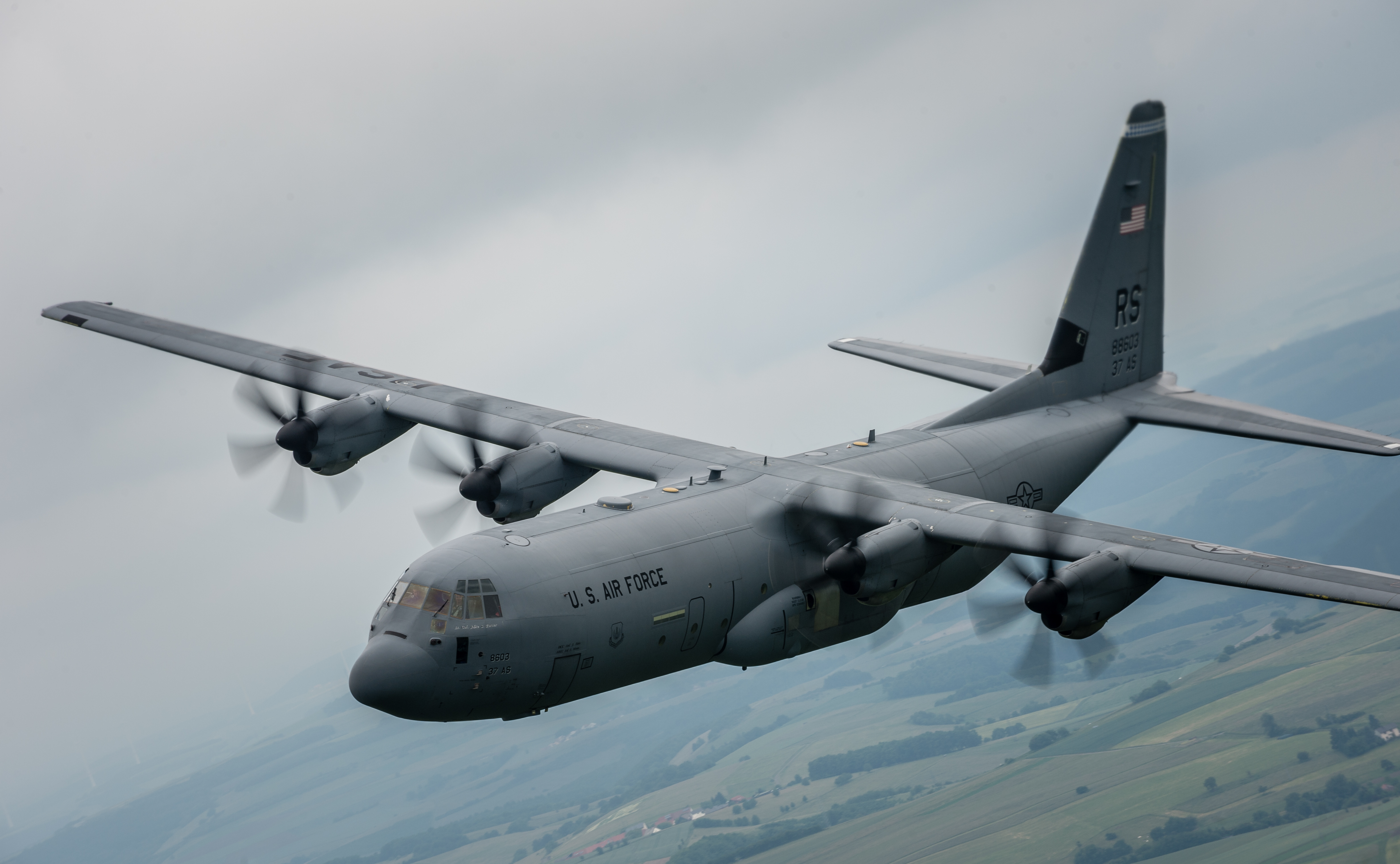
- A C-130J of the 37th Airlift Squadron over Germany
- Active: 1942–1958; 1975–1985; 1991–present
- Country: United States
- Branch: United States Air Force
- Type: Operations Group
- Role: Airlift
- Part of: United States Air Forces in Europe - Air Forces Africa: Third Air Force; 86th Airlift Wing
- Garrison/HQ: Ramstein Air Base, Germany
- Motto: Virtus Perdurat (Latin for 'Courage Will Endure')
- Engagements: World War II (EAME Theater): Sicily Campaign; Naples-Foggia Campaign; Anzio Campaign; Rome-Arno Campaign; Southern France Campaign; North Apennines Campaign; Rhineland Campaign; Central Europe Campaign; Air Combat, EAME Theater; Kosovo Campaign Armed Forces Expeditionary: Operation Northern Watch; Operation Southern Watch; Global war on terrorism Expeditionary: Operation Enduring Freedom; Operation Iraqi Freedom

- Decorations: Distinguished Unit Citation: Italy, 25 May 1944; Germany, 20 Apr 1945; Air Force Outstanding Unit Award with Combat "V" Device; 15 Jan 2004-31 Oct 2005; Air Force Outstanding Unit Award (10x)

Insignia
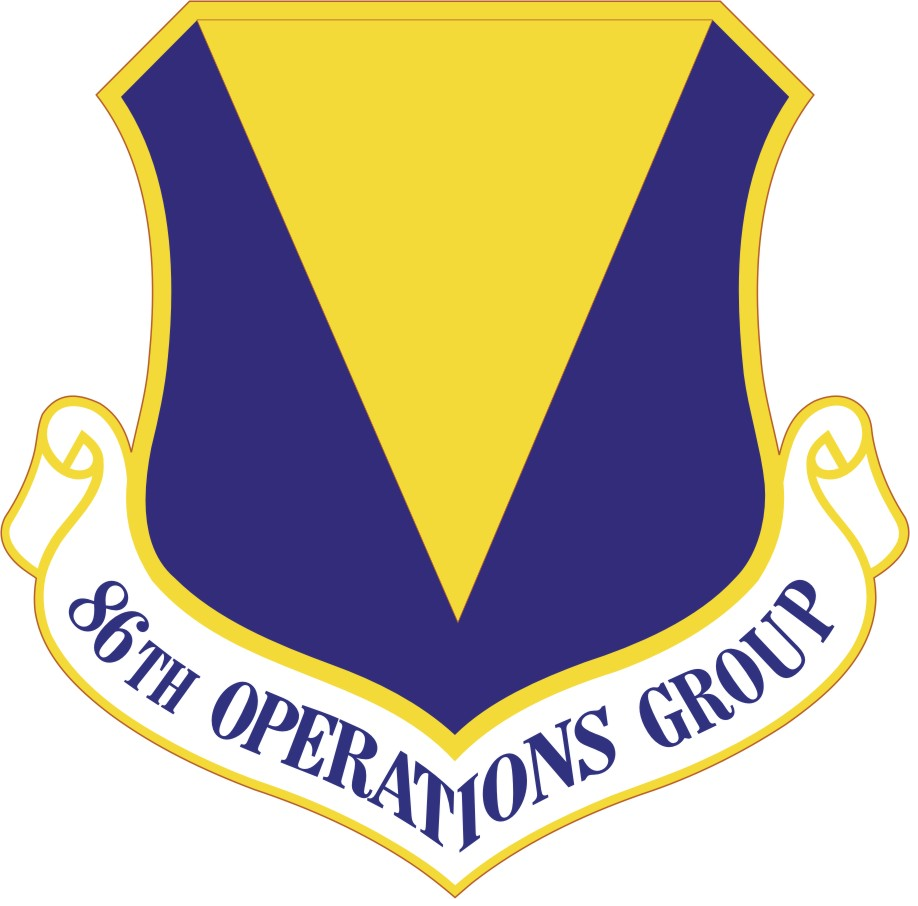
- 86th Operations Group Emblem (Note: While assigned to the 86th Wing, the group uses the wing emblem with the group designation on the scroll. AF Instruction 84-105, Organizational Lineage, Honors and History, 27 April 2017, paragraph 3.3.3.)

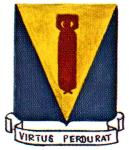
- 86th Bombardment Group emblem (Note: Approved 17 October 1942. Description: Azure on a pile or a drop bomb palewise gules.)

The 86th Operations Group (86 OG) is the flying operational component of the 86th Airlift Wing, United States Air Force. The group is stationed at Ramstein Air Base, Germany.

The mission of the 86 OG (Tail Code: RS) is to conduct airlift, airdrop and aeromedical evacuation as well as VIP transport operations flying the C-21A, C-37A, and C-130J aircraft.

== Overview ==
As the 86th Airlift Wing's main operational component, the group provides theater airlift, distinguished visitor transport and aeromedical evacuation capability by maintaining readiness to deploy and employ all assets across the spectrum of air combat support missions. Its subordinate squadrons maintain and fly C-21A, C-37A and C-130J type aircraft.

== Assigned Units ==
- 37th Airlift Squadron (C-130J)
- 76th Airlift Squadron (C-21A, C-37A)
- 86th Aeromedical Evacuation Squadron
- 86th Operational Support Squadron
- 424th Air Base Squadron

Stationed at: Chièvres Air Base, Belgium

== History ==
For additional history and lineage, see 86th Airlift Wing and 86th Air Division

=== World War II ===
Activated on 10 February 1942, as the 86th Fighter Group at Will Rogers Field, near Oklahoma City, Oklahoma with a cadre of five officers and 163 enlisted men. The unit made several moves before settling at Key Field in Meridian, Mississippi, where it began training on A-20 and DB-7 Havoc. In September 1942, the 86th was redesignated a dive-bomber unit and received A-24 Banshee, the Army Air Forces version of the US Navy's highly successful SBD Dauntless, and A-31 Vengeance aircraft, transferring its A-20s and DB-7s to the 27th and 47th Light Bomber Groups.

The new aircraft did not improve the 86th's combat capability. The Allies had found land-based dive bombers unsatisfactory for combat in Europe after the initial days of the war, so the A-24 and A-31 were as replaced as rapidly as possible. The transition began 20 November 1942, with the arrival of the first A-36 Apache (also christened the Apache or Invader), one of the finest ground-attack aircraft in the world at the time and a version of the P-51A Mustang.

After completing training, in March 1943 the 86th and its three squadrons, the 309th, 310th, and 312th Bombardment Squadrons (Light) embarked from Staten Island 29 April and sailed to Algeria, arriving at Mers El Khebir, a former French naval base at Oran, in May. Flying operations began 15 May from Médiouna Airfield, near Casablanca, French Morocco. The 86th and its squadrons then began a series of moves around the theater which would eventually lead to Sicily, Italy; Corsica, France; and Germany.

In the North African Campaign, the 86th engaged primarily in close support of ground forces, beginning in early July against German positions in Tunisia. The 309th Squadron flew the group's first combat mission on 2 July 1943 from Trafaroui Air Base, Algeria, and the group's other squadrons began combat operations on 6 July with attacks against Cap Bon, Tunis.

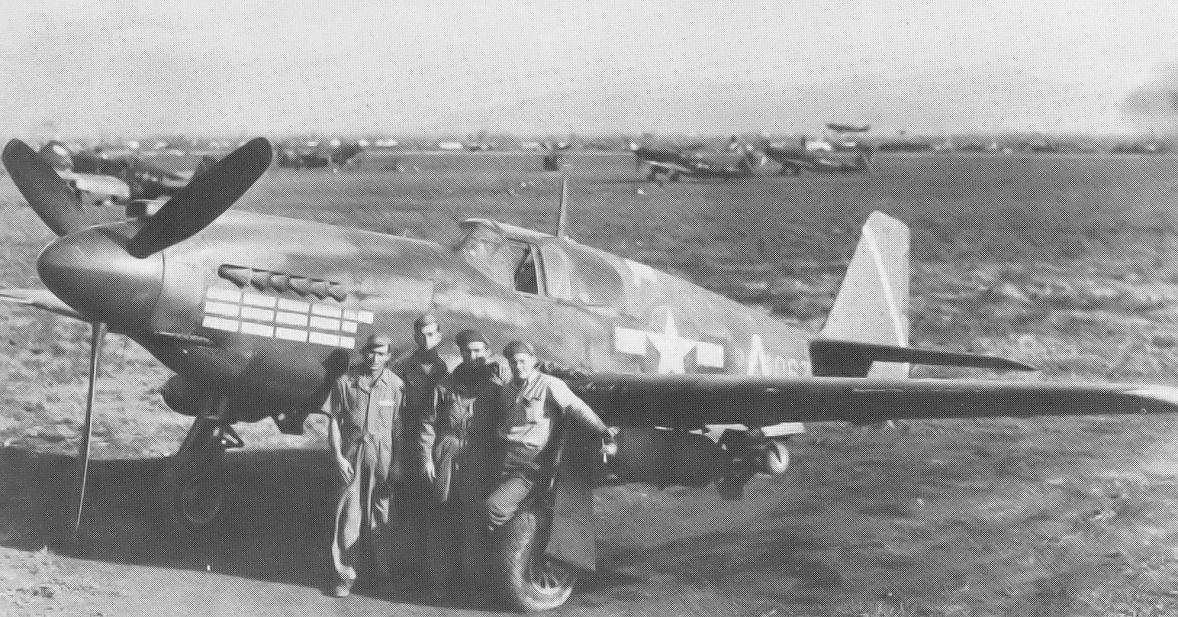
86th A-36 Apache in North Africa

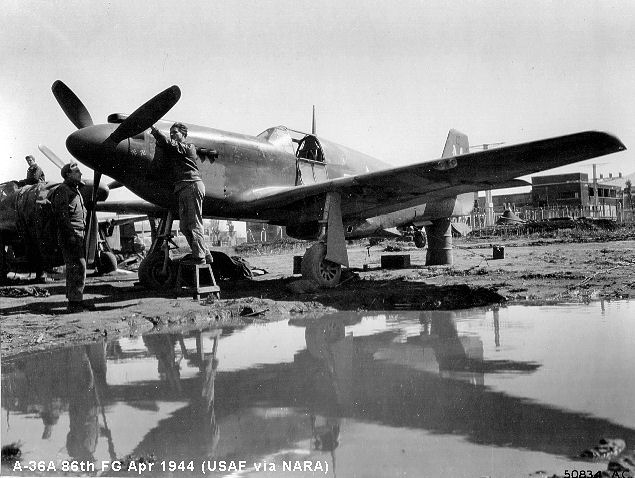
86th FG A-36A Apache being serviced in Italy, 1944

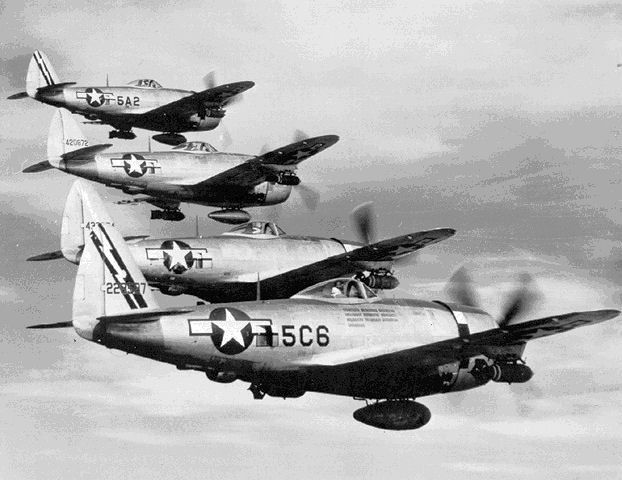
86th FG P-47 Thunderbolts, 1944

On 14 July, initial elements of the 86th embarked for Comiso Airport, Sicily. The entire group settled into the airfield at Gela West, by 21 July. The following day the group flew its first mission from that base, supporting the 1st Division of II Army Corps. By the time the Germans withdrew from Sicily on 17 August, the group had flown 2,375 combat sorties in Sicily and along the southern coast of Italy.

The group was redesignated the 86th Fighter Bomber Group on 23 August 1943, and its squadrons, the 309th, 310th, and 312th Bombardment Squadrons (Light) redesignated the 525th, 526th and 527th Fighter-Bomber Squadrons. On 27 August, the newly designated group moved to Barcelona Landing Ground, Sicily where the group provided air support for the first Allied landings on the European mainland at Salerno, Italy. On 10 September 1943, three days after the invasion of Salerno, advance echelons of the 86th moved to Sele Airfield, near the beachhead. Enemy shelling of the beaches caused considerable difficulty during the move, and the group did not fly its first missions until 15 September.

After the fall of Naples, the group moved to Serretella Airfield, then on to Pomigliano d'Arco where it remained for some time. Throughout 1943–44, the 86th FBG supported Allied forces by attacking enemy lines of communication, troop concentrations and supply areas. Then, on 30 April 1944, the 86th moved to Marcianise Airfield to prepare for the spring offensive against the German Gustav Line. It also attacked rail and road targets and strafed German troop and supply columns during late spring, earning a Distinguished Unit Citation (DCU) for outstanding action against the enemy on 25 May when the group flew 12 armed reconnaissance and bombing missions and 86 sorties, destroyed 217 enemy vehicles and damaged 245, silenced several gun positions, and interdicted the highways into the towns of Frosinone, Cori, and Cescano. The group suffered heavy losses—two aircraft lost, six others heavily damaged, and one pilot killed.

The 86th was an active participant in Operation Strangle, the attempt to cut German supply lines prior to the Allied offensive aimed at rail and road networks, and attacking German troop and supply columns. While Strangle did not significantly cut into German supplies, it did disrupt enemy tactical mobility and was a major factor in the Allies' eventual breakthrough. During this period the 86th received P-40 Warhawks to augment its aging A-36s, but the obsolescent P-40s were only a stopgap measure. On 30 May 1944, the 86th received its final wartime designation, the 86th Fighter Group, but more importantly the group welcomed its first P-47 Thunderbolts a few weeks later, on 23 June. The tough, modern P-47 was welcomed by the group's pilots, as was their move to Orbetello Airfield, on the west coast of Italy, between 18 and 30 June.

In mid-July, the 86th continued its tour of the Italian coast by moving to Poretta Airfield, near Casamozza, on the island of Corsica. From Poretta, the fighter group flew bombing missions against coastal defenses in direct support of Operation Dragoon, the Allied invasion of southern France 15 August 1944. Allied forces met little resistance as they moved inland twenty miles in the first twenty-four hours. Once the invasion was completed, the 86th moved back to Grosseto Airfield, Italy and continued its coastal basing by attacking enemy road and rail networks in northern Italy and, for the first time, flying regular escort missions with heavy bombers. The group also conducted armed reconnaissance against the enemy in the Po Valley region.

In October 1944, the 86th was ordered to move to a new base in Pisa, Italy, but the weather turned bad, limiting the group's combat flying and impeding its movement to Pisa. Finally, on 23 October, the first echelon moved to Pisa while the main body remained at Grosseto, but severe floods at both locations hampered the move. It was 6 November before the 86th FG finally completed the move to Pisa.

The group continued combat in northern Italy until February 1945, when it left the Mediterranean Theater and moved to Tantonville Airfield (Y-1), France, in the Lorraine region, and operations shifted from targets in the Po Valley to those in southern Germany. The group's first mission to Germany – a cause of some excitement – was on 25 February 1945, and by March most missions were flown into Germany against rail lines, roads, supply dumps, enemy installations and airfields. The 86th FG transferred from Tantonville to Braunshardt Airfield (R-12), near Darmstadt, Germany, in April. A "maximum effort" on 20 April to stop all enemy transportation in southern Germany earned the group its second Distinguished Unit Citation. The 86th Fighter Group flew its final combat mission on 8 May 1945. By the end of that war, the group had flown a total of 28,662 combat sorties and claimed the destruction of 9,960 vehicles, 10,420 rail cars, 1,114 locomotives and 515 enemy aircraft.

Just after the war, the group performed occupation duty at Braunshardt (Now designated AAF Station Braunshardt) which became a replacement depot to process troops returning to French staging areas for shipment home. Flying personnel performed routine training to maintain their proficiency. On 25–26 September 1945, the group moved to AAF Station Schweinfurt, Germany to begin operations as a unit of the occupation force. The group's squadrons lost their personnel without replacement in October – November, and the group headquarters began absorbing all squadron personnel in October, completing the shift on 24 November 1945

At midnight on 14 February 1946, group headquarters personnel were assigned to Detachment A, 64th Fighter Wing. The designation of the group and squadrons moved, without personnel or equipment, to Bolling Field, Washington, DC, to join Continental Air Forces (later, Strategic Air Command). However, Continental Air Forces had a surplus of units and on 31 March 1946, the 86th and its units were inactivated and its aircraft being sent to the new "Schweinfurt Air Depot" operated by Air Technical Service Command for deposition.

=== United States Air Forces in Europe ===
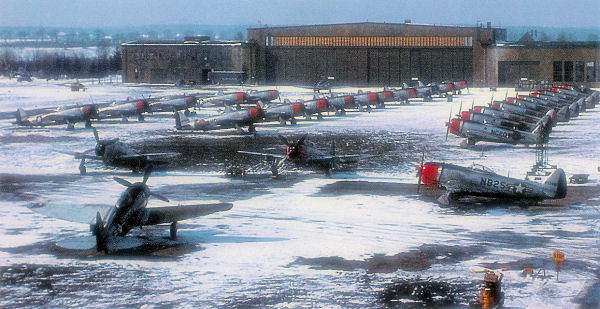
F-47D's of the 526th Fighter Squadron at Neubiberg Air Base

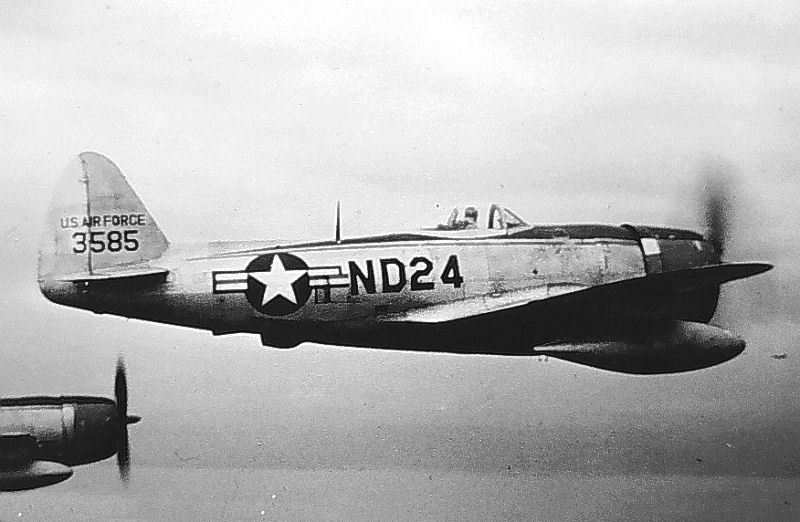
F-47D 44–33585, 86th Fighter Group, over Germany

This inactivation was followed by a fast-moving and often confusing set of events linked to America's realization that it was involved in a Cold War with the Soviet Union. Less than five months later, the 86th Fighter Group was reactivated in Germany on 20 August 1946, being assigned to USAFE and being stationed at AAF Station Nordholz, near Bremerhaven, assuming the personnel and equipment of the inactivated 406th Fighter Group. The activation is in accordance with Air Force policy of having low-numbered units active as much as possible. Personnel and materiel included P-47 fighters. The 86th was to serve as part of the occupation force and to maintain combat proficiency

On 14 November 1946, the group moved to AAF Station Lechfeld, near Augsburg, Germany. However, Lechfeld was scheduled for closure, and in January 1947, the 86th FG became a "paper unit" when all of its P-47s and all but one officer and a few enlisted men transferred to other units. On 15 May 1947, the "paper" group lost one fighter squadron, the 527th, but gained a reconnaissance squadron and moved to Fürstenfeldbruck Air Base, Germany. The addition of a reconnaissance mission caused the group to be redesignated as the 86th Composite Group.

The 86th then moved to Neubiberg Air Base, near Munich, Germany on 12 June to replace the 33d Fighter Group. On 25 June 33 FG became non-operational and the 86th Composite Group moved from paper unit to a "real" unit as it received personnel and P-47 Thunderbolts for its two squadrons. These were low-time Thunderbolts taken from various storage depots in Germany. From 25 July to 25 August 1947, the group also exercised operational control over a P-51D Mustang squadron (later known as Detachment A, 86th Composite Group). The reconnaissance squadron's assignment to the group terminated on 25 January 1948, and the group assumed its former designation as the 86th Fighter Group.

On 1 July 1948, the group was assigned under the newly activated 86th Fighter Wing on 15 August 1947 under the Hobson Plan, which was activated at Neubiberg. With the new organization, the group became the tactical component of the new wing.

That same day, just a week after the Soviets blocked the land routes to Berlin and the Berlin Airlift began. The mission of the 86th FW was providing air defense for the Berlin Airlift cargo flights, then general air defense, flying patrols along the American and British side of the Soviet occupation zone border as a deterrent to Soviet fighters intruding on western airspace.

==== 86th Fighter-Interceptor/Bomber Group ====
It was obvious that the piston-engine Thunderbolts would be no match for Soviet jet fighters, and in January 1950 the 86th Fighter Wing was told it would re-equip with F-84E Thunderjets for the fighter-bomber mission.

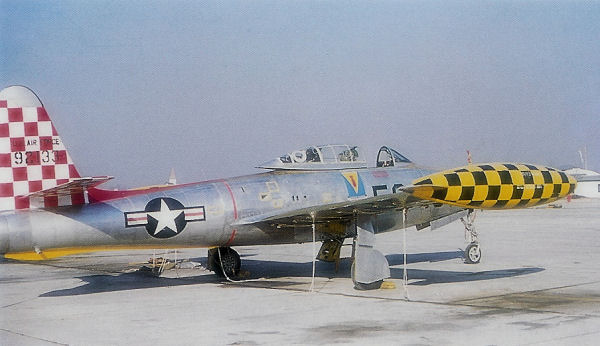
Republic F-84E-5-RE Thunderjet AF Serial No. 49-2133 of the 527th Fighter-Bomber Squadron at Neubiberg Air Base, West Germany.

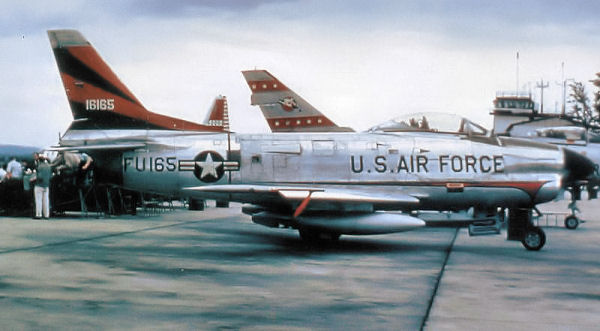
North American F-86D-35-NA Sabre AF Serial No. 51-6165 of the 526th Fighter-Inteceptor Squadron

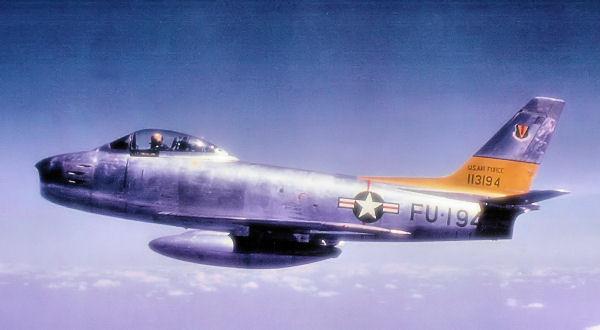
North American F-86F-25-NH Sabre AF Serial No. 51-13194 of the 527th Fighter-Bomber Squadron – 1954

On 20 January the wing was redesignated the 86th Fighter-Bomber Wing, and in October 1950 the 27th Fighter-Escort Wing, Bergstrom Air Force Base, Texas, ferried ninety-one F-84E Thunderjets to Neubiberg. The 86th's old Thunderbolts were distributed to other NATO countries.

With the arrival of the jets, the 86th was one of two active USAF fighter units in Germany (the other being the 36th FG) during the immediate postwar years. Over the next several years, the 86th underwent several redesignations and several station assignments in occupied Germany. In June 1948, the 86th Fighter Wing was stationed at Neubiberg Air Base, near Munich when tensions with the Soviet Union culminated in the Berlin Blockade.

The F-84s of the 86th had elaborate red-and-white checkerboard patterns covering all tail surfaces, with checkerboard patterns on the outer halves of the tip tanks and intakes. In the fall of 1952, the USAFE Skyblazer acrobatic team was assigned to the 86th FBW. The last demonstration flight was made in July 1953.

With the arrival of the jet age in Europe, USAFE wanted to move its units west of the Rhine River, as its bases in the Munich area were just a few minutes flying time from Soviet MiG-15 bases in Czechoslovakia. The 86th's new name and mission continued as the wing prepared to move to a newly constructed base in Ramstein-Landstuhl near Kaiserslautern, Germany, initially named Landstuhl Air Base.

Under the command of Lieutenant Colonel Clyde M. Burwell, Detachment 1 of Headquarters 86th Fighter-Bomber Wing arrived at Landstuhl AB on 17 February 1952 and opened the facilities that would become the Ramstein flight line and facilities south of Kisling Memorial Drive. Landstuhl Air Base opened for operations on 5 August 1952, and the 86th Fighter Bomber Wing arrived on 21 August.

On 23 March 1953, the Air Force used the 86th for a "service test" reorganization, changing the wing's structure from four groups to two groups—one combat and one support. The purpose of the test was to determine the maximum efficiency obtainable with minimum personnel. In April 1953, the 86th completed its move to Landstuhl and was soon reequipped with the F-86F Sabre Jet, the first unit in USAFE to fly the most modern American fighter. The F-86F had been very successful as both a fighter and fighter bomber in the Korean War, and marked a quantum increase in the Wing's capabilities.

A year later the 86th was redesignated the 86th Fighter-Interceptor Group and assumed a new mission of air defense for the central European region. For this mission, the wing gradually replaced its F-86Fs with rocket-armed F-86D Sabre interceptors which provided an all-weather capability. On 27 July 1956,

The group was not operational from 22 May 1954 to 8 October 1955 and 10 August 1956 to 8 March 1958, when it inactivated, during which period tactical squadrons were attached directly to the 86th Fighter-Interceptor Wing as the Air Force reorganized its wings into the tri-deputate system.

The inactivation of the combat group in the 86th FIG and combat groups throughout the USAF resulted in their World War II histories being lost. One must understand the "group" and "wing" are two distinct and separate units. The modern USAF wings wanted to retain the proud histories of the combat groups and requested that the groups be redesignated as wings. The request was denied, but it was decided to "temporarily" bestow the histories and honors of the combat groups. The "temporary" bestowals have remained in effect to this day

==== 86th Tactical Fighter Group ====
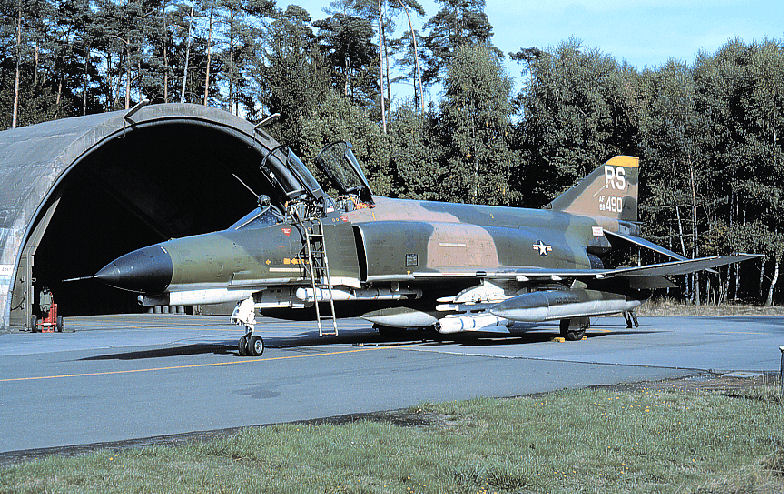
512th Tactical Fighter Squadron McDonnell Douglas F-4E-40-MC Phantom 68–0488, 1978.

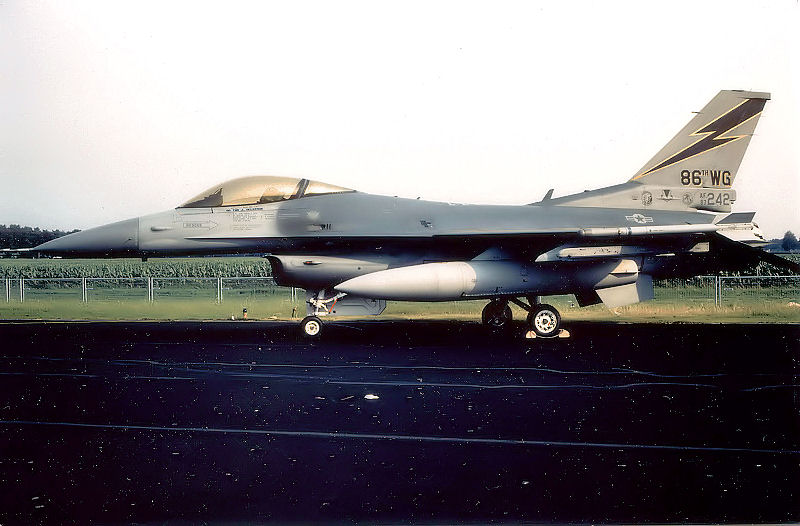
86 OG General Dynamics F-16C Block 30F Fighting Falcon AF Serial No. 87-0242

Between September 1975 and June 1985, the group element of the 86th Tactical Fighter Wing was reactivated as the 86th Tactical Fighter Group. The group controlled the 512th and 526th Tactical Fighter Squadrons, equipped with F-4E Phantom IIs. It trained and provided tactical air capability in Europe for the North Atlantic Treaty Organization (NATO). The group element was inactivated and control of the squadrons was returned to the Wing.

=== 1990s ===
On 1 May 1991, the 86th Operations Group was activated as a result of the 86th Fighter Wing implementing the USAF objective wing organization. Upon activation, the 86 OG was bestowed the lineage and history of the 86th Tactical Fighter Group. The 86 OG was assigned control of the wing's tactical units.

After activation again in Germany in May 1991, flew fighter missions to enforce no-fly zones in northern Iraq and Bosnia-Herzegovina.

With the end of the Cold War in the early 1990s, the 86th was realigned to become an Airlift Wing. On 1 June 1992, the 86 OG added an airlift mission and began performing special airlift missions with C–12, C–20, C–21, CT–43 and C–135 aircraft. On 1 July 1993, the 86th added another mission, aeromedical evacuation. The Second Aeromedical Evacuation Squadron and the 55th Aeromedical Airlift Squadron were transferred from Rhein-Main to Ramstein. The 55th added another aircraft type, the C-9A Nightingale, to the 86th's inventory. Shortly after its move, on 1 October 1993, the 55th AAS was inactivated and became the 75th Airlift Squadron and the 58th AS was inactivated and became the 76th Airlift Squadron as the Air Force was attempting to sustain the lineage of its oldest units in an ever-decreasing force. To complete the shuffle, the Second Aeromedical Evacuation Squadron inactivated on 16 August 1994, and renamed the 86th Aeromedical Evacuation Squadron, but with Second AES' personnel, funds and equipment.

While other aircraft were moving in, the 86th retained its fighter role. On 17 August 1993, the 86th received its first LANTIRN-capable Block 40 F-16C, which eventually replaced the earlier Block 30 F-16s. One month later, the 86th began flying combat air patrol and close air support missions over Bosnia-Herzegovina in support of Operation Deny Flight.

Under Deny Flight, Serbian aircraft were forbidden to fly over Bosnian territory, and many of the 86th F-16s deployed to Aviano AB, Italy to enforce the restrictions. On 28 February 1994, the 86th salved some of its frustrations from missing Desert Storm when two F-16Cs from the 86th's 526th Fighter Squadron were directed to intercept six Serbian Soko G-4 Super Galebs detected bombing targets in the town of Bugojno, Bosnia-Herzegovina by a USAF E-3 Sentry. The Galebs were warned twice to land or leave the UN no-fly zone, but both warnings were ignored and the two F-16s were vectored in to intercept the Galebs. Two more warnings were given, and the F-16Cs were given clearance to fire. F-16C 89–2137, flown by Capt. Robert Wright, fired a single AIM-120 AMRAAM which dispatched the lead Galeb, and then fired two Sidewinders which destroyed two more Galebs. The second F-16C flown by Capt. Scott O'Grady fired a Sidewinder at the fourth aircraft, but this missile missed. A second flight of F-16Cs was vectored in by the AWACS, and the lead aircraft from this flight destroyed a fourth Galeb near Banja-Luka, Bosnia-Herzegovina. The remaining two Galebs managed to escape Bosnian airspace via Croatia. This was the first offensive action ever performed by NATO warplanes.

While the F-16s were supporting Deny Flight, the decision was made to change the 86th Wing from a composite wing to a wing devoted to intra-theater airlift, and the 86th Wing began to assume the airlift mission previously held by C-130 Hercules aircraft at the 435th Airlift Wing at Rhein Main Air Base, Germany, which was slated for inactivation. By 1994, the tactical fighters of the 86 OG began to be transferred to other USAFE bases. On 1 July, the 526th FS inactivated and its aircraft and personnel moved to Aviano Air Base, Italy to form the 555th FS. The 512th FS was inactivated on 1 October, with its aircraft and personnel also being moved to Aviano, being assigned to the 510th FS. On 21 July 1994 the 86th Wing held a "Fighter Farewell" ceremony for the departure of its last F 16s, most to the 31st FW at Aviano AB, and the 86th Wing became the 86th Airlift Wing.

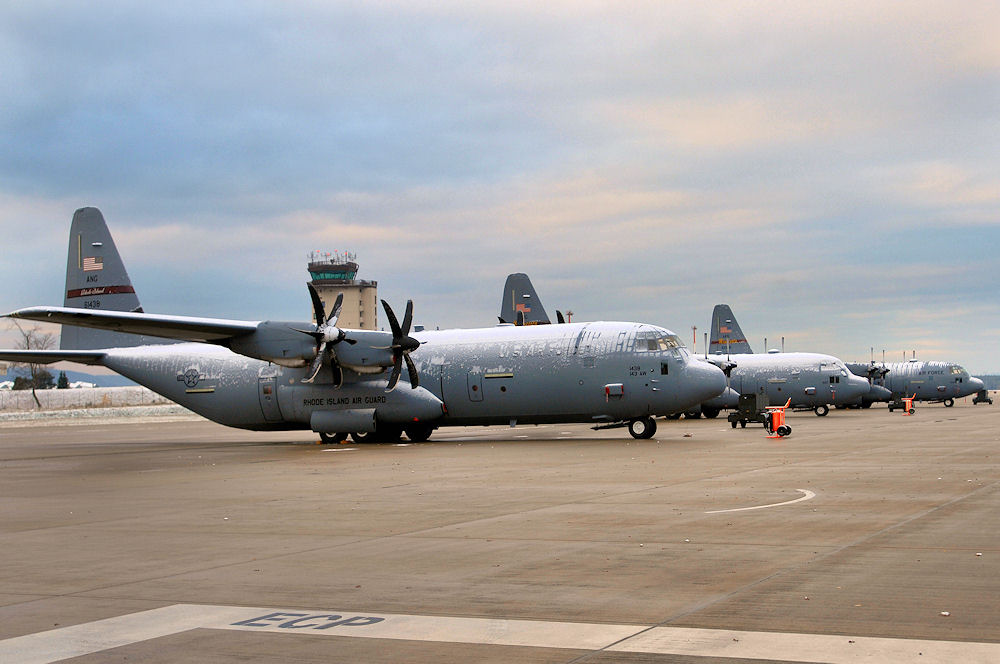
C-130s of the 86th OG on the ramp at Ramstein AB

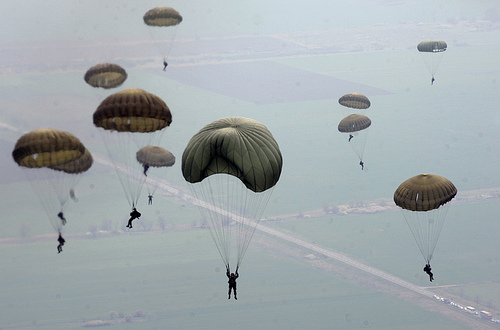
A C-130E Hercules from the 86 OG delivers U.S. Air Force and Bulgarian Special Forces paratroopers to a drop zone near Bezmer Aviation Base, Bulgaria, during Exercise Thracian Spring 2008.

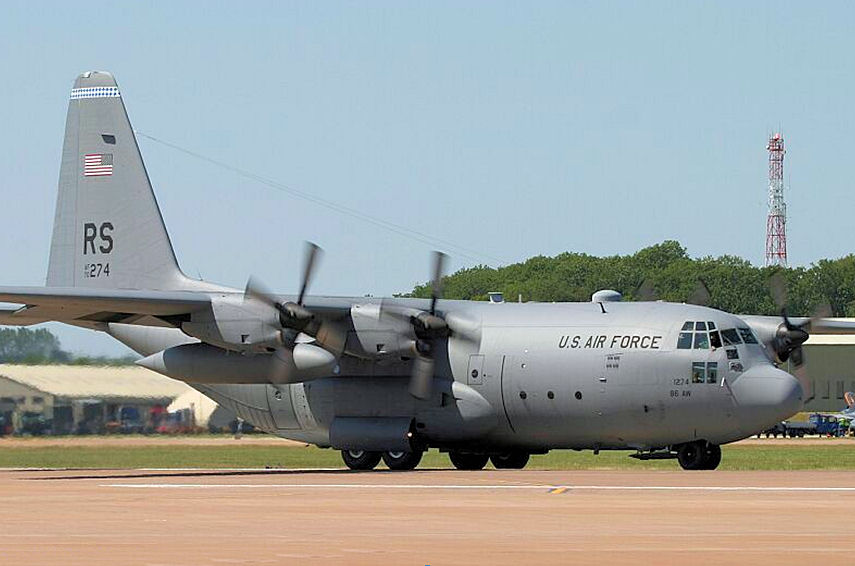
37AS C-130E at Ramstein (USAF)

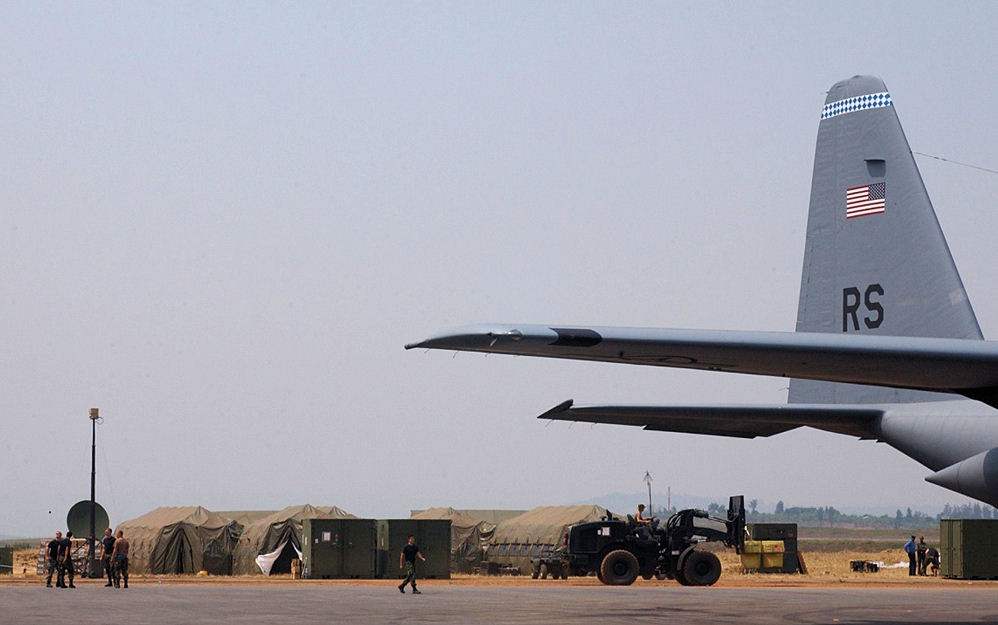
37 AS C-130E supporting humanitarian operations (USAF)

To start the flow of C-130 personnel to the 86th, the 435th AW sent approximately 200 personnel from the 37th Airlift Squadron as a Detachment to Ramstein on 7 March 1994. This small detachment began planning and administrative activities, serving as a central point for incoming personnel and equipment transferring to Ramstein. On 28 June 1994, the first two C-130E Hercules aircraft to be permanently stationed at Ramstein arrived. Gradually, more C-130Es and personnel arrived, until the 37th Airlift Squadron finally had a total of 19 C-130Es and approximately 1,100 personnel.

The first real test for the 86th and Ramstein AB as the USAFE center of intra-theater airlift operations began in December 1995 with Operation Joint Endeavor, the deployment of US and allied nations' peacekeeping forces to Bosnia. While highly successful, the operation was marred when, on 3 April 1996, the 86th AW's sole CT-43 crashed near Dubrovnik, Croatia, claiming the lives of 35 people, including the Secretary of Commerce Ronald H. Brown, who had been on a mission to improve the economy and infrastructure of the former Yugoslavia.

Joint Endeavor concluded 20 December 1996, and US forces became part of the new NATO-led Stabilization Force in Bosnia-Herzegovina known as Operation Joint Guard. On 20 June 1998, Joint Guard ended and the Stabilization Force transitioned to a slightly smaller follow-on force, and was renamed Operation Joint Forge. The 86th AW, with augmentation support from active duty, Air National Guard and Reserve units from the United States, successfully sustained this effort by delivering US Army and Air Force peacekeeping forces and equipment into the area. By 31 December 2000, the 86th AW and its supporting units had transported over 48,000 tons of cargo and 111,164 personnel into, around and out of the theater of operations.

In April 1996, the 86th responded to a Noncombatant Evacuation Order, from the nation of Liberia as part of Operation Assured Response. Eight aeromedical personnel and two C-130s with 50 personnel deployed to Dakar, Senegal. During the two-week operation, C-130 aircrews flew 30 missions and evacuated 632 Americans. From February to March 1997, the wing executed Operation Assured Lift with five C-130s and 147 personnel delivering peacekeepers of the Economic Community of West African to Liberia.

In March 1997, the wing's Contingency Operations Flight supported another NEO, Operation Silver Wake, this time in the Balkan state of Albania. The 86th AW personnel oversaw 62 missions by CH-46s, CH-47s and CH-53s moving 1,550 evacuees. For its support of Joint Guard and Assured Lift, along with numerous other contingencies during the period of July 1996 to June 1997, the 86th AW received its seventh Air Force Outstanding Unit Award.

During 1997 and 1998, the 86th AW supported continued operations in the Persian Gulf Region, Operations Northern Watch and Southern Watch, as well as Phoenix Scorpion I-IV, the deployment of forces as a show of force to compel Iraq to comply with UN weapons inspectors. The Phoenix Scorpion deployments provided the means for later coercive air strikes against Iraq. From 1998 through 2000, 86th AW personnel supported Operation Provide Hope, the delivery of excess medical supplies to the Republic of Moldova in the former Soviet Union.

In 1999 the former Republic of Yugoslavia sought to reclaim the region of Kosovo, and this led to a period of "ethnic cleansing". When Yugoslavia failed to comply with provisions of United Nations Security Council Resolution 1199 and continued its ethnic cleansing operations, NATO, led by the United States, began Operation Allied Force. Allied Force focused on bombing key Yugoslavian targets in an effort to persuade President Slobodan Milosevic of Yugoslavia to comply with UN resolutions. In support of Allied Force, the 86th AW flew 396 missions carrying 3,000 tons of cargo and 1,492 passengers to various destinations within the European theater.

Upon the conclusion of Allied Force the 86th AW began Operation Joint Guardian, the peacekeeping operation in Kosovo to establish a secure environment for the return of the refugees, and executed the first combat airdrop into Kosovo, Operation Rapid Guardian, flying seven sorties and dropping approximately 130 US Army Paratroopers.

From 24 March to 14 July 1999, the 86th AW began Operation Shining Hope, a mission of humanitarian support for refugees displaced by the conflict in the Balkans with shelter and food. This new operation was based at Tirane, Albania.

On 5 May 1999, US President William Clinton, accompanied by Secretary of State Madeleine Albright, Secretary of Defense William Cohen, and Chairman of the Joint Chiefs of Staff Gen Henry Shelton and a large assortment of congressional delegates visited the 86th AW and Ramstein AB. During his visit, the President confirmed the 86th AW's informal motto, "The World’s Greatest Airlift Wing".

=== 21st century ===
Beginning on 17 August 2000, the 86th Wing moved a large contingent of American soldiers to a staging base in Skopje, Macedonia, then on to Kosovo as part of NATO's Immediate Ready Force. By 31 December 2000, the 86th AW, with support from deployed C-130 units, transported 5,000 tons of cargo and 30,604 personnel to support US forces in Kosovo.

In October 2000, the 75th AS provided airlift in support of evacuation operations of U.S. Navy sailors injured as a result of the terrorist bombing of the USS Cole in Aden, Yemen. The mission to Yemen and Djibouti brought 28 sailors to Landstuhl Regional Medical Center, Germany.

In 2006, the 86 OG acquired a sole C-40B previously operated by the 89th Airlift Wing at Andrews AFB, MD to replace the C-9A Nightingale which was retired in 2005. The C-9A, AF Serial No. 71-0876, was used to ferry the USAFE Commander to other areas in the European theater, and was not set up for medevac purposes. It was the last C-9A in service with USAF. The aircraft left Ramstein on 20 September 2005 and it was on display at Andrews AFB, MD until it was sold to a civilian company and registered as N10876. The C-40B, AF Serial No. 01-0040, (the USAF version of the Boeing 737-700 BBJ) is configured as an airborne command post.

Today, the 86 OG provides theater airlift, distinguished visitor transport and aeromedical evacuation capability by maintaining readiness to deploy and employ all assets across the spectrum of air combat support missions. The fleet consists of one C-40B, two C-20H's, 10 C-21A's, one C-37 and 17 C-130E's, and one C-37 based at Chievres. The group also leads operations at two geographically separated airfields, Moron AB, Spain, and Chievres AB, Belgium.

At the beginning of 2008, the increased numbers of C-130s available made it possible for the wing to resume flying HHQ-directed missions around the USAFE AOR, and the wing began to fly a 24/7 schedule. At the same time, the wing also began to slowly look forward to replacing its old C-130Es with new C-130Js, scheduled for April 2009. As the arrival of the C-130Js drew closer, the wing put on a full scale planning push and began construction on C-130J infrastructure.

=== Lineage ===
- Established as 86th Bombardment Group (Light) on 13 January 1942

Activated on 10 February 1942
Redesignated: 86th Bombardment Group (Dive) on 3 September 1942
Redesignated: 86th Fighter-Bomber Group on 23 August 1943
Redesignated: 86th Fighter Group on 30 May 1944
Inactivated on 31 March 1946

- Activated on 20 August 1946, assuming personnel and equipment of 405th Fighter Group

Redesignated: 86th Composite Group on 15 May 1947
Redesignated: 86th Fighter Group on 25 January 1948*
Redesignated: 86th Fighter-Bomber Group on 20 January 1950
Redesignated: 86th Fighter-Interceptor Group on 9 August 1954
Inactivated on 8 March 1958

- Redesignated 86th Tactical Fighter Group on 11 September 1975

Activated on 22 September 1975
Inactivated on 14 June 1985

- Redesignated 86th Operations Group, and activated, on 1 May 1991.

* Note: Became subordinate unit of 86th Fighter Wing 1 July 1948

=== Assignments ===
- Air Force Combat Command, 10 February 1942
- Second Air Force, c. 28 February 1942
- XII Bomber Command, 1 May 1942
- Third Air Force, 21 July 1942
- III Bomber Command, 8 May 1942
- III Ground Air Support (later, III Air Support) Command, 10 August 1942

Attached to 23d Provisional Training Wing, c. September 1942-c. March 1943

- Northwest African Training Command, c. 11 May 1943
- Northwest African Tactical Air Force, c. 29 June 1943
- 64th Fighter Wing, July 1943
- XII Air Support (later, XII Tactical Air) Command, c. November 1943
- 87th Fighter Wing, 9 September 1944
- XII Fighter (later, XXII Tactical Air) Command, 15 September 1944
- XII Tactical Air Command, 20 February 1945

Attached to 64th Fighter Wing, 21 February 1945-unknown

- I Tactical Air Force (Provisional), c. 30 April 1945

Attached to XII Tactical Air Command, c. 30 April – 19 June 1945

- XII Tactical Air Command, 20 June 1945
- 64th Fighter Wing, August 1945
- Continental Air Forces (later, Strategic Air Command), 15 February – 31 March 1946
- 64th Fighter Wing, 20 August 1946
- XII Tactical Air Command, 1 March 1947
- United States Air Forces in Europe, 6 October 1947
- 86th Fighter (later, 86th Fighter-Bomber; 86th Fighter-Interceptor) Wing, 1 July 1948 – 8 March 1958
- 86th Tactical Fighter Wing, 22 September 1975 – 14 June 1985
- 86th Fighter Wing (later, 86th Wing; 86th Airlift Wing), 1 May 1991 – present

=== Components ===
- 37th Airlift Squadron: 1 October 1994 – present
- 55th Aeromedical Airlift: 1 July – 1 October 1993
- 58th Airlift Squadron: 1 June 1992 – 1 October 1993
- 75th Airlift Squadron: 1 October 1993 – 30 September 2003
- 76th Airlift Squadron: 1 October 1993 – present
- 309th Airlift Squadron: 12 March 2002 – 5 October 2012
- 45th Reconnaissance (later, 45th Tactical Reconnaissance): 15 May 1947 – 25 January 1948
- 60th Fighter Squadron: attached 25 January – 25 August 1947
- 99th Fighter Squadron: attached 11–30 June 1944
- 309th Bombardment (later, 525th Fighter-Bomber; 525th Fighter; 525th Fighter-Bomber; 525th Fighter-Interceptor): 10 February 1942 – 31 March 1946 (not operational 24 November 1945 – 31 March 1946); 20 August 1946 – 8 March 1958 (detached 22 May 1954 – 7 October 1955 and 10 August 1956 – 8 March 1958)
- 310th Bombardment (later, 526th Fighter-Bomber; 526th Fighter; 526th Fighter-Bomber; 526th Fighter-Interceptor; 526th Tactical Fighter; 526th Fighter): 10 February 1942 – 31 March 1946 (not operational October 1945-31 March 1946); 20 August 1946 – 8 March 1958 (detached 22 May 1954 – 7 October 1955 and 10 August 1956 – 8 March 1958); 22 September 1975 – 14 June 1985; 1 May 1991 – 1 July 1994
- 311th Bombardment Squadron: 10 February 1942 – 20 June 1943
- 312th Bombardment (later, 527th Fighter-Bomber; 527th Fighter; 527th Fighter-Bomber; 527th Fighter-Day): 10 February 1942 – 31 March 1946 (not operational 24 November 1945 – 31 March 1946): 20 August 1946 – 15 May 1947; 25 January 1948 – 8 February 1956 (detached 22 May 1954 – 7 October 1955)
- 440th Fighter-Interceptor Squadron: attached 8 October 1955 – 2 January 1956, assigned 3 January 1956 – 8 March 1958 (detached 10 August 1956 – 8 March 1958)
- 461st Fighter-Day Squadron: attached 8 February – 3 May 1956
- 496th Fighter-Interceptor Squadron: attached 8 October 1955 – 2 January 1956, assigned 3 January 1956 – 8 March 1958 (detached 10 August 1956 – 8 March 1958)
- 512th Tactical Fighter (later, 512th Fighter): 15 November 1976 – 14 June 1985; 1 May 1991 – 1 October 1994.

=== Stations ===
- Will Rogers Field, Oklahoma, 10 February 1942
- Hunter Field, Georgia, c. 22 June 1942
- Key Field, Mississippi, c. 7 August 1942
- Camp Kilmer, New Jersey, 22 March – 28 April 1943
- Oran Es Sénia Airport, Oran, Algeria, 11 May 1943
- Marnia Airfield, French Morocco, 3 June 1943
- Tafaraoui Airfield, Algeria, 11 June 1943
- Korba Airfield, Tunisia, 30 June 1943
- Gela West Landing Ground, Sicily, 21 July 1943
- Barcelona Landing Ground, Sicily, 27 August 1943
- Sele Airfield, Italy, 22 September 1943
- Serretella Airfield, Italy, 12 October 1943
- Pomigliano Airfield, Italy, 19 November 1943
- Marcianise Airfield Italy, 30 April 1944
- Rome Ciampino Airport, Italy, c. 12 June 1944
- Orbetello Airfield, Italy, c. 19 June 1944
- Poretta Airfield, Corsica, c. 12 July 1944
- Grosseto Airfield, Italy, c. 17 September 1944
- Pisa Airport, Italy, 6 November 1944
- Tatonville Airfield (Y-1), France, 20 February 1945
- Braunshardt Airfield (Y-72), Germany, c. 17 April 1945
- AAF Station Schweinfurt, Germany, 26 September 1945 – 15 February 1946
- Bolling Field, Washington, D.C., 15 February – 31 March 1946
- AAF Station Nordholz, Germany, 20 August 1946
- AAF Station Lechfeld, Germany c. 14 November 1946
- AAF Station Bad Kissingen, Germany, 5 March 1947
- AAF Station Neubiberg, Germany, 12 June 1947

Deployed at Munich-Riem AB, Germany, July-7 August 1948
Deployed at Giebelstadt AB, Germany (Later West Germany), 20 May – 3 August 1951

- Landstuhl AB, West Germany, 9 August 1952 – 8 March 1958
- Ramstein AB, West Germany (later Germany), 22 September 1975 – 14 June 1985; 1 May 1991 – present

=== Aircraft ===
- A-20 Havoc, 1942
- A-24 Banshee, 1942
- A-31, 1942
- DB-7 Boston, 1942
- A-36 Apache, 1942–1944
- P-40 Warhawk, 1944
- P-47 Thunderbolt, 1944–1946
- P (later, F)-47 Thunderbolt, 1946–1947; 1947–1950
- P-51 Mustang, 1947–1948
- B-26 Invader, 1947–1948
- F-6, 1947–1948
- B-26 Invader, 1947
- F-84, 1950–1953
- F-86, 1953–1954, 1955–1956
- F-4, 1975–1985
- F-16, 1991–1994
- C-135, 1992
- C-12, 1992–1994
- C-20, 1992–?
- C-21, 1992–present
- CT-43, 1992–1996
- UH-1, 1992–1993
- C-9, 1993–?
- C-130, 1994–present
- C-37, 2000–present

== See also ==
503d Air Service Group Support organization for group from 1945 to March 1946
