= Braunshardt Airfield =

Former German military airfield

Braunshardt Airfield Advanced Landing Ground Y-72 Feldflugplatz Weiterstadt

- Hesse, Germany Braunshardt Airfield (Germany)

Site information
- Type: Military Airfield

Location
- Coordinates: 49°54′36″N 008°32′30″E

Site history
- In use: 1945 (United States Army Air Forces)

Braunshardt Airfield is a former military airfield in Germany, about 2.7 miles (4.3 kilometers) east-southeast of the center of Groß-Gerau (Hesse) into Worfelden district, and approximately 275 miles (440 kilometers) southwest of Berlin.

== History ==
Braunshardt Airfield's origins begin as a 5500x150' concrete landing strip laid down 09/27 by the Luftwaffe, probably in late 1944 as an emergency landing airfield just to the south of Worfelden, in a series of wheat fields. There are no records of any use by the Luftwaffe of the airfield. The IX Engineering Command 832d Engineering Aviation Brigade moved into the area on 27 March 1945 and enabled the strip to become a combat resupply and casualty evacuation field, designating it as Advanced Landing Ground "Y-72". The 850th EAB then expanded the facility, adding an extensive set of dispersal pads and taxiways using Pierced Steel Planking and enabling it to be used as a combat airfield.

On 13 April the Twelfth Air Force 86th Fighter Group moved into the facility from Tantonville Airfield in eastern France, with P-47 Thunderbolts. The P-61 Black Widow equipped 415th Night Fighter Squadron moved in on 17 April. Both of these units remained at the airfield until the end of the war, eventually moving out in September and October 1945 when many units were moved out of the Frankfurt area and into Bavaria.

The airfield was closed on 30 October, and was eventually dismantled. Today, little or no evidence of the airfield remains in the agricultural area.

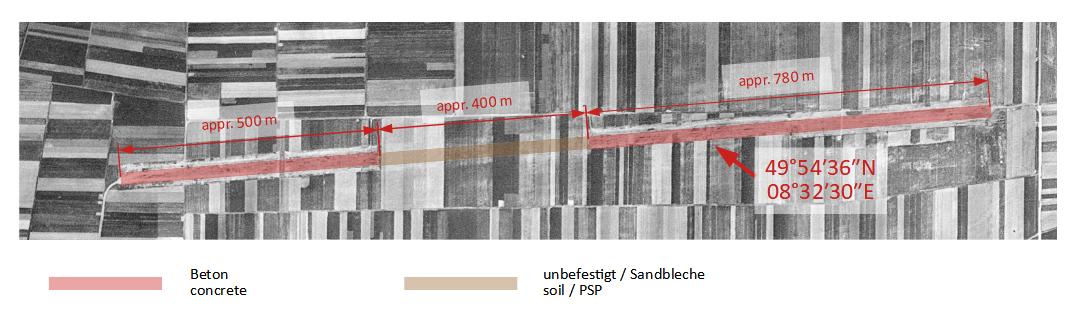
Remains of the landing strip on an aerial photograph from the 1950s. PSPs were removed after the departure of the Air Force.

== See also ==
- Advanced Landing Ground
