= Barcellona Landing Ground =

WWII military airfield

Barcellona Landing Ground
- Part of Twelfth Air Force

Site information
- Type: Military Airfield
- Controlled by: United States Army Air Forces

Location
- Coordinates: 38°13′00.05″N 015°13′59.86″E (Approximate)

Site history
- Built: 1943
- In use: 1943

Location of Barcelona Landing Ground, Italy

Barcellona Landing Ground is an abandoned World War II military airfield in Sicily, located in the southwestern suburbs of Milazzo, near Barcellona Pozzo di Gotto. It was a temporary field built by the Army Corps of Engineers used as part of the Invasion of Italy in August 1943.

The airfield primarily used by the United States Army Air Force Twelfth Air Force 86th Bombardment Group from 27 August until 22 September. From Barcelona LG, the group flew missions over the Italian mainland, and flew air support for allied landings at Salareno (Operation Avalanche).

When the 86th moved out the airfield was closed and dismantled. Today there is no visible evidence of its existence or its exact location.
