= Serretella Airfield =

Italian WWII airfield

Serretella Airfield
- Part of Twelfth Air Force

Site information
- Type: Military airfield
- Controlled by: United States Army Air Forces

Location
- Location of Serretella Airfield, Italy
- Coordinates: 40°36′30.41″N 014°58′57.94″E (Approximate)

Site history
- Built: 1943
- In use: 1943

Serretella Airfield is an abandoned World War II military airfield in southeast Italy, which is located in the vicinity of Battipaglia in the province of Salerno in the Campania region of south-western Italy. Its precise location is undetermined.

It was an all-weather temporary field built by the XII Engineer Command using a graded earth compacted surface, with a prefabricated hessian (burlap) surfacing known as PHS. PHS was made of an asphalt-impregnated jute which was rolled out over the compacted surface over a square mesh track (SMT) grid of wire joined in 3-inch squares. Pierced Steel Planking was also used for parking areas, as well as for dispersal sites, when it was available. In addition, tents were used for billeting and also for support facilities; An access road was built to the existing road infrastructure; a dump for supplies, ammunition, and gasoline drums, along with drinkable water and minimal electrical grid for communications and station lighting.

Once completed it was turned over for use by the United States Army Air Force Twelfth Air Force 86th Bombardment Group from 12 October though 19 November 1943, flying combat operations with A-36 Apaches.

When the 86th moved out the airfield was closed and dismantled. Today, the location of the airfield is undetermined.
