= Marnia Airfield =

Abandoned military airfield in Morocco

Marnia Airfield
- Part of Twelfth Air Force

Site information
- Type: Military airfield
- Controlled by: United States Army Air Forces

Location
- Coordinates: 35°46′11.99″N 005°54′35.21″W

Site history
- Built: May 1943
- In use: June 1943

Location of Marnia Airfield, French Morocco

Marnia Airfield is an abandoned military airfield in Morocco, located approximately 9 km west of Tangier and 37 km north-northeast of Asilah.

== History ==
The airfield was constructed as a temporary facility, with a hard earth or pierced steel planking (PSP) runway and parking apron. with few or no permanent structures, Tents were used for ground support operations and personnel billeting. It was used for a brief two-week period by the Twelfth Air Force 86th Bombardment Group, flying A-20 Havocs from the field in early and mid-June 1943 during the North African Campaign. After the 86th moved east to Tafaraoui Airfield, Algeria, the airfield was dismantled and the land returned to civil authorities.

Today the area where Marnia Airfield was constructed is now an agricultural area, with little or no evidence of its existence.
