= Sele Airfield =

Abandoned World War II military airfield

Sele Airfield
- Part of Twelfth Air Force

Site information
- Type: Military airfield
- Controlled by: United States Army Air Forces

Location
- Coordinates: 40°29′50.63″N 014°56′34.87″E

Site history
- Built: 1943
- In use: 1943

Location of Sele Airfield, Italy

Sele Airfield is an abandoned World War II military airfield in southeast Italy, which is located approximately 15 km northwest of Capaccio in the province of Salerno in the Campania region of south-western Italy. It was a temporary field built by the Army Corps of Engineers used as part of the Salerno landings (Operation Avalanche).

The airfield was primarily used by the United States Army Air Force Twelfth Air Force 86th Bombardment Group from 22 September though 12 October 1943, flying combat operations with A-36 Apaches. As the airfield was very close to the battle lines, for the first week of operations, the group's aircraft were flown to Sicily overnights, then operated from the airfield during the day.

When the 86th moved out the airfield was closed and dismantled. Today, the location of the airfield is visible in aerial photography, with its runway visible. However the remainder of the airfield has been obliterated by agricultural use of the land.
