= Bad Kissingen Airfield =

Bad Kissingen Airfield Daley Barracks
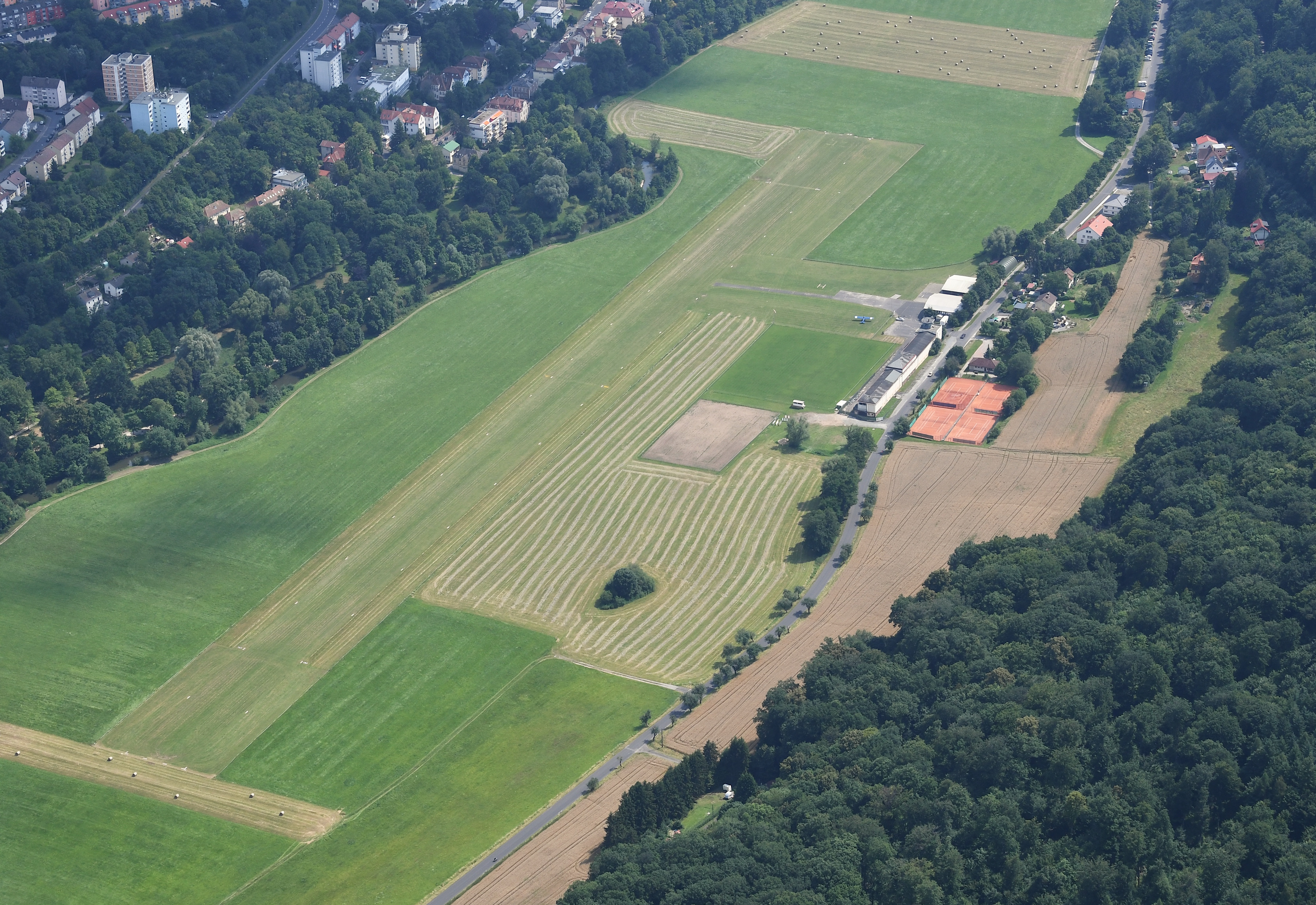
- IATA: none; ICAO: EDFK

Summary
- Airport type: Public
- Location: Bad Kissingen, Germany
- Elevation AMSL: 653 ft / 199 m
- Coordinates: 50°12′39″N 010°04′09″E

Map
- Location of airfield in Bavaria, Germany

Runways
Direction	Length		Surface
Direction	m	ft	Surface
17/35	805	2,641	Grass

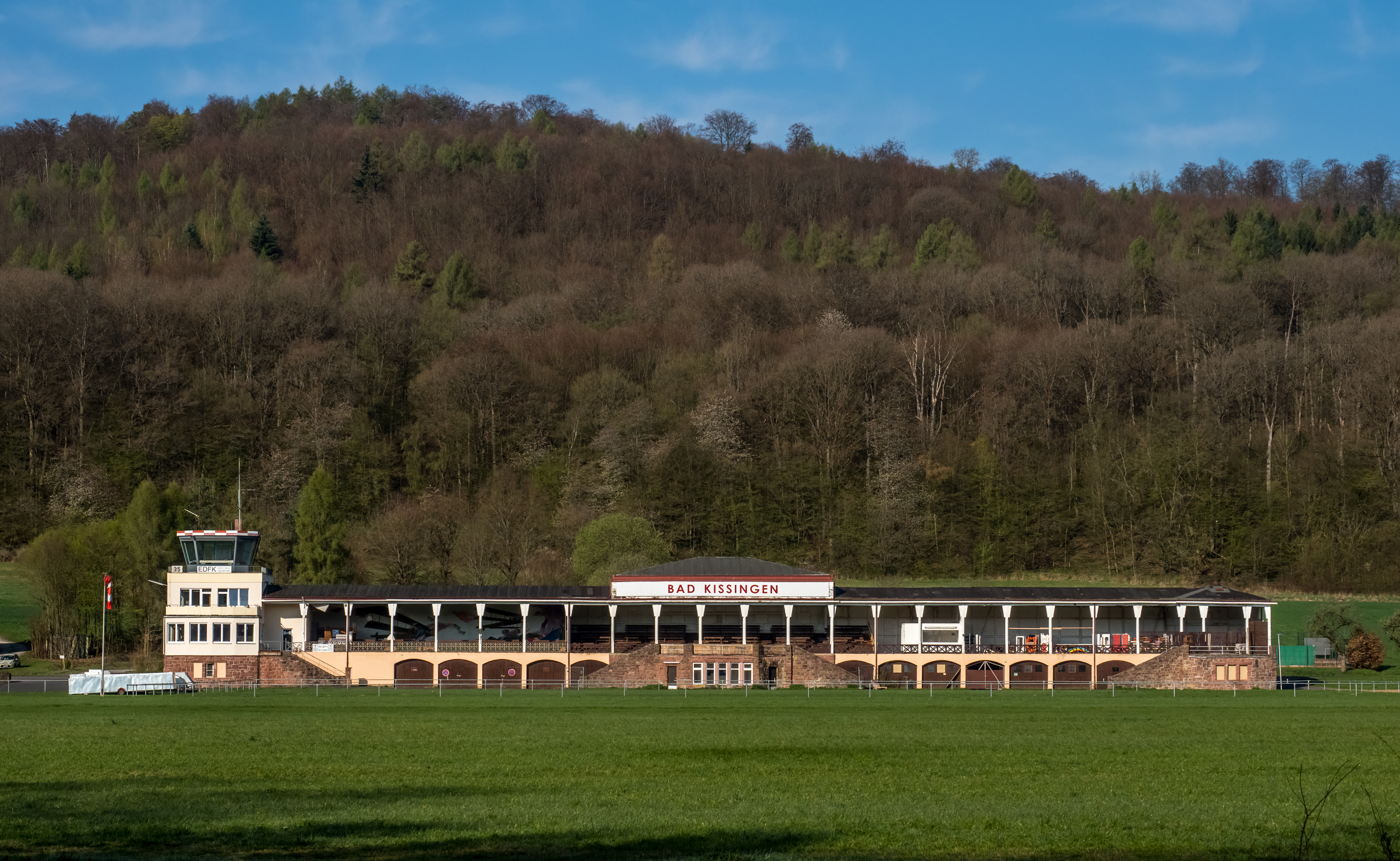
EDFK Tower and Terminal (2017) view from east

Bad Kissingen Airfield (ICAO: EDFK) is an airfield in Germany, located about 1 mile north of Bad Kissingen in Bavaria. It supports general aviation and light aircraft up to by planes of up to 3,000 kg.

== History ==
Bad Kissingen had two different aerodromes.

=== Military airfield ===
The origins of the first airfield, located 3 km east of the city, are in August 1936 when the German Army "Baron von Manteuffel" Kaserne was constructed, parallel to the opening of an airfield as a component of the garrison. During World War II, Bad Kissingen was declared an "open city" and escaped Allied bombing. With all of its sanatoriums, hotels and nursing homes, the city served as a rest center for sick and injured German soldiers. On 7 April 1945, Third US Army troops entered the city without a fight.

The aerodrome was taken over by the United States Army Air Forces in April 1945 as a liaison airfield for the United States occupation forces in the Bad Kissingen area. On 6 June 1945 the Headquarters of Ninth Air Force moved from Chantilly, France to Bad Kissingen. On 1 November 1945, the XII Tactical Air Command moved to Bad Kissingen from Erlangen and replaced the Ninth Air Force. Originally constructed with a Pierced Steel Planking runway, the steel was removed in 1948 and transported to the Berlin area for use in the construction of Tegel Airport.

On 10 November 1947 the XII Tactical Air Command was inactivated at Bad Kissingen. In early 1948, the airfield was turned over to the United States Army. During 1949, an additional 30 acres of land were requisitioned and added to the Kaserne. The PX, Commissary, EM Club, Gym, Bowling Alley were constructed as parts of this addition. Another section was used for an ammunition storage area. In 1950, the grass runway was replaced with a bitumen runway. In 1953, another 23 acres were added to the Kaserne. The additional land was used for construction of dependent housing.

On 17 February 1953, pursuant to GO #1, Hqs USAREUR, Manteuffel Kaserne was redesignated as Daley Barracks in honor of Technician Fifth Grade William T. Daley, HHB, 94th Rcn Sq (Mecz), who was awarded posthumously the Distinguished Service Cross for extraordinary heroism during World War II. Daley Barracks was part of the Manteuffel-Kaserne/Daley Barracks NATO facilities until 1993 when the Americans withdrew from Bad Kissingen after the Cold War ended. Since the closure of the airfield, the area has been used by the German Federal Police as a training area.

The ICAO-Code EDEG had been assigned to this airfield.

=== Civil airfield ===
The local glider club Segelfluggemeinschaft Bad Kissingen constructed a civil airfield approximately 1 km north of the City. A control tower was added to an existing spa building, constructed around 1900, and two hangars were erected. The ICAO-Code EDFK was assigned to the civil airfield.

Until 2017, the aerodrome was regularly used by the Helicopter Rescue Squadron of the State of Bavaria. Today, the airfield is used primarily by local light aircraft and gliders.

== See also ==
- Transport in Germany
- List of airports in Germany
- German (Bavarian) National map M=1:25.000 Bad Kissingen Nord 5726 (1963 and current)
- German (Bavarian) National map M=1:25.000 Bad Kissingen Nord 5726 (1950 and current)
