= Schweinfurt Army Heliport =

Former U.S. military facility in Germany

Schweinfurt Army Heliport Schweinfurt Airfield (R-25)

Site information
- Type: Military Garrison

Location
- Coordinates: 50°02′58″N 010°10′09″E

Site history
- Built: 1936
- Built by: Luftwaffe
- In use: 1936-1945 (Luftwaffe); Apr 1945-October 1947 (USAAF); Oct 1947--2014 (United States Army)

Location of Schweinfurt Army Heliport, Germany

Schweinfurt Army Heliport was a military facility near Schweinfurt, that was part of U.S. Army Garrison Schweinfurt.

== History ==
The facility's origins begin in 1936 as a Luftwaffe airfield, its primary mission being the home of light bomber (Dornier Do 17) and dive bomber (Junkers Ju 87) units until 1942.

About 1940, the Luftwaffe began assigning anti-aircraft (FlaK) units to the area, in order to provide an air defense for the Schweinfurter Kugellagerwerke and other ball bearing factories in Schweinfurt, as the city produced most of these critical components. The number of units assigned increased when the city became the target of American Eighth Air Force strategic bombing beginning in 1943. Schweinfurt was bombed 22 times during Operation Pointblank by a total of 2285 aircraft. American bombing included the Second Raid on Schweinfurt on October 14, 1943, ("Black Thursday") and Big Week in February, 1944.

The United States Army 42nd Infantry Division entered Schweinfurt on 11 April 1945 and conducted house-to-house fighting in the seizure of the city and facilities. Twelfth Air Force B-25 Mitchell medium bombers conducted pinpoint bombing attacks during the battle on German defenses, the battle being one of the last (in addition to Nuremberg) major combat between the German Wehrmacht against American Army units during the Western Allied invasion of Germany. Elements of the USAAF IX Engineering Command were able to move into the airfield on 17 April and clear mines and destroyed aircraft, and made the facility serviceable for use by Allied transport aircraft by 18 April. It was designated as Advanced Landing Ground "R-25" and was put to use as a combat resupply and casualty evacuation airfield.

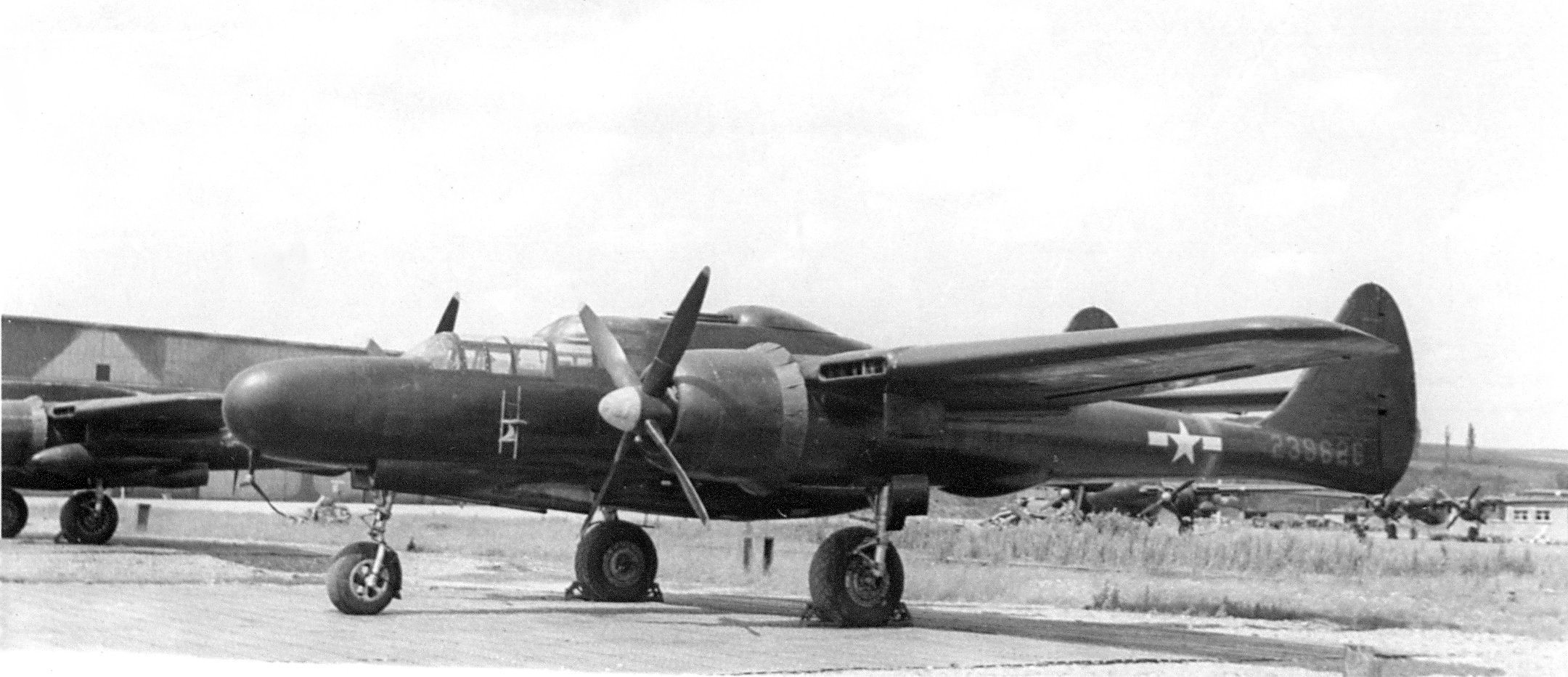
The 417th Night Fighter Squadron with P-61 Black Widows was disbanded in Schweinfurt at the beginning of Nov 1946

P-61 ‘Midnight-Menace’ at Schweinfurt, 417th NFS, August 20 – November 9, 1946

Air Force Occupation units began moving into the airfield on 16 June 1945, the facility being renamed Army Air Force Station Schweinfurt. The airfield became an occupation garrison for Air Force units and also became "Schweinfurt Air Depot", being used by Air Technical Service Command. It was redesignated as Schweinfurt Air Base on 1 August 1947, in anticipation of the Air Force becoming a separate branch of the U.S. Armed Forces. On 5 October 1947, control of the airfield was turned over to the United States Army as the Air Force consolidated its forces around the Munich area.

Shortly before closure, the U.S. Army Garrison Schweinfurt was home for roughly 11,000 people, including about 4,000 Soldiers, family members, Department of Defense civilian employees and their dependents, with the heliport being assigned to the Conn Barracks facilities. The installation was closed on September 19, 2014, following a round of base closures in Europe.

== See also ==
- Advanced Landing Ground
