= Tantonville Airfield =

World War II United States military airfield in France

Tantonville Airfield Advanced Landing Ground (ALG) Y-1
- Lorraine Region, France

Site information
- Type: Military airfield
- Controlled by: United States Army Air Forces

Location
- Coordinates: 48°27′30.48″N 006°09′05.70″E

Site history
- Built: Early 1945
- In use: February–April 1945
- Battles/wars: Southern France Campaign

Tantonville Airfield is an abandoned World War II United States Army Air Forces military airfield in France, which was located in the Département de Meurthe-et-Moselle approximately 18 kilometres (11 mi) north of Mirecourt and 18 kilometres (11 mi) south-southeast of Neuves-Maisons.

== History ==
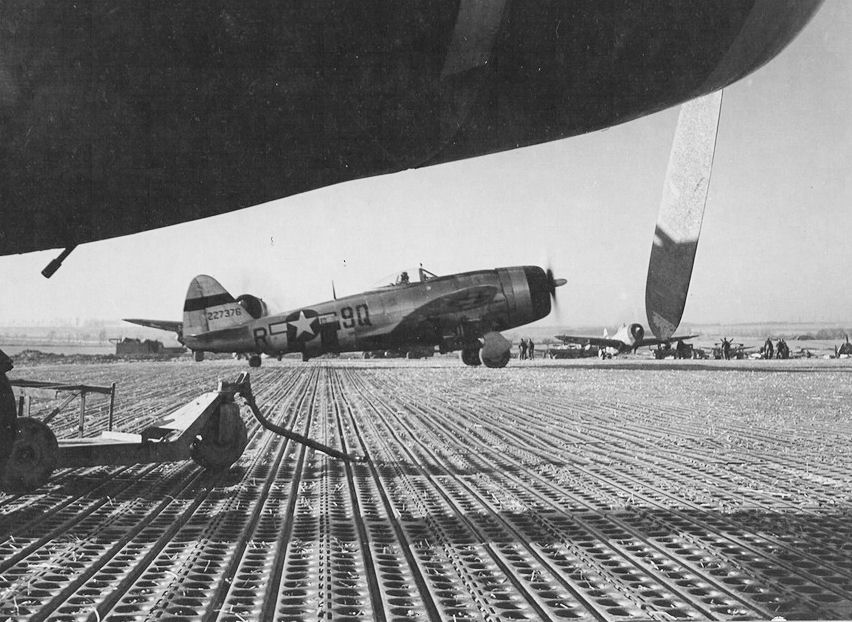
P-47D-27-RE Thunderbolt 404th Fighter Squadron, 371st Fighter Group, 9th Air Force Taken at: Tantonville Airfield (Y-1), France, 12 January 1945

The airfield was constructed by the IX Engineer Command as a temporary facility, with a 5000' x 120' all weather pierced steel planking (PSP) runway, aligned 01/19. In addition the airfield contained a large parking apron, as well as for dispersal sites. Tents were used for billeting and also for support facilities; an access road was built to the existing road infrastructure; a dump for supplies, ammunition, and gasoline drums, along with a drinkable water and minimal electrical grid for communications and station lighting. It was known as Tantonville Airfield or Advanced Landing Ground Y-1 and released to Ninth Air Force on 25 December 1944.

The XIX Tactical Air Command 100th Fighter Wing 371st Fighter Group moved onto the field even before it was officially completed on 20 December, with three squadrons of P-47 Thunderbolts. They remained until 15 February until moving east.

The Twelfth Air Force 86th Fighter Group and its 525th, 526th, and 527th Squadrons operated P-47 Thunderbolts from the airfield between late February to mid-April 1945 before moving east to a captured Luftwaffe airfield at Braunshardt, Germany (Y-72) near Darmstadt.

After the 86th moved out the airfield was manned by the 98th Service Squadron. It was used as a resupply and casualty evacuation airfield for the balance of the war. It was then dismantled and the land returned to civil authorities on 11 May 1945. The area where Tantonville Airfield was constructed is now an agricultural area, although the ground still shows evidence of its runway and parking apron.

== See also ==
- Advanced Landing Ground
