= Adlai H. Gilkeson =

US Air Force general (1893–1959)

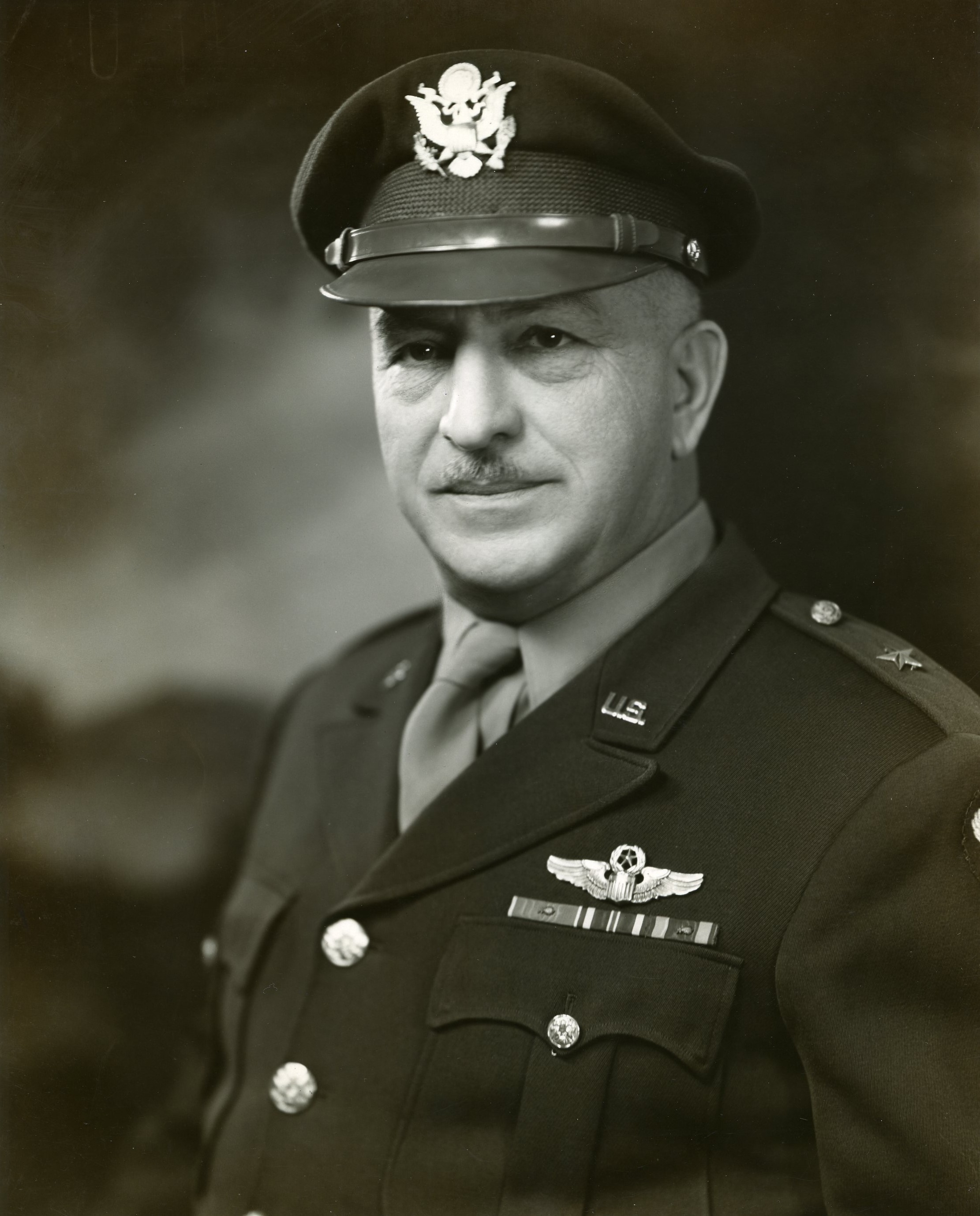
- Born: January 25, 1893; Lansdale, Pennsylvania
- Died: November 2, 1959 (aged 66); Andrews Air Force Base, Maryland
- Burial place: Arlington National Cemetery
- Spouse: Marguerite Gilkeson
- Children: Thomas Andrew Gilkeson
- Military career
- Allegiance: United States
- Branch: United States Army; United States Air Force
- Service years: 1915–1953
- Rank: Brigadier General
- Commands: 19th Bombardment Wing; 312th Fighter Wing; III Fighter Command; XXVI Interceptor Command; 12th Pursuit Wing; 8th Pursuit Group
- Conflicts: Pancho Villa Expedition; World War II
- Awards: Legion of Merit (4); Distinguished Flying Cross; Air Medal (2)

Adlai Howard Gilkeson (January 25, 1893 – November 2, 1959) was an American brigadier general who was a four-time Legion of Merit recipient.

== Biography ==
=== Early life ===
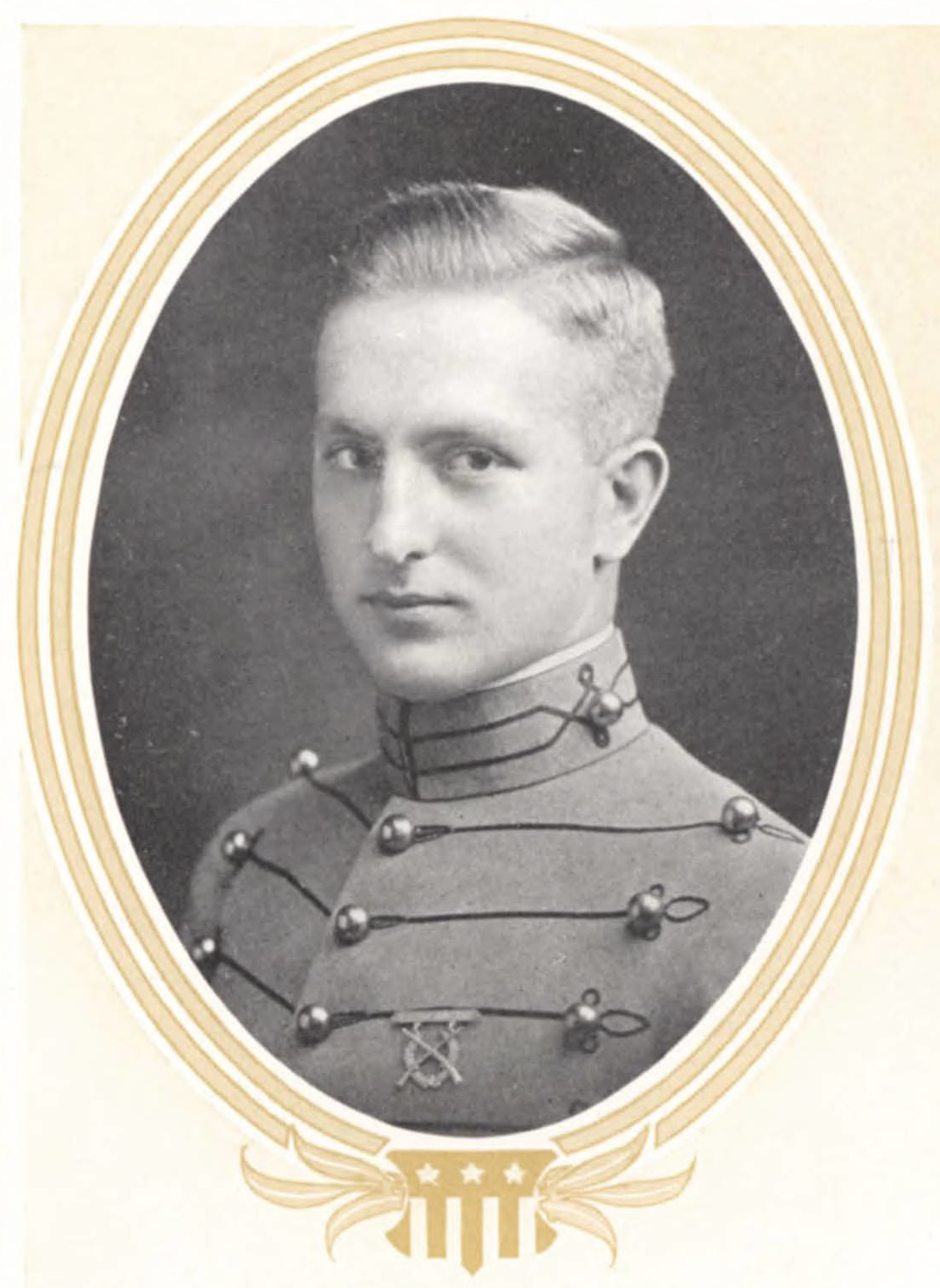
At West Point in 1915

Gilkeson was born on January 25, 1893, in Lansdale, Pennsylvania. When he graduated from the United States Military Academy at West Point, New York, he became a second lieutenant on June 12, 1915 as part of the class the stars fell on. For a whole year he served at Douglas, Arizona, in 11th Infantry Regiment. In May 1917, he joined Signal corps at the Signal Corps Aviation School in San Diego, California and later on, the same year, joined 1st Aero Squadron at Columbus, New Mexico. On June 20, 1917, he was given a title as Junior Military Aviator and till September was a commandant of the School of Military Aeronautics at Princeton University, New Jersey. From September 1917 to January 1918 Gilkeson was stationed in Chanute Field, Illinois, after which he was transferred to the Rich Field, Texas, where he worked as Engineer Officer. From April to August 1918 he worked as duty officer of flying at Wilbur Wright Field, Ohio, after which her returned to Chanute Field where he stayed till January 1919.

=== Philippines ===
When he was reassigned to Aberdeen Proving Ground, Maryland, he became a commander of the 217th Aero Squadron which he was in charge of till April 1919. He then served at Hazelhurst Field, New York till he joined the 60th Infantry at Camp Gordon, Georgia, by October of the same year. From August 1920 to July 1921 he was an Executive officer at Carlstrom Field, Florida, after which the same year he sailed to the Philippines, and later on came back to Crissy Field. When he finished with his two-year duty in the Philippines where he served as a commanding officer of both Clark Field and 3rd Pursuit Squadron, he came back to the United States and became Professor of Military Science and Tactics at the MIT.

=== Graduation from various colleges ===
As a student, Gilkeson was very detailed, therefore from September to November 1925 he was sent to the Chemical Warfare School at Edgewood Arsenal where he stayed till June 1928 as a Liaison officer for the United States Army Air Corps. In July 1929, he graduated from Air Corps Engineering School at Wright Field, Ohio, after which he became a chief of the Equipment Branch at the Air Corps Materiel Division in September 1931. As soon as he graduated from Air Corps Tactical School at Maxwell Field in June 1932, he worked with the 1st Pursuit Group at Selfridge Field, Michigan, as both an Executive officer and as a duty officer. For a year and a month he was serving duty at the Civilian Conservation Corps as well.

From November 1934 to March 1935, he was sent to Fort Sam Houston, where he worked with the United States Army Reserve and the VIII Corps. During the same month he also became a commander of the 8th Pursuit Group at Langley Field. There, in September 1938, he attended Command and General Staff School at Fort Leavenworth, Kansas and from which he graduated in June 1939. After the graduation he worked at the Albrook Field, Panama Canal Zone where he was in charge of an air base and the same year took command of the 12th Pursuit Wing.

=== World War II ===
During the War, he was a Commanding General of the XXVI Interceptor Command from March 1942 and in October 1942 became Commanding General of the III Fighter Command. When China Burma India Theater broke out in March 1944, he was stationed at Chengdu, China where he was in charge of the 312th Fighter Wing. In October 1944, Gilkeson served with Tenth Air Force in Burma where he was in charge of all air operations precisely driving Japanese out of North Burma and even creating Ledo Road from Burma to China by bombardment. For his wartime service, he received two awards of the Legion of Merit, one Distinguished Flying Cross and two Air Medals.

=== Later life ===
After the war, Gilkeson became a U.S. Air Force officer. At the age of 55, he qualified as a jet pilot. In late 1949, Gilkeson assumed command of the 19th Bombardment Wing in Guam. In 1951 and 1953, he received two additional awards of the Legion of Merit. Gilkeson retired from active duty on January 31, 1953.

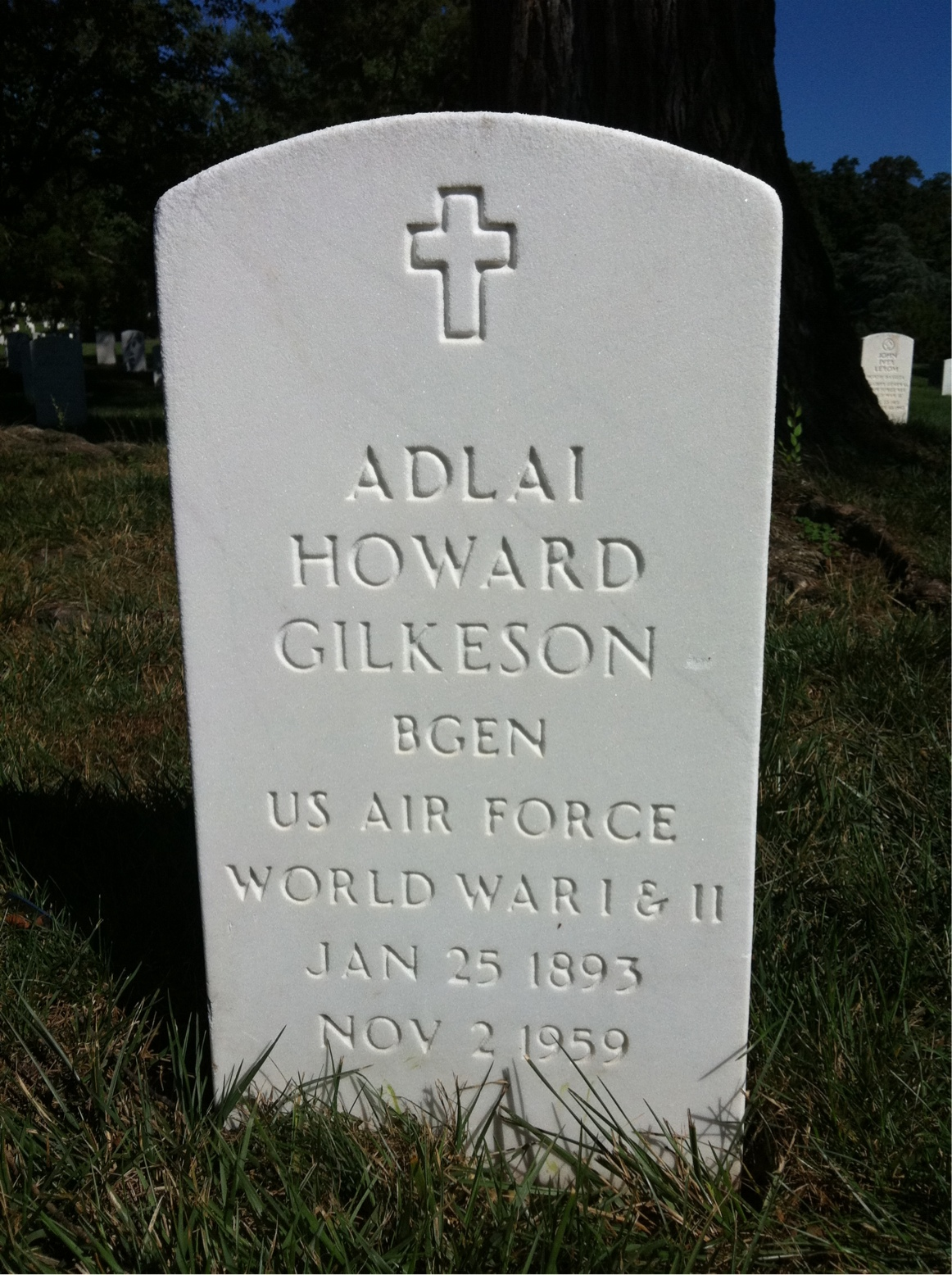
Gilkeson's grave at Arlington Cemetery

Gilkeson died at Andrews Air Force Base Hospital on November 2, 1959. He was interred at Arlington National Cemetery three days later.
