= 12th Missile Squadron =

US Air Force unit

12th Missile Squadron

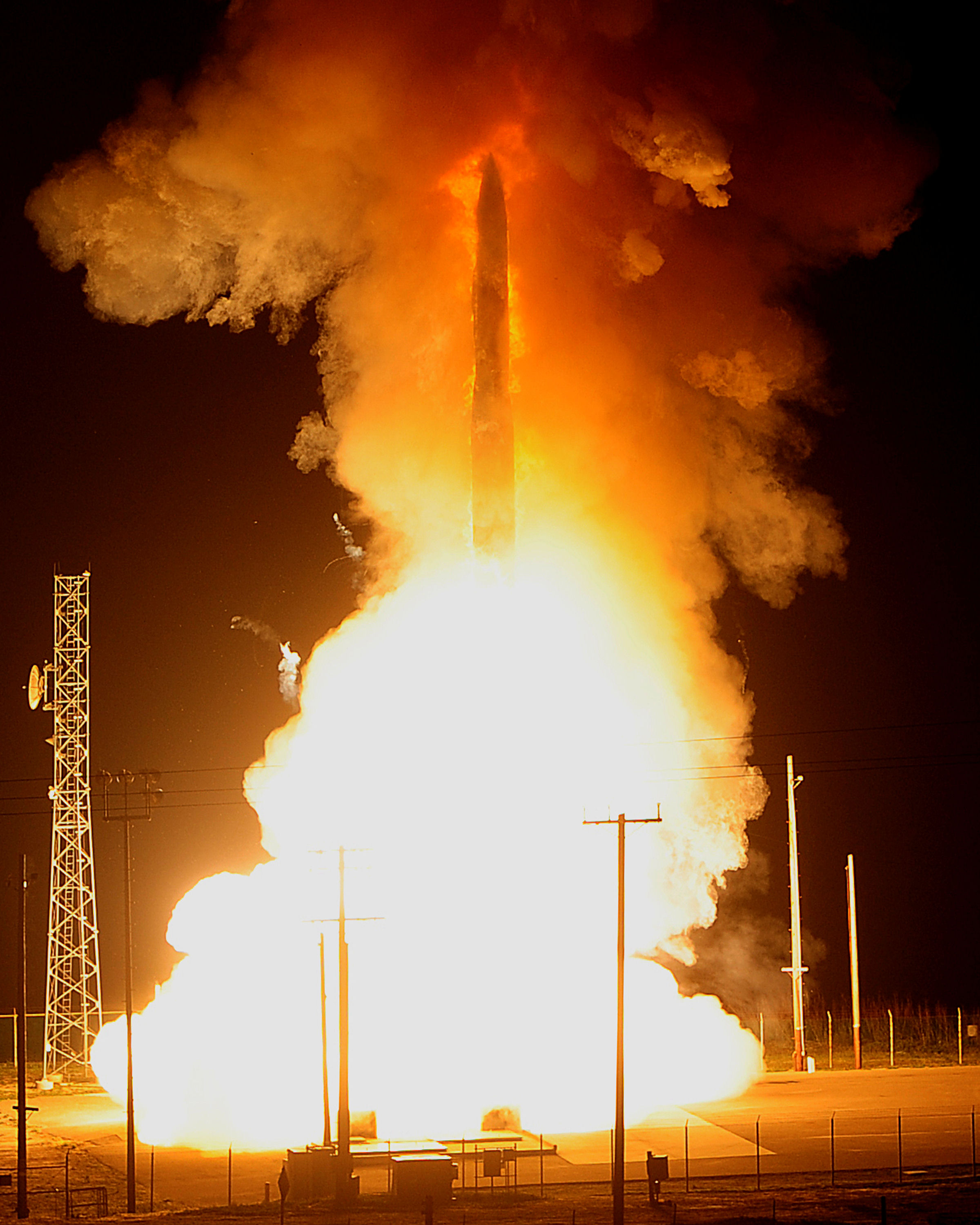
- LGM-30G Minuteman III test launch at Vandenberg AFB, California
- Active: 1940–1944; 1947–1949; 1955–1961; 1961–present
- Country: United States
- Branch: United States Air Force
- Type: Squadron
- Role: Intercontinental ballistic missile
- Part of: Air Force Global Strike Command
- Garrison/HQ: Malmstrom Air Force Base, Montana
- Engagements: World War II (Antisubmarine Campaign)
- Decorations: Air Force Outstanding Unit Award

Insignia
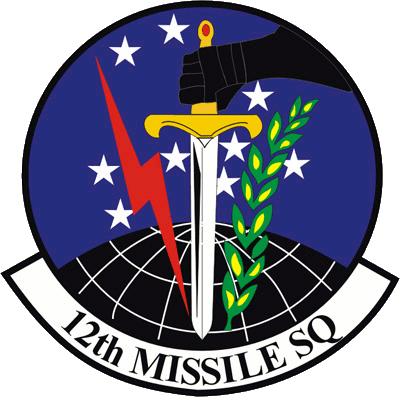
- 12th Strategic Missile Squadron emblem (Note: Description: On a disc of celeste (light blue) sky spattered with white stars, the top of the globe issuing from base black, grid lines white. Over all a dark gray mailed hand issuing from sinister chief, outlines and highlights white, details celeste, grasping a sword in pale, point to base, hilt and pommel Air Force golden yellow, blade white, shaded celeste, outlines and details dark gray, a red oval spot on the pommel, all between a red lightning flash edged white and a green olive branch, details Air Force golden yellow, pilewise. The date on which the emblem was reconfigured from a shield to a disc is not recorded.)

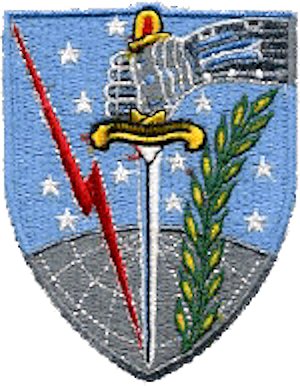
- Patch with 12th Bombardment Squadron emblem (Note: Approved 5 August 1957.)

The 12th Missile Squadron is a United States Air Force unit. It is assigned to the 341st Operations Group, stationed at Malmstrom Air Force Base, Montana. The squadron is equipped with the LGM-30G Minuteman III intercontinental ballistic missile, with a mission of nuclear deterrence.

== Mission ==
The mission of the 341st Missile Wing is to provide combat-ready people and aerospace forces.

== History ==
=== World War II ===
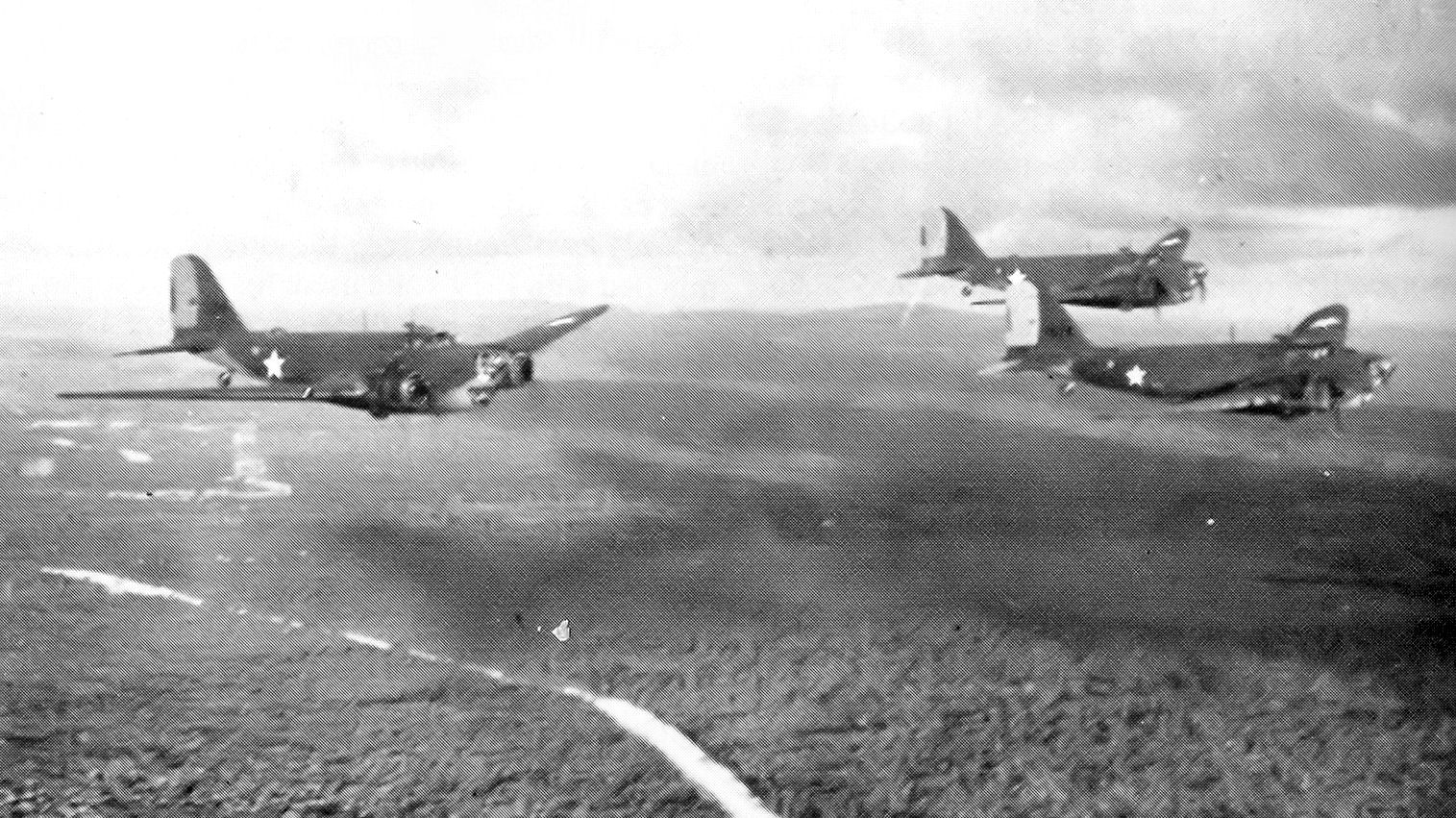
B-18s of the 12th Bombardment Squadron flying over British Guiana

The 12th Bombardment Squadron was organized and activated at Langley Field, Virginia on 1 February 1940, as a member of the 25th Bombardment Group. The unit moved from Langley where it trained initially, to Borinquen Field, Puerto Rico, where it became part of Caribbean Air Force on 1 November 1940. Following the initial deployment to Puerto Rico. The squadron participated in various training and familiarization flights with its small complement of Douglas B-18 Bolo medium bombers, until 8 November 1941 when it was ordered to deploy to Benedict Field, St. Croix, temporarily until September 1942, then at St. Nicholas, and Antigua.

Following the Pearl Harbor Attack, the squadron commenced operations out of Benedict with its tiny force of three B-18s. However, these were exchanged for four slightly more capable B-18As by 16 January 1942. By mid-February, these had been augmented by a further B-18 (while one of the B-18As was away at the Mobile Air Depot being fitted with one of the earliest airborne radar systems) and the squadron had a total of four crews, three of whom had more than 12 months experience. Operations continued out of Benedict Field until 10 October 1942, when it moved to Dakota Field, Aruba, and the following month came under the operational control of the Antilles Air Task Force and VI Fighter Command. By 11 December, the unit had six B-18Bs and four Douglas A-20A Havocs while Flight D of the squadron was at distant Borinquen Field with two further B-18Bs and a B-18. Apparently this aircraft dispersal proved too much for the unit to handle and, by January 1943, strength on report had dropped to a more reasonable total of just five B-18Bs and a single B-18C at Dakota Field, although Flight D remained at Borinquen as late as June, and Flight C moved from Dakota to Rio Hato Field, Panama, from 1 June till 20 July 1943. In addition, several 59th Bombardment Squadron aircraft were attached to the 12th at this point, as were two Bell P-39D Airacobras of the 22d Pursuit Squadron.

All of this shuffling of aircraft was due, of course, to the exigencies of the antisubmarine campaign, which had been re-initiated in early January 1943. By October 1943, operational control of the now very experienced unit had passed to Commander, All Forces, Aruba and Curaçao (CAFAC), and the United States Navy assumed command and the unit, together with the Lockheed PV-1 Venturas of a Navy unit there provided continuous coverage for, amongst others, convoy GAT94 and its route from the time it entered the area.

As the anti-submarine war continuously shifted, the squadron moved to follow, leaving Dakota Field on 23 November to move to Coolidge Field on Antigua, at which time its attachment to CAFAC ended. While there, it provided continuous coverage for Convoy TAG95. By the end of December, the unit had started to reequip, and had two of the B-18Bs, but also three North American B-25D Mitchells and not fewer than 12 B-25Gs at Coolidge.

As the antisubmarine campaign eased, the unit became, essentially, a crew training outfit, although patrols were still flown in conjunction with this tasking. The Squadron ended its Caribbean tour on 24 March 1944 when it was transferred back to the United States and became a B-25 Mitchell Operational Training Unit at Alamogordo Army Air Field, New Mexico. On 20 June 1944, the 12th Bombardment Squadron was disbanded.

=== Reserve operations ===
The squadron was reactivated in July 1947 as a reserve unit at Westover Field (later Westover Air Force Base), Massachusetts, where it was assigned to the 341st Bombardment Group. In October, the squadron moved to Bradley Field, Connecticut. It was not equipped with operational aircraft, but flew North American AT-6 Texan and Beechcraft AT-11 Kansan trainer aircraft. Its training was supervised by the 108th AAF Base Unit (later 108th AF Base Unit, 2227th Air Force Reserve Training Center) of Air Defense Command (ADC). In 1948 Continental Air Command assumed responsibility for managing reserve and Air National Guard units from ADC. President Truman’s reduced 1949 defense budget required reductions in the number of units in the Air Force, and the 12th was inactivated in June 1949.

=== Strategic Air Command bomber operations ===
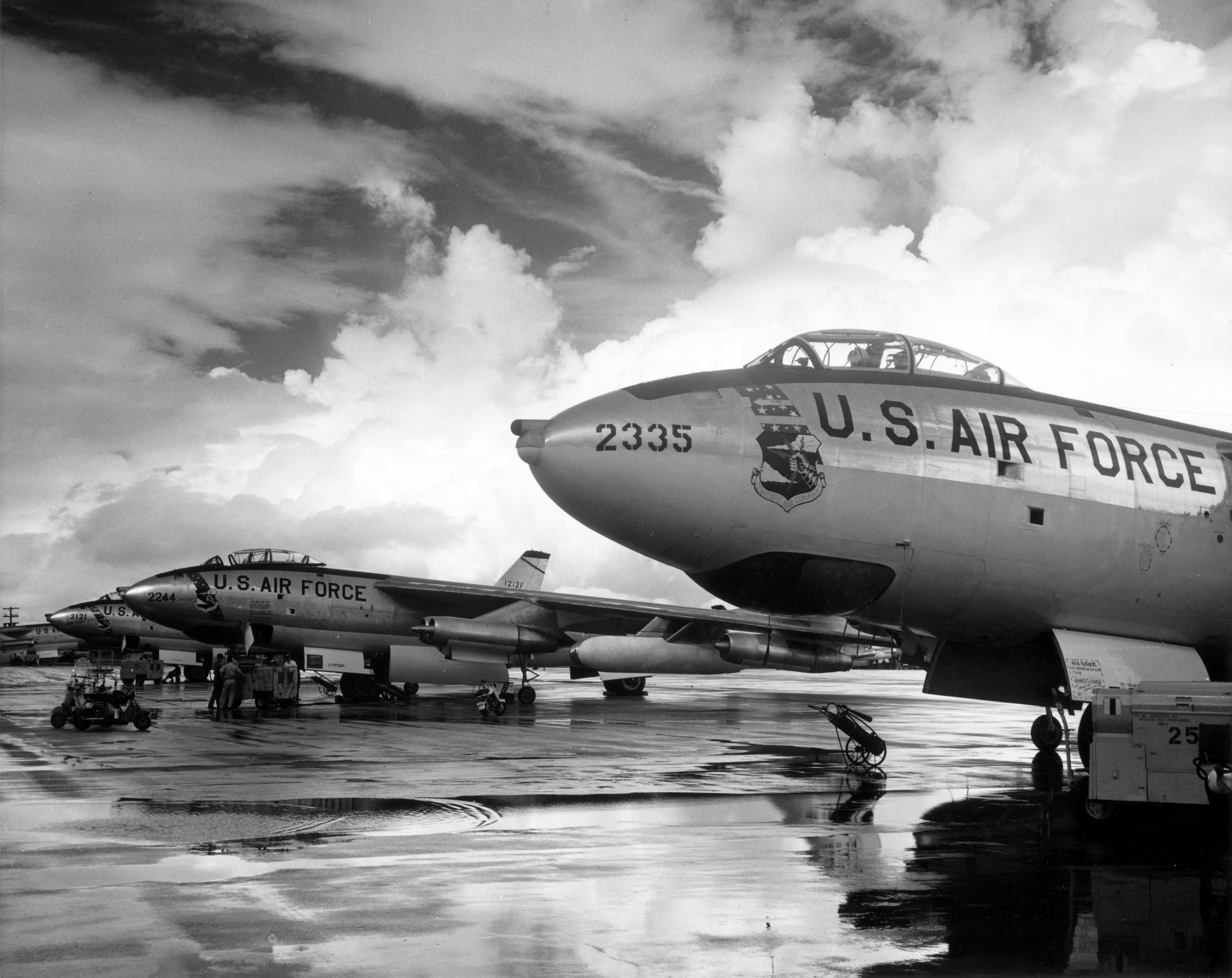
SAC B-47 Stratojets

The squadron was activated at Abilene Air Force Base, Texas on 1 September 1955, as the Air Force reopened it as a Strategic Air Command (SAC) base for Boeing B-47 Stratojet bombers. The squadron trained in strategic bombardment operations with the B-47 and participated in SAC exercises and operations. From January through April 1958, the squadron deployed with the 341st Bombardment Wing to Andersen Air Force Base, Guam. Shortly thereafter, its planes went through Project Milk Bottle to strengthen their wings for low level operations. The squadron also participated in Operation Reflex alert operations. Reflex placed Stratojets and Boeing KC-97s at bases closer to the Soviet Union for 90 day periods, although individuals rotated back to home bases during unit Reflex deployments.

Starting in 1958, SAC's B-47 wings of began to assume an alert posture at their home bases, reducing the amount of time spent on alert at overseas bases. General Thomas S. Power’s initial goal was to maintain one third of SAC's planes on fifteen minute ground alert, fully fueled and ready for combat to reduce vulnerability to a Soviet missile strike. Its last Reflex deployment ended on 15 July 1959. (Note: However, a later wing history indicated that the 341st Wing continued to deploy some B-47s to the United Kingdom as late as April 1960. No byline (1 April 1960). "Abstract, 341 Bombardment Wing Maintenance Analysis Report". Air Force History Index.) In April 1961, the squadron began drawing down in preparation for inactivation and was inactivated on 25 June 1961, transferring its aircraft to other SAC wings.

=== Intercontinental ballistic missile squadron ===
Organized on 1 March 1962 as the 12th Strategic Missile Squadron, an intercontinental ballistic missile squadron assigned to the 341st Missile Wing at Malmstrom Air Force Base, Montana. Initially equipped with 50 LGM-30A Minuteman Is in early 1962. "Upon organization, it became the second Minuteman ICBM squadron in the Air Force. During the mid-1960s the 12th replaced its 50 Minuteman I missiles with Minuteman IIs. The 12th was the first squadron at Malmstrom to undergo weapon system upgrade to Minuteman Mod; and on [22 April] 1967, it was the first squadron to become fully operational with the new Minuteman II missiles under this program. The 12th was also the first squadron in the wing to undergo silo upgrade. By 1978, the Improved Launch Control System had replaced the Minuteman Mod system and the 12th SMS once again had the state-of-the-art weapon system."

"In 1994, the 12 reorganized under the objective squadron concept. This reorganization took the three combat disciplines, ICBM operations, security police, and electromechanical maintenance, and combined them under the "one hat" of the missile squadron commander. In early June 1995, electromechanical Maintenance returned to the 341st Logistics Group."

The 12th Missile Squadron led the way in removing Minuteman II missiles and replacing them with LGM-30G Minuteman III silos from the inactivating 321st Missile Wing at Grand Forks Air Force Base, North Dakota in 1996; Minuteman IIs being retired. The new missile enhances capability, increases flexibility, and marks yet another system upgrade.

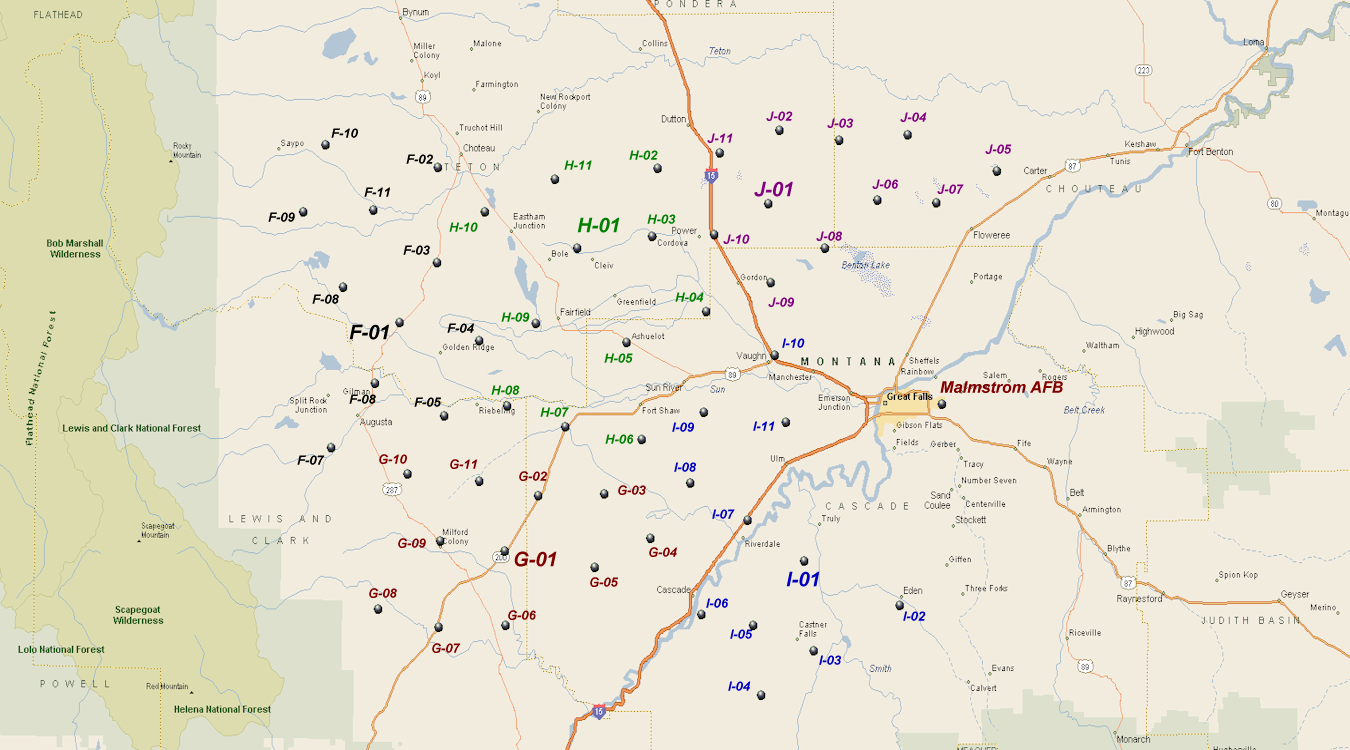
LGM-30 Minuteman Missile Alert and Launch Facilities

Missile Alert Facilities (F-J flights, each controlling 10 missiles) are located as follows:

F-01 8.6 mi NxNE of Augusta MT, 47°36′17″N 112°18′38″W
G-01 13.8 mi SW of Simms MT, 47°19′32″N 112°05′39″W
H-01 5.9 mi NxNE of Fairfield MT,47°41′48″N 111°56′33″W
I-01 11.0 mi ExNE of Cascade MT, 47°18′45″N 111°28′25″W
J-01 7.0 mi ExNE of Power MT, 47°45′06″N 111°32′46″W

== Lineage ==
- Constituted as the 12th Bombardment Squadron (Heavy) on 22 December 1939

Activated on 1 February 1940

- Redesignated 12th Bombardment Squadron (Medium) on 7 May 1942
- Redesignated 12th Bombardment Squadron, Medium on 21 September 1943

Disbanded on 20 June 1944

- Reconstituted and redesignated 12th Bombardment Squadron, Light on 10 March 1947

Activated in the reserve on 24 July 1947
Inactivated on 27 June 1949

- Redesignated 12th Bombardment Squadron, Medium on 7 June 1955

Activated on 1 September 1955
Discontinued and inactivated on 25 June 1961

- Redesignated 12th Strategic Missile Squadron (ICBM-Minuteman) and activated on 22 September 1961 (not organized)

Organized on 1 March 1962

- Redesignated 12th Missile Squadron on 1 September 1991

=== Assignments ===
- 25th Bombardment Group, 1 February 1940 – 20 June 1944 (under operational control of Antilles Air Task Force and VI Fighter Command, 1 November 1942 – 20 June 1944)
- 341st Bombardment Group, 24 July 1947 – 27 June 1949
- 341st Bombardment Wing, 1 September 1955 – 25 June 1961
- Strategic Air Command, 22 September 1961 (not organized)
- 341st Strategic Missile Wing, 1 March 1962
- 341st Operations Group, 1 September 1991 – present

=== Stations ===
- Langley Field, Virginia, 1 February – 26 October 1940
- Borinquen Field, Puerto Rico, 1 November 1940
- Benedict Field, St Croix, c. 8 November 1941
- Dakota Field, Aruba, c. 10 October 1942

Detachment operated from Borinquen Field, Puerto Rico, c. November 1942 – 23 November 1943

- Coolidge Field, Antigua, 23 November 1943 – 24 March 1944
- Alamogordo Army Air Field, New Mexico, 6 April – 20 June 1944
- Westover Field (later Westover Air Force Base), Massachusetts, 24 July 1947
- Bradley Field, Connecticut, 24 October 1947 – 27 June 1949
- Abilene Air Force Base (later Dyess Air Force Base), Texas, 1 September 1955 – 25 June 1961

Deployed at Andersen Air Force Base, Guam, 9 January – c. 4 April 1958

- Malmstrom Air Force Base, Montana, 1 March 1962 – present

=== Aircraft and missiles ===
- Douglas B-18 Bolo, 1940–1944
- North American B-25 Mitchell, 1943–1944
- North American AT-6 Texan, 1947–1949
- Beechcraft AT-11 Kansan, 1947–1949
- Boeing B-47 Stratojet, 1956–1961
- LGM-30A/B Minuteman I, 1962–1968
- LGM-30F Minuteman II, 1968–1991
- LGM-30G Minuteman III, 1996 – present

=== Awards and campaigns ===
Award streamer	Award	Dates	Notes
	Air Force Outstanding Unit Award	22 October 1962 – 31 December 1963	12th Strategic Missile Squadron
	Air Force Outstanding Unit Award	1 July 1975 – 30 June 1976	12th Strategic Missile Squadron
	Air Force Outstanding Unit Award	1 July 1976 – 30 June 1977	12th Strategic Missile Squadron
	Air Force Outstanding Unit Award	1 July 1979 – 30 June 1981	12th Strategic Missile Squadron
	Air Force Outstanding Unit Award	1 July 1988 – 30 June 1990	12th Strategic Missile Squadron
	Air Force Outstanding Unit Award	1 July 1990 – 30 June 1991	12th Strategic Missile Squadron
	Air Force Outstanding Unit Award	1 September 1991 – 31 August 1993	12th Missile Squadron
	Air Force Outstanding Unit Award	1 September 1993 – 31 August 1994	12th Missile Squadron
	Air Force Outstanding Unit Award	1 September 1994 – 31 August 1995	12th Missile Squadron
	Air Force Outstanding Unit Award	1 October 1995 – 30 September 1996	12th Missile Squadron
	Air Force Outstanding Unit Award	1 October 1997 – 30 September 1999	12th Missile Squadron
	Air Force Outstanding Unit Award	1 October 1998 – 30 September 1999	12th Missile Squadron
	Air Force Outstanding Unit Award	1 October 2000 – 30 September 2002	12th Missile Squadron
	Air Force Outstanding Unit Award	1 October 2002 – 1 October 2003	12th Missile Squadron
	Air Force Outstanding Unit Award	1 January 2003 – 31 December 2003	12th Missile Squadron
	Air Force Outstanding Unit Award	1 October 2004 – 30 September 2006	12th Missile Squadron
	Air Force Outstanding Unit Award	1 October 2006 – 30 September 2008	12th Missile Squadron
	Air Force Outstanding Unit Award	1 October 2008 – 30 September 2009	12th Missile Squadron
	Air Force Outstanding Unit Award	1 October 2010 – 31 December 2011	12th Missile Squadron
	Air Force Outstanding Unit Award	1 January 2015 – 31 December 2015	12th Missile Squadron

Campaign Streamer	Campaign	Dates	Notes
	Antisubmarine	7 December 1941 – 1 August 1943	12th Bombardment Squadron

== See also ==
- List of United States Air Force missile squadrons
