= Trinidad Wing, Antilles Air Command =

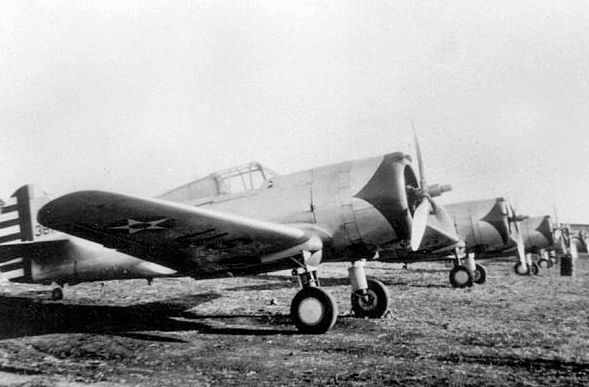
- VI fighter Command aircraft in Puerto Rico, 1941
- Active: 1941-1944
- Country: United States
- Branch: United States
- Role: Command of air defense units

The Trinidad Wing, Antilles Air Command is an inactive United States Air Force unit. Its last assignment was with Antilles Air Command at Waller Field, Trinidad. It was disbanded on 15 March 1944.

== History ==
Engaged in antisubmarine operations.

== Lineage ==
- Constituted as the 6th Interceptor Command on 17 October 1941 (Note: Maurer indicates that the unit was constituted as the "VI" Interceptor Command. However, the unit was constituted and activated with an arabic number in its name. The use of roman numerals to designate Army Air Forces combat commands did not begin until September 1942. "Air Force Historical Research Agency Organizational Reconds: Types of USAF Organizations". Air Force History Index. 9 January 2008.)

Activated on 25 October 1941
Redesignated 6th Fighter Command 15 May 1942
Redesignated VI Fighter Command c. 18 September 1942
Redesignated Trinidad Wing, Antilles Air Command in October 1943.
Disbanded on 15 March 1944

=== Assignments ===
- Sixth Air Force, 17 October 1941 – 1942
- Unknown, 1942 – 1 March 1943
- Antilles Air Task Force (later Antilles Air Command), 1 March 1943 – 15 March 1944

=== Stations ===
- Borinquen Field, Puerto Rico, 25 October 1941
- Henry Barracks, Puerto Rico, 20 March 1943
- Waller Field, Trinidad, 15 May 1943 – 15 March 1944

=== Units assigned ===
Wing

- 12 Pursuit Wing, 25 October 1941 – 6 March 1942

Groups

- 9th Bombardment Group: attached 28 January – c. 31 October 1942
- 36th Fighter Group: 25 October 1941 – 4 June 1943
- 40th Bombardment Group: attached 15 January 1942; assigned 6 April – 22 June 1942

Squadrons

- 12th Bombardment Squadron: 1 November 1942 – 24 July 1943 (Under Operational Control)
- 59th Bombardment Squadron: 21 July 1942 – 19 March 1943 (Attached to Trinidad Detachment)
