= 101st Bombardment (Photographic) Squadron =

United States Air Force unit

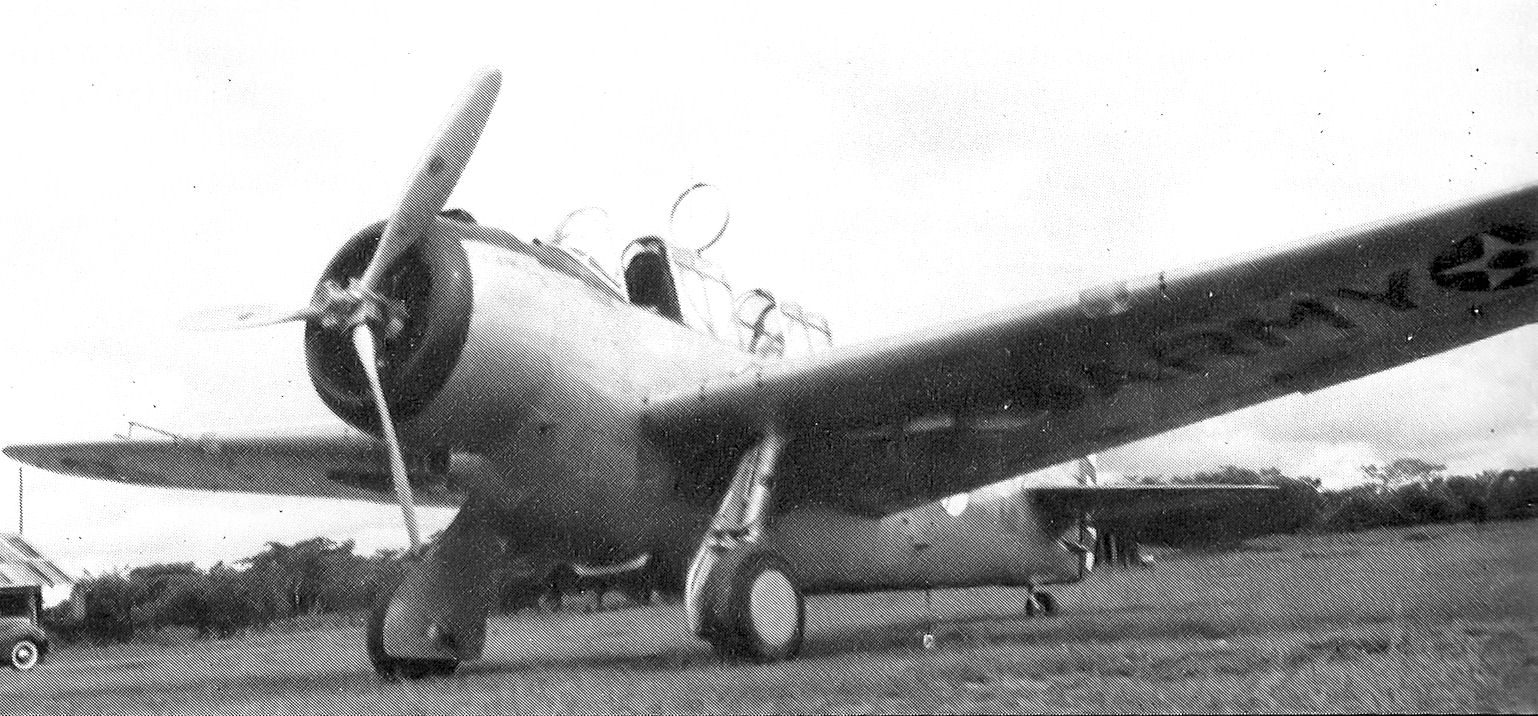
- 39th Observation Squadron North American O-47A France Field Canal Zone 1941
- Active: 1917–1948
- Disbanded: 8 October 1948
- Country: United States
- Branch: United States Air Force
- Role: Photographic Reconnaissance
- Size: Squadron
- Engagements: World War I World War II

Insignia
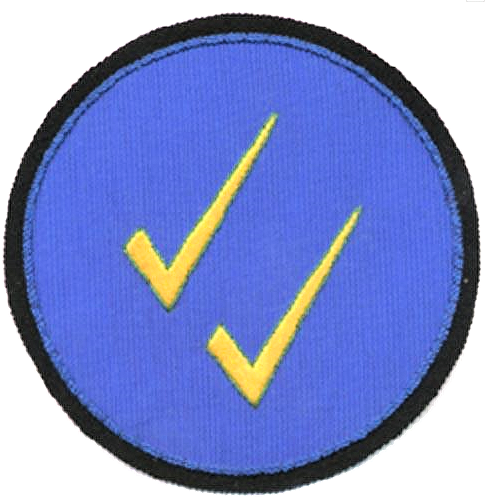
- Emblem of the 101st Bombardment (PR) Squadron

The 101st Bombardment (Photographic) Squadron is an inactive United States Air Force unit. It was last assigned to the XIX Tactical Air Command, based at Brooks Field, Texas, in 1944. It was inactivated on 25 December 1945.

== History ==
Initially established as an Army Air Service World War I Aero Squadron in 1917. Performed flying training in Texas and did not deploy overseas. Demobilized in 1918. Re-activated in 1935 at Kelly Field, Texas as a light observation Squadron and supported Army forces at Fort Sam Houston as part of the Air Corps Advanced Flying School.

=== World War II ===
Reactivated at France Field, Canal Zone, and subordinated to Headquarters, Panama Canal Department, on 1 February 1940 as the dedicated observation unit for the command. The Squadron acquired the first examples of the new North American O-47A when its complement of ten of these aircraft were flight-delivered down to Panama by Squadron personnel from San Antonio starting 14 June 1940. Also had a number of Northrop A-17s, and with these conducted its first six-aircraft night formation flight across the Isthmus to Albrook Field, then up the Pacific coast to Aguadulce Army Airfield. Then the flight continued on to the Atlantic coast and on home to France Field.

In August, 1940, the Squadron started participating in the then-weekly tactical problems laid on by the 19th Composite Wing and, during one of these, acted as a scouting screen out to sea to "intercept" an expected in-coming flight of "enemy" bombers heading for the Panama Canal. Later that same month, now transitioned into their O-47's completely, the Squadron made an aerial tour of Central America, visiting every capital city in Central America except British Honduras. Training continued through the end of the year, and, on 20 November, the Squadron was subordinated directly to Headquarters, Panama Canal Department Air Force, rather than Department Headquarters itself as it had previously been assigned.

The Squadron became attached to the 12th Pursuit Wing in February 1941. With the coming of war, the Squadron was still at France Field and on 25 February 1942 the unit was redesignated as the 39th Observation Squadron (Medium). By 3 March 1942, unit first-line strength had dropped to just six O-47A's, but two new Stinson O-49s had been added and, on the 7th, the unit was subordinated to the newly arrived 72d Observation Group, and moved to Howard Field on the 20th. Re-designated as the 39th Observation Squadron on 4 July 1942, the unit got ready for a major move to Waller Field in Trinidad, where it was attached after 6 August as a vital element of the Trinidad Sector & Base Command. By the end of the year, still nominally a part of the 72d Observation Group but detached in Trinidad. Following its arrival on Trinidad, the unit's aircraft were kept very busy Hying very low-level patrols around Trinidad and, occasionally, some of the other nearby islands in the Lesser Antilles, morning and night, with special instructions to keep a watch for possible German saboteur landing attempts.

On 25 June 1943, the character of the unit changed significantly when it was redesignated as the 39th Reconnaissance Squadron and was assigned five Bell P-39N Airacobras. The Squadron had been assigned to the Antilles Air Command from 1 June.

With the war now having essentially passed the Lesser Antilles by, the need for the Squadron quickly ebbed and, on 26 February 1944, the unit was relieved from the AAC and transferred back to the U.S. where it went on to become the 101st Photo Reconnaissance Squadron on 12 June 1944.

Returned to its prewar training mission at Brooks Field until inactivated at the end of the war.

=== Operations and decorations ===
- Combat Operations: Defense in Caribbean area, 1940–1944.
- Campaigns: None.
- Decorations: None.

=== Lineage ===
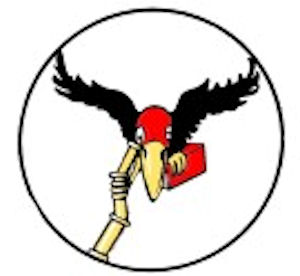
39th Observation Squadron emblem

- Organized as 39th Aero Squadron on 5 June 1917.

Redesignated Squadron A, Rich Field, Texas, on 14 July 1918.
Demobilized on 19 November 1918.

- Reconstituted and consolidated (1933) with 39th School Squadron which was constituted on 6 February 1923. Activated on 1 August 1927.

Redesignated 39th Observation Squadron on 1 March 1935.
Inactivated on 1 September 1936.

- Activated on 1 February 1940.

Redesignated: 39th Observation Squadron (Medium) on 26 February 1942.
Redesignated: 39th Observation Squadron on 4 July 1942.
Redesignated: 39th Reconnaissance Squadron on 25 June 1943.
Redesignated: 101st Photographic Reconnaissance Squadron on 12 June 1944.
Redesignated: 101st Bombardment (Photographic) Squadron on 7 February 1945.
Inactivated on 25 December 1945.
Disbanded on 8 October 1948.

=== Assignments ===
- Unknown, 1917–1918.
- 10th School Group, 1 August 1927.
- Air Corps Advanced Flying School, 16 July 1931 – 1 September 1936.
- Panama Canal Department, 1 February 1940.
- Panama Canal (later Caribbean, Sixth) Air Force, 20 November 1940.
- 72d Observation Group, 7 March 1942.

Attached to Trinidad Sector and Base Command after 6 August 1942.

- Antilles Air Command, 1 June 1943.
- Second Air Force, 15 March 1944.
- Third Air Force, 5 April 1944.
- 69th Tactical Reconnaissance Group, 11 April 1944.
- 74th Tactical Reconnaissance Group, 29 January 1945.
- XIX Tactical Air Command

Attached to 69th Reconnaissance Group, 7 November-25 December 1945.

=== Stations ===
- San Antonio, Texas, 5 June 1917.
- Chanute Field, Illinois, August 1917.
- Rich Field, Texas, December 1917-19 November 1918.
- Kelly Field, Texas, 1 August 1927 – 1 September 1936.
- France Field, Canal Zone, 1 February 1940.
- Howard Field, Canal Zone, 20 March 1942.
- Waller Field, Trinidad, 6 August 1942-c. 26 February 1944.
- Dalhart Army Airfield, Texas, 15 March 1944.
- Esler Field, Louisiana, 1 May 1944.
- Stuttgart Army Airfield, Arkansas, 6 February 1945.
- Brooks Field, Texas, 5–25 December 1945.

=== Aircraft ===
- Evidently SJ-1 and JN-4, 1917–1918
- In addition to 0-2 and 0–19, included 0–11, 0-25, 0-38, and C-14 during period 1932–1934; BT-2, 1934–1936. A-17, 1940
- In addition to L-4, 1942–1944, and B-18 and P-39, 1943–1944
- Included C-45, c. 1942–1943, B-25, C-60, and 0-52, 1943
- UC-61 and UC-78, 1943–1944
- In addition to B-25/F-10, 1944–1945
- Included A-25 and L-5, 1944
- A-26, 1945

== See also ==
- List of American Aero Squadrons
