= 72nd Air Base Wing =

Unit of the US Air Force, Air Force Materiel Command

72nd Air Base Wing

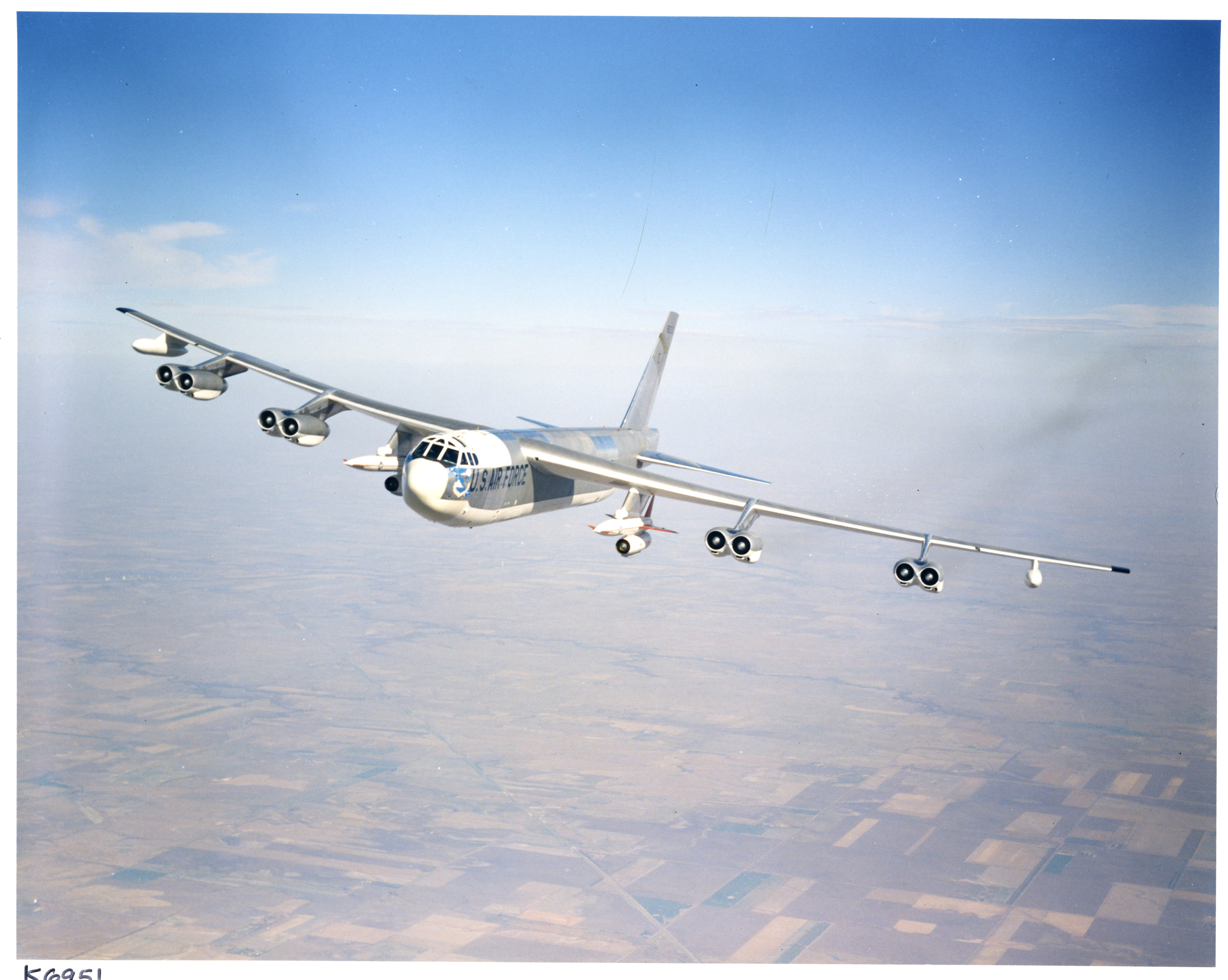
- B-52G Stratofortress with AGM-28 Hound Dog
- Active: 1941–1943; 1947–1949; 1952–1971; 1994–present
- Country: United States
- Branch: United States Air Force
- Role: Air Base Support
- Part of: Air Force Materiel Command
- Garrison/HQ: Tinker Air Force Base
- Decorations: Air Force Outstanding Unit Award

Commanders
- Current commander: Colonel Fencisco Harris
- Command Sergeant Major: Chief Master Sergeant Malcolm O. Summers II

Insignia
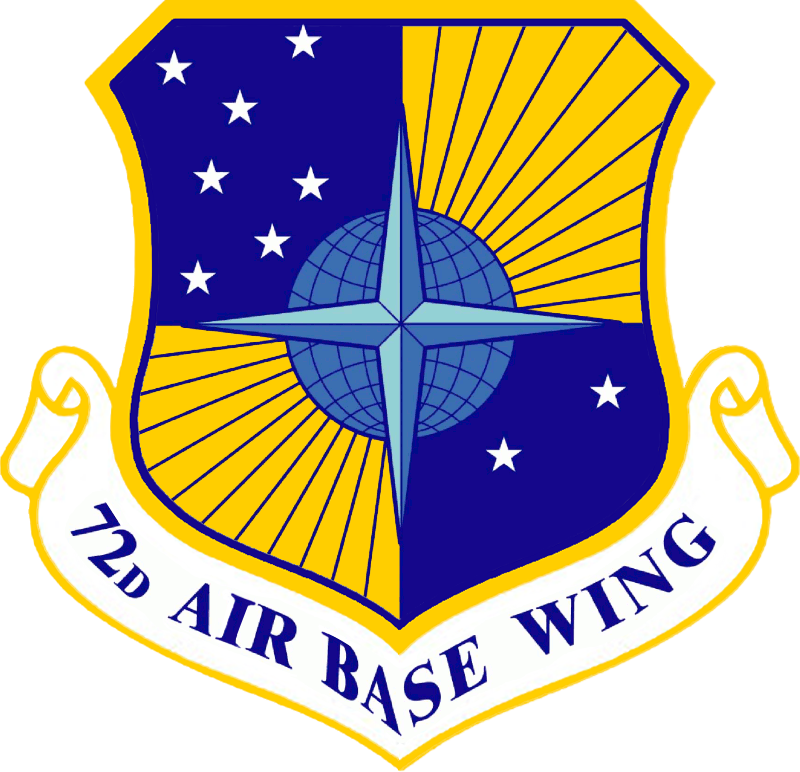
- 72nd Air Base Wing emblem (Note: Approved 13 October 1995.)

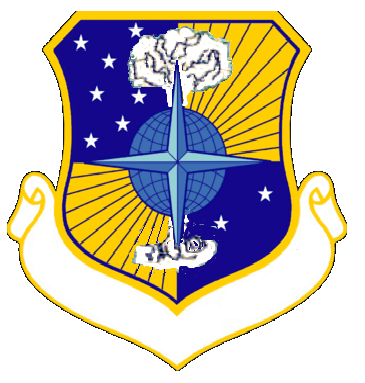
- 72nd Strategic Reconnaissance Wing emblem (Note: Approved 29 June 1954.)

The 72nd Air Base Wing is a wing of the United States Air Force. It is assigned to the Air Force Sustainment Center at Tinker Air Force Base, Oklahoma. It has been the host unit at Tinker since activating there on 1 October 1994.

The first predecessor of the wing was organized in 1941 as the 72nd Observation Group during the Louisiana Maneuvers. After the Attack on Pearl Harbor, the group moved to the Panama Canal Zone, where it performed aerial reconnaissance and antisubmarine missions until disbanding in 1943. The group was reconstituted and served in the reserve from 1947 until 1949, when it was inactivated as the Air Force budget was reduced.

The wing's second predecessor was organized in June 1952 as the 72nd Strategic Reconnaissance Wing, operating Convair RB-36 Peacemaker aircraft from Ramey Air Force Base, Puerto Rico. The wing converted to the Boeing B-52 Stratofortress in 1959 on acted in the strategic deterrent role with bombers and tankers until inactivating in June 1971.

== Mission ==
The 72nd Air Base Wing is the host organization for Tinker Air Force Base, Oklahoma. It provides base installation and support services for the Air Force Sustainment Center, the Oklahoma City Air Logistics Complex and more than 45 associate units, including two operational flying wings of Air Combat Command and Air Force Reserve Command, the United States Navy Strategic Communications Wing One and several Defense agencies. The wing provides support services for nearly 27,000 civilian and military personnel at Tinker. It also provides services to approximately 18,000 dependents and more than 36,000 military retirees and their family members in the surrounding area and supports almost 2,400 contractors.

The wing provides base functions including security, fire protection, medical services, civil engineering, communications and supply, transportation and airfield operations. It also offers a variety of recreational and leisure activities.

Organizations assigned to the Wing include the 72nd Medical Group, 72nd Mission Support Group, 72nd Operations Support Squadron and 72nd Logistics Readiness Squadron.

== History ==
=== World War II ===
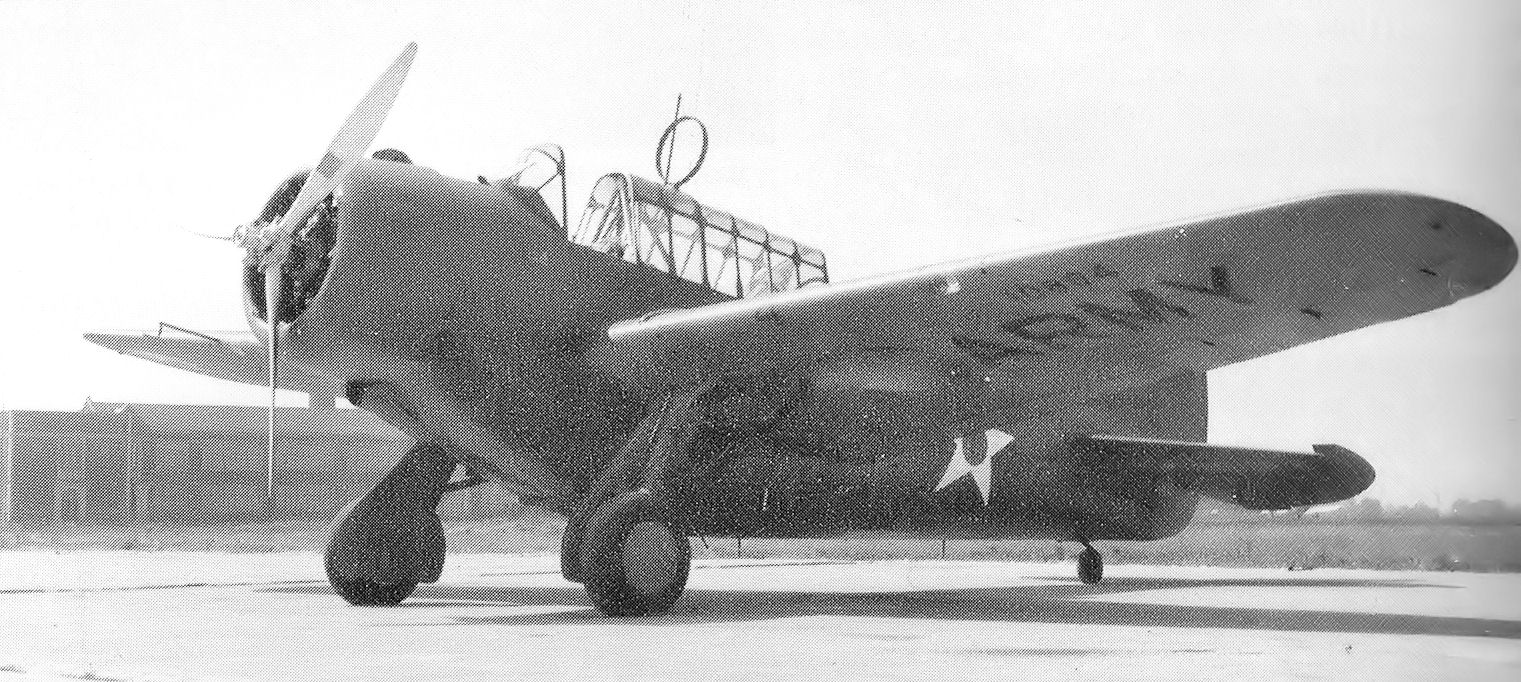
108th Squadron O-47 (Note: Aircraft is North American O-47B, serial 39-108. Probably taken at Midway Airport.)

The wing's first predecessor was organized during the Louisiana Maneuvers at Shreveport Municipal Airport, Louisiana as the 72nd Observation Group on 26 September 1941 as part of the United States Army's buildup prior to the country's entry into World War II. It drew its cadre from its three original squadrons. These were the 108th and 124th Observation Squadrons, two National Guard units that had been mobilized earlier that year, and the 1st Observation Squadron, a regular army unit. However, none of its assigned squadrons were located with group headquarters. The two National Guard squadrons remained at their prewar state stations, while the 1st Squadron was at Marshall Field, Kansas. A few days after activating, the group headquarters moved to Adams Field, Arkansas. The group's primary mission aircraft was the North American O-47, although it also flew the Stinson O-49 Vigilant.

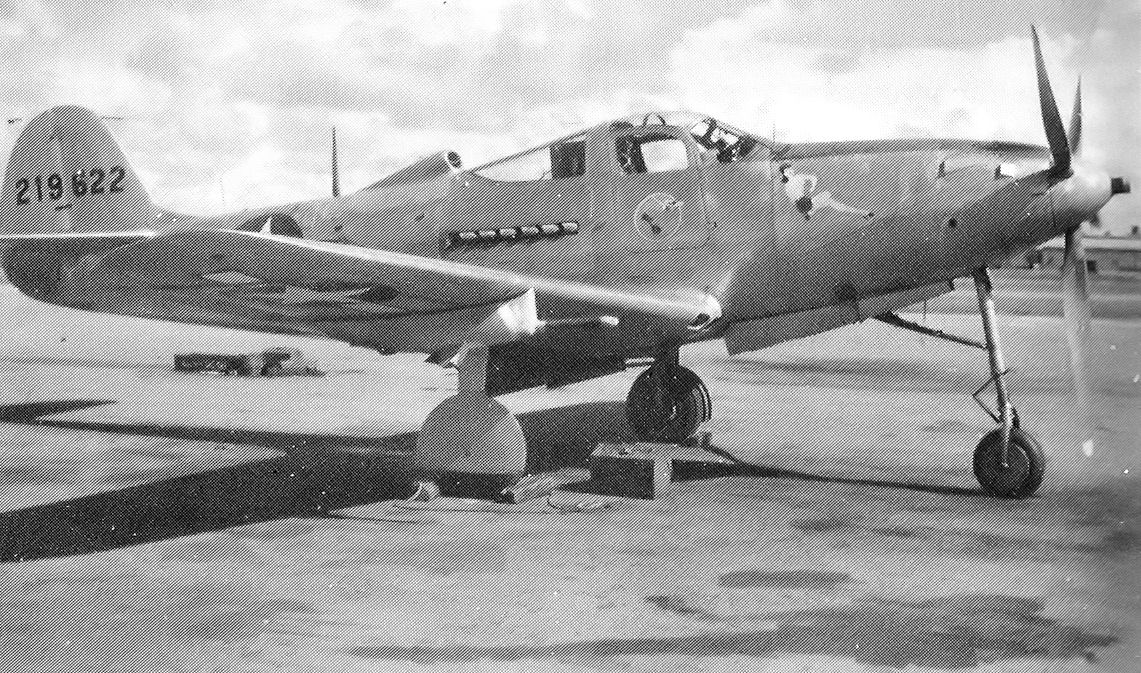
4th Reconnaissance Squadron P-39Q (Note: Aircraft is Bell P-39Q-5-BE Airacobra, serial 42-19622, taken in 1943 at Borinquen Field, Puerto Rico.)

While the group was still organizing, Japan attacked Pearl Harbor. The group joined the 1st Squadron at Marshall Field, and at the end of the month, both departed for Howard Field in the Canal Zone, arriving there along with the 108th Squadron on 18 January 1942. Although the 124th Squadron remained assigned to the group, it remained in the United States until being reassigned in March 1942. Its place was taken by the 4th and 39th Observation Squadrons, which were assigned to the group the same month. However the group acted only as an administrative headquarters for these units, as the 4th was located at Losey Field, Puerto Rico and operated under the Puerto Rican Department for nearly the entire time it was assigned. The 39th was initially stationed in Panama, but moved to Waller Field, Trinidad in August 1942 and was controlled by the Trinidad Sector and Base Command after its move. The group added Piper L-4 Grasshoppers, Douglas B-18 Bolos and Bell P-39 Airacobras to its inventory in the Caribbean.

The group performed antisubmarine patrols and search and rescue missions. It performed aerial reconnaissance for ground units and flew some photographic charting missions. It also provided forces in the Caribbean with mail service. On 1 June 1943, the two squadrons located in the eastern Caribbean were reassigned to the Antilles Air Command. Later that month, the group and its remaining squadrons were renamed from observation to reconnaissance units. The group disbanded in November 1943 as the 108th Squadron inactivated and the 1st Squadron was reassigned directly to Sixth Air Force.

=== Air Force reserve ===
The group was reactivated as a reserve unit under Air Defense Command (ADC) at Hamilton Field, California in July 1947, where its training was supervised by the 415 AAF Base Unit (later the 2346th Air Force Reserve Training Center). Upon activation, it was assigned the newly constituted 60th Reconnaissance Squadron. The following month, it added the 73d Fighter Squadron. In 1948 Continental Air Command (ConAC) assumed responsibility for managing reserve and Air National Guard units from ADC. However, it does not appear that the group was fully manned or equipped with operational aircraft during this period.

The 72nd was inactivated in June 1949 when ConAC reorganized its reserve units under the wing base organization system. President Truman's reduced 1949 defense budget also required reductions in the number of groups in the Air Force to 48. The group's personnel and equipment were transferred to elements of the 349th Troop Carrier Wing, which was simultaneously activated to replace reserve elements at Hamilton.

=== Strategic Air Command ===
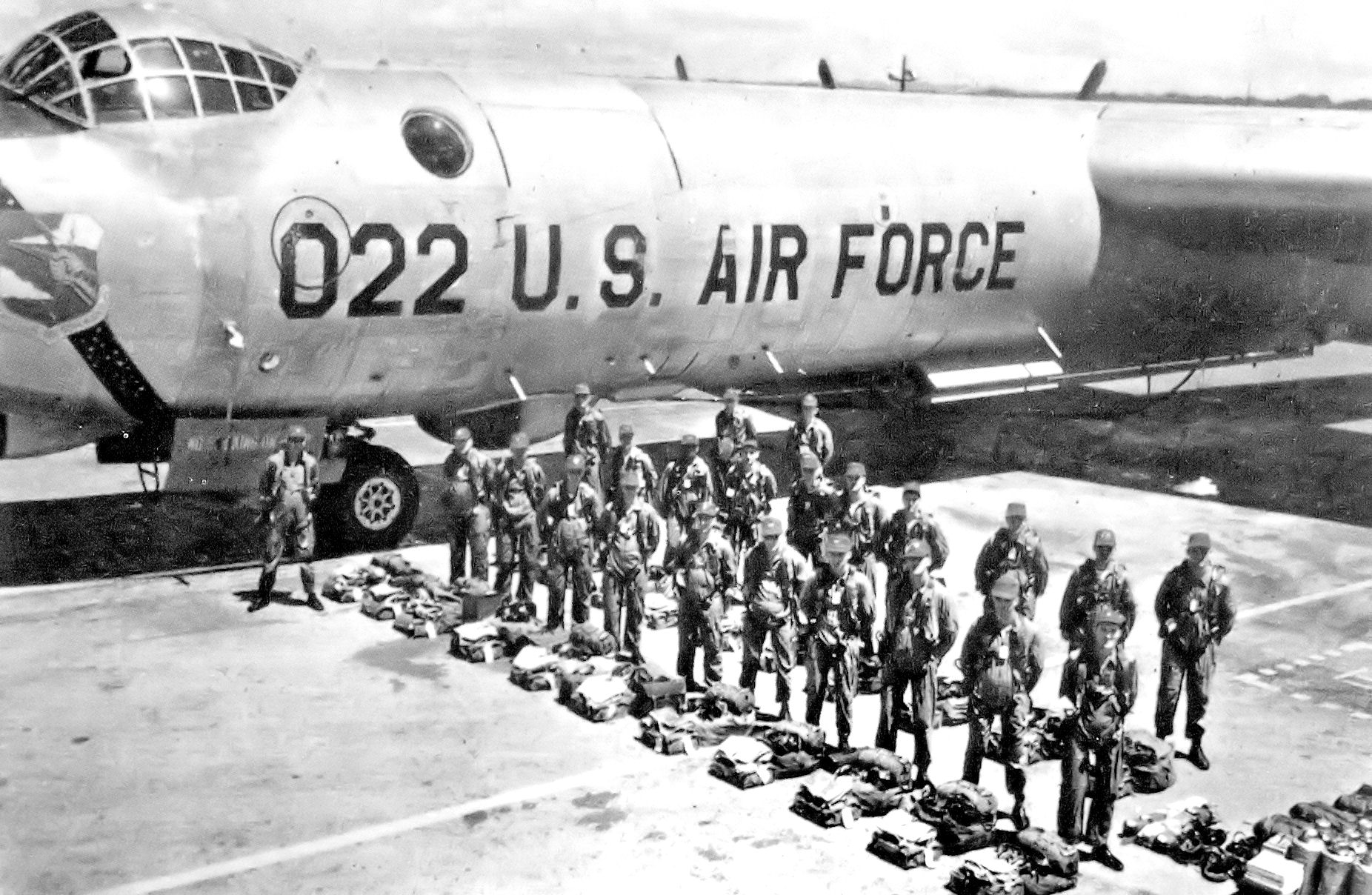
Crew of a Wing RB-36 Peacemaker at Ramey AFB, about 1954

The second predecessor of the wing was the 72nd Strategic Reconnaissance Wing, which was activated in June 1952 at Ramey Air Force Base, Puerto Rico as a long range reconnaissance unit. It was assigned the 60th and 73rd Strategic Reconnaissance Squadrons, which had been elements of the 72nd Group while a reserve unit, and the new 301st Strategic Reconnaissance Squadron as its operational units. The combat squadrons reported directly to the wing, eliminating the intermediate group structures under the "dual deputy" organization. However, until the end of September, the wing existed only on paper, and was commanded by the commander of the 55th Strategic Reconnaissance Wing as an additional duty. In October 1952, the 55th Wing moved to Forbes Air Force Base, Kansas without personnel or equipment, and the 72nd absorbed its remaining resources at Ramey.

Although the 55th Wing had primarily operated Boeing RB-50 Superfortresses at Ramey, the 72nd Wing began to equip with the Convair RB-36 Peacemaker. The wing conducted global strategic reconnaissance from 1953. On 16 June 1954 the wing, along with SAC's other B-36 reconnaissance wings, was assigned bombing as its primary mission. However, it retained its designation as a reconnaissance wing until 1955.

In 1958, the wing prepared for transition to the Boeing B-52 Stratofortress. Its Peacemakers were gone by the end of the year, with the 73rd Squadron becoming nonoperational on 1 September 1958, followed by the 301st Squadron on 11 September and the 60th Squadron on 18 November. The 915th Air Refueling Squadron, operating Boeing KC-135 Stratotankers activated on 1 September 1958. The first B-52s arrived the following year. However, starting in 1957 Strategic Air Command (SAC) had developed plans to disperse its B-52 force to reduce its vulnerability to Soviet missile attack. SAC bases with large concentrations of bombers made attractive targets. SAC's response was to break up its wings and scatter their aircraft over a larger number of bases. Under this program, the wing's 73d Bombardment Squadron moved to Seymour Johnson Air Force Base, North Carolina on 5 January as the strike unit for the 4241st Strategic Wing, while the 301st Bombardment Squadron moved to Eglin Air Force Base, Florida on 17 June 1959 to perform a similar role with the 4135th Strategic Wing, leaving the 60th as the wing's only bomber unit. The two transferred squadrons remained nonoperational until they were reassigned, while the 60th became operational with the B-52 on 13 August 1959.

Starting in 1960, one third of the wing's aircraft were maintained on fifteen minute alert, fully fueled, armed and ready for combat to reduce vulnerability to a Soviet missile strike. This was increased to half the wing's aircraft in 1962.

Soon after detection of Soviet missiles in Cuba, on 20 October, the wing was directed to put two additional planes on alert. On 22 October 1/8 of SAC B-52s had been placed on airborne alert. Additional KC-135s were placed on alert to replace KC-135s devoted to maintaining the B-52 bomber force on airborne alert. On 24 October SAC went to DEFCON 2, placing all the wing's aircraft on alert. On 21 November SAC returned to normal airborne alert posture. The same day, SAC went to DEFCON 3 and on 27 November SAC returned to the wing normal alert posture. The wing continued to stand nuclear alert until shortly before inactivating in June 1971. The 915th Air Refueling Squadron inactivated with the wing and its personnel and planes were assigned to other units. While the 60th Bombardment Squadron's resources were also dispersed, the squadron moved on paper to Anderson Air Force Base, Guam, where it would resume operating B-52s.

=== Air Force Commanders' Conferences ===
In addition to its combat mission the wing hosted the annual United States Air Force Commander's Conferences, code named Corona South. While these began on an irregular basis in 1955, by the 1960s, they had been a regular annual event at Ramey. They continued until the wing was inactivated. Military Airlift Command continued them until Ramey closed and they were transferred to Homestead Air Force Base, Florida.

=== Air base support ===
In January 1984, the 72nd Reconnaissance Group and the 72nd Bombardment Wing were consolidated into a single unit. The consolidated unit was redesignated the 72nd Air Base Wing and activated at Tinker Air Force Base, Oklahoma on 1 October 1994. The wing replaced the 654th Air Base Group, which had served as the host for Tinker since 1953 under various designations. (Note: The group had been organized on 1 August 1953 as the 2854th Air Base Wing. It was downgraded to group status on 16 October 1964. When the Air Force eliminated Major Command Controlled units (4 digit), it became the 654th Support Group on 1 October 1992, then the 654th Air Base Group a year later. See Mueller, p. 545 (designations through September 1982).)

== Lineage ==
72nd Reconnaissance Group

- Constituted as the 72nd Observation Group on 21 August 1941

Activated on 26 September 1941
Redesignated 72nd Reconnaissance Group (Special) on 25 June 1943
Disbanded on 1 November 1943

- Reconstituted as the 72nd Reconnaissance Group on 13 May 1947

Activated in the reserve on 12 June 1947
Inactivated on 27 June 1949

- Consolidated with the 72nd Bombardment Wing as the 72nd Bombardment Wing on 31 January 1984

72nd Air Base Wing

- Constituted as the 72nd Strategic Reconnaissance Wing, Heavy on 4 June 1952 (Note: In 1972, SAC activated the Strategic Wing, Provisional, 72nd at Andersen Air Force Base, Guam. Despite the similarity in name and number, this provisional wing is unrelated to the 72nd Strategic Reconnaissance Wing.)

Activated on 16 June 1952
Redesignated 72nd Bombardment Wing, Heavy on 1 October 1955
Inactivated on 30 June 1971

- Consolidated with the 72nd Reconnaissance Group on 31 January 1984
- Redesignated 72nd Air Base Wing on 16 September 1994

Activated on 1 October 1994

=== Assignments ===
- 2nd Air Support Command, 26 September 1941 (Note: Stevens Lists this as "2 Air Service Command." This seems unlikely as Maurer lists all three of the group's original squadrons as being previously assigned to "II Air Support Command" and observation, light bomber and dive bomber units were typically assigned to air support commands at this time. Maurer elsewhere omits the components of II Air Support Command because of their "large number and frequent changes." Maurer, Combat Units, p. 434. Roman numbers did not come into use for commands until September 1942. "Air Force Historical Research Agency Organizational Reconds: Types of USAF Organizations". Air Force History Index. 9 January 2008..)
- Service Command, Caribbean Air Force (later, 6th Air Force Base Command; VI Air Force Base Command; VI Air Force Service Command), January 1942
- VI Ground Air Support Command (Provisional), 15 October 1942 (Note: Stevens lists this as "VI Ground Support Command.")
- VI Air Force Service Command, 21 August – 1 November 1943
- 325th Reconnaissance Wing (later, 325th Air Division, Reconnaissance), 12 July 1947 – 27 June 1949
- Second Air Force, 16 June 1952
- Eighth Air Force, 1 January 1959
- 823rd Air Division, 1 October 1962 – 30 June 1971
- Oklahoma City Air Logistics Center, 1 October 1994 (attached to Air Force Sustainment Center after 10 July 2012)

=== Components ===
Groups

- 72nd Air Base Group (later 72nd Combat Support Group, 72nd Support Group, 72nd Mission Support Group): 16 June 1952 – 30 June 1971, 1 October 1994 – present
- 72nd Medical Group (later 72nd Tactical Hospital, 72nd Medical Group): 16 June 1952 – 1 April 1959, 1 October 1994 – present
- 826th Medical Group (later USAF Hospital, Ramey) 1 April 1959 – c. 8 August 1972

Operational Squadrons

- 1st Observation Squadron (later 1st Reconnaissance Squadron): 26 September 1941 – 1 November 1943 (attached to 6th Bombardment Group, 10 April-c. 20 June 1942)
- 4th Observation Squadron: 29 March 1942 – 1 June 1943 (attached to Puerto Rican Department, 29 March 1942; Antilles Air Task Force after 23 March 1943)
- 39th Observation Squadron: 7 March 1942 – 1 June 1943 (attached to Trinidad Sector and Base Command after 6 August 1942)
- 60th Reconnaissance Squadron (later 60th Strategic Reconnaissance Squadron, 60th Bombardment Squadron): 12 July 1947 – 27 June 1949, 16 June 1952 – 30 June 1971 (not operational until 4 October 1952 and from 18 November 1958 – 13 August 1959)
- 73d Fighter Squadron (later 73rd Strategic Reconnaissance Squadron 73rd Bombardment Squadron): 1 August 1947 – 27 June 1949, 16 June 1952 – 5 January 1959 (not operational until 7 January 1953 and after 1 September 1958)
- 108th Observation Squadron (later 108th Reconnaissance Squadron): 26 September 1941 – 1 November 1943
- 124th Observation Squadron: 26 September 1941 – 12 March 1942
- 301st Strategic Reconnaissance Squadron (later 301 Bombardment Squadron): 16 June 1952 – 17 June 1959(not operational until c. 15 March 1953 and after 17 September 1958)
- 915th Air Refueling Squadron: 1 September 1958 – 30 June 1971

Support Squadrons

- 1st Communications Squadron, Air Support (later 1st Air Support Communications Squadron: Attached April 1942 – April 1943
- 21st Munitions Maintenance Squadron: 1 July 1960 – 30 June 1971
- 72nd Airborne Missile Maintenance Squadron: 1 November 1962 – 30 June 1971
- 72nd Armament and Electronics Maintenance Squadron (later 72nd Avionics Maintenance Squadron): 16 June 1952 – 30 June 1971
- 72nd Comptroller Squadron: 2 July 2004 – unknown
- 72nd Field Maintenance Squadron: 16 June 1952 – 30 June 1971
- 72nd Logistics Readiness Squadron: after 13 March 2009 – present
- 72nd Operations Support Squadron: 1 October 1994 – present
- 72nd Periodic Maintenance Squadron (later 72nd Organizational Maintenance Squadron): 16 June 1952 – 30 June 1971

Other

- USAF Hospital, Ramey: (see 826th Medical Group)
- 4235th USAF Hospital: 15 February 1954 – 1 February 1959

=== Stations ===
- Shreveport Municipal Airport, Louisiana, 26 September 1941
- Adams Field, Arkansas, 2 October 1941
- Marshall Field, Kansas, 11–27 December 1941
- Howard Field, Panama Canal Zone, 18 January 1942 – 1 November 1943
- Hamilton Field (later Hamilton Air Force Base), California, 12 July 1947 – 27 June 1949
- Ramey Air Force Base, Puerto Rico, 16 June 1952 – 30 June 1971
- Tinker Air Force Base, Oklahoma, 1 October 1994 – present

=== Aircraft ===
- North American O-47, 1941–1943
- Stinson O-49 Vigilant, 1941–1943
- Piper L-4 Grasshopper, 1942–1943
- Douglas B-18 Bolo, 1942–1943
- Bell P-39 Airacobra, 1943
- Convair RB-36 Peacemaker, 1952–1958
- Boeing KC-135 Stratotanker, 1958–1971
- Boeing B-52 Stratofortress, 1959–1971

=== Awards and campaigns ===
Award streamer	Award	Dates	Notes
	Air Force Outstanding Unit Award	1 October 1957–1 June 1958	72nd Bombardment Wing
	Air Force Outstanding Unit Award	1 July 1968– 30 June 1969	72nd Bombardment Wing
	Air Force Outstanding Unit Award	1 January 1995-31 December 1996	72nd Air Base Wing
	Air Force Outstanding Unit Award	1 January 1997-31 December 1998	72nd Air Base Wing
	Air Force Outstanding Unit Award	1 January 2005-31 December 2006	72nd Air Base Wing
	Air Force Outstanding Unit Award	1 July 2012-30 June 2014	72nd Air Base Wing

Campaign Streamer	Campaign	Dates	Notes
	Antisubmarine	7 December 1941 – 1 November 1943	72nd Observation Group (later 72nd Reconnaissance Group)

== See also ==
- List of B-52 Units of the United States Air Force
- List of USAF Bomb Wings and Wings assigned to Strategic Air Command
- List of USAF Reconnaissance wings assigned to Strategic Air Command
