= Punta Borinquen Radar Station =

Facility of the Puerto Rico Air National Guard

Coordinates: 18°29′6.21″N 67°8′55.50″W

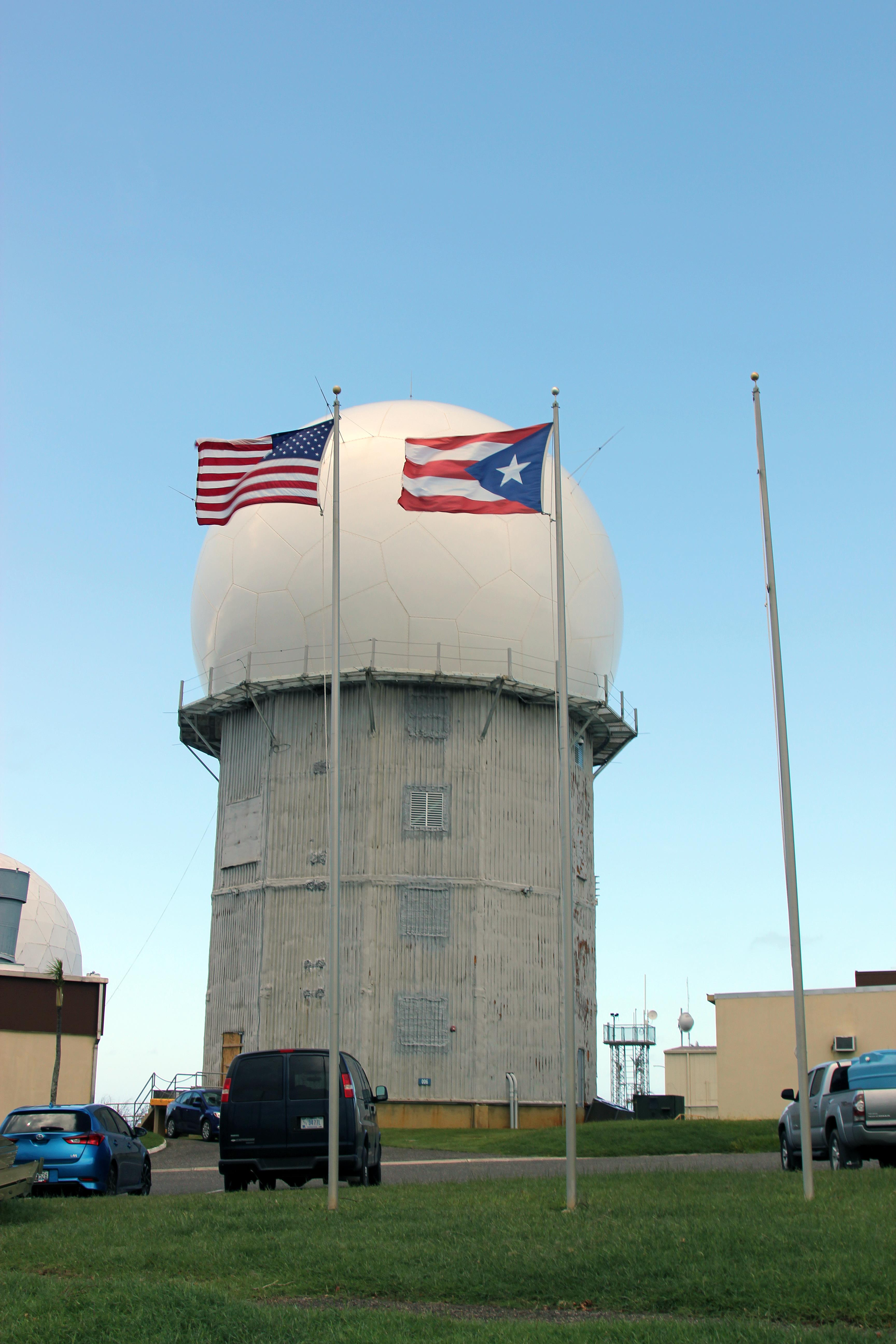
FAA radar tower at Punta Borinquen Radar Station in Aguadilla, Puerto Rico

Punta Borinquen Radar Station is a facility of the Puerto Rico Air National Guard home for the 141st Air Control Squadron. Located adjacent to Rafael Hernández Airport (which operates at the old Ramey Air Force Base), in Aguadilla, Puerto Rico. The facility has operated since 1964 when the 140th Aircraft Control and Warning Squadron (ACWS) was created under the control of Air Defense Command (ADC).

== See also ==
- Air National Guard
- Puerto Rico National Guard
- Military of Puerto Rico
