= Edwin Bowman Lyon =

US Air Force general (1892–1971)

Edwin B. Lyon
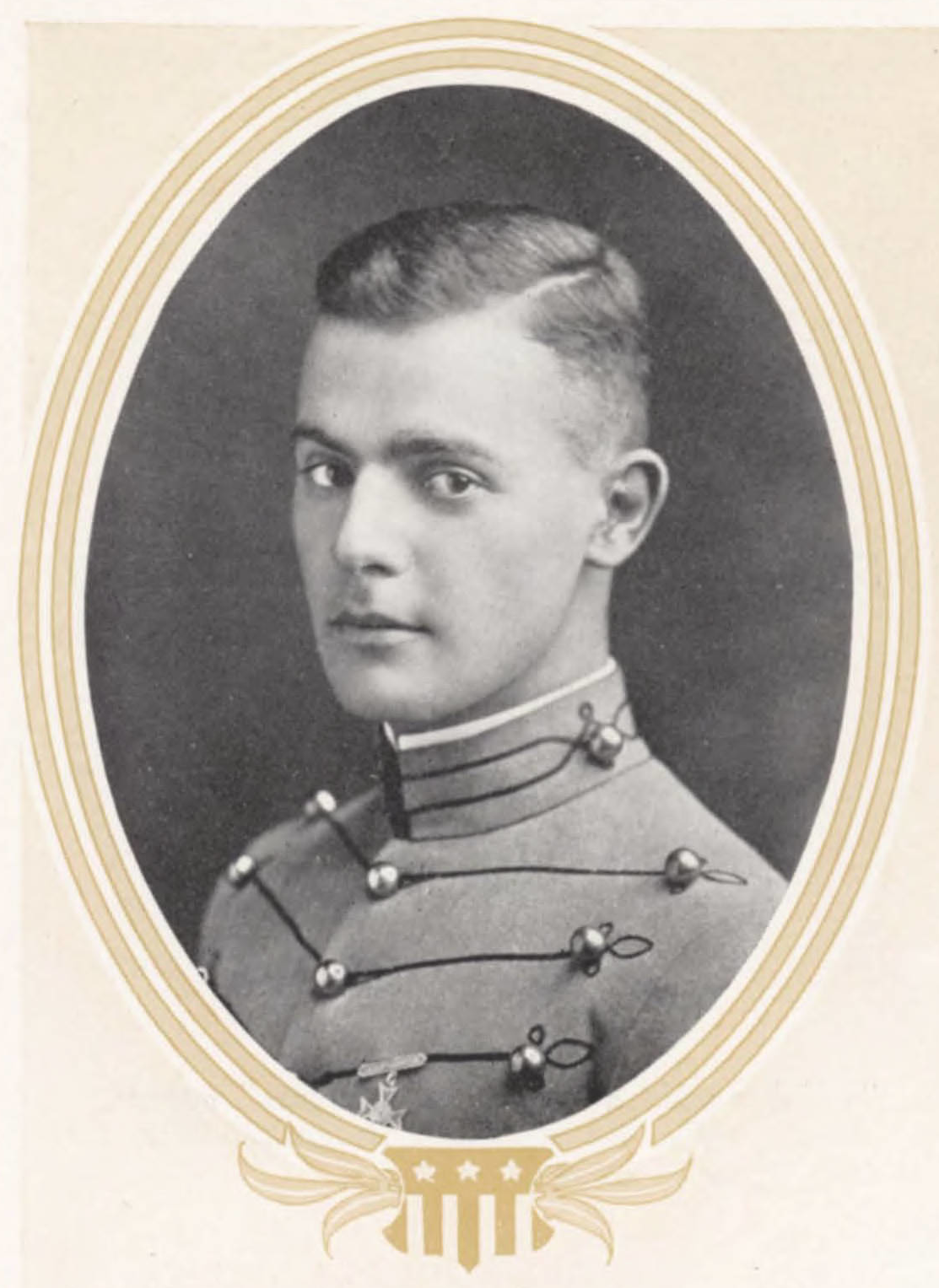
- At West Point in 1915
- Born: December 8, 1892; Las Cruces, New Mexico, United States
- Died: August 12, 1971 (aged 78); Washington, D.C., United States
- Burial place: Arlington National Cemetery
- Military career
- Allegiance: United States
- Branch: United States Army; United States Air Force
- Service years: 1915–1952
- Rank: Major general
- Conflicts: Pancho Villa Expedition; World War II
- Awards: Air Medal; Legion of Merit

Edwin Bowman Lyon (1892–1971) was an American major general. In 1916, he joined the Pancho Villa Expedition. He was also active in World War II. In 1943, he became the commander of the Antilles Air Force and a year later he was a commander of 75th Flying Training Wing at Fort Myers, Florida. After the war, in 1945, he commanded an Army Garrison Forces at Oahu, Hawaii and later became deputy commander at the Army Air Forces in the Pacific Ocean.

== Early life ==
Edwin Lyon was born in 1892 at Las Cruces, New Mexico. In 1915 he graduated from the United States Military Academy and was appointed as a second lieutenant of Cavalry on June 12 of the same year. The same year he served at 7th Cavalry at Douglas, Arizona. He joined the Pancho Villa Expedition into Mexico in March 1916 and in December of the same year, was recruited to the Aviation Section of the Signal Corps at San Diego, California where he worked as a recorder. In September 1918 he graduated from the Bombardment School at Ellington Field, Texas, and then went to Aracadia, Florida to study gunnery. In November of the same year he was given a job at Garden City, Florida, to train a heavy aircraft group, after which he relocated himself to Mitchel Field, New York. Next year, as a general, he went to California where he was stationed at the Presidio of San Francisco.

== Career ==
On July 1, 1920, he was relocated again, this time to the Air Service, and a month later became an instructor at the U.S. Military Academy. In August 1921 he was chosen to be an air officer at the First Corps Area at Boston, Massachusetts. Two years later, at Langley Field, Virginia, he was welcomed at the Air Service Tactical School. From that school he graduated three years later and became an instructor there for two years. In June 1927 he graduated from Command and General Staff School at Fort Leavenworth, Kansas, and then worked as Chief of Air Corps.

In July 1929, he was commanding the 25th Bombardment Squadron at the Panama Canal. Two years later Lyon got enrolled into the Army War College, and next year graduated from it with honours. He then worked as the War Department General Staff till he became an assistant commandant in August 1936 at the Air Corps Primary Flying School at Randolph Field, Texas. In 1940 he attended Basic Flying School at Moffett Field, California and next year received a title of commanding officer of the West Coast Air Corps Training Center. In 1943 he became a commander of the Antilles Air Task Force and a year later he was a commander of 75th Flying Training Wing at Fort Myers, Florida. In May of the same year he was a commanding general at the Army Air Forces Training Command at Laredo, Texas.

== Post War era ==
In 1945 he was given a task to command an Army Garrison Forces at Oahu, Hawaii and in July of the same year became deputy commander at the Army Air Forces in the Pacific Ocean. He was then a commander of the Sixth Air Service Area Command and a month later became a commander of the Army Air Forces in the Mid Pacific. Exactly year later, he came back to the headquarters of the Army Air Forces and then got a job as Air Materiel Command at Wright Field, Ohio. In July of the same year he came back to the headquarters of the Army Air Forces as chief of the Army Air Forces Officers Selection Branch. He retired in December 1952 with the Legion of Merit and the Air Medal. He died in Washington, D.C., on August 12, 1971, and was buried at Arlington National Cemetery.
