= 141st Air Control Squadron =

United States Air Force unit

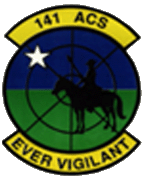
- 141st Air Control Squadron emblem
- Active: 1948–1953; 1982–present
- Country: United States
- Allegiance: Puerto Rico
- Branch: Air National Guard
- Garrison/HQ: Punta Borinquen Radar Station, Aguadilla, Puerto Rico

Commanders
- Current commander: Lt. Col. Jose Aldrich

The 141st Air Control Squadron is a unit of the Puerto Rico Air National Guard. It is a mobile radar command, control and communications element of the United States Air Force Theater Air Control System located at Punta Borinquen Radar Station near by Rafael Hernandez Airport formerly Ramey Air Force Base in Aguadilla, Puerto Rico.

The unit can be tasked by the Control and Reporting Center (CRC) to perform the following tasks: Battle management, weapons, surveillance, identification, and data link management. It also, can be assigned to deploy and operate directly subordinate to Air Operation Center.

These activities include: Establishing long and short haul communication, providing continuous surveillance, assisting in air rescue operations, providing aircraft control and advisory services, establishing and maintaining data links, gathering and forwarding intelligence products, providing classification of airborne objects, and providing threat warnings to forward, lateral, and subordinate users including Army air defense units. In addition, the 141st ACS has been directly tasked to support the DoD Counterdrug Operations in the Caribbean, Central, and South America Region.

The 141st Air Control Squadron transitioned to an Air Mobility Squadron effective on April 1, 2025, and will became the first AMS in the Air National Guard enterprise.

== See also ==
- Puerto Rico National Guard
- Puerto Rico Air National Guard
- United States Air Force
- Rafael Hernandez Airport
- Ramey Air Force Base
- Military history of Puerto Rico
