= Rich Field =

- Waco, Texas
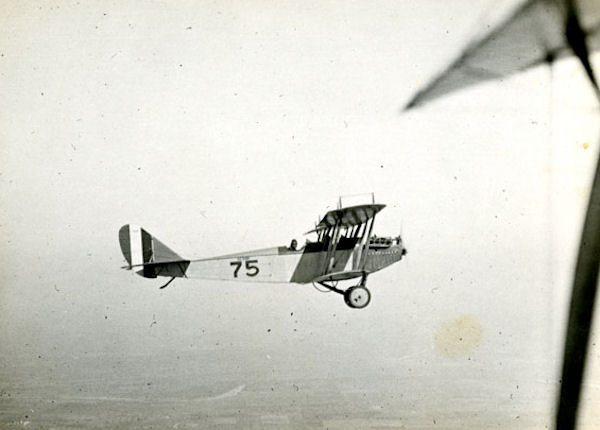
- Curtiss JN-4 flying from Rich Field, Waco, Texas, 1918

Site information
- Type: Pilot training airfield
- Controlled by: Air Service, United States Army
- Condition: Redeveloped into urban area

Location
- Coordinates: 31°32′45″N 97°11′16″W

Site history
- Built: 1917
- In use: 1917–1945
- Battles/wars: World War I World War II

Garrison information
- Garrison: Training Section, Air Service

Rich Field is a former World War I military airfield, located in Waco, Texas, near what is now the intersection of Bosque Boulevard and 41st Street. It operated as a training field for the Air Service, United States Army from 1917 until 1919. The airfield was one of thirty-two Air Service training camps established in 1917 after the United States entry into World War I.

== History ==
The base was named Rich Field in honor of 2nd Lt. C. Perry Rich of the Philippine Scouts. He was born in Indiana, and had been instructed to fly by Lt. Frank P. Lahm in May 1913, and then crashed his Wright Model C into Manila Bay on November 14, the tenth U.S. pilot to die in a flying accident. Rich's body was recovered and was buried at Arlington National Cemetery, near other early aviators.

=== World War I ===
A contract was signed on August 24, 1917 giving the War Department title to the property, which was in private hands. The land was formerly cotton fields, so a significant number of farm buildings on the property had to be torn down. A labor force of about 3,400, including 1,000 Mexican workers, erected buildings, poured concrete, and laid down pipes and an electrical system.

On September 17, 1917, the first officer reported for duty, and various pieces of equipment and a group of personnel were assigned to set up the base as a primary flight training field. The first shipment of 25 aircraft arrived on November 14 and were uncrated and assembled by the 150th Aero Squadron, moved from Kelly Field. Twenty-five flight cadets reported for training on Thanksgiving Day 1917, and flight instruction began on December 1. Eventually a total of 243 Standard J-1 trainers were assigned to Rich Field. In June 1918, the J-1s were replaced by the Curtiss JN-4 which was standardized by the War Department as the standard training plane for the Air Service.

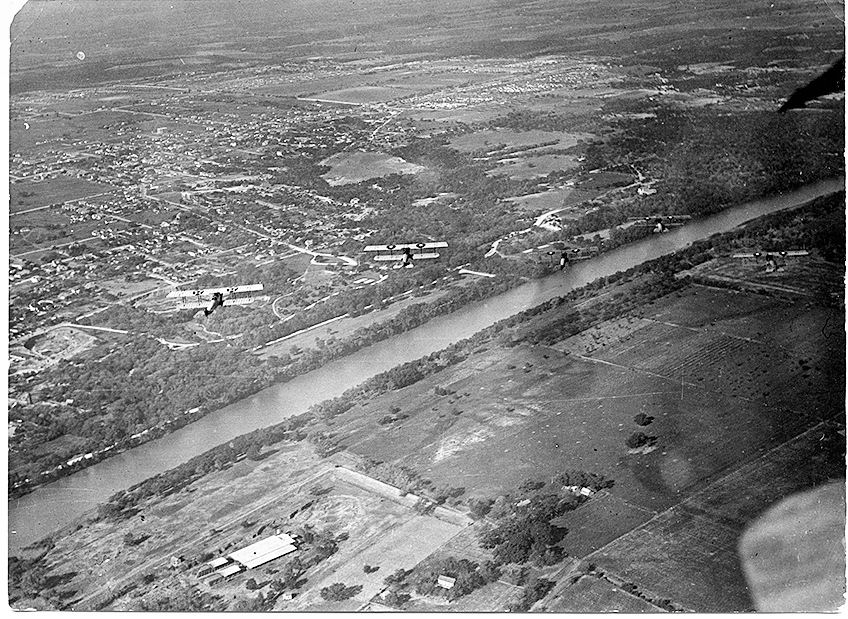
U.S. Army Air Corps Flyers from Rich Field over the Brazos River in Waco, 1918. It shows a formation of aircraft over the Brazos River and is one of the first aerial photos of Waco.

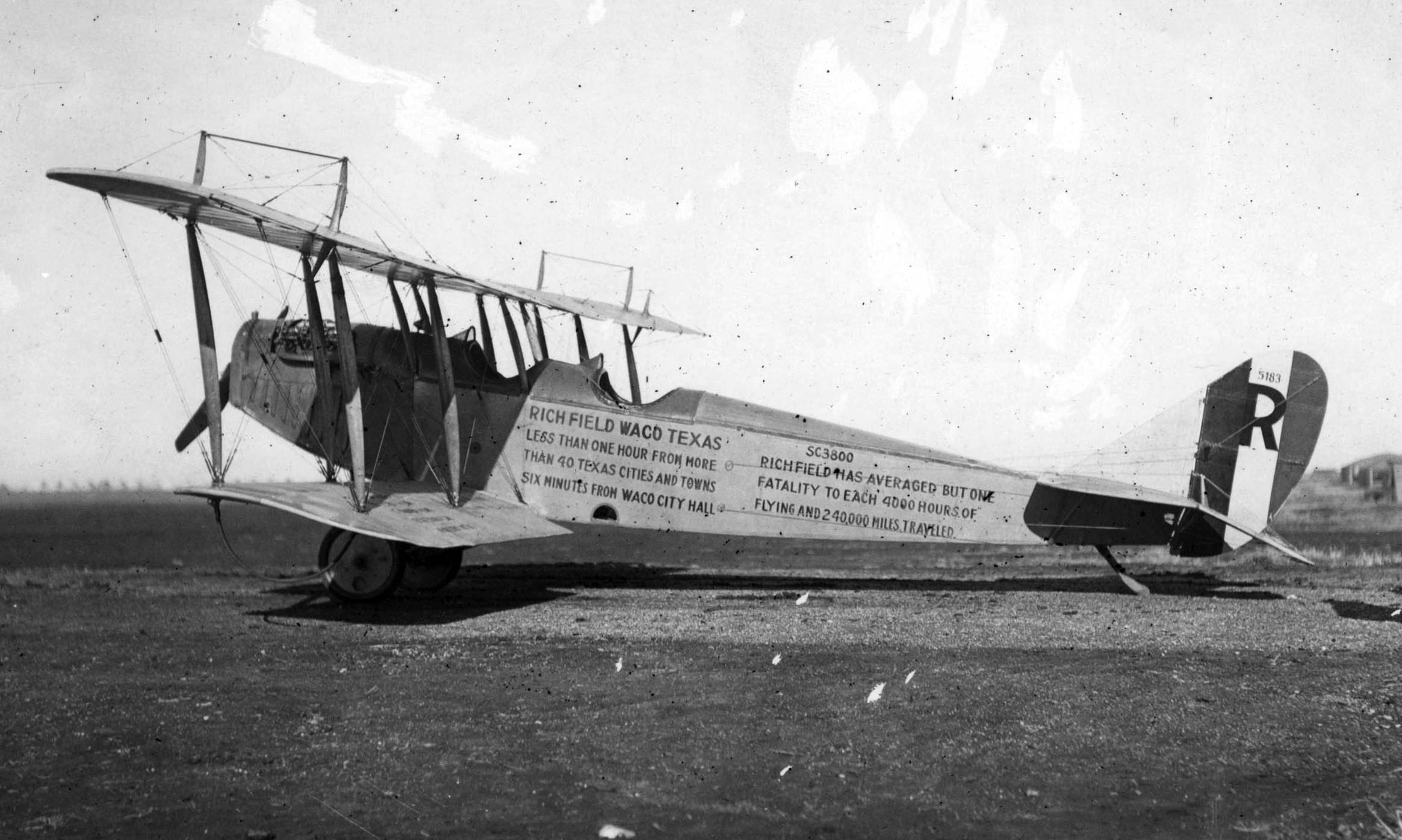
A Curtiss JN-4 at Rich Field painted to brag of the low fatality rate at the field - one per 4,000 hours.

Training units assigned to Rich Field were as follows:

- Post Headquarters, Rich Field, September 1917-December 1919
- 39th Aero Squadron, December 1917

Re-designated "Squadron A", July–November 1918

- 150th Aero Squadron, November 1917

Re-designated "Squadron B", July–November 1918

- 249th Aero Squadron (Service), December 1917

Re-designated "Squadron C", July–November 1918

- Flying School Detachment, Formed November 1918 from personnel and assets of Squadrons A, B. C. inactivated in December 1919

As the flight cadets graduated from the six-week course at Rich Field, they were sent to advance schools in the United States, England, or France for advanced training in either pursuit, observation or bomber aircraft. Eventually some 400 pilots received their wings at Rich Field.

Training units organized and equipped at Rich Field as core training squadrons for other Air Service training bases in the United States were:

- 71st Aero Squadron (II), Formed February 1918, transferred to Love Field, Texas
- 75th Aero Squadron (II), Formed February 1918, transferred to Gerstner Field, Louisiana
- 76th Aero Squadron (II), Formed February 1918, transferred to Carlstrom Field, Florida, March 1918
- 77th Aero Squadron (II), Formed February 1918, transferred to Taliaferro Field #1 (Hicks Field), Texas
- 78th Aero Squadron (II), Formed February 1918, transferred to Taliaferro Field #1, Texas
- 79th Aero Squadron (II), Formed February 1918, transferred to Taliaferro Field #1, Texas
- 80th Aero Squadron (II), Formed March 1918, transferred to Post Field, Oklahoma
- 81st Aero Squadron (II), Formed March 1918, transferred to Post Field, Oklahoma
- 82d Aero Squadron (II), Formed March 1918, transferred to Taliaferro Field #1, Texas
- 106th Aero Squadron (II), Formed March 1918, transferred to Taliaferro Field #2 (Barron Field), Texas
- 107th Aero Squadron (II), Formed March 1918, transferred to Carlstrom Field, Florida
- 108th Aero Squadron (II), Formed March 1918, transferred to Carlstrom Field, Florida
- 109th Aero Squadron (II), Formed March 1918, transferred to Carlstrom Field, Florida, April 1918
- 110th Aero Squadron (II), Formed April 1918, transferred to Dorr Field, Florida, May 1918
- 111th Aero Squadron (II), Formed April 1918, transferred to Dorr Field, Florida, May 1918
- 112th Aero Squadron (II), Formed April 1918, transferred to Chanute Field, Illinois, May 1918

The following units were organized and given basic military indoctrination at Rich Field before being deployed to the American Expeditionary Forces in Europe:

- 72d Aero Squadron (Service), Formed February 1918, to AEF, July 1918
- 171st Aero Squadron (Service), Formed December 1917, to AEF, January 1918
- 280th Aero Squadron (Service), Formed February 1918, to AEF August 1918
- 355th Aero Squadron (Service), Formed May 1918, to AEF August 1918

After the November 1918 Armistice with Germany, those pilots who were in training were allowed to complete their studies, but no new cadets began training. The airfield was ordered closed in May 1919, and in December the flag was lowered for the last time.

=== Inter-war years ===
Although it was closed as a military airfield after World War I, aviation activity continued at Rich Field as a civil airport. Flying lessons were available and during the 1920s and 1930s traveling airshows occasionally visited Rich Field. Ford Trimotor offered the public a 10-minute flight to downtown Waco and back for one dollar. On one visit the Trimotor was put into a spin (without passengers) for show. For many years Braniff International Airways provided passenger service to Waco at Rich Field. The airport was closed near the beginning of World War II.

=== World War II ===
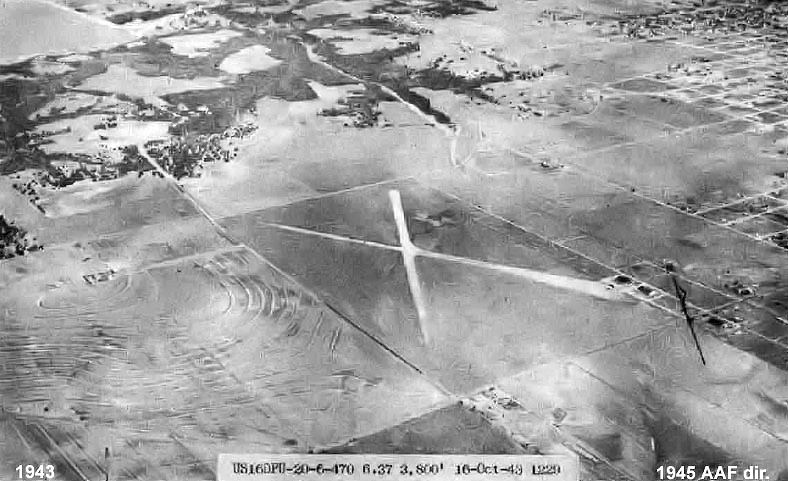
Rich Field, October 10, 1943

Rich Field was reopened as an auxiliary training field to Waco Army Airfield in 1942. Two hard-surface gravel runways were laid down in an "X" pattern, the northwest/southeast being 3,700 feet by 100 feet and the north-northwest/south-southeast runway being 3,500 feet by 100 feet. It may also have been used as a storage depot and limited civil flight operations during the war.

=== Closure and civil redevelopment ===
Flying ended from Rich Field after the end of World War II, and the site was subsequently used for two major civic facilities and numerous businesses. The Heart O' Texas Fairgrounds and coliseum were built in the 1950s; it is now known as Extraco Events Center. A high school was constructed on part of the site in the early 1960s and was called Richfield High School in honor of the former airfield. It was later renamed Waco High School.

== See also ==
- List of Training Section Air Service airfields
