= Ramey Air Force Base =

Former United States Air Force base in Aguadilla, Puerto Rico

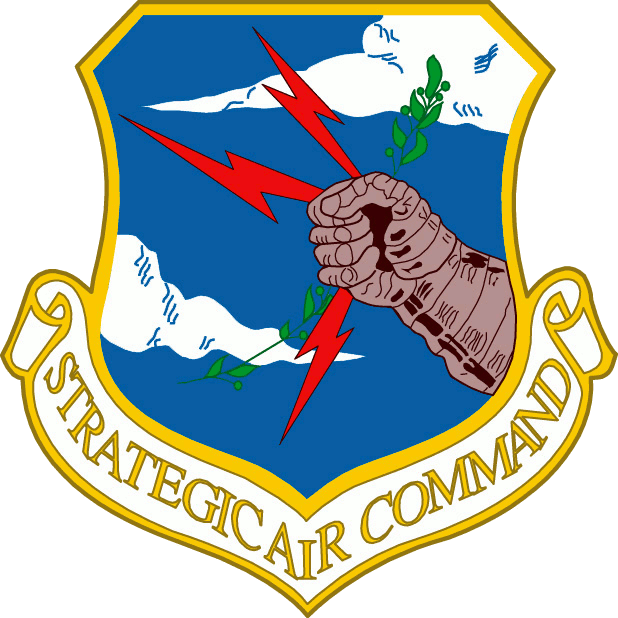
Ramey Air Force Base
- Part of the Strategic Air Command
- Aguadilla, Puerto Rico
- An October 1993 aerial photo of the base

Site information
- Type: Air Force Base
- Controlled by: Formerly the Strategic Air Command

Location
- Coordinates: 18°29′40″N 067°07′46″W

Site history
- Built: 1936
- In use: 1936–1971

Garrison information
- Garrison: None – base deactivated in 1973

Ramey Air Force Base also known as Borinquen Field, is a former United States Air Force base in Aguadilla, Puerto Rico. It was named after United States Army Air Forces Brigadier General Howard Knox Ramey. Following its closure, it was redeveloped into Rafael Hernandez Airport.

== History ==
=== Pre–World War II ===
In 1939, the U.S. Army Air Corps sent Major George C. Kenney to Puerto Rico to conduct a preliminary survey of possible air base sites on Puerto Rico. He examined 42 sites and declared Punta Borinquen the best site for a major air base. In September 1939, the government purchased 3,796 acres (1,536 ha) of sugar cane farms for military use, for $1,215,000. The area was also populated by Poblado San Antonio, in which construction caused hundreds of families to be expropriated from the land. Later that year, Major Karl S. Axtater assumed command of what was to become Borinquen Army Airfield.

The 1940 US Census counted enumeration district 22–32 as Borinquen Field in Aquadilla, Puerto Rico. Lt. Col. Karl S. Axtater, age 47, Post Commander, is the first person on the list of 942 personnel on the base in April 1940. Each servicemember reported rank, place of birth, and reported the location of their previous residence as of April 1935.

=== World War II era ===
During World War II, the following squadrons were assigned to the airfield:

- Headquarters, 25th Bombardment Group, 1 November 1940 – 1 November 1942; 5 October 1943 – 24 March 1944

417th Bombardment Squadron, 21 November 1939 – 13 April 1942 (Douglas B-18 Bolo)
10th Bombardment Squadron, 1 November 1940 – 1 November 1942 (B-18 Bolo)
12th Bombardment Squadron, 1 November 1940 – 8 November 1941 (B-18 Bolo)
35th Bombardment Squadron, 31 October-11 November 1941 (B-18 Bolo)

- 44th Bombardment Squadron (40th Bombardment Group) 1 April 1941 – 16 June 1942 (B-18 Bolo)
- 20th Troop Carrier Squadron (Panama Air Depot) June 1942 – July 1943 (Douglas C-47 Skytrain)
- 4th Tactical Reconnaissance Squadron (72d Reconnaissance Group) 27 October 1943 – 21 May 1945; 5 October 1945 – 20 August 1946

=== Cold War era ===
With the establishment of an independent United States Air Force in 1947, the complex was renamed Ramey Air Force Base in 1948. Ramey AFB was home to a succession of Strategic Air Command (SAC) strategic reconnaissance wings and a bombardment wing, and housed a number of B-36 Peacemaker intercontinental bombers, in its RB-36 strategic reconnaissance version. The RB-36s were later replaced by B-52 Stratofortress heavy bombers and KC-135 Stratotanker aerial refueling aircraft.

A tenant weather reconnaissance squadron operated WB-47 Stratojet and WC-130 Hercules aircraft. Due to the size and weight of the B-36, the runway at Ramey had to be built to a length of 11,702 feet (3,567 m) and a width of 200 feet (61 m), with an added 870 feet (270 m) Blast Pad at each end and an additional 50 feet (15 m) shoulder on each side. This led to the second expropriation of Poblado San Antonio, which led to the displacement of 4,000 inhabitants to San Antonio's current location in Montaña.

In 1971, the closure of Ramey Air Force Base began as part of a SAC-wide reduction in bombardment wings, and lasted until 1973. Following its closure, it was converted into a joint civilian-military airport, with the United States Coast Guard comprising the remaining military aviation activities at the airport as Coast Guard Air Station Borinquen and Puerto Rico Air National Guard, Army National Guard and the United States Army Reserve maintaining non-aviation units.

- Antilles Air Command, 1 March-25 August 1946

As: Antilles Air Division, 12 January 1948 – 22 January 1949

- 24th Composite Wing, 25 August 1946 – 28 June 1948
- 55th Strategic Reconnaissance Wing, 1 November 1950 – 1953
- 72nd Strategic Reconnaissance Wing, 1953 – 1959 (RB-36 Peacemaker)
- 72nd Bombardment Wing, 1959 – 30 June 1971 (B-52 Stratofortress)

=== U.S. Naval Facility Ramey/Punta Borinquen ===
In 1951–1952, success with a test array and then a full scale 40-element operational array at Eleuthera, Bahamas led the Navy in 1952 to order six (quickly expanded to nine) undersea surveillance systems under the classified name of Sound Surveillance System (SOSUS) to be installed under the unclassified name Project Caesar. The shore terminals were described as supporting "oceanographic research" and given the generic and ambiguous name "Naval Facility" with the actual submarine detection purpose classified on a strict need-to-know basis. The first of the systems was to terminate at a Naval Facility (NAVFAC) on a beach under the cliff of the Air Force Base (18°29′18.4″N 67°09′36.2″W). Construction began in 1953 with Naval Facility Ramey commissioned on 18 September 1954.

In 1985, with mobile, towed arrays entering the system, SOSUS became the Integrated Undersea Surveillance System (IUSS). SOSUS/IUSS mark their beginnings with the commissioning of Naval Facility Ramey.

The facility, unlike NAVFAC Grand Turk and NAVFAC San Salvador completed later that year and not close to a military base, got support for all functions except its classified operations from the base. In January 1974, the Air Force Base closed. The facility became Naval Facility Punta Borinquen and was self supporting until it was decommissioned in April 1976.

=== Remaining military presence ===
In 1971, as a result of the closing of Naval Air Station Isla Grande, the United States Coast Guard relocated its aviation activities to Ramey. In 1973, after the deactivation of Ramey AFB, the Coast Guard took possession of an outstanding hangar, a part of the Air Force housing area and the DoDEA Ramey Unit School for the newly formed Coast Guard Air Station Borinquen in 1976. The Coast Guard Exchange system operates a post exchange (PX) near by the coast guard housing area. The Punta Borinquen Light was transferred to the Coast Guard and converted to MWR Guest Housing.

The United States Army Reserve has presence at Ramey, such as the 77th Combat Sustainment Support Battalion from the 210th Regional Support Group at the Ramey United States Army Reserve Center.

In 2023, the Army Reserve 81st Readiness Division opened an additional $18.7 million Army Reserve Center at Ramey for the 35th Expeditionary Signal Battalion Bravo Company.

The Puerto Rico Army National Guard has units and facilities at the former Air Force Base, such as the 770th Military Police Company.

The Puerto Rico Air National Guard keep the Punta Borinquen Radar Station near the Ramey Golf Course, home for the 141st Air Control Squadron.

In 2025, Ramey AFB saw an increase in military presence including US Air Force General Atomics MQ-9 Reaper drones operated by the 163rd Attack Wing for counter-narcotics operations in the Caribbean.

Nicolas Maduro, former president of Venezuela, first stopped on American territory at Ramey after his capture in the 2026 United States strikes in Venezuela.

== See also ==
- Transport in Puerto Rico
- List of airports in Puerto Rico
- Coast Guard Air Station Borinquen
- Punta Borinquen Light
- Punta Borinquen Radar Station
- Rafael Hernández Airport
- Military of Puerto Rico
