= 59th Bombardment Squadron =

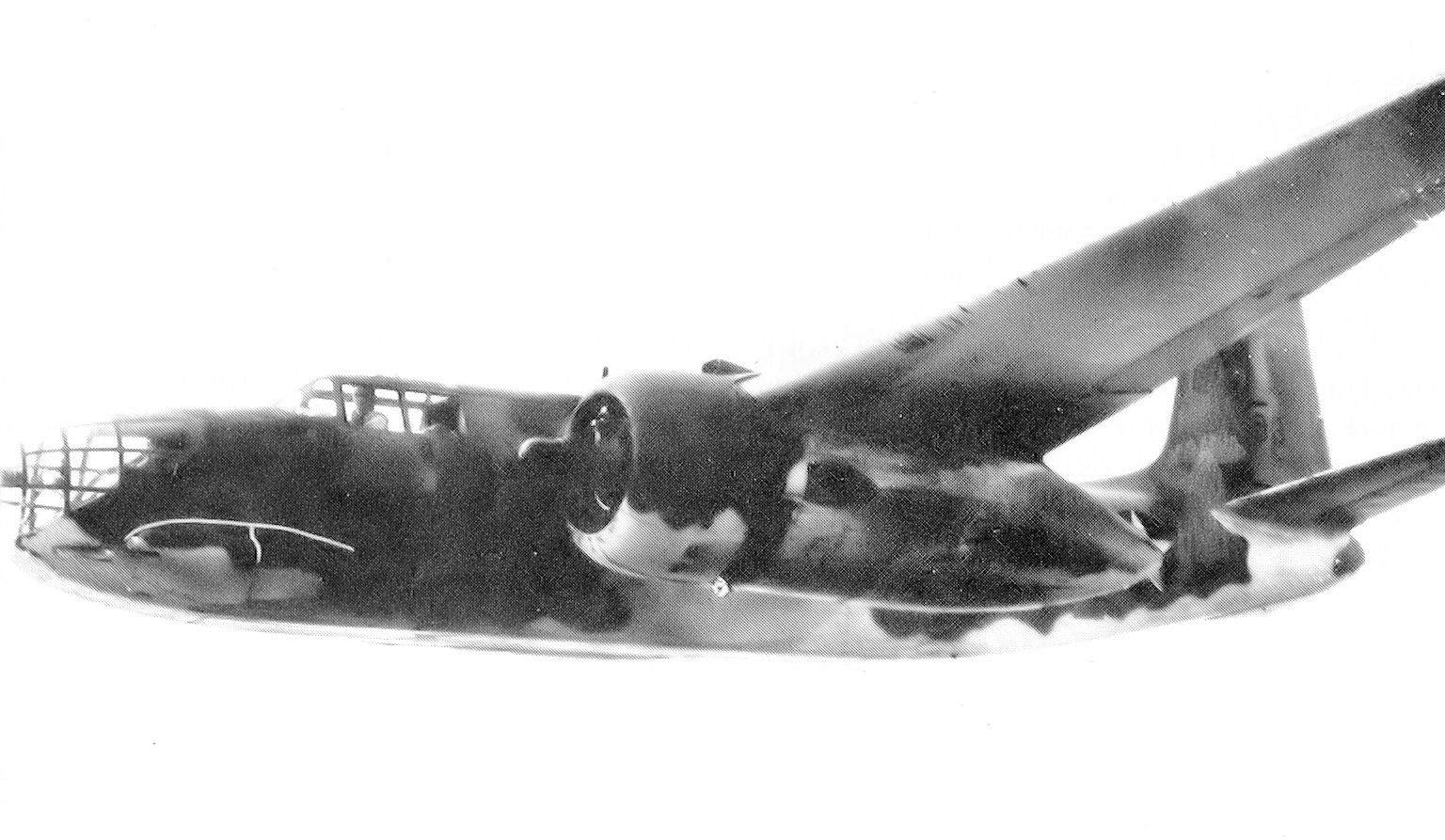
- 59th Bombardment Squadron A-20 Havoc (Note: Aircraft is Douglas A-20A Havoc, serial 40-93, taken in 1943.)
- Active: 1941–1944; 1947–1951
- Role: Bombardment
- Engagements: American Theater Antisubmarine Campaign

The 59th Bombardment Squadron is an inactive United States Air Force unit. It was first activated in Panama in 1941 during the expansion of the United States Army Air Corps before World War II. Following the Attack on Pearl Harbor the squadron participated in antisubmarine patrols in the Caribbean Sea and adjoining waters. When the United States Navy assumed this mission in 1943, the squadron moved to the United States and was disbanded.

The squadron was reactivated in the reserve in 1947 and assigned to the 319th Bombardment Group. After 1949, it trained with Douglas B-26 Invader light bombers at Birmingham Municipal Airport. It was mobilized for the Korean War in March 1951 and its personnel used as replacements for other organizations before inactivating on 22 March 1951.

== History ==
=== World War II ===
The squadron was activated as the 59th Bombardment Squadron (Light) on 1 January 1941, and assigned to the Panama Canal Department. It drew its cadre from elements of the 9th Bombardment Group and was equipped with Douglas A-20A Havocs. The next day, the squadron was further assigned to the 19th Bombardment Wing and, on 6 January, attached to the 9th Bombardment Group, which had recently moved to Panama. The unit spent its first 10 months of existence at Rio Hato Army Air Base, where they were housed in tents, while they built more permanent wooded barracks.

This unit was attached to the 9th Group specifically to support the Panama Mobile Force. It was assigned to the VI Bomber Command on 18 September 1941. The Squadron received new Douglas A-20A Havocs by May 1942. The unit moved from Rio Hato to the new Howard Field on 28 October 1941 and, shortly after the Japanese Attack on Pearl Harbor, was dispersed to Aguadulce Army Air Field.

The 59th's mission included close-in anti-submarine "offensive" patrols, rapid reconnaissance of and offense against potential amphibious landings or advances of enemy ground forces which might eventuate, direct support of friendly ground forces and, in exactly these words, "use as attack aviation in combination with other Air Forces, Parachute Troops and Airborne Infantry in support of friendly Latin American governments" as needed.

A month after the Pearl Harbor Attack, B and C Flights were detached from the squadron and attached to the VI Interceptor Command at Hato Field, Curaçao and Dakota Field, Aruba. They remained attached until finally assigned to what was now VI Fighter Command on 23 June. The main squadron remained at Aguadulce Field, Panama until it joined the Flights in the Antilles on 10 March. The arrival of the detachments in Aruba and Curaçao was timely as on 16 February 1942, one of the A-20A made the first Command attack on a German U-Boat when a sub was attacked eight miles off Willemstad. Over the next five days, not fewer than time attacks were made on submarines, following by 10 more through January 1943.

On 19 March 1943, the squadron was assigned directly subordinate to the Antilles Air Task Force. However, the squadron was attached to the 25th Bombardment Group and remained under its operational control as late as 26 April 1943. This attachment lasted until 19 July, when the unit was attached to the Trinidad Detachment, VI Fighter Command, Antilles Air Command. Meanwhile, the unit itself had been redesignated, on 10 June 1943, as the 59th Bombardment Squadron (Medium).

By 12 July 1943, by now located at Edinburgh Field, Trinidad and two North American B-25D Mitchells and two B-25Gs had been received. By the end of 1943 the A-20s had been replaced by B-25G's and the Squadron was moved to Beane Field on St Lucia. When the Navy took over responsibility for antisubmarine warfare during the summer of 1943, the 59th, and other bombardment units in the Caribbean became a reserve strike force and its mission was training and participation in exercises until March 1944, when it moved to the United States.

Shortly after its arrival at Alamogordo Army Air Field, New Mexico, the squadron was disbanded on 20 June 1944. Many of its personnel were used to support training for the Boeing B-29 Superfortress program, which was organizing units at the time.

=== Air Force reserve ===
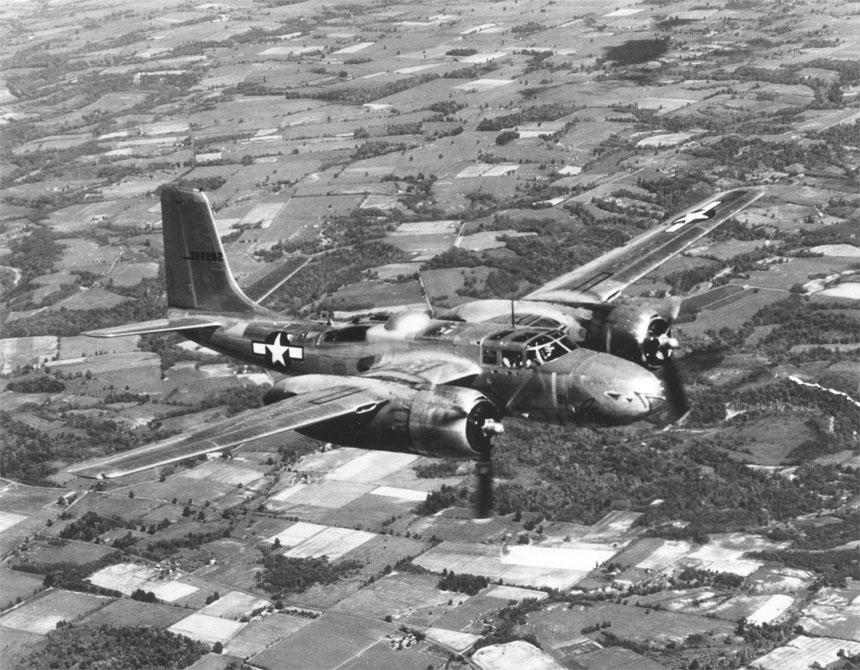
A-26 Invader in flight

The squadron was reconstituted and activated in the reserve under Air Defense Command (ADC) at Mitchel Field, New York in July 1947 and assigned to the 319th Bombardment Group. At Mitchel, the squadron trained under the supervision of the 113th AAF Base Unit (later the 2230 Air Force Reserve Training Center), although it is not clear whether it was fully manned or equipped during this period. In July 1948 Continental Air Command (ConAC) assumed responsibility for managing reserve and Air National Guard units from ADC. The 59th's stay at Mitchel ended when ConAC reorganized its reserve units under the wing base organization system in June 1949.

The squadron moved on paper to Reading Municipal Airport, Pennsylvania, where it replaced elements of the 322d Bombardment Group. At Reading, the squadron trained under the supervision of the 2237th Air Force Reserve Training Center. The squadron was authorized manning of only 25% of normal strength. Runway length at Reading, however, led ConAC to decide to station a troop carrier unit there, and the squadron was inactivated on 2 October 1949 and its personnel were transferred to the 329th Troop Carrier Squadron.

The squadron activated again about a month later, on 10 October 1949, at Birmingham Municipal Airport, Alabama, where it replaced the 338th Troop Carrier Squadron. The squadron flew the Douglas B-26 Invader at Birmingham, where training was conducted by the 2587th Air Force Reserve Training Center. All reserve combat and corollary units were mobilized for the Korean War, and the 59th was called up on 10 March 1951. Its personnel and aircraft were used as fillers for other units, and the squadron was inactivated on 22 March.

== Lineage ==
- Constituted as the 59th Bombardment Squadron (Light) on 14 December 1940

Activated on 2 January 1941
Redesignated 59th Bombardment Squadron (Medium) on 10 June 1943
Disbanded on 20 June 1944

- Reconstituted, and redesignated 59th Bombardment Squadron, Light on 26 May 1947

Activated in the reserve on 9 July 1947

- Inactivated on 2 September 1949

Activated in the reserve on 10 October 1949
Ordered to active service on 10 March 1951
Inactivated on 22 March 1951

=== Assignments ===
- Panama Canal Department, 1 January 1941
- 19th Bombardment Wing, 2 January 1941 (attached to 9th Bombardment Group, 6 January 1941 – 21 July 1942)
- VI Bomber Command, 25 October 1941 (attached to Trinidad Detachment, VI Fighter Command after 21 July 1942)
- Antilles Air Task Force, 19 March 1943 (attached to 25th Bombardment Group but under operational control of a detachment of Antilles Air Task Force, 26 April 1943 – 1 August 1943
- 25th Bombardment Group, 11 October 1943 – 20 June 1944
- 319th Bombardment Group, 9 July 1947 – 2 September 1949
- 319th Bombardment Group, 10 October 1949-22 March 1951

=== Stations ===
- Rio Hato Army Air Base, Panama, 1 January 1941
- Howard Field, Panama Canal Zone, 28 October 1941
- Aguadulce Army Air Field, Panama, 11 December 1941

Detachment operated from Hato Field, Curaçao, c. 13 January 1942
Detachment operated from Dakota Field, Aruba, C. 14 January—c. 24 September 1942

- Howard Field, Panama Canal Zone, 19 February 1942
- Hato Field, Curaçao, 10 March 1942
- Edinburgh Field, Trinidad, 12 July 1943
- Beane Field, St Lucia, 20 October 1943 – 24 March 1944
- Alamogordo Army Air Field, New Mexico, c. 7 April–20 June 1944
- Mitchel Field, New York, 9 July 1947
- Reading Municipal Airport, Pennsylvania, 27 June–2 September 1949
- Birmingham Municipal Airport, Alabama, 10 October 1949 – 22 March 1951

=== Aircraft ===
- Douglas A-20 Havoc, 1941–1943
- Douglas B-18 Bolo, 1943–1944
- North American B-25 Mitchell, 1943–1944
- Douglas B-26 Invader, 1949–1951
