= Antilles Air Command =

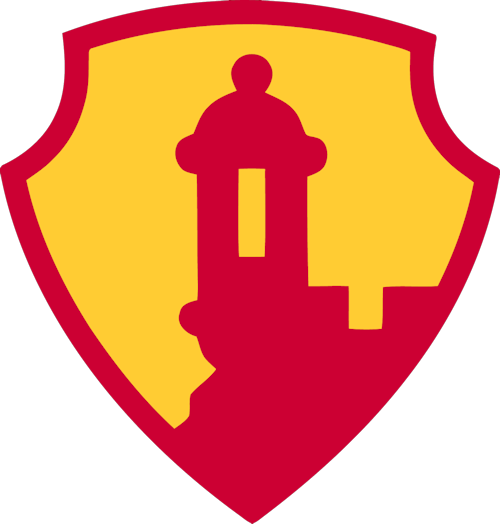
- Active: 1943–1946
- Country: United States
- Branch: US Army Air Forces
- Role: Command of tactical units
- Part of: Antilles Department
- Engagements: American Campaign Streamer

Commanders
- Notable commanders: MG Edwin J. House (March 1943-May 1943) BG Edwin B. Lyon (May 1943-January 1944) COL Bayard Johnson (January 1944-February 1944) BG Wolcott P. Hayes (February 1944-December 1944) BG George G. Lundberg (February 1945-August 1946)

The Antilles Air Command (AAC) was a unit of the United States Army Air Forces. The unit was established by the breakup of the Caribbean Defense Command - its Puerto Rico and Panama Sectors became the Antilles Air Task Force in February, 1943. Redesignated Antilles Air Command June 1943. Its last assignment was with Sixth Air Force, based at Borinquen Field, Puerto Rico, where it was inactivated on 25 August 1946.

Engaged in antisubmarine operations, 1941–1945. Disbanded on 8 October 1948

== Stations ==
- San Juan, Puerto Rico, 1 March 1943
- Borinquen Field, Puerto Rico, 1 March 1943 – 25 August 1946

== Components ==
- Sixth Air Force, 20 February 1943 – 25 August 1946
- Trinidad Wing, 1 March 1943 – 15 March 1944
- 4th Tactical Reconnaissance Squadron, 11 July 1941 – 29 March 1942

Attached to Puerto Rican Department: 29 March 1942-23 March 1943
Attached to Antilles Air Task Force: 23 March-1 June 1943
Assigned to Antilles Air Command: 1 July 1943-25 August 1946

- 23d Antisubmarine Squadron:

Attached to Trinidad Wing, Antilles Air Command: 5 August–December 1943

- 32d Fighter Squadron: 3 August 1943 – 13 March 1944
- 59th Bombardment Squadron: 19 March-26 April 1943

Detached to 25th Bombardment Squadron: 26 April-1 August 1943

- 91st Reconnaissance Squadron

Attached: 26 July-21 October 1948
Assigned: 21 October 1948-22 January 1949

- 101st Bombardment (Photographic) Squadron

Attached to Trinidad Sector and Base Command, 6 August 1942-1 June 1943
Assigned to Antilles Air Command: 1 June 1943-15 March 1944
