= 12th Air Division =

- Active: 1940–1942; 1942–1944; 1947–1949; 1951–1990
- Country: United States
- Branch: United States Air Force
- Role: Command of Strategic strike forces

Insignia
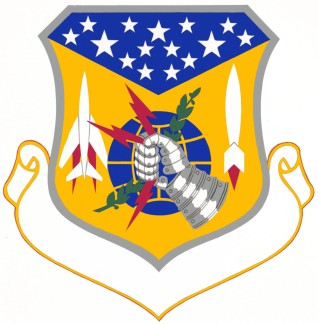
- 12th Air Division emblem (approved 30 December 1988)

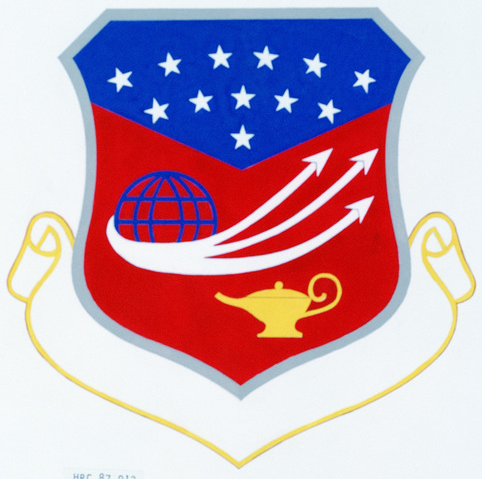
- 12th Air Division emblem (approved c. December 1986)

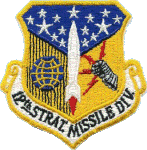
- Patch with 12th Strategic Missile Division emblem

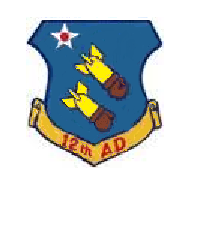
- 12th Air Division emblem (approved 16 April 1952)

The 12th Air Division was a United States Air Force unit. Its last assignment was with the Eighth Air Force, based at Ellsworth Air Force Base, South Dakota. It was inactivated on 31 July 1990.

== History ==
The division was established as the 12th Pursuit Wing in the Panama Canal Zone on 20 November 1940. The organization commanded pursuit groups and squadrons for Sixth Air Force until 6 March 1942.

It was reassigned to Eighth Air Force in England during November 1942 as a bombardment wing, but never made operational . All personnel and equipment were withdrawn in January 1943, and the organization did not serve in combat.

Reactivated in 1951, the 12th Air Division was an intermediate command echelon of Strategic Air Command. It conducted training for worldwide bombardment operations. From 1963 to 1984 and 1988–1990. It maintained an intercontinental ballistic missile capability, conducted staff assistance visits, and monitored programs such as retention, domestic actions, and medical capabilities of its subordinate units.

Its mission was to assure unit Emergency War Order (EWO) capability and combat crew training conducted at Castle and Dyess Air Force Bases, continually evaluate qualification training, direct correction or improvement when appropriate, and represent training concerns to higher headquarters.

It was inactivated in 1990 as part of the military drawdown of the USAF after the end of the Cold War.

== Lineage ==
- Established as the 12th Pursuit Wing on 19 October 1940

Activated on 20 November 1940
Inactivated on 6 March 1942

- Redesignated: 12th Bombardment Wing on 23 August 1942

Activated on 8 September 1942
Disestablished on 9 October 1944

- Reestablished and redesignated 12th Bombardment Wing, Light on 3 July 1947

Activated in the Reserve on 3 August 1947
Redesignated: 12th Air Division, Bombardment on 16 April 1948
Inactivated on 27 June 1949

- Redesignated: 12th Air Division on 1 February 1951

Organized on 10 February 1951
Discontinued on 16 June 1952

- Activated on 16 June 1952

Redesignated: 12th Strategic Aerospace Division on 1 June 1962
Redesignated: 12th Strategic Missile Division on 30 June 1971
Redesignated: 12th Air Division on 1 March 1973
Inactivated on 31 July 1990

=== Assignments ===
- Unknown, 20 November 1940
- 6th Interceptor Command, 25 October 1941 – 6 March 1942
- Eighth Air Force, 8 September 1942
- VIII Bomber Command (later, Eighth Air Force), c. December 1942 – 9 October 1944
- Eleventh Air Force, 3 August 1947
- First Air Force, 1 July 1948
- Ninth Air Force, 23 February – 27 June 1949
- Fifteenth Air Force, 10 February 1951 – 16 June 1952
- Fifteenth Air Force, 16 June 1952
- Eighth Air Force, 1 July 1989 – 31 July 1990

=== Components ===
Wings

- 6th Strategic Aerospace Wing (later 6th Strategic Wing): 1 July 1965 – 25 March 1967; 2 July 1968 – 30 June 1971
- 22d Bombardment Wing (later 22d Air Refueling Wing): 10 February 1951 – 1 January 1962 (detached 5 September – 4 December 1951, 7 December 1953 – 5 March 1954, 1 April – 5 July 1957); 1 August 1972 – 1 October 1985
- 28th Bombardment Wing: 15 July 1988 – 31 July 1990
- 44th Bombardment Wing (later 44 Strategic Missile Wing): 10 February – 4 August 1951; 15 July 1988 – 31 July 1990
- 55th Strategic Reconnaissance Wing: 2 July 1966 – 30 June 1971; 1 October 1982 – 1 October 1985
- 93d Bombardment Wing: 1 October 1985 – 15 July 1988
- 95th Bombardment Wing: 1 July 1964 – 25 June 1966
- 96th Bombardment Wing: 1 July 1973 – 15 July 1988
- 99th Strategic Weapons Wing: 10 August 1989 – 31 July 1990
- 100th Strategic Reconnaissance Wing (later 100 Air Refueling Wing): 25 June 1966 – 30 June 1971; 1 August 1972 – 30 September 1976
- 106th Bombardment Wing: by September 1951 – 1 December 1952
- 303d Bombardment Wing: 15 March 1960 – 15 June 1964
- 308th Strategic Missile Wing: 30 June 1971 – 1 April 1973
- 320th Bombardment Wing: 1 December 1952 – 15 September 1960 (detached 3 June – 4 September 1954, 5 October 1956 – 11 January 1957); 23 January 1987 – 15 July 1988
- 330th Bombardment Wing: attached 1 May – 16 June 1951 (not operational for entire period)
- 381st Strategic Missile Wing: 30 June 1971 – 1 July 1973
- 384th Air Refueling Wing: 1 December 1972 – 1 July 1973
- 390th Strategic Missile Wing: 1 January 1962 – 31 July 1984
- 4080th Strategic Wing: 12 July 1963 – 25 June 1966

Groups

- 16th Pursuit Group: c. 1 December 1940-c. 6 March 1942
- 32d Pursuit Group: c. 1 January 1941-c. 6 March 1942
- 37th Pursuit Group: c. 1 February 1940 – 6 March 1942
- 53d Pursuit Group: c. 1 January – 6 March 1942
- 321st Bombardment Group: 17 October 1947 – 27 June 1949
- 322d Bombardment Group: 17 October 1947 – 27 June 1949

=== Stations ===
- Albrook Field, Panama Canal Zone, 10 November 1940 – 6 March 1942
- MacDill Field, Florida, 8 September – 28 November 1942
- Gourock, Scotland, 15 – 16 December 1942
- RAF Chelveston (AAF-105), England, c. 17 December 1942 – 12 January 1943
- Marks Hall (AAF-160), England, 12 January 1943 – 9 October 1944
- Cleveland Municipal Airport, Ohio, 3 August 1947 – 27 June 1949
- March Air Force Base, California, 10 February 1951 – 16 June 1952
- March Air Force Base, California, 16 June 1952
- Davis Monthan Air Force Base, Arizona, 1 January 1962
- Dyess Air Force Base, Texas, 30 September 1976
- Ellsworth Air Force Base, South Dakota, 15 July 1988 – 31 July 1990

=== Aircraft and Missiles ===
- Boeing P-26 Peashooter, 1941–1942
- Curtiss P-36 Hawk, 1941–1942
- Lockheed P-38 Lightning, 1941–1942
- Bell P-39 Airacobra, 1941–1942
- Curtiss P-40 Warhawk, 1941–1942
- Boeing B-29 Superfortress, 1951–1953
- Douglas C-47 Skytrain, 1951
- Boeing TB-29 Superfortress, 1951
- Boeing KC-97 Stratofreighter, 1952–1962
- Boeing B-47 Stratojet, 1953–1964
- Boeing YRB-47 Stratojet, 1953–1954
- Boeing B-52 Stratofortress, 1963–1967, 1972–1988
- Boeing KC-135 Stratotanker, 1963–1971, 1972–1988
- LGM-25C Titan II, 1963–1984
- Sikorsky CH-3, 1966–1971, 1972–1976
- Lockheed DC-130 Hercules, 1966–1971, 1972–1976
- Boeing EB/RB-47 Stratojet, 1966–1967
- Ryan AQM-34 Firebee (drone), c. 1966–1971, 1972–1976
- Boeing RC-135, 1966–1971
- Lockheed U-2, 1966–1971, 1972–1976
- Lockheed WU-2, 1966-c. 1969
- Convair T-29 Flying Classroom, 1973
- McDonnell Douglas KC-10 Extender, 1982–1985
- Boeing NKC-135 Stratotanker (test configured), 1983–1985
- Rockwell B-1 Lancer, 1985–1990
- LGM-30F Minuteman II, 1988–1990

=== Heraldry ===
Or, a globe azure grid lined of the first between in dexter an airplane palewise ascending argent, exhaust gules and in sinister a missile palewise of the like, overall a gauntlet of the third, grasping an olive branch vert and a lightning flash of the fourth bend sinisterwise and two lightning flashes of the last bendwise, on a chief of the second per chevron inverted seme of mullets argent; all within a diminished bordure of argent (silver gray).

== See also ==
- List of United States Air Force air divisions
