= 51st Fighter Squadron =

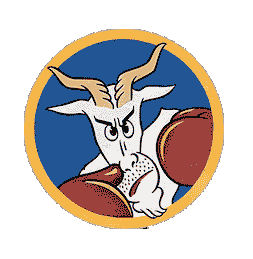
- Emblem of the 51st Fighter Squadron
- Active: 1941-1946
- Country: United States
- Branch: United States Air Force
- Role: Fighter Squadron

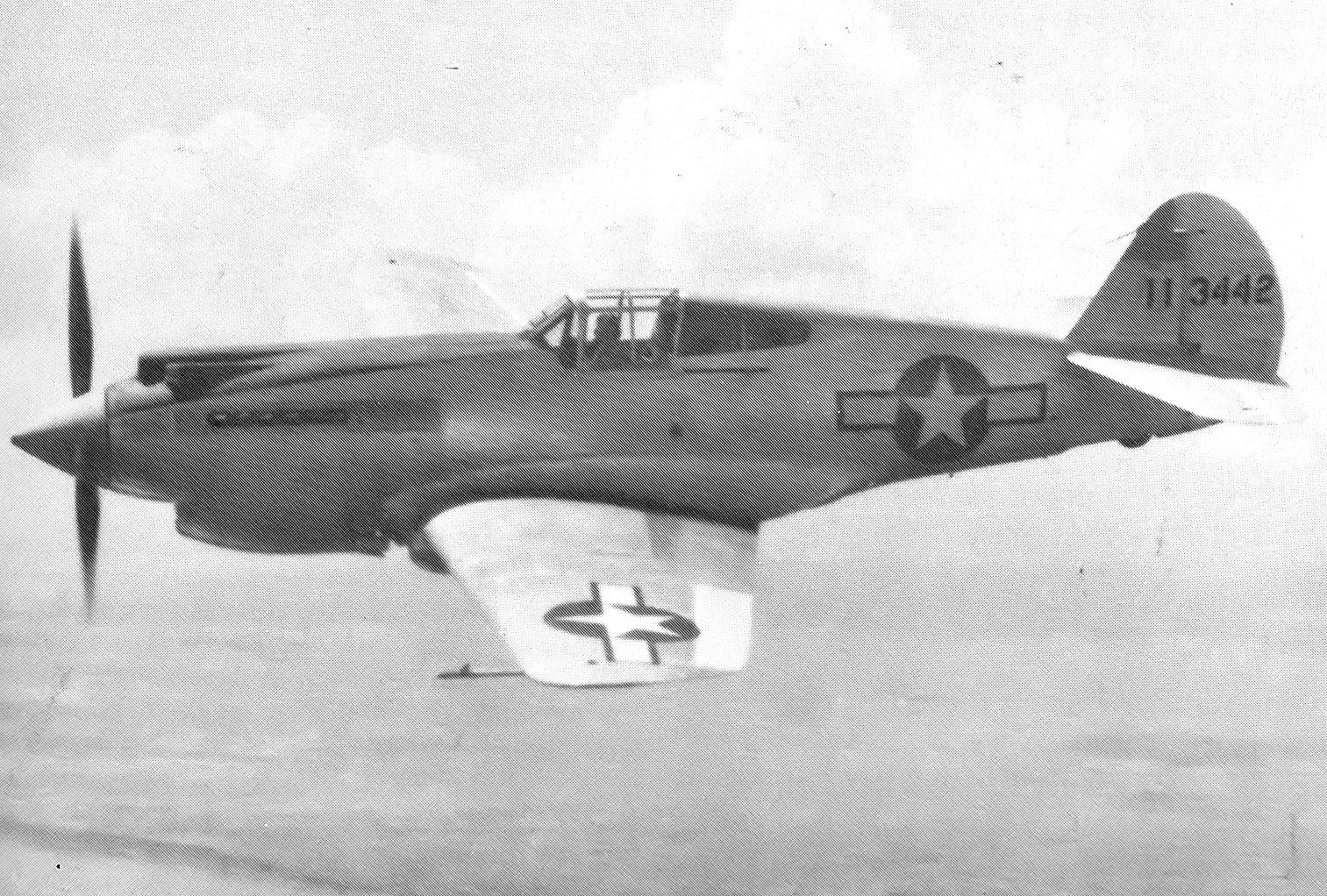
51st Fighter Squadron Curtiss P-40C 41-13442

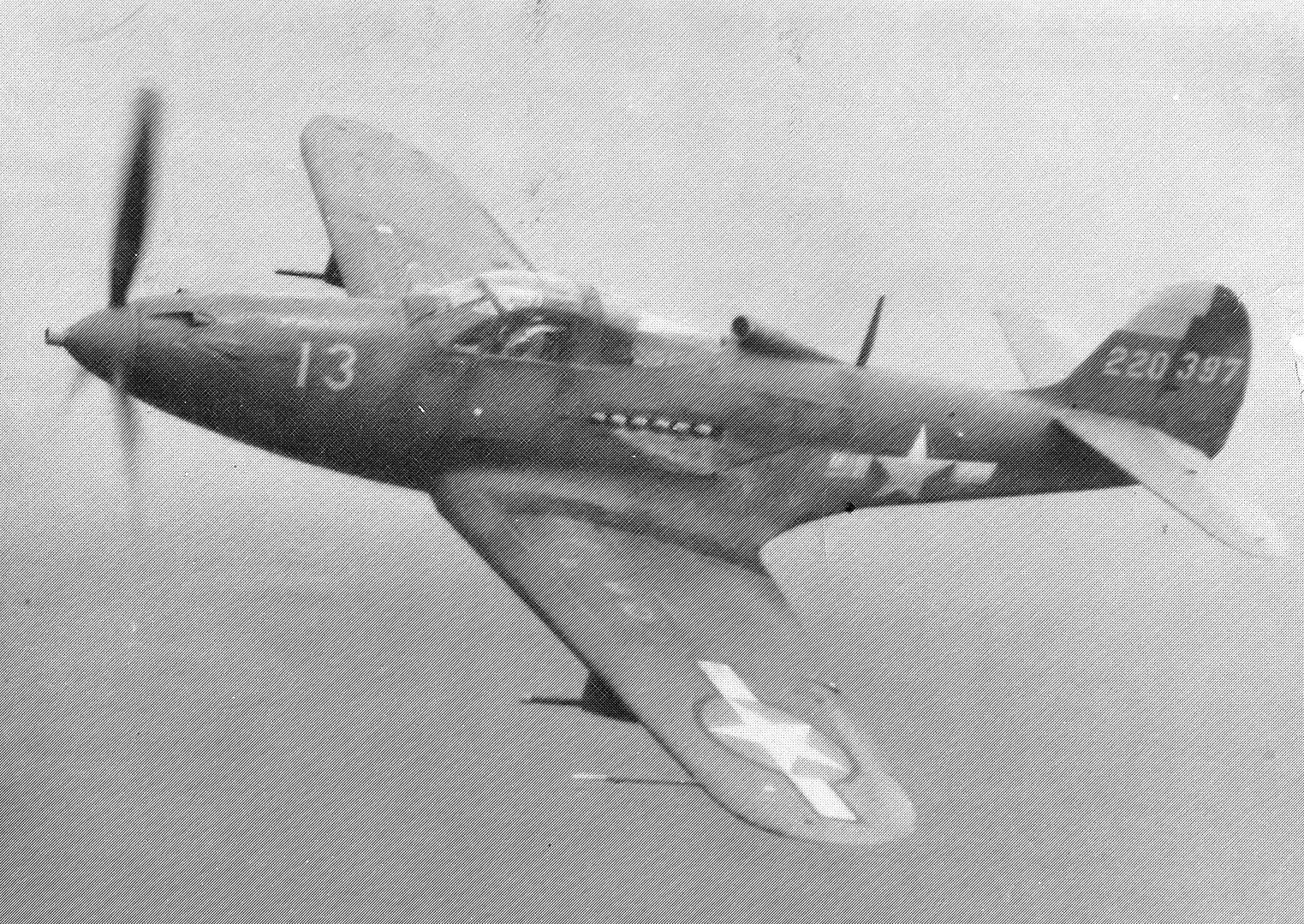
51st Fighter Squadron Bell P-39Q-5-BE Airacobra 42-2039

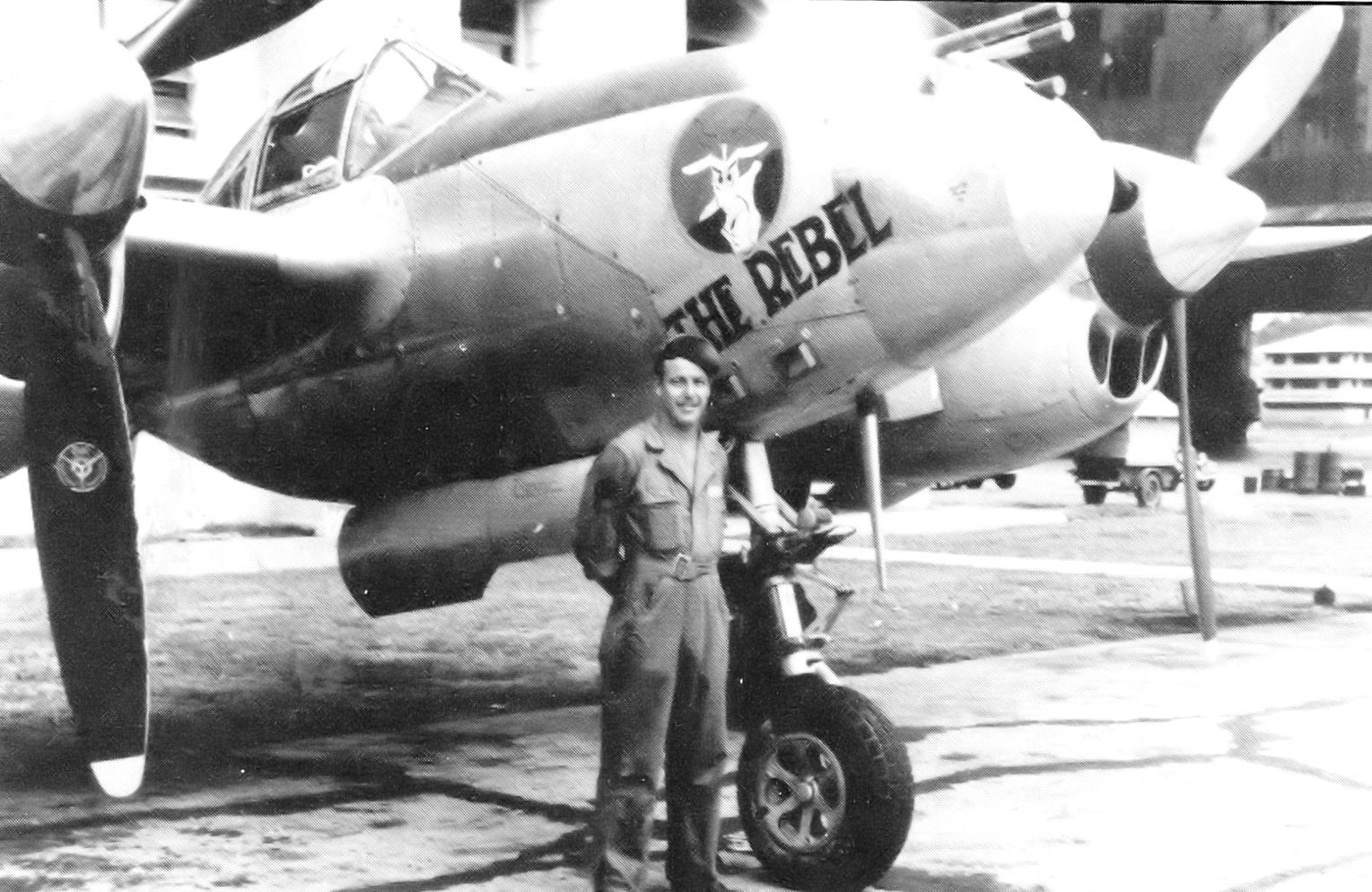
51st Fighter Squadron P-38 Lightning with squadron emblem

The 51st Fighter Squadron is an inactive United States Air Force unit. Its last assignment was with the 6th Fighter Wing, based at Howard Field, Canal Zone. It was inactivated on 15 October 1946.

== History ==
Activated on 1 January 1941 as one of the three squadrons assigned to the 32d Pursuit Group as part of the United States buildup of forces after the eruption of World War II. This unit was organized, initially, to train new pilots sent directly from flight schools in the United States. The squadron was equipped with Curtiss P-36A Hawks and Boeing P-26A Peashooters drawn from the 16th and 37th Pursuit Groups. After being formed at Albrook Field, Panama Canal Zone, the squadron was moved to Río Hato Army Air Base, Panama.

After the Japanese Pearl Harbor Attack, the squadron x was moved to Howard Field near the Panama Canal to provide air defense of the Pacific side. At Howard, the squadron received more capable Curtiss P-40 Warhawks, with the squadron being moved to France Field. Just as soon as the squadron settled into France Field, a detachment was sent north to Guatemala City Air Base to perform air defense and coastal patrols.

As the war threat to the Panama Canal diminished during 1942, the squadron was transferred to Seymour Island Army Airfield in the Galapagos Islands. In addition, a detachment was sent to Salinas Airport, Ecuador ("C" Flight); Talara Airport, Peru ("D" Flight) however the detachment at Guatemala City, Guatemala remained and was designed as "E" Flight. The aircraft in the Galapagos were transferred from the 52d Fighter Squadron and flown from Salinas Airport, Ecuador with external fuel tanks, being escorted by a B-24D Liberator for navigational purposes. This was the first time Seymour Field had been equipped with fighters for air defense. It became apparent very quickly, however, that the dispersion wasn't a very good idea and, between 10 and 19 March 1943, the outlying flights were consolidated at Albrook Field. The personnel at Seymour were re-designated as the 51st Fighter Squadron.

By October 1943, the squadron began transitioning to Bell P-39Q Airacobras. In November, its parent 32d Fighter Group was disbanded and the squadron was assigned directly to the XXVI Fighter Command. Moved to Howard Field in November 1944, the 51st began receiving Lockheed P-38 Lightnings.

With the end of the war in Europe, the entire complement of P-38s was hangared and the unit activities ran down. The squadron ceased all flying activities in June, and the P-38s were stored in a hangar at Howard. By October 1945, the squadron was reduced to a non-operational administrative organization. Inactivated on 15 October 1946.

=== Heraldry ===
Over and through a light blue violet disc, border yellow orange, the head and shoulders of a caricatured, butting, wild, white goat, outlined black, horns tan, wearing brown boxing gloves, having a pugnacious attitude, and brushing nose with thumb of right glove. (Approved 6 April 1944. )

=== Lineage ===
- Constituted 51st Pursuit Squadron (Fighter) on 22 November 1940

Activated on 1 January 1941
Redesignated 51st Fighter Squadron on 15 May 1942
Inactivated on 15 October 1946

=== Assignments ===
- 32d Pursuit (later Fighter) Group, 1 January 1941
- XXVI Fighter Command, 1 November 1943
- 6th Fighter Wing, 25 August 1945 – 15 October 1946

=== Stations ===
- Rio Hato AAB, Panama, 1 January 1941
- Albrook Field, Canal Zone, 1 January 1941
- Rio Hato AAB, Panama, c. 21 August 1941
- Howard Field, Canal Zone, 10 December 1941
- France Field, Canal Zone, 23 December 1941

Detachment at Guatemala City AAB, Guatemala, January 1942 – 9 March 1943

- Seymour Island Army Airfield, Baltra, Galápagos Islands, c. 9 December 1942

Detachments at Salinas Afld, Ecuador, and Talora Afld, Peru, December 1942 – 9 March 1943

- La Chorrera AAF, Panama, c. 4 March 1944
- Howard Field, Canal Zone, c. 10 June 1944 – 15 October 1946

=== Aircraft ===
- P-26 Peashooter, 1941
- P-36 Hawk, 1941–1942
- P-40 Warhawk, 1942–1944
- P-39 Airacobra, 1943–1945
- P-38 Lightning, 1944–1946
