= 944th Fighter Wing =

US Air Force unit

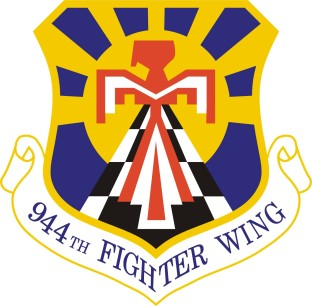
- Unit emblem
- Active: 1 July 1987 – present
- Country: United States
- Branch: United States Air Force
- Type: Operational wing
- Role: Fighter training
- Size: c. 2,500 personnel
- Part of: Air Force Reserve Command (Tenth Air Force)
- Base: Luke Air Force Base, Arizona
- Website: Official website

Commanders
- Current commander: Colonel Todd D. Riddle

Insignia
- Tail code: LR

Aircraft flown
- Fighter: F-15E Strike Eagle; F-16 Fighting Falcon; F-35A Lightning II

The 944th Fighter Wing is an Air Reserve component of the United States Air Force. It is assigned to Tenth Air Force, Air Force Reserve Command, stationed at Luke Air Force Base, Arizona.

The 944th is an associate unit of the 56th Fighter Wing of Air Combat Command (ACC) and if mobilized the wing is gained by ACC.

== Overview ==
The mission of the 944th Fighter Wing is to train and provide combat ready airmen. During peacetime, the 944th trains reservists for worldwide deployments and has participated in real-world operational deployments in support of Operation Provide Comfort II and Operation Northern Watch (Northern Iraq), and Operation Deny Flight/Operation Decisive Edge (missions over Bosnia-Herzegovina), Operation Southern Watch (Southern Iraq) and has flown combat missions during Operation Enduring Freedom. Additionally, after the events of 11 September 2001, approximately 100 reservists (The majority from the 944th Security Forces Squadron) were mobilized in direct support of Operation Enduring Freedom and Operation Noble Eagle.

The unit reports to headquarters, Tenth Air Force at Naval Air Station Fort Worth Joint Reserve Base Carswell, Texas. Within the active Air Force, the wing was previously gained by the former Tactical Air Command and its successor, the Air Combat Command. It is currently gained by Air Education and Training Command.

The unit has an authorized strength of 850 personnel. Roughly one-quarter (135) of assigned personnel are full-time Air Reserve Technicians who provide continuity between weekend training periods. The annual payroll comes to almost $22 million. The value of unit resources, weapon systems, capital assets, and inventory comes to almost $300 million. The unit maintains facilities housing over 207,300 square feet (approximately 19.7 percent of Luke Air Force Base facility space).

The majority of personnel are traditional reservists that meet during one required weekend unit training assembly each month, augmented by numerous additional weekends and weekdays in an additional drill or active duty status. The reservists represent a wide variety of civilian careers, including airline pilots, doctors, engineers, elected officials, teachers, plumbers, mechanics, corporate managers and local, state and federal government employees.

== Units ==
- 944th Operations Group
  - 52nd Fighter Squadron
  - 69th Fighter Squadron
  - Detachment 1
  - 944 Operations Support Flight
- 944th Mission Support Group
  - 944th Communications Squadron
  - 944th Civil Engineer Squadron
  - 944th Force Support Squadron
  - 944th Logistics Readiness Squadron
  - 944th Security Forces Squadron
- 924th Fighter Group
  - 47th Fighter Squadron
  - 924th Maintenance Squadron
- 414th Fighter Group
  - 307th Fighter Squadron
  - 414th Maintenance Squadron
- 944th Aeromedical Staging Squadron
- 944th Medical Squadron

== History ==
=== Need for reserve troop carrier groups ===
After May 1959, the reserve flying force consisted of 45 troop carrier squadrons assigned to 15 troop carrier wings. (Note: There were an additional four rescue squadrons not assigned to the wings. Cantwell, p. 156) The squadrons were not all located with their parent wings, but were spread over thirty-five Air Force, Navy and civilian airfields under what was called the Detached Squadron Concept. The concept offered several advantages. Communities were more likely to accept the smaller squadrons than the large wings and the location of separate squadrons in smaller population centers would facilitate recruiting and manning. However, under this concept, all support organizations were located with the wing headquarters. Although this was not a problem when the entire wing was called to active service, mobilizing a single flying squadron and elements to support it proved difficult. This weakness was demonstrated in the partial mobilization of reserve units during the Berlin Crisis of 1961. To resolve this, at the start of 1962, Continental Air Command, (ConAC) determined to reorganize its reserve wings by establishing groups with support elements for each of its troop carrier squadrons. This reorganization would facilitate mobilization of elements of wings in various combinations when needed.

=== Activation of the 944th Troop Carrier Group ===
As a result, the 944th Troop Carrier Group was established at March Air Force Base, California on 17 January 1963 as the headquarters for the 730th Troop Carrier Squadron, which had been stationed there since October 1960. Along with group headquarters, a Combat Support Squadron, Materiel Squadron and a Tactical Infirmary were organized to support the 729th. The group was equipped with Fairchild C-119 Flying Boxcars for Tactical Air Command airlift operations.

The group was one of four C-119 groups assigned to the 452d Troop Carrier Wing in 1963. The others were the 942d and 943d Troop Carrier Groups, also at March, and the 945th Troop Carrier Group at Hill Air Force Base, Utah.

The group flew routine tactical airlift missions in the western states.

=== Fighter operations ===
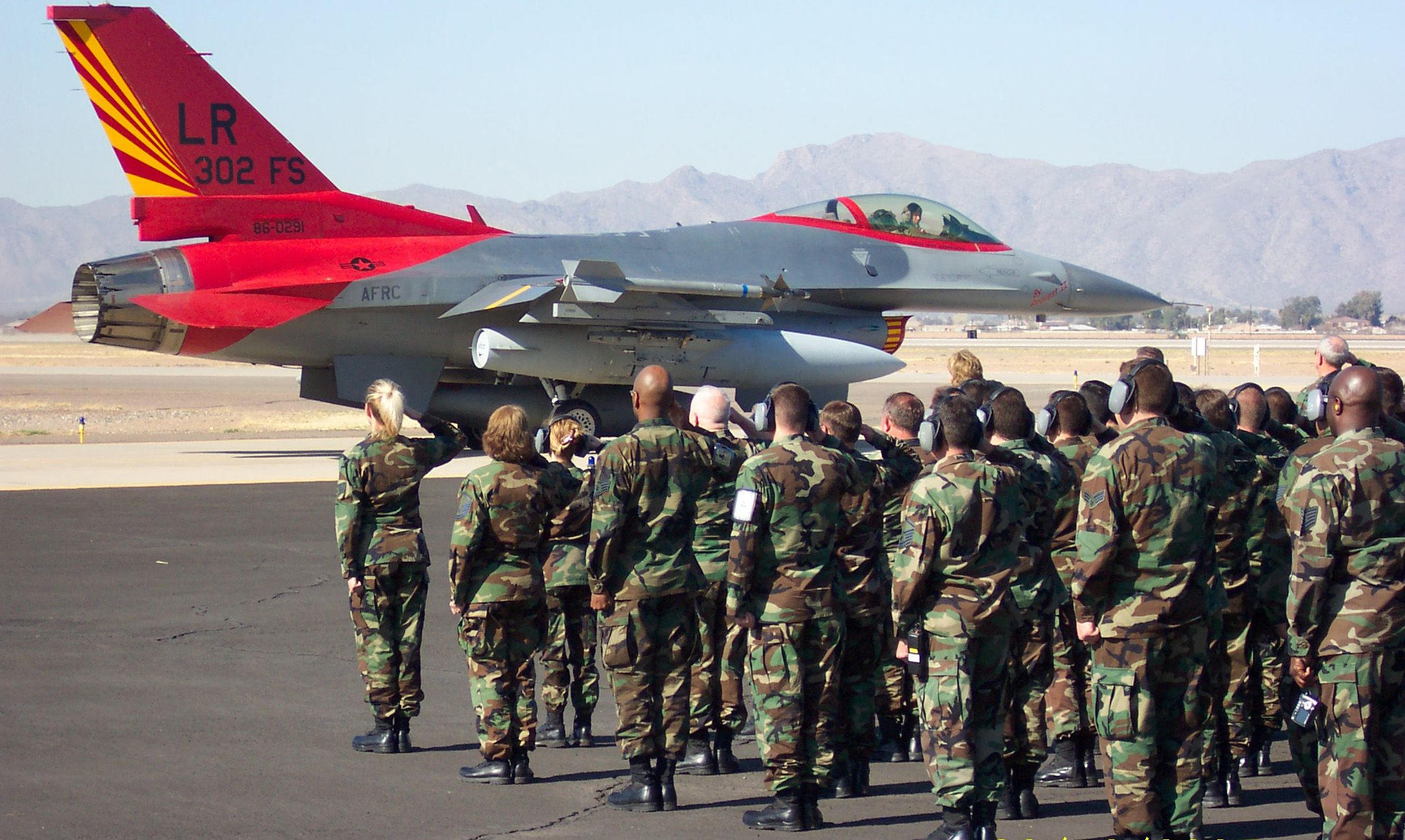
A General Dynamics F-16C Fighting Falcon of the 944th Fighter Wing wearing a special paint scheme and the wing's LR tail code in 2007

The 944th Fighter Wing is one of more than 50 flying units in the U.S. Air Force Reserve. The unit was activated at Luke on 1 July 1987. The wing flies the General Dynamics F-16C Fighting Falcon and F-16D (Block 32 model). The unit is currently funded and manned for fifteen F-16 aircraft flown by the 69th Fighter Squadron.

The 944th Operations Group's 52d Fighter Squadron is an Associate unit embedded in the active duty 56th Fighter Wing's 63d Fighter Squadron at Luke AFB, providing instructor pilots and support personnel for the F-35A Lightning II.

The 944th was the first Air Force Reserve fighter unit to fly operational missions with the coalition task force over Northern Iraq in support of Provide Comfort II in 1992–1993. The unit flew 1,090 hours or 308 sorties with only one sortie lost due to maintenance.

== Lineage ==
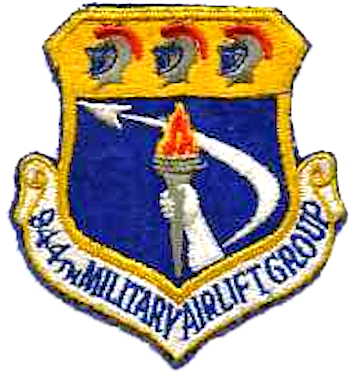
Emblem of the 944th Military Airlift Group

- Established as the 944th Troop Carrier Group, Medium and activated in the Reserve on 28 December 1962 (not organized)

Organized on 17 January 1963
Redesignated 944th Tactical Airlift Group on 1 July 1967
Redesignated 944th Military Airlift Group (Associate) on 25 March 1968
Inactivated on 1 July 1973

- Redesignated 944th Tactical Fighter Group on 12 November 1986

Activated in the Reserve on 1 July 1987
Redesignated 944th Fighter Group on 1 February 1992
Redesignated 944th Fighter Wing on 1 October 1994

=== Assignments ===
- Continental Air Command, 28 December 1962 (not organized)
- 452d Troop Carrier Wing (later 452d Military Airlift Wing), 17 January 1963
- 349th Military Airlift Wing, 25 July 1969 – 1 July 1973
- 419th Tactical Fighter Wing (later 419th Fighter Wing), 1 July 1987
- Tenth Air Force, 1 October 1994 – Present

=== Components ===
- 944th Operations Group: 1 Aug 1992 – present
- 302d Tactical Fighter Squadron: 1 July 1987 – 1 August 1992
- 728th Military Airlift Squadron: 1 January 1972 – 1 July 1973
- 729th Military Airlift Squadron: 25 April 1969 – 1 July 1973
- 730th Troop Carrier Squadron (later 730th Tactical Airlift Squadron, 730th Military Airlift Squadron): 17 January 1963 – 1 July 1973

=== Stations ===
- March Air Force Base, California, 17 January 1963
- Norton Air Force Base, California, 25 March 1968 – 1 July 1973
- Luke Air Force Base, Arizona, 1 July 1987 – Present

=== Aircraft ===
- Fairchild C-119 Flying Boxcar, 1963–1968
- Lockheed C-141 Starlifter, 1968–1973
- General Dynamics F-16 Fighting Falcon, 1987 – present
- Lockheed F-35 Lightning II, 2016–present

== See also ==
- List of wings of the United States Air Force
