= 32nd Air Expeditionary Group =

32d Air Expeditionary Group

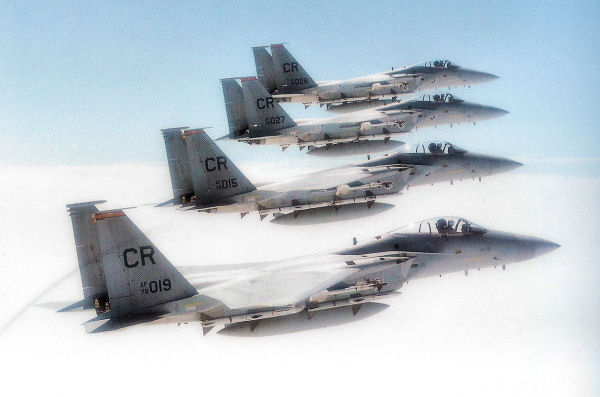
- McDonnell Douglas F-15C Eagles of the 32d Tactical Fighter Group
- Active: 1941–1943; 1948–1949; 1957–1962; 1989–2006
- Country: United States
- Branch: United States Air Force
- Role: Expeditionary Operations
- Part of: United States Air Forces Europe
- Decorations: Air Force Outstanding Unit Award

Commanders
- Notable commanders: Jay B. Silveria

Insignia
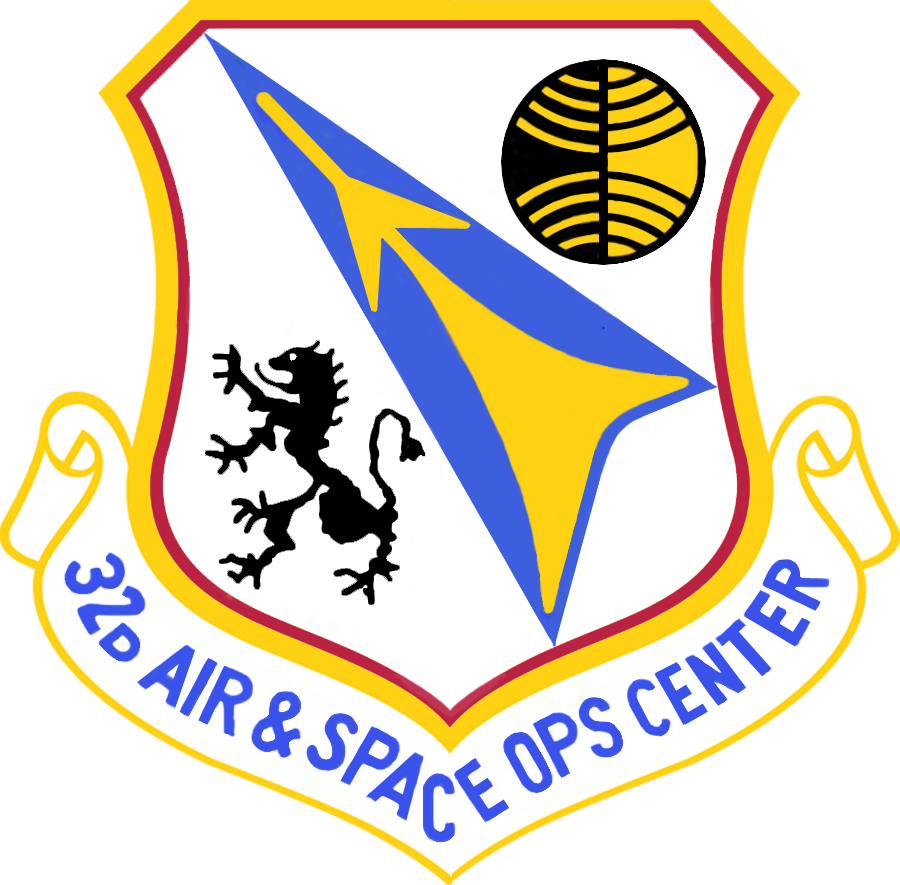
- 32d Air Expeditionary Group emblem (Note: Approved 8 August 1960.)

The 32d Air Expeditionary Group is a provisional unit of the United States Air Force (USAF). It is assigned to United States Air Forces in Europe (USAFE) to activate or inactivate at any time. It was last active as the 32d Air And Space Operations Center in December 2006 at Ramstein Air Base, Germany.

The group was first activated in 1940 at Rio Hato Army Air Base, Panama as the 32d Pursuit Group to provide air defense for the Panama Canal Zone. It continued in this mission until 1943, when the perceived threat of an attack on the Panama Canal decreased and the group, by then the 32d Fighter Group, was disbanded. As Air Defense Command expanded its defenses during the Cold War against possible Soviet attack with units stationed along the northern border of the United States, the group was revived in February 1957 at Minot Air Force Base, North Dakota. As Minot facilities expanded to accommodate Strategic Air Command (SAC) units there, a larger organization was required to manage the station and the group was inactivated and replaced by the 32d Fighter Wing.

The 32d Composite Wing was activated at Kadena Air Base, Okinawa in August 1948 as part of the Air Force's wing base reorganization. The wing conducted reconnaissance missions in the Far East with squadrons attached from other units. It continued its mission for only eight months, then it was inactivated and its personnel were transferred to the newly organized 6332d Station Wing. The 32d Wing was redesignated the 32d Fighter Wing and replaced the group in February 1961 as the host organization at Minot Air Force Base. However, it soon became apparent that Minot's support for the increasing SAC presence there called for the transfer of host responsibility to SAC and the wing was discontinued in July 1962. The wing was briefly active in 1964 as the 32d Tactical Fighter Wing at George Air Force Base, California in 1964, but was soon inactivated when the 8th Tactical Fighter Wing transferred on paper from Pacific Air Forces to Tactical Air Command and took over its role at George.

In 1984, the group and wing were consolidated into a single unit. As the 32d Tactical Fighter Group, the consolidated unit was activated at Soesterberg Air Base, Netherlands, where its 32d Tactical Fighter Squadron had been active since 1955. It served as a fighter group at Soesterberg until 1994, when USAFE reduced its fighter forces at the end of the Cold War. It moved to Ramstein Air Base, Germany and became the air and space operations center for USAFE as the 32d Air Operations Group. It served in this role until 2006, when its personnel and equipment were transferred to the new 603d Air and Space Operations Center.

The group was converted to provisional status in early 2011 as the 32d Air Expeditionary Group and assigned to USAFE to activate and inactivate as needed for contingency operations.

== Mission ==
When activated by the Commander, United States Air Forces Europe, the group mission is to command expeditionary units as directed.

== History ==
=== World War II ===
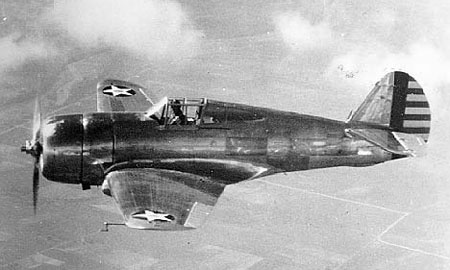
Curtiss P-36 as flown by the 15th Pursuit Group

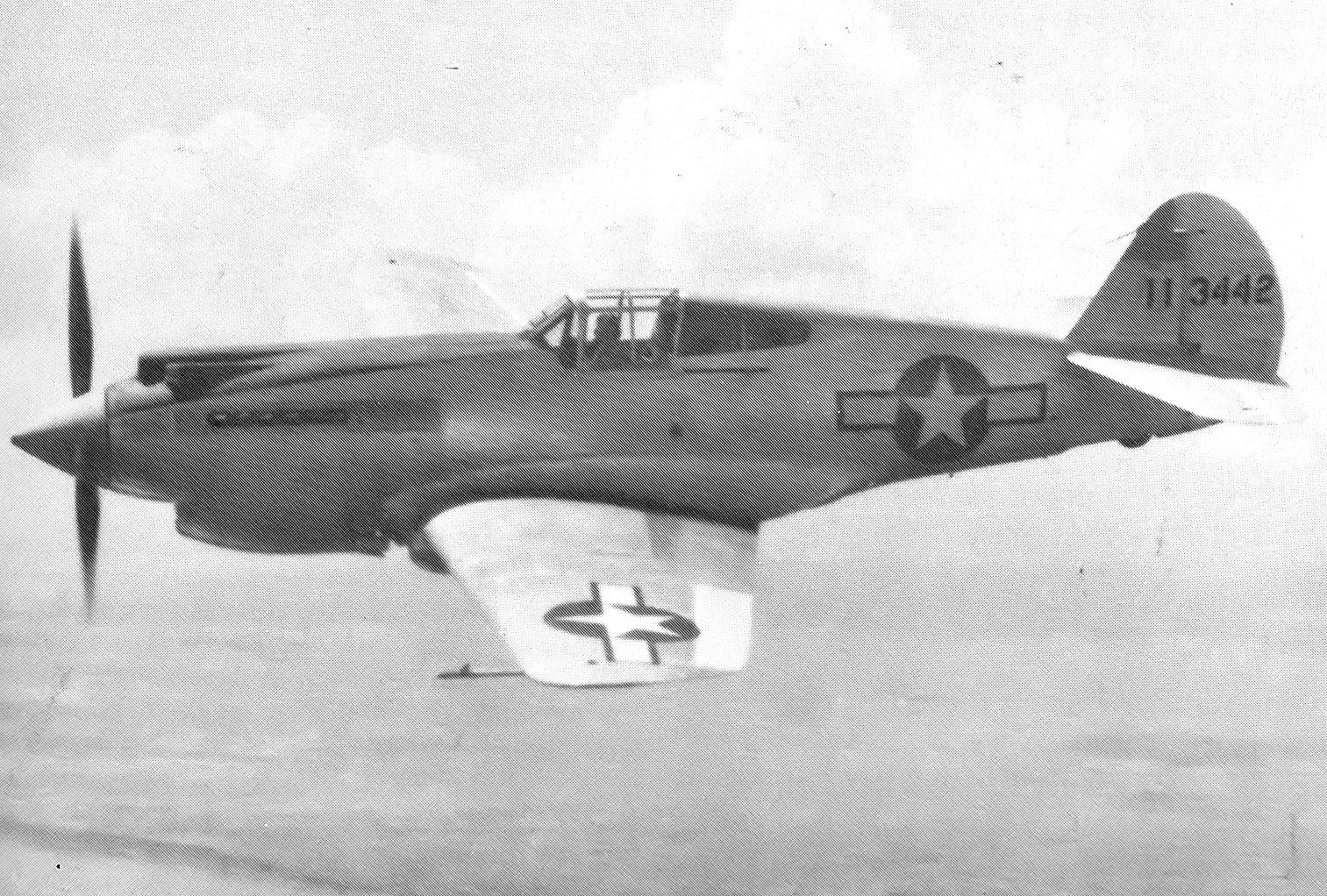
51st Fighter Squadron P-40C

The United States Army constituted the 32nd Pursuit Group in late 1940. Shortly afterwards, on 1 January 1941, the Panama Canal Air Force activated the group at Rio Hato Army Air Base, Panama. For the most part, however, the group consisted only of cadres provided by other units in the Canal Zone. Although headquarters were at Rio Hato, as a tactical organization it was located at Albrook Field, where all pursuit organizations in the Panama Canal Zone were concentrated, and its squadrons had only an average of 4 to 6 officers assigned. The group and its three assigned flying squadrons, the 51st, 52d, and 53d Pursuit Squadrons, had the mission of protecting the Panama Canal using obsolete Boeing P-26 Peashooters. On 9 December 1941, just after Pearl Harbor, the newly redesignated Caribbean Air Force moved the unit to France Field in the Canal Zone. The Air Corps soon equipped the 32nd Pursuit Group with Curtiss P-36 Hawks to strengthen the defenses of the region.

On 15 May 1942, the unit was redesignated as the 32nd Fighter Group and provided it with Lockheed P-38 Lightnings. However, the group soon swapped these fighters for Curtiss P-40 Warhawks. From 1941 to 1943 the group trained in flying intercept and fighter sweeps over the area surrounding the Canal Zone. However, as the perceived threat to the Canal Zone diminished, the group disbanded at France Field on 1 November 1943.

=== Reconnaissance in the Far East ===
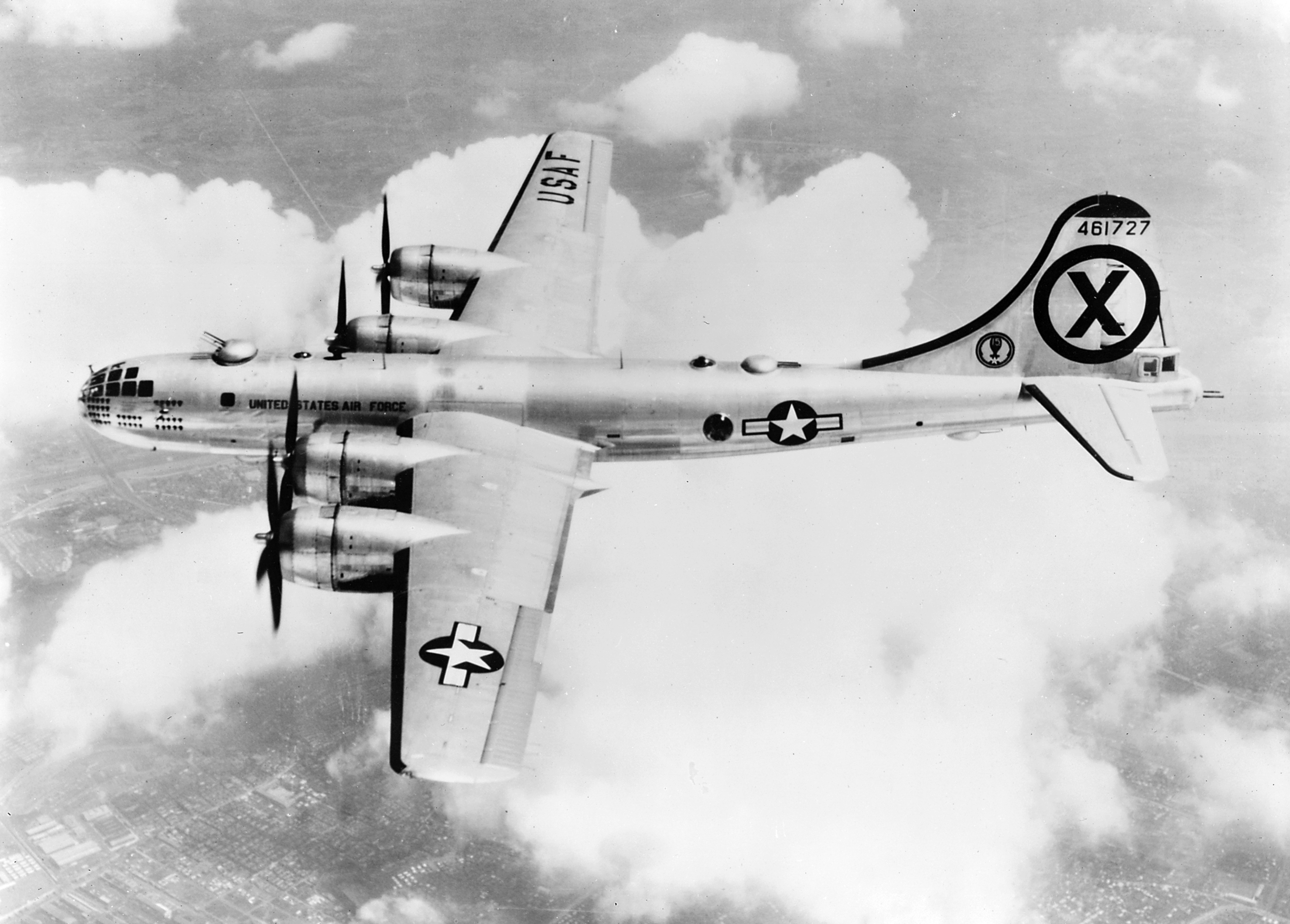
RB-29 similar to planes of 23d and 31st Reconnaissance Squadrons

In August 1948, the United States Air Force (USAF) established the 32nd Composite Wing, which was activated by Far East Air Forces the same month at Kadena Field, Okinawa as part of the implementation of the Wing Base reorganization of the USAF, replacing the 316th Bombardment Wing and various support elements. In October, the wing also replaced the 71st Tactical Reconnaissance Wing, which had become a paper unit attached to the wing. The wing had no operational group, but the 23d Reconnaissance Squadron of the 5th Reconnaissance Group and the 31st Reconnaissance Squadrons of the 71st Tactical Reconnaissance Group, both very long range photographic reconnaissance units, were attached to the wing for operations. The wing mission was to provide the Thirteenth Air Force with photographic air reconnaissance and search and rescue support. The wing, along with its 23d and 31st Reconnaissance Squadrons, used Boeing B/FB-17 Flying Fortresses, Boeing RB-29 Superfortresses, and Curtiss C-46 Commandos to accomplish this mission until the Air Force inactivated the wing in 1949 and replaced it as the host wing at Kadena with the 6332nd Station Wing

=== Air Defense of the United States ===
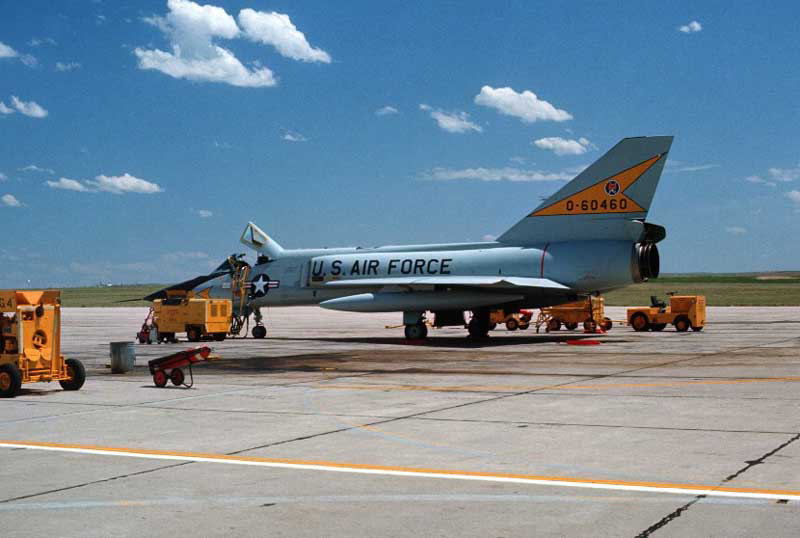
Convair F-106A Delta Dart of the 5th Fighter Interceptor Squadron at Minot AFB (Note: Today, the F-106 in the image is on static display at Minot.)

At the end of 1956, USAF reconstituted the 32d Fighter Group as the 32d Fighter Group (Air Defense), subsequently activating it at Minot Air Force Base, North Dakota as part of Air Defense Command (ADC) on 8 February 1957. The group assumed USAF host responsibilities for the base and was assigned a medical unit and three support squadrons to perform these duties. On 1 April 1959, the 32d was reassigned from the 29th Air Division to the Minot Air Defense Sector, which was activated at Minot. In November, the 433d Fighter-Interceptor Squadron (FIS) moved to Minot from Ladd Air Force Base, Alaska, but the squadron was a paper unit, without aircraft or personnel. It was not until 1960 that the first truly operational unit, the 5th FIS, arrived at Minot, was assigned to the Group, and began to train to become operational with Convair F-106 Delta Darts.

By 1960 the first elements of Strategic Air Command (SAC)'s 4136th Strategic Wing had activated at Minot. The 32d managed the rapid expansion of facilities to support both ADC and SAC at Minot By 1961, however, Minot had become a larger facility than could be managed by a group. The first Boeing B-52 Stratofortresses of the 4136's 525th Bombardment Squadron were arriving at Minot, and the expansion of the base required a full wing to operate it.

As a result, the 32d Fighter Group was discontinued on 1 February 1961, and USAF organized the 32d Wing, now redesignated the 32d Fighter Wing (Air Defense), at Minot in 1961 to replace it. The 5th FIS and some of the 32d Group support organizations were reassigned to the wing or its newly activated 32d Air Base Group.

Although the number of ADC interceptor squadrons remained almost constant in the early 1960s, attrition (and the fact that production lines closed in 1961) caused a gradual drop in the number of planes assigned to a squadron, from 24 to typically 18 by 1964. These reductions made it apparent that the primary mission of Minot would be to support SAC and resulted in the inactivation of the wing and the transfer of Minot to SAC in 1962. When USAF transferred the base to SAC, it discontinued the wing and its support elements, while the 5th FIS was reassigned to Minot Air Defense Sector.

=== Tactical Fighters ===
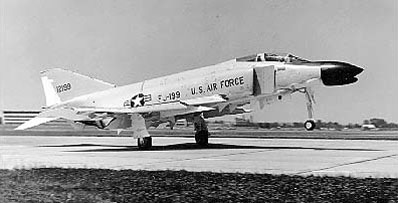
F-4C as flown by the 32d Tactical Fighter Wing

In April 1964, Tactical Air Command activated the wing as the 32d Tactical Fighter Wing at George Air Force Base, California, to be equipped with F-4C Phantom IIs. The wing had four assigned tactical fighter squadrons, the 782nd, 783d, 784th, and 785th. But, before the wing became fully equipped and trained with the new fighter aircraft, the Air Force replaced the wing with the 8th Tactical Fighter Wing, which returned to the US from Japan in July. In anticipation of this replacement, three fighter-interceptor squadrons, the 68th, 431st, and 497th, were transferred to the 32d shortly before its inactivation. These squadrons were redesignated as tactical fighter squadrons and transferred to the 8th Tactical Fighter Wing when the 32d was inactivated, while the 32d's original four squadrons inactivated with the wing.

=== NATO Support in Europe ===
In 1989, the Netherlands government allowed United States Air Forces in Europe to expand the Air Force squadron at Soesterberg Air Base (Note: The American portion of this Dutch base was called Camp New Amsterdam. Fletcher, p. 19.)to group status. Thus, in late 1989 USAFE activated the recently redesignated 32d Tactical Fighter Group at Soesterberg. The group took command of the 32d Tactical Fighter Squadron, along with eight support squadrons, a medical clinic, and an explosive ordnance disposal (EOD) flight. After United States Senate ratification of the Intermediate Nuclear Forces Reduction Treaty, the group supported the Soviet verification team inspecting the reductions at nearby Woensdrecht Air Base. In 1990, the group supported Desert Storm both at its home base and at deployed locations. Following the war, the group deployed personnel and equipment to Incirlik Air Base, Turkey to support operations Proven Force and Provide Comfort, to support humanitarian efforts for refugees.

In November 1991, the group was reorganized on a downsized model of the USAF Objective Wing as the 32d Fighter Group, losing two squadrons and the EOD flight, while most of its support squadrons were reduced to flights and reassigned to its support or logistics squadrons. With the end of the Cold War a major force draw-down occurred in Europe and USAF reduced its fighter force structure. As a result, in July 1994, the 32d Tactical Fighter Group Moved to Ramstein Air Base and assumed a new mission. It was replaced as USAF host unit at Soesterberg by the 632d Air Base Squadron. Its McDonnell Douglas F-15 Eagle aircraft were returned to the United States.

Upon arrival at Ramstein, USAF redesignated the unit as the 32d Air Operations Group, as part of the USAFE Theater Air and Space Operations Center at Kapaun Air Station, Germany. Serving as the USAFE Theater Air and Space Operations Center, the 32d functioned to consolidate operational command and control of forces. It was the senior USAFE node for command and control of air, space, and cyberspace forces. When employed for joint or coalition operations, it was known as a joint or combined air operations center for coalition operations. The 32d was the organization that largely planned and provided the operational execution of Operation Allied Force, the North Atlantic Treaty Organization bombing of Yugoslavia.

The 32d was inactivated on 1 December 2006 and replaced by the Third Air Force's 603d Air Operation Center.

== Lineage ==
32d Fighter Group

- Constituted as the 32d Pursuit Group (Fighter) on 22 November 1940

Activated on 1 January 1941
Redesignated as 32d Fighter Group (Twin Engine) on 15 May 1942
Redesignated as 32d Fighter Group (Single Engine) on 28 September 1942
Disbanded on 1 November 1943

- Reconstituted and redesignated as 32d Fighter Group (Air Defense) on 11 December 1956

Activated on 8 February 1957
Discontinued and inactivated on 1 February 1961

- Consolidated with 32d Tactical Fighter Wing on 31 January 1984 as 32d Tactical Fighter Wing

Wing

- Constituted as the 32d Composite Wing on 10 August 1948

Activated on 24 August 1948
Inactivated on 1 April 1949
Redesignated as 32d Fighter-Bomber Wing on 23 March 1953 (not active)
Redesignated as 32d Fighter Wing (Air Defense) and activated on 28 December 1960
Organized on 1 February 1961
Discontinued and inactivated on 1 July 1962

- Organized on 1 April 1964 prior to activation

Redesignated as 32d Tactical Fighter Wing and activated on 6 April 1964
Inactivated on 25 July 1964

- Consolidated with 32d Fighter Group (Air Defense) on 31 January 1984

Consolidated Unit

- Redesignated 32d Tactical Fighter Group on 1 November 1989

Activated on 16 November 1989
Redesignated 32d Fighter Group on 30 November 1991
Redesignated as 32d Air Operations Group on 1 July 1994
Redesignated as 32d Air and Space Operations Center on 1 November 2005
Inactivated on 1 December 2006

- Redesignated as 32d Air Expeditionary Group and converted to provisional status on 8 March 2011

=== Assignments ===
12th Pursuit Wing 1 January 1941
26th Interceptor Command (later XXVI Interceptor Command, XXVI Fighter Command), 18 September 1942 – 1 November 1943
29th Air Division, 8 February 1957
Minot Air Defense Sector, 1 August 1960 – 1 February 1961
1st Air Division, 24 August 1948
Thirteenth Air Force, 1 December 1948 – 1 April 1949
Minot Air Defense Sector, 1 February 1961 – 1 July 1962
831st Air Division, 1 April 1964 – 23 July 1964
Seventeenth Air Force, 16 November 1989
United States Air Forces in Europe, 1 July 1994
USAFE Aerospace Operations Support Center (later USAFE Air & Space Operations Center) 1 October 2001
Sixteenth Air Force, 1 November 2005 – 1 December 2006
United States Air Forces in Europe to activate or inactivate at any time, 8 March 2011

=== Stations ===
Rio Hato Army Air Base, Panama, 1 January 1941
France Field, Canal Zone, 9 December 1941 – 1 November 1943
Minot Air Force Base, North Dakota, 8 February 1957 – 1 February 1961
Kadena Air Base, Okinawa, 24 August 1948 – 1 April 1949
Minot Air Force Base, North Dakota, 1 February 1961 – 1 July 1962
George Air Force Base, California, 1 April 1964 – 23 July 1964
Soesterberg Air Base, Netherlands, 16 November 1989
Ramstein Air Base, Germany, 1 July 1994 – 1 December 2006

=== Component Units ===
Wing

- 71st Tactical Reconnaissance Wing, (attached 24 August 1948 – 25 October 1948 – not operational)

Groups

- 32d Air Base Group, 24 August 1948 – 1 April 1949, 1 February 1961 – 1 July 1962
- 32d Maintenance & Supply Group, 24 August 1948 – 1 April 1949
- 32d Station Medical Group (later 32d Medical Group, 32d USAF Dispensary, 32d USAF Hospital), 24 August 1948 – 1 April 1949, 18 January 1958 – 1 July 1962

Operational Squadrons

- 2d Rescue Squadron, 24 August 1948 – 1 April 1949
- 5th Fighter-Interceptor Squadron, 1 February 1960 – 1 July 1962
- 23d Reconnaissance Squadron, (attached 24 August 1948 – 1 April 1949)
- 31st Reconnaissance Squadron, (attached 24 August 1948 – 1 April 1949)
- 32d Tactical Fighter Squadron (later 32d Fighter Squadron, 32d Air Operations Squadron), 16 November 1989 – 1 November 2005
- 51st Pursuit Squadron (later 51st Fighter Squadron), 1 January 1941 – 1 November 1943
- 52d Pursuit Squadron (later 52d Fighter Squadron), 1 January 1941 – 1 November 1943
- 53d Pursuit Squadron (later 53d Fighter Squadron), 1 January 1941 – 1 November 1943

68th Fighter-Interceptor Squadron, 16 June 1964 – 25 July 1964
431st Fighter-Interceptor Squadron, 18 May 1964 – 25 July 1964
433d Fighter-Interceptor Squadron, 1 November 1957 – 8 January 1958
497th Fighter-Interceptor Squadron, 18 June – 25 July 1964
782d Tactical Fighter Squadron, 1 April – 25 July 1964
783d Tactical Fighter Squadron, 1 April – 25 July 1964
784th Tactical Fighter Squadron, 1 April – 25 July 1964
785th Tactical Fighter Squadron, 1 April – 25 July 1964

Support Squadrons

1st Combat Communications Squadron, 1 July 1994 – 1 May 2003
32d Air Base Squadron (later 32d Combat Support Squadron, 32 Support Squadron), 8 February 1957 – 1 February 1961, 16 November 1989 – 1 July 1994
32d Air Intelligence Squadron, 1 July 1994 – 1 November 2005
32d Armament & Electronics Maintenance Squadron (later 32d Component Repair Squadron), 6 April 1964 – 25 July 1964, 16 November 1989 – 31 March 1992
32d Consolidated Aircraft Maintenance Squadron (later 32d Field Maintenance Squadron, 32d Equipment Maintenance Squadron), 1 May 1959 – 1 February 1961, 1 February 1961 – 1 July 1962 6 April 1964 – 25 July 1964, 16 November 1989 – 31 March 1992
32d Materiel Squadron (later 32d Logistics Squadron), 8 February 1957 – 1 February 1961, 31 March 1992 – 1 July 1994
32d Mission Support Squadron, 16 November 1989 – 31 March 1992

32d Operations Support Squadron (later 32d Operations Support Flight), 31 March 1992 – 1 July 1994
32d Organizational Maintenance Squadron (later 32d Aircraft Generation Squadron), 6 April 1964 – 25 July 1964, 16 November 1989 – 31 March 1992
32d Security Police Squadron, 16 November 1989 – 31 March 1992
32d Supply Squadron, 16 November 1989 – 31 March 1992
32d Transportation Squadron, 1 February 1960 – 1 February 1961, 16 November 1989 – 31 March 1992
332d Munitions Maintenance Squadron, 6 April 1964 – 25 July 1964
1992d Communications Squadron (later 32d Communications Squadron), 1 September 1990 – 31 March 1992

Flight (Note: See also squadrons redesignated as flights.)

32d Explosive Ordnance Disposal Flight, 31 March 1992 – 30 November 1991

Other

- USAF Clinic, Camp New Amsterdam (later 32d Tactical Fighter Group Clinic, 32d Fighter Group Clinic, 32d Medical Squadron), 16 November 1989 – 1 July 1994

=== Aircraft ===
- Boeing P-26 Peashooter, 1941–1942
- Curtiss P-36 Hawk, 1942
- P-38 Lightning, 1942
- P-40 Warhawk, 1942–1943
- B/FB-17 Flying Fortress, 1948–1949
- RB-29 Superfortress, 1948–1949
- C-46 Commando, 1948–1949
- F-106 Delta Dart, 1957–1962
- F-4C Phantom II, 1964
- F-15 Eagle, 1989–1994

=== Awards and campaigns ===
Award streamer	Award	Dates	Notes
	Air Force Outstanding Unit Award	1 July 1990 – 30 June 1991	32d Tactical Fighter Group
	Air Force Outstanding Unit Award	30 September 1992 – 29 September 1994	32d Fighter Group
	Air Force Outstanding Unit Award	1 June 1994 – 1 June 1996	32d Air Operations Group
	Air Force Outstanding Unit Award	1 September 1997 – 31 August 1999	32d Air Operations Group
	Air Force Outstanding Unit Award	1 October 1998 – 30 June 2000	32d Air Operations Group
	Air Force Outstanding Unit Award	30 June 2000 – 31 May 2002	32d Air Operations Group
	Air Force Outstanding Unit Award	1 June 2002 – 30 November 2003	32d Air Operations Group
	Air Force Outstanding Unit Award	1 January 2006 – 30 June 2006	32d Air and Space Operations Center

Campaign Streamer	Campaign	Dates	Notes
	American Theater without inscription	7 December 1941 – 1 November 1943	32d Fighter Group

== See also ==
- List of United States Air Force Aerospace Defense Command Interceptor Squadrons
