= Luke Air Force Base =

US Air Force base in Arizona

- Glendale, Arizona in the United States of America
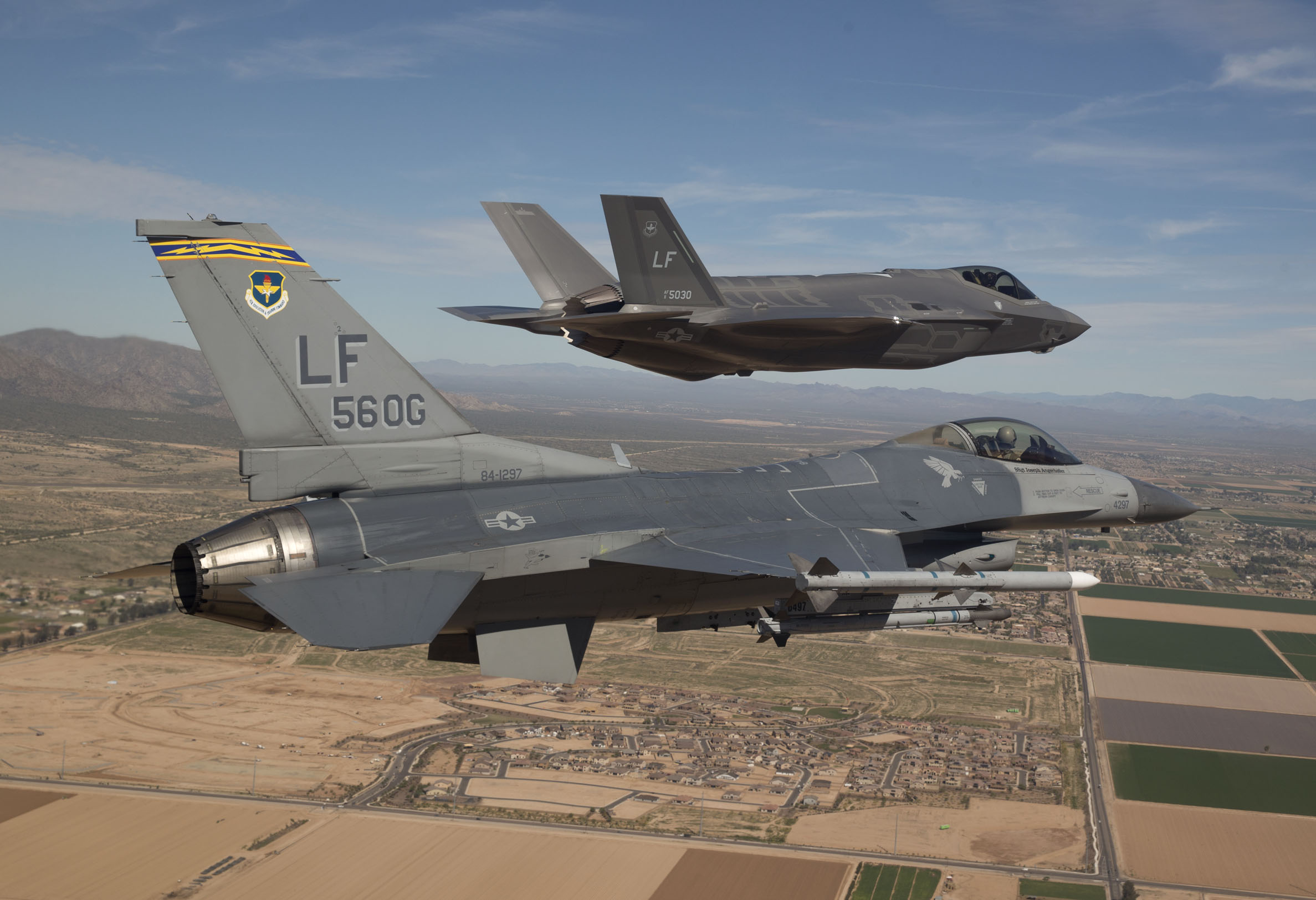
- The 56th Operations Group flagship F-16 Fighting Falcon (84-1297) welcomes Luke Air Force Base's first F-35 Lightning II (11-5030) to the base on 10 March 2014.

Site information
- Type: US Air Force base
- Owner: Department of Defense
- Operator: US Air Force
- Controlled by: Air Combat Command (ACC)
- Website: www.luke.af.mil

Location
- Location within North America Location within the United States Location within Arizona Location within Maricopa County, Arizona
- Coordinates: 33°32′06″N 112°22′59″W

Site history
- Built: 1941 (as Luke Field)
- Built by: Del E. Webb Construction Company
- In use: 1941 – present

Garrison information
- Garrison: 56th Fighter Wing (host); 944th Fighter Wing

Airfield information
- Identifiers: IATA: LUF, ICAO: KLUF, FAA LID: LUF, WMO: 722785
- Elevation: 331 m (1,085 ft) AMSL
Runways
Direction	Length and surface
03L/21R	3,052 m (10,012 ft) asphalt
03R/21L	3,019 m (9,904 ft) concrete

Luke Air Force Base (IATA: LUF, ICAO: KLUF, FAA LID: LUF) is a United States Air Force base in Maricopa County, Arizona, United States. It is located 7 miles (6.1 nmi; 11 km) west of the central business district of Glendale, and 15 miles (13 nmi; 24 km) west of Phoenix. The majority of Luke AFB is in the Glendale city limits.

Luke AFB is a major training base of the Air Combat Command (ACC), training pilots in the F-16 Fighting Falcon. On 31 March 2011, the F-35 Lightning II was announced to be replacing the F-16 as the primary training aircraft at Luke, although the date of deployment of the new aircraft to Luke and reorganization plans were not announced. On 16 July 2013, the Air Force announced that Luke AFB will house a total of 144 F-35A Lightning IIs. The first F-35A Lightning II arrived to the base on March 10, 2014.

It is a designated superfund site due to a number of soil and groundwater contaminants.

== History ==
=== Frank Luke Jr. ===
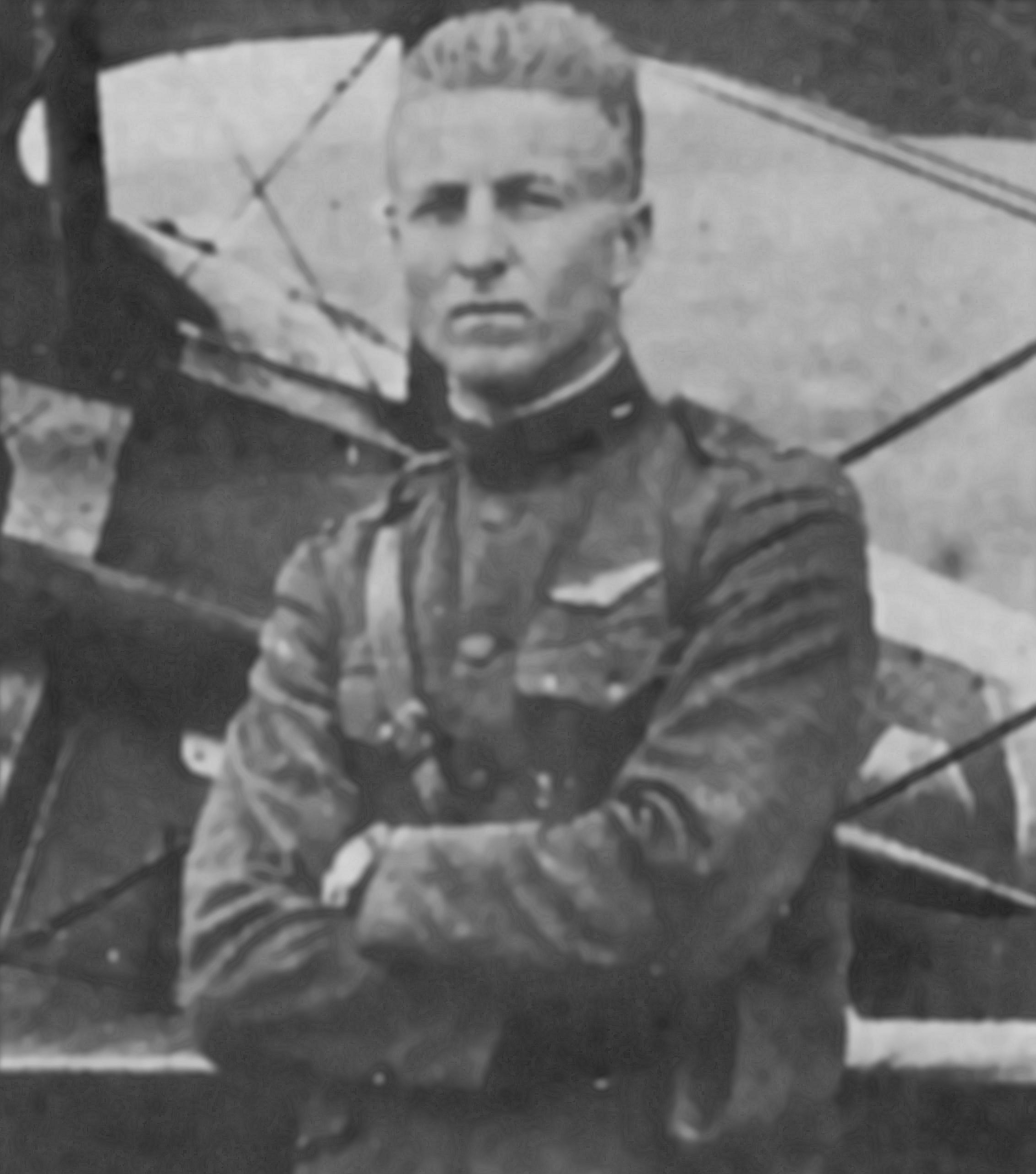
Second Lieutenant Frank Luke Jr.

Luke Air Force Base was named after Second Lieutenant Frank Luke (1897–1918). Lt Luke is a posthumous Medal of Honor recipient and the number-two United States flying ace in World War I.

Born in Phoenix in 1897, the "Arizona Balloon Buster" scored 18 aerial victories during World War I (14 of these German observation balloons) in the skies over France. Lieutenant Luke was shot down at Murvaux between Verdun and Stenay, France, on 29 September 1918, after he had destroyed three enemy balloons. Surviving the crash of his SPAD S.XIII, Lieutenant Luke drew two pistols and fired on German soldiers, killing several of them before he was killed.

Luke Field, Oahu, Hawaii Territory (now the Naval Air Station Ford Island), was previously named in his honor.

=== Origins ===
In 1940, the U.S. Army sent a representative to Arizona to choose a site for a U.S. Army Air Corps training field for advanced training in conventional fighter aircraft. The city of Phoenix bought 1,440 acres (5.8 km^{2}) of land, which they leased to the government at $1 a year effective 24 March 1941. On 29 March 1941, the Del. E. Webb Construction Co. began excavation for the first building at what was known then as Litchfield Park Air Base. Another base known as Luke Field, in Pearl Harbor, Hawaii, released its name so the Arizona base could be called Luke Field. Advanced flight training in the AT-6 Texan began at Luke in June that same year. The first class of 45 students, Class 41 F, arrived on 6 June 1941 to begin advanced flight training in the AT-6, although a few essential buildings had been completed. Flying out of Sky Harbor Airport until the Luke runways were ready, pilots received 10 weeks of instruction and the first class graduated 15 August 1941. Then-captain Barry Goldwater served as director of ground training the following year.

=== World War II ===
Luke Field 1943 classbook

During World War II, Luke Field was the largest fighter training base in the U.S. Army Air Forces, graduating more than 12,000 fighter pilots from advanced and operational courses earning the nickname "Home of the Fighter Pilot".

The base was under the control of the 37th Flying Training Wing (Advanced Single-Engine), Western Flying Training Command, AAF Flying Training Command. During the years of World War II, more than 17,000 pilots trained at Luke Field, making it the largest single-engine advanced flying training school in the U.S. More than a million hours of flying were logged, primarily in the AT-6 Texan, along with some transitioning to P-40 Warhawk fighters and later the P-51 Mustang and P-47 Thunderbolt.

Although continually modified during the war years, the course of advanced flight training at Luke averaged about 10 weeks and included both flight training and ground school. Around 60 hours of flying instruction covered formation flying, navigation, and instrument flying, as well as a bit of aerial acrobatics. About 20 additional hours of flight practice concentrated on aerial and gunnery training.

Ground school, or classroom training for the advanced flying course, varied from about 100 to 130 hours and was intermingled with flight time in the aircraft. Cadets flew in the morning and attended ground school in the afternoons, or flew training missions in the afternoon after a morning of ground school. At the peak of the training program at Luke, some students were required to attend night classes. Ground school included instruction in navigation, flight planning, radio equipment, maintenance, and weather.

By 7 February 1944, pilots at Luke had achieved a million hours of flying time. By 1946, however, the number of pilots trained dropped to 299 and the base was deactivated 30 November that year.

A World War II film, A Guy Named Joe, included some footage filmed at Luke.

=== United States Air Force ===
==== Air Training Command ====
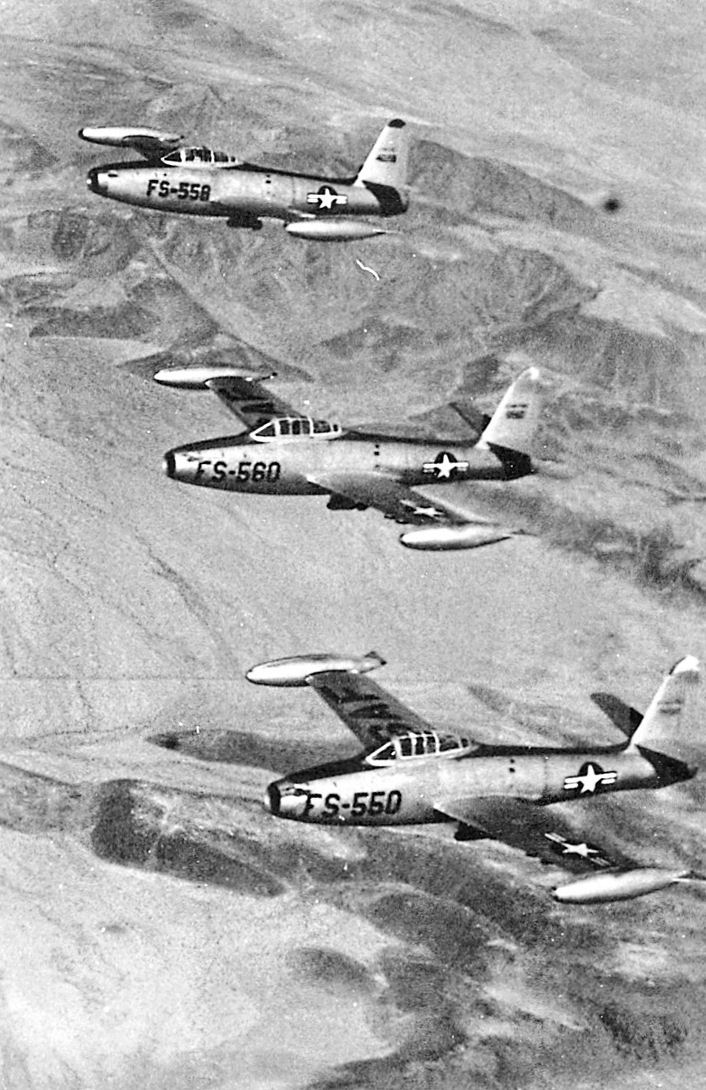
Three F-84Cs from the 3600th Flying Training Wing, flying over the Arizona desert

Soon after combat started in Korea, Luke field was reactivated on 1 February 1951 as Luke Air Force Base, part of the Air Training Command (ATC) under the reorganized United States Air Force (USAF). A steady pipeline of trained bomber-escort pilots was needed by Strategic Air Command (SAC), and the mission of Luke AFB was to augment the jet fighter combat crew training in operation at Nellis AFB. The school at Luke was designated by ATC as the USAF Air Crew School (Fighter Bomber/Escort).

The program was to be conducted by the Federalized Michigan Air National Guard 127th Fighter Group, which had transferred from Continental Air Command to ATC, effective 10 February. The wing moved from Romulus Airport, Michigan, to Luke on 23 February, and on 1 March ATC established the USAF Air Crew School (Fighter-Bomber/Escort) at Luke. Fighter-bomber training began on 1 March 1951 in the P-51 Mustang, being replaced by early-model F-84C Thunderjets.

Effective 5 March, the 127th was redesignated as the 127th Pilot Training Wing. On 1 November 1952, the active-duty 3600th Flying Training Wing (Fighter), under Commander Charles F. Born, replaced the Air National Guardsmen. ATC flying training squadrons at Luke included:

- 3601st Fighter Interceptor (later Combat Crew Training) Squadron, 1 November 1952 – 31 December 1957
- 3602d Fighter Interceptor (later Combat Crew Training) Squadron, 20 November 1952 – 31 December 1957
- 3603d Fighter Interceptor (later Combat Crew Training) Squadron, 20 November 1952 – 31 December 1957
- 3604th Fighter Interceptor (later Combat Crew Training) Squadron, 20 November 1952 – 31 December 1957

The 3600th FTW became the dedicated training organization for both USAF and NATO pilots in the F-84. The F-84D began having electrical problems with the hot, dry Arizona air, which dried out the aircraft's electrical insulation. They were replaced by F-84E, and shortly afterwards to the F-84G, which was then in use by SAC. In October 1954, ATC redesignated the 3600th as a "Combat Crew Training Wing" to describe its mission better.

In January 1954, the swept-wing F-84F Thunderstreak began to arrive, and three additional dedicated squadrons were activated:

- 3605th Fighter Interceptor (later Combat Crew Training) Squadron, 12 May 1954 – 31 December 1957
- 3606th Fighter Interceptor (later Combat Crew Training) Squadron, 12 May – 13 October 1954

Redesignated 3607th Combat Crew Training Squadron, 20 October 1954 – 10 June 1957

- 3608th Fighter Interceptor (later Combat Crew Training) Squadron, 12 May 1954 – 31 December 1957

F-84Fs replaced the straight-winged earlier models in the original four squadrons by the end of 1956, giving the wing seven squadrons of 21 aircraft each, or about 150 aircraft; 30 more were received in 1957 as some of the older production blocks were transferred to Air National Guard units or to reclamation at Davis-Monthan AFB.

For several years, the Armed Forces Special Weapons Project at Sandia Base, New Mexico, had provided all atomic, biological, and chemical (ABC) warfare training for the USAF. Beginning in October 1954, ATC added ABC instruction to its fighter-pilot programs at Luke and Nellis. In addition, ATC established six general ABC courses to train aircrews already in the field, using mobile training teams.

===== Formation of the USAF Thunderbirds =====
On 25 May 1953 the 3600th Air Demonstration Team was officially organized and established at Luke, still officially carrying this designation, now known as the United States Air Force Thunderbirds. At Luke, the squadron initially operated F-84G Thunderjets, as the aircraft had to be able to show how good training made a typical aircraft easy to handle. The aircraft had to be stable for maneuvers in formation, reliable enough to meet show schedules, and rugged for the demonstration team. In addition, the F-84G was the first fighter in the USAF with aerial refueling capability. To convert the aircraft from combat to demonstration, technicians removed the guns and plugged the gun ports.

In 1955, the USAF selected the swept-wing F-84F Thunderstreak as their second aircraft. The Thunderstreak was modified for the team by adding smoke tanks for the first time, and red, white, and blue drag chutes. In addition, the extreme heat from the lead aircraft, 1,500 °F (820 °C), required moving the slot's radio antenna from the jet's fin. For the first time, a solo was added to the diamond displays, increasing the show time to 19 minutes.

The unit was reassigned to Nellis AFB, Nevada on 23 June 1956.

==== Tactical Air Command ====
===== 4510th Combat Crew Training Wing =====
====== F-100 Super Sabre era ======
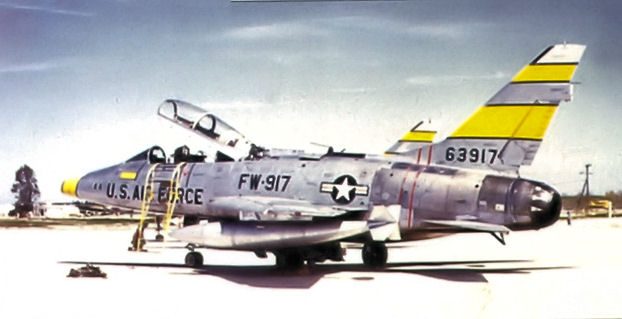
4514th CCTS North American F-100F-10-NA Super Sabre 56–3917, about 1962. To MASDC 31 July 1979 as FE0567. Converted to QF-100F.

By the end of 1957, ATC basing structure had changed considerably as the result of tactical commitments, decreased student load, and fund shortages. During 1958, ATC discontinued its Flying Training and Technical Training Air Force. As a result, Luke AFB was transferred to Tactical Air Command (TAC). This reassignment came about as the result of a USAF-directed study of the feasibility of putting combat crew training under the appropriate zone of interior operational commands.

With the transfer to TAC, the ATC 3600th FTW was redesignated as the 4510th Combat Crew Training Wing, and flying training at Luke was changed to the F-100 Super Sabre. F-100 training squadrons were:

- 4511th Combat Crew Training Squadron, 1 January 1958 – 1 October 1964 (formerly ATC 3601st CCTW)
- 4512th Combat Crew Training Squadron, 1 January 1958 – 15 October 1969 (formerly ATC 3602d CCTW)
- 4513th Combat Crew Training Squadron, 1 January – 1 November 1958 (formerly ATC 3603d CCTW)
- 4514th Combat Crew Training Squadron, 1 January 1958 – 15 December 1969 (formerly ATC 3604th CCTW)
- 4515th Combat Crew Training Squadron, 1 January 1958 – 18 January 1970 (formerly ATC 3605th CCTW)
- 4516th Combat Crew Training Squadron, 1 January 1958 – 1 April 1970 (formerly ATC 3608th CCTW)

During the 1960s, thousands of American fighter pilots left Luke to fly missions in the skies over Vietnam in the F-100. In July 1968, the first "LA" tail codes were placed on the tails of Luke-based aircraft.

===== 58th Tactical Fighter Training Wing =====
====== F-4 Phantom II era ======
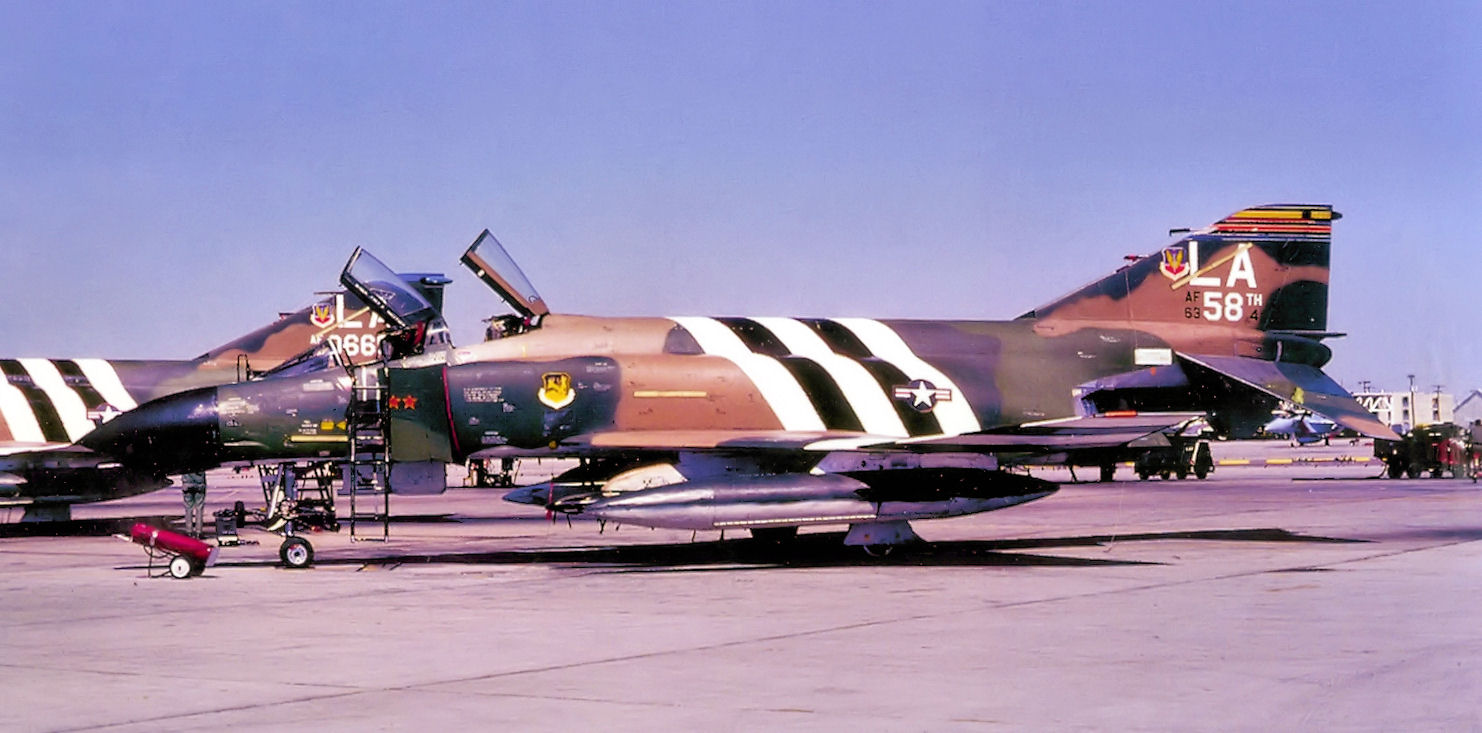
This 311th TFTS F-4C-19-MC Phantom 63–7584, marked as the wing commander's aircraft, is now at McChord Air Museum, Washington.

The 58th Tactical Fighter Training Wing replaced the provisional 4510th CCTW on 15 October 1969. Although Luke remained under the jurisdiction of TAC, the HQ USAF-controlled (AFCON) 58th TFTW gave the wing at Luke a permanent lineage and history that the TAC provisional wing could not carry.

The provisional squadrons of the 4510th were redesignated as:

- 310th Tactical Fighter Training Squadron (formerly 4514th CCTS)
- 311th Tactical Fighter Training Squadron (formerly 4515th CCTS)
- 425th Tactical Fighter Training Squadron (GSU at Williams AFB, Arizona)
- 426th Tactical Fighter Training Squadron (formerly 4515th CCTS)
- 550th Tactical Fighter Training Squadron (formerly 4516th CCTS)
- 69th Tactical Fighter Training Squadron (formerly 4518th CCTS) (F-104G West German training squadron)*
- 418th Tactical Fighter Training Squadron (formerly 4519th CCTS) (F-104G West German training squadron)*

* Assigned to the 58th TFTW with the inactivation of the 4540th Combat Crew Training Group (see below)

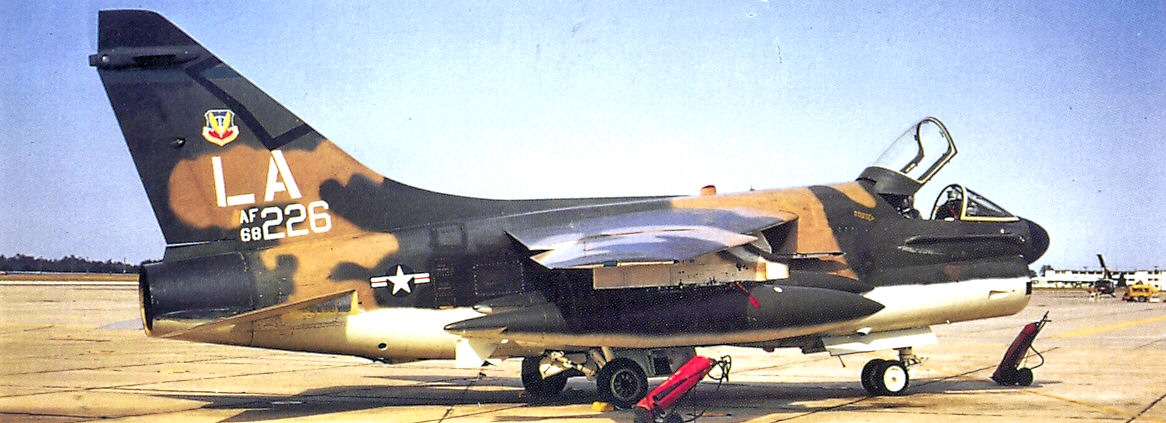
Ling-Temco-Vought A-7D-3-CV Corsair II (68–6226) of the 310th TFTS, May 1971

Upon activation of the 310th TFTS, the squadron began receiving new A-7D Corsair II ground-attack aircraft from Ling-Temco-Vought, with a mission to train USAF pilots in the new aircraft. Its F-100s were reassigned to other squadrons, which flew the F-100s of the 4510th CCTS. The 310th TFTS sent its A-7Ds to the 333d TFS at Davis-Monthan AFB in July 1971, and became an F-4C RTU.

The 425th TFTS was assigned to the 58th as a geographically separate unit in 1969, assigned to Williams AFB. The squadron was established in December 1963 as the 4441st CCTS, with a mission to train Republic of Vietnam Air Force pilots on the Northrup F-5A Freedom Fighter. The F-5 training continued at Williams after the end of the Vietnam War, becoming a squadron to train Military Assistance Program pilots from over 20 nations on the F-5. It was discontinued in 1989 and the 425th was inactivated.

In the summer of 1971, the 58th TFTW received F-4C Phantom IIs, and the wing assumed the F-4 pilot-training role that was formerly done by the 4453d CCTW at Davis-Monthan, when that base was converted to an operational A-7D base by the arrival of the 355th TFW from Takhli RTAFB, Thailand.

====== F-15 Eagle era ======
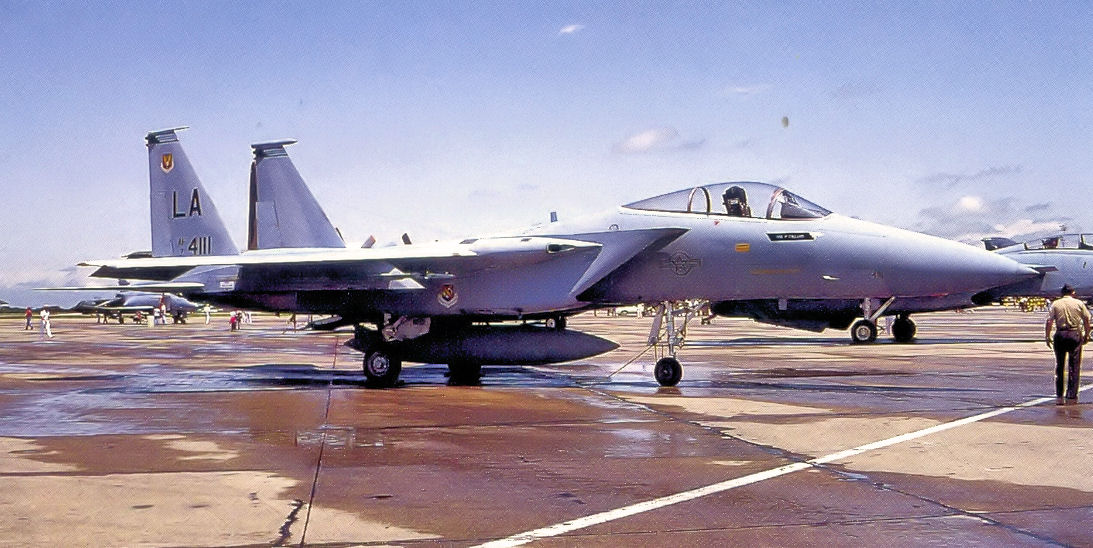
A 555th Tactical Fighter Training Squadron McDonnell Douglas F-15A-11-MC Eagle 74–0111, is on arrival at Luke AFB, November 1974. It was the first production F-15A arrival for training.

In November 1974, the Air Force's newest air superiority fighter, the F-15 Eagle, came to Luke. To accommodate the F-15, the 555th Tactical Fighter Training Squadron was activated. The early F-15As, however, were quite troublesome, with engine problems limiting their effectiveness and availability.

In June 1976, a second F-15 training squadron was established, with the 4461st Tactical Fighter Training Squadron standing up on 23 June. The assets of the 4461st TFTS were redesignated as 461st Tactical Fighter Training Squadron on 1 July 1977. The 550th TFTS traded in its F-4s in August 1977, becoming the third F-15 training squadron. The F-15As, which remained troublesome throughout the 1970s, were replaced in 1982 with the updated F-15D.

On 25 August 1979, the 405th Tactical Training Wing was activated at Luke by TAC to consolidate the F-15 Eagle Replacement Training Unit operations. It took over the 425th, 461st 550th and 555th Tactical Fighter Training Squadrons

The 426th Tactical Fighter Training Squadron converted from F-4 Phantom II to F-15 training in January 1981 specifically to support the TAC Air Defense Command training mission inherited from the inactivated Aerospace Defense Command, which was merged into TAC. On 19 November 1990, the 555th TFTS changed its course from air superiority combat training with the Eagle to air defense interceptor training with the F-15C/D when TAC began assigning F-15s to interceptor duty, the 426th being inactivated.

The 461st TFTS received its first F-15E Strike Eagle in July 1988, and the 550th TFTS became the second F-15E training squadron in March 1989.

On 1 October 1991, due to the implementation of the Objective Wing at Luke and the "One base, one wing" policy, the 405th TTW was shut down and the F-15s were reassigned back to the 58th TTW. Between 1977 and 1991, Luke AFB had more fighter aircraft than any other base which earned the moniker “Fighter Country,” which was prominently displayed around the base.

In 1993, First Lt. Jeannie M. Flynn became the first woman to complete training in the F-15E Strike Eagle at Luke. After earning a master's degree in aerospace engineering from Stanford University, she graduated first in her UPT class at Laughlin AFB in December 1992, and chose the F-15 after USAF Chief of Staff General Merrill McPeak opened the door for women to fly combat aircraft.

====== F-16 Falcon era ======
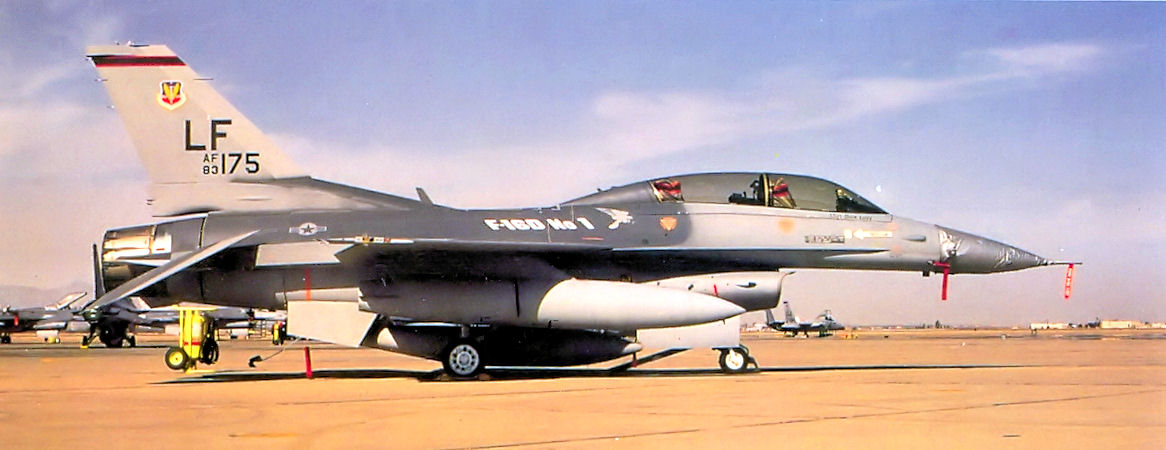
312th TFTS – F-16D Block 25 83-1175 Aircraft marked as "F-16D No. 1"

The 310th and 311th TFTS retained their F-4Cs until April 1982, ending the Phantom era at Luke, receiving Block 1 F-16A Fighting Falcons in November 1982 and April 1983. Luke-based F-16s began carrying tail codes "LF". 310th TFTS officially began training fighter pilots 2 February 1983.

- 312th Tactical Fighter Training Squadron, activated on 1 October 1984, first F-16C squadron in the Air Force
- 314th Tactical Fighter Training Squadron, activated on 1 October 1986, second F-16C squadron in the Air Force

In 1990, Luke AFB was placed on the National Priorities List, often called the superfund list in 1990. After many years of cleanup and remediation, on 22 April, it 2002 became the first USAF base to be removed from the list, after satisfying the requirement to remove pollution dating back as far as World War II.

===== 58th Operations Group =====
The end of the Cold War in the early 1990s brought significant changes to the base. On 1 October 1991, the 58th Tactical Training Wing adopted the Air Force Objective Organization Plan, and was redesignated simply as the 58th Fighter Wing (58 FW). All operational fighter training squadrons were reassigned to the new 58th Operations Group (58 OG). Training units also redesignated as "fighter squadrons". Units assigned to the 58 OG were:

- 310th Fighter Squadron, F-16C/D Fighting Falcon
- 311th Fighter Squadron, F-16C/D Fighting Falcon
- 312th Fighter Squadron, inactivated, aircraft to 310th, 311th, 314th FS
- 314th Fighter Squadron, F-16C/D Fighting Falcon
- 461st Fighter Squadron, F-15E Strike Eagle (reassigned back from 405th FW, 1 October 1991)
- 550th Fighter Squadron, F-15E Strike Eagle (reassigned back from 405th FW, 1 October 1991)
- 555th Fighter Squadron, F-15C/D Eagle (reassigned back from 405th FW, 1 October 1991)

In 1991, the Base Realignment and Closure commission ordered that all flightline activities cease at MacDill AFB by 1993. The host unit at MacDill AFB, the 56th Fighter Wing, moved its F-16 training to Luke AFB, and Luke became an exclusive F-16 Fighting Falcon training base. The F-15s were reassigned to Seymour Johnson AFB, North Carolina, to accommodate additional F-16 training at Luke.

In addition, the 58th Fighter Wing was inactivated and moved to Kirtland AFB, New Mexico, with the historical senior 56th FW taking over all assets at Luke. At Kirtland, the wing was redesignated as the 58th Special Operations Wing, leaving all aircraft and equipment at Luke, and reassigned to Air Force Special Operations Command, replacing the Air Training Command 542d Crew Training Wing.

On 1 June 1992, Tactical Air Command was inactivated, and the new Air Combat Command (ACC) replaced it, assuming jurisdiction of Luke AFB.

On 30 December 1992, the 425th Fighter Squadron was activated at Luke AFB. The mission of the 425th was to provide advanced weapons and tactics continuation for Republic of Singapore Air Force's F-16 pilots and maintenance personnel. Aircraft had already arrived for the squadron in October and shortly after in the new year, pilot training began in January 1993.

==== Air Education and Training Command ====
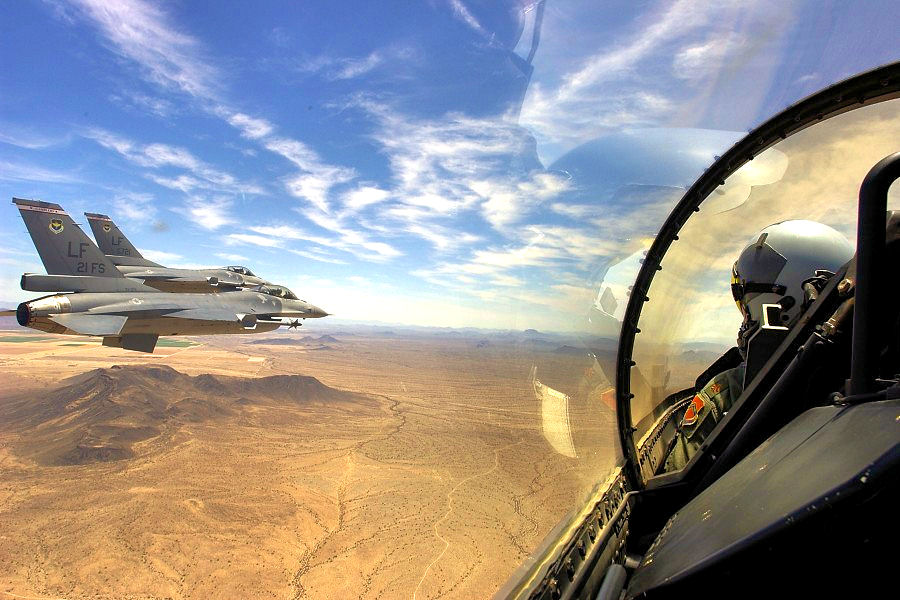
ROCAF 6610 (93–0711) and 6620 (93–0721) in USAF markings flying in formation as part of the 21st FS

On 1 April 1994, after 24 years at Luke AFB, the 58th Fighter Wing was replaced by the 56th Fighter Wing (56 FW), relocated from MacDill AFB, Florida, due to Base Realignment and Closure Commission action, as part of the Air Force Heritage Program. With the reassignment, jurisdiction of Luke AFB was transferred to Air Education and Training Command (AETC), Nineteenth Air Force (19 AF) as a result of the Air Force deciding to consolidate all Air Force training programs under AETC. The 56th Operations Group assumed control over all operational fighter squadrons.

The transfer of Luke to AETC gave the command front-line aircraft, bases, and facilities that could be used for realistic operational training. With the return of AETC to Luke, producing a task-certified or more mission-ready apprentice became possible, and operational units could reduce the amount of on-the-job training provided to new airmen.

Within a year, the wing realignment to make the 56 OG an exclusive F-16 group took place. The 555th Fighter Squadron was reassigned to USAFE on 25 March 1994 as part of a realignment of Aviano AB, Italy; its F-15C/D Eagles were sent to Tyndall AFB, Florida, where F-15 air defense interceptor training was being consolidated under the First Air Force. The F-15E Strike Eagle squadrons (461st, 550th) were also inactivated, with their Strike Eagles being sent to Seymour Johnson AFB under the 4th Fighter Wing.

F-15 training ended with the last "LA" tail coded F-15 (Luke Arizona) leaving on 26 September 1995, when the 550th Fighter Squadron inactivated, 21 years after the first TF-15A arrived at Luke.

With the transfer of the Eagles, additional F-16 training units were assigned to the 56 OG, all tail-coded "LF" (Luke Field):

- 61st Fighter Squadron, 1 April 1994 (formerly at MacDill AFB)
- 62d Fighter Squadron, 18 March 1994 (formerly at MacDill AFB)
- 63d Fighter Squadron, 1 April 1994 (formerly at MacDill AFB)
- 308th Fighter Squadron, reassigned from 58th OG
- 309th Fighter Squadron, reassigned from 58th OG
- 310th Fighter Squadron, reassigned from 58th OG
- 425th Fighter Squadron, reassigned from 58th OG (joint USAF-RSAF unit)

The 21st Fighter Squadron was activated on 8 August 1996 to train Taiwanese Republic of China Air Force F-16A/B crews at Luke AFB. Empty hangars were refurbished and aircrews were pulled in from other units on base. By January 1997, several ROCAF F-16A/B block 20s had been delivered and the first training flights began for their crews. Despite being A/B models, the aircraft were new construction from General Dynamics, with modern avionics and engines, and were considered to be more advanced than the F-16C/Ds being flown from Luke AFB. The aircraft carry USAF markings and serial numbers, and also the "LF" tail code.

On 20 September 1999, an F-16D crashed at Luke AFB, marking the 56th Fighter Wing's seventh class-A mishap in FY '99. In all cases, the pilots ejected safely. Engine problems caused most of the mishaps. The 56th Fighter Wing commander, Brig. Gen. John Barry, grounded the wing's F-16s after the second mishap. Maintenance personnel discovered that engine augmentor ducts had failed in both cases. They developed a new inspection procedure to identify cracks, which was subsequently used throughout the Air Force. A manufacturing defect in turbine blades was responsible for many of the mishaps, and General Barry grounded the fleet a second time to allow maintainers to upgrade the turbine blades, which improved safety.

On 8 March 2000, the 50,000th fighter pilot had graduated from Luke AFB, Arizona, since the Army Air Forces started training at this location in July 1941.

After the 11 September 2001 terrorist attacks, Luke suspended routine flight-training operations, as the Federal Aviation Administration shut down the nation's airways to all but select military flights. Aircraft of the 56th Fighter Wing were deployed to fly combat air patrols over New York City and Washington, DC, in the immediate aftermath of the attacks in support of Operation Noble Eagle. Although the 56th Fighter Wing does not deploy aircraft to United States Air Forces Central Command Expeditionary units as part of the global war on terrorism, Luke airmen routinely deploy to USAFCENT in AEF deployment cycles, engaging in combat in support of Operation Enduring Freedom; Operation Iraqi Freedom, and other expeditionary operations as tasked.

On March 28, 2001, Arizona governor Jane Dee Hull signed new legislation to protect military airfields, such as Luke Air Force Base, in Arizona. The law was one of the first by any state created to protect military airfields. It called for compatible use of the land around the airfields. Arizona later created other legislation to further increase the protections of Air Force bases in the state, especially Luke. Later that same year, in June the base's new $3.8-million control tower went into operation.

In 2002, the 56th Fighter Wing became responsible for the nearby Barry M. Goldwater Training Range, and was concerned that urban development near the base would curtail flight training if left unchecked. In addition, the munitions storage area (MSA) stood outside of the base compound, adding a burden to the Security Forces Squadron. In October 2002, Senator John McCain of Arizona shepherded a MILCON funding insert of $13 million to purchase 273 acres (1.10 km^{2}) needed to incorporate the MSA into the base perimeter and to acquire additional land to preserve access to the Goldwater Range.

BRAC 2005 directed that the older Block 25 F-16s be sent to Air National Guard units; this change reduced the number of fighter squadrons, with the 61st and 63d Fighter Squadrons inactivating in 2009 and 2010.

In 2005, the 56th Fighter Wing at Luke Air Force Base was the largest fighter unit in the world. This unit was made up of eight fighter squadrons (21st, 61st, 62nd, 63rd, 308th, 309th, 310th and 425th) which used an air fleet of 189 F-16 Fighter Falcons.

==== Air Defense Command ====
In 1959, Air Defense Command established a Semi Automatic Ground Environment (SAGE) Data Center (DC-21) at Luke AFB. The SAGE system was a network linking Air Force (and later FAA) general-surveillance radar stations into a centralized center for air defense, intended to provide early warning and response for a Soviet nuclear attack. It was initially under the Phoenix Air Defense Sector, established on 15 June 1959. It was inactivated on 1 April 1966, and redesignated as the 27th Air Division. DC-21 with its AN/FSQ-7 computer remained under the 27th AD until 19 November 1969, when it was inactivated and its assets absorbed by the 26th Air Division. DC-21 was inactivated on 9 December 1983, when technology advances made SAGE obsolete.

==== Air Force Reserve ====
Air Force Reserve training began at Luke AFB in 1960 with the activation of the 302d Air Rescue Squadron. The 302d had a distinguished heritage and lineage, being formed as the 302d Fighter Squadron, one of four African-American fighter squadrons to enter combat during World War II. It saw combat in the European Theater of Operations and Mediterranean Theater of Operations from 17 February 1944 – 20 February 1945.

For many years, the 302d operated a variety of air-rescue helicopters from the base, training for and performing search-and-rescue missions, in addition to some medical air-evacuation missions. In 1974, its mission changed to training for the combat search and rescue role, while continuing to perform some search and rescue.

The squadron's mission changed again, in 1987, to a fighter role as the 302d Tactical Fighter Squadron, being assigned to the AFRES (now AFRC) 944th Fighter Wing. The 302d TFS was equipped with block 25/32 F-16C Fighting Falcons, carrying tail code "LR". The 302d TFS trained for counterair, interdiction, and close air support missions. It deployed several times since late 1992 to Turkey to help enforce the no-fly zone over Iraq and to Italy to support UN air operations in the Balkans. The 302d FS was moved to Holloman AFB, New Mexico, and converted to F-22A Raptors on 2 October 2007.

The 69th Fighter Squadron was activated at Luke on 1 February 2010, equipped with block 42 F-16Cs, tail code "LF", with the 69th FS carrying a black tail band. The 69th had formerly been assigned to Luke as an active-duty squadron from 1969 to 1983, flying Lockheed F-104G Starfighters training pilots from the West German Air Force.

=== West German Air Force training at Luke ===
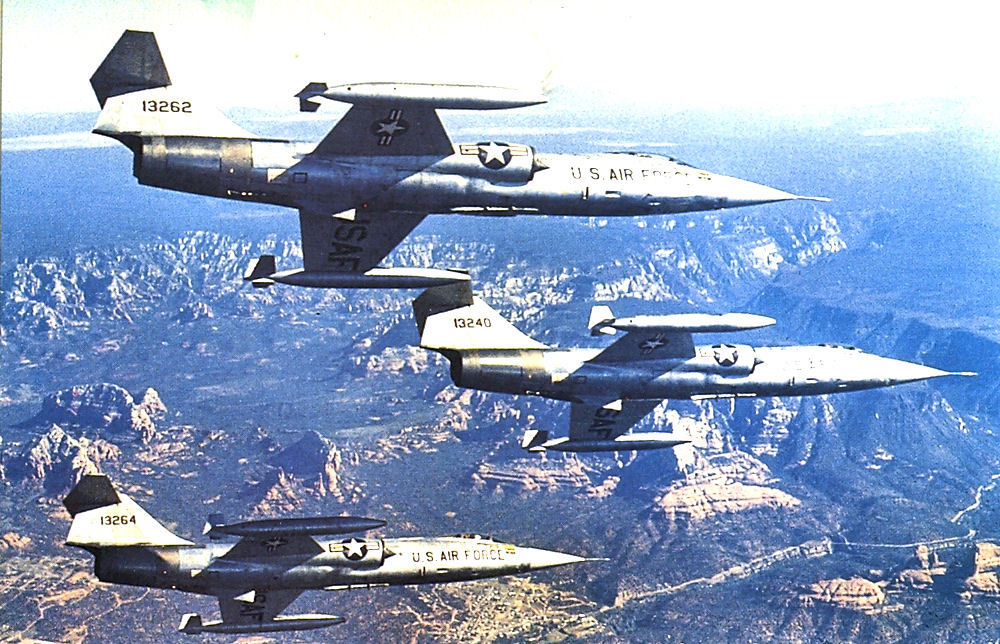
Three West German Air Force Lockheed F-104G Starfighters fly in formation over Arizona.

From 1957 to 1965, 830 pilots from the West German air force were trained on the F-84 at Luke AFB under ATC. Since Northern European weather and operational restrictions placed severe limitations on the amount of training, Luke AFB was chosen, where flying conditions were ideal for most of the time.

On 4 April 1963, the USAF and the Federal Republic of Germany signed contracts for a unique pilot-training program. One agreement called for undergraduate pilot training for West German Air Force (GAF) and West German Navy (GN) students in Cessna T-37 Tweet and Northrop T-38 Talon jet aircraft at Williams AFB, Arizona. The second agreement provided for advanced fighter training in the Lockheed Lockheed F-104G Starfighter at Luke AFB. The two programs were interrelated. Graduates of the basic flight training at Williams were programmed for the advanced training at Luke, resulting in an almost two-year tour of duty in the United States for the young German pilots. The advanced training at Luke was the unique aspect of the program.

The host 4510th Combat Crew Training Wing at Luke was tasked with providing the advanced flying training. On 20 February 1964, the 4540th Combat Crew Training Group (CCTG) was organized and designated to conduct GAF training at Luke. The group was activated on 1 April. Prior to designating the 4540th CCTG, the 4518th Combat Crew Training Squadron was activated on 1 March 1964 and was reassigned to the 4540th CCTG upon the later's activation. A second squadron, the 4519th Combat Crew Training Squadron, was assigned to the group, effective 1 July 1964. The German unit was named "2. Deutsche Luftwaffen-Ausbildungsstaffel F-104 USA (2. DtLwAusbStff F-104 USA)" (2nd German Air Force Training Squadron F-104 USA). Although remaining German property, the Starfighters carried USAF insignia and were assigned American serial numbers.

By mid-July 1964, 23 TF-104G and 12 F-104G were assigned to Luke. On 26 August 1964, 14 USAF F-104 instructor pilots graduated in the second class conducted at Luke. With a sufficient number of aircraft and instructor pilots, preparations were on target to receive the first advanced training class scheduled for October 1964. Aircraft inventories at Luke peaked in 1967 and 1968. In 1967, 100 aircraft were assigned, 62 F-104G and 38 TF-104G. The total increased to 102 in 1968, 61 F-104G models and 41 TF-104G models.

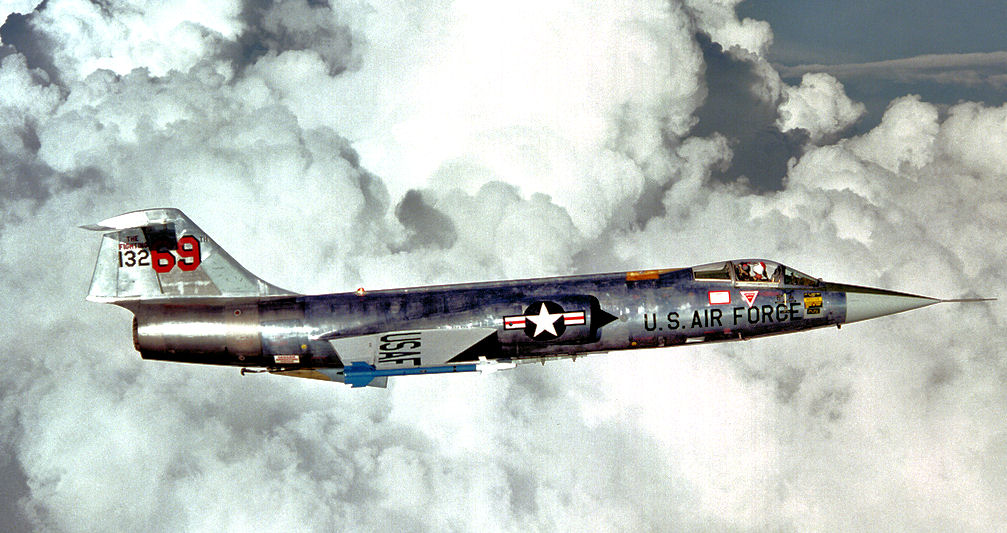
69th TFTS/West German F-104G Starfighter

Major changes occurred in organization on 1 October 1969, when the 58th Tactical Fighter Training Wing was activated, replacing the 4510th CCTW as the host unit at Luke. Concurrently, the 69th Tactical Fighter Training Squadron and the 418th Tactical Fighter Training Squadron were activated as F-104 training units, replacing the 4518th CCTS and 4519th CCTS.

By 1975, a decrease in training requirements was accompanied by a corresponding decrease in the fleet size. The two squadrons were consolidated in 1976 with the 418th TFTS inactivating on 1 October 1976. Also, a storage program was started to preserve the lifespan of the aircraft. As of 30 September 1975, some 13 aircraft were in flyable storage. Training of West German Air Force pilots in the F-104G continued until late 1982. The Germans flew more than 900 Starfighters totaling in excess of 269,750 hours and produced 1,868 F-104 pilots. The 69th TFTS inactivated on 16 March 1983.

A third F-104G squadron at Luke, the 4443d Combat Crew Training Squadron, differed from the West German squadrons in that it was associated with the Military Assistance Program (MAP) with students from NATO and other friendly nations being trained in the Starfighter. On 22 May 1964, TAC relieved the 4443d CCTS from its assignment to the 831st Air Division at George AFB, California, and reassigned it to the 4540th CCTG, effective 1 August 1964. The move consolidated all F-104 training at one location. The F-104s that were purchased with MAP funds were assigned USAF serial numbers for record-keeping purposes, although they never carried USAF insignia. On 15 June 1969, the 4443rd CCTS was inactivated.

==== Air Combat Command ====
On 17 July 2026, after a 33 year tenure in Air Education and Training Command, Luke Air Force Base returned to Air Combat Command as part of the Fifteenth Air Force.

=== Previous names ===
- Litchfield Park Air Base, c. 15 February 1941
- Luke Field, 6 June 1941
- Luke Air Force Base, 10 June 1949

=== Major commands to which assigned ===
- West Coast Air Corps Training Center, 3 July 1941 – 23 January 1942
- Air Corps Flying Training Command, 23 January – 15 March 1942
- AAF Flying Training Command, 15 March 1942 – 31 July 1943
- AAF Training Command, 31 July 1943 – 1 July 1946
- Air Training Command, 1 July – December 1946; 1 January 1951 – 1 July 1958
- Tactical Air Command, 1 July 1958 – 1 June 1992
- Air Combat Command, 1 June 1992 – 1 July 1993
- Air Education and Training Command, 1 July 1993 – 17 July 2026
- Air Combat Command, 17 July 2026 - Present

The facility was placed on temporary reduced activity status on 6 July 1946, and was temporarily inactivated on 31 October 1946. It became a subinstallation of Williams Air Force Base, Arizona, from 3 December 1946 to 5 March 1951. It was removed from inactive status and placed on active status on 1 January 1951.

=== Major units assigned ===
- Air Corps Advanced Flying School

Re-designated Army Air Forces Advanced Flying School
Re-designated Army Air Forces Pilot School (Advanced Single-Engine), 20 May 1941 – 6 July 1946

- 90th Air Base Group, 1 August 1941 – 19 May 1942
- 3003d Army Air Force Base Unit, 1 May 1944 – 31 October 1945
- 3028th Army Air Force Base Unit, 1 May 1944 – 30 November 1946
- 408th Army Air Force Base Unit, 1 October 1946 – 1 March 1947
- 127th Fighter (later Training) Group, 23 February 1951 – 1 November 1952
- USAF Air Crew School

Re-designated USAF Combat Crew Training School, 1 March 1951 – 1 November 1953

- 4510th Combat Support Group, 1 November 1952 – 15 October 1969
- 4510th Combat Crew Training Group, 1 November 1952 – 1 August 1963
- 4510th Combat Crew Training Wing, 1 November 1952 – 15 October 1969
- 3600th Air Demonstration Flight, 25 May 1953 – 23 June 1956
- Phoenix Air Defense Sector, 15 June 1959

Re-designated: 27th Air Division, 1 April 1966
Re-designated: 26th Air Division, 19 November 1969 – 31 August 1983

- 4629th Air Defense Squadron (SAGE)*, 1 July 1972

Re-designated 26th Air Defense Squadron (SAGE)*, 1 January 1975 – 9 December 1983

- 58th Tactical Training Wing, 15 October 1969 – 1 April 1994
- 405th Tactical Training Wing, 29 August 1979 – 1 October 1991
- 832d Air Division, 1 December 1980 – 1 October 1991
- 56th Fighter Wing, 1 April 1994–present

Note: * Operated DC-21 ADCOM/ADTAC SAGE blockhouse

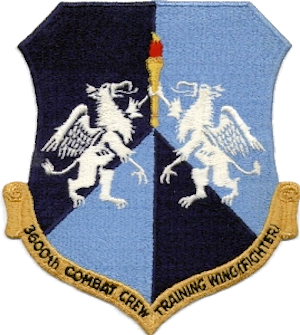
3600th Flying Training Wing

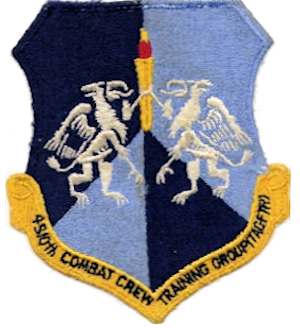
4510th Combat Crew Training Group

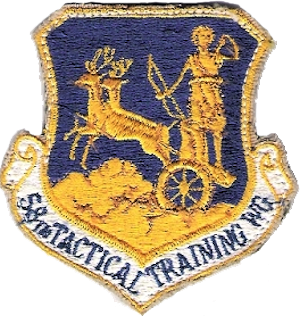
File:58th Tactical Training Wing

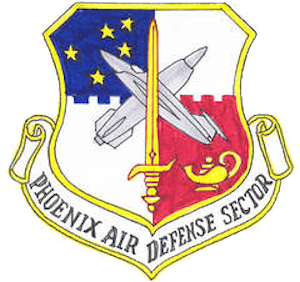
Phoenix Air Defense Sector

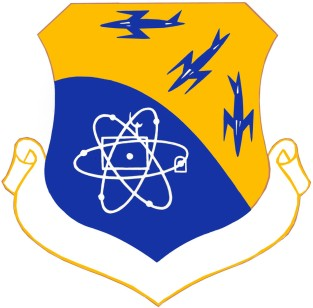
26th Air Division

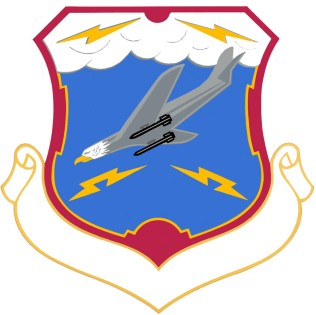
27th Air Division

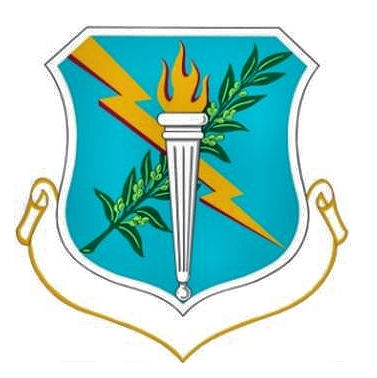
832d Air Division

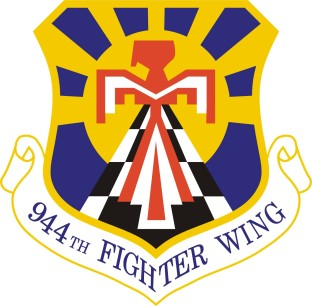
944th Fighter Wing (AFRC)

== Role and operations ==
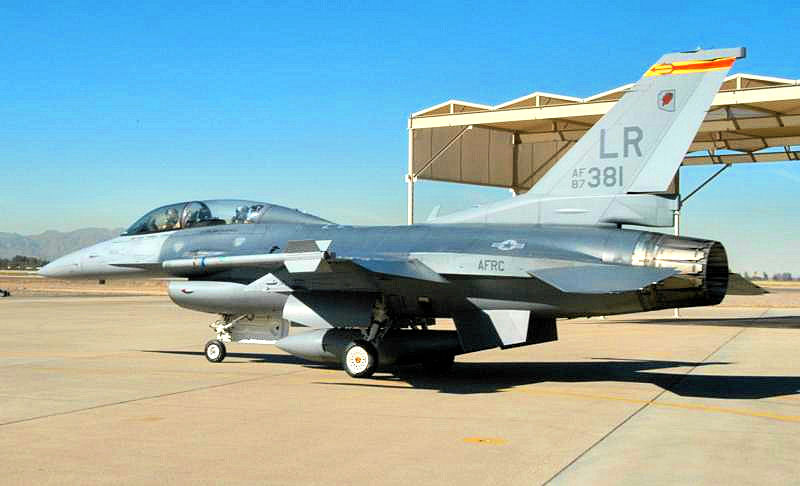
302d FS F-16D Block 32H 87–301

Luke Air Force Base is an active-duty F-16 Fighting Falcon training base with 170 F-16s assigned. The host command at Luke is the 56th Fighter Wing (56 FW), under Air Command Command's Fifteenth Air Force.

The base population includes about 7,500 military members and 15,000 family members. With about 80,000 retired military members living in greater Phoenix, the base services a total population of more than 100,000 people.

=== F-16 Fighting Falcon operations ===
The host unit, the 56th Fighter Wing, is tasked to train F-35 and F-16 fighter pilots and maintainers. Historically, the wing graduated more than 400 F-16 pilots and 470 crew chiefs annually. The 56th FW is composed of four groups, 27 squadrons, including six training squadrons. There are several tenant units on base, including the 944th Fighter Wing, assigned to 10th Air Force and the Air Force Reserve. The 56th Fighter Wing also trains more than 700 maintenance technicians each year.

In addition to flying and maintaining the F-16, Luke airmen also deploy to support on-going operations in Iraq, Afghanistan and to combatant commanders in other locations around the world. In 2004, more than 900 Luke airmen deployed, with most supporting Operation Iraqi Freedom.

The 56th Operations Group (OG) has operational control and responsibility for the entire fighter-training mission at Luke. It has the tail code: "LF". It comprises:

- 61st Fighter Squadron ("Top Dogs", 1st F-35 Lightning II squadron on base, re-activated October 2013)
- 62d Fighter Squadron ("Spikes", 2nd F-35 squadron on base, re-activated June 2015)
- 63d Fighter Squadron ("Panthers", 3rd F-35 squadron on base, re-activated August 2016)
- 308th Fighter Squadron ("Emerald Knights", 4th F-35 squadron on base, re-activated December 2018)
- 309th Fighter Squadron ("Wild Ducks", tailband: blue & white)
- 310th Fighter Squadron ("Top Hats", tailband: green & yellow)
- 425th Fighter Squadron ("Black Widows", tailband: red & black)
- 607th Air Control Squadron "Rattlers"
- 56th Operations Support Squadron "Wizards"
- 56th Training Squadron

The 56th Maintenance Group (MXG) provides aircraft maintenance on more than 79 F-16s and 29 F-35s, for the Air Force's only active duty F-16 and F-35 training wing. The 56th Mission Support Group (MSG) sustains the F-16 Fighting Falcon and F-35 Lightning II, provides for the community, and delivers responsive combat support. The 56th Medical Group (MDG) is an outpatient only Medical Treatment Facility, which serves more than 84,000 beneficiaries in the Phoenix area.

The 944th Fighter Wing is an adjunct Air Force Reserve wing to the 56th FW that trains Air Force F-16 pilots for reserve duty. It comprises the 69th Fighter Squadron ("Werewolves", tailband: black).

=== Public reception ===
The public has been more accommodating to the military operations at Luke Air Force base compared to other Arizona installations like the Davis-Monthan Air Force Base, according to a 2015 study. This is due to a buffer of public land around it, that helps against encroachment and land use conflicts. Also, the private sector in Glendale has been helping to maintain the buffer of public land, and with it the Arizona defense economy. This is because if encroachment impacts a site's mission, it loses value for the military operation, and base closure is more likely to occur.

=== Barry M. Goldwater Air Force Range ===
An integral part of Luke's F-16 fighter pilot training mission is the Barry M. Goldwater Air Force Range. The range consists of 1,900,000 acres (7,700 km^{2}) of relatively undisturbed Sonoran Desert southwest of Luke Air Force Base between Yuma and Tucson south of Interstate 8. Overhead are 57,000 cubic miles (240,000 km^{3}) of airspace where pilots practice air-to-air maneuvers and engage simulated battlefield targets on the ground. Roughly the size of Connecticut, the immense size of the complex allows for simultaneous training activities on nine air-to-ground and two air-to-air ranges. The Luke Air Force Base Range Management Office manages the eastern range activities and Marine Corps Air Station Yuma oversees operations on the western portion.

=== Naval Operational Support Center (NOSC) Phoenix ===
Since June 2012, Luke AFB has been the permanent home of Naval Operational Support Center (NOSC) Phoenix of the US Navy. A NOSC is a facility used to provide operational support for training and administrative services to Navy Reserve Units. NOSC Phoenix supports over 750 Navy Reservists in sixteen Navy Reserve units. The new 32,055-square-foot (2,980 m^{2}), one-story facility is located on a 1.85-acre (0.75 ha) site at Luke AFB with sufficient parking and a secured perimeter to meet current anti-terrorism and force protection standards. NOSC Phoenix serves a full-time command and administrative staff, a medical unit, and reservists during drill weekends. It also has a 4,800-square-foot (450 m^{2}) drill hall, command staff offices, reserve unit administration spaces, medical and dental examination areas, six classrooms, a distance learning center, a physical fitness room, and a quarterdeck. The $11.2 million facility is the first LEED Platinum certified building of the US Navy Reserve Force.

== Based units ==
Flying and notable non-flying units based at Luke Air Force Base.

Units marked GSU are Geographically Separate Units, which although based at Luke, are subordinate to a parent unit based at another location.

=== United States Air Force ===
Air Combat Command (ACC)

- Fifteenth Air Force
  - 56th Fighter Wing
  - 56th Comptroller Squadron
  - 56th Operations Group
    - 21st Fighter Squadron – F-16A/B Fighting Falcon
    - 56th Operations Support Squadron
    - 56th Training Squadron
    - 61st Fighter Squadron – F-35A Lightning II
    - 62nd Fighter Squadron – F-35A Lightning II
    - 63d Fighter Squadron – F-35A Lightning II
    - 308th Fighter Squadron – F-35A Lightning II
    - 309th Fighter Squadron – F-16C/D Fighting Falcon
    - 310th Fighter Squadron – F-35A Lightning II
    - 425th Fighter Squadron – F-16C/D Fighting Falcon
    - 607th Air Control Squadron
  - 56th Maintenance Group
    - 56th Aircraft Maintenance Squadron
    - 56th Component Maintenance Squadron
    - 56th Equipment Maintenance Squadron
    - 756th Aircraft Maintenance Squadron
  - 56th Medical Group
    - 56th Aerospace Medicine Squadron
    - 56th Dental Squadron
    - 56th Medical Operations Squadron
    - 56th Medical Support Squadron
  - 56th Mission Support Group
    - 56th Civil Engineer Squadron
    - 56th Communications Squadron
    - 56th Contracting Squadron
    - 56th Force Support Squadron
    - 56th Logistics Readiness Squadron
    - 56th Security Forces Squadron

Air Force Reserve Command (AFRC)

- Tenth Air Force
  - 944th Fighter Wing
    - 944th Operations Group
      - 52nd Fighter Squadron - F-35A Lightning II
      - 69th Fighter Squadron – F-16C/D Fighting Falcon and F-35A Lightning II
      - Operations Support Flight
      - Detachment 2
    - 944th Maintenance Group
      - 944th Aircraft Maintenance Squadron
      - 944th Maintenance Squadron
    - 944th Medical Group
      - 944th Aeromedical Staging Squadron
      - 944th Medical Squadron
    - 944th Mission Support Group
      - 944th Civil Engineer Squadron
      - 944th Force Support Squadron
      - 944th Logistics Readiness Squadron
      - 944th Security Forces Squadron

Air National Guard (ANG)

- Arizona Air National Guard
  - 162nd Fighter Wing
    - 107th Air Control Squadron (GSU)

=== United States Marines ===
US Marine Corps Forces Reserve

- 4th Marine Logistics Group
  - 6th Engineer Support Battalion
    - Bulk Fuel Company Charlie (GSU)

=== United States Navy ===
United States Navy Reserve

- Navy Operational Support Center – Phoenix

=== Italian Air Force ===
Italian Air Force

- 156th Flight Group (156° Gruppo Volo) – F-35A Lightning II (Operational Conversion Unit)

== See also ==
- Arizona World War II Army Airfields
- List of United States Air Force installations
- United States general surveillance radar stations

== Other sources ==
- This article incorporates public domain material from the Air Force Historical Research Agency
- Donald, David (2004). Century Jets: USAF Frontline Fighters of the Cold War. AIRtime. ISBN 1880588684
- Manning, Thomas A. (2005), History of Air Education and Training Command, 1942–2002. Office of History and Research, Headquarters, AETC, Randolph AFB, Texas. OCLC 71006954, 29991467
- Martin, Patrick (1994). Tail Code: The Complete History of USAF Tactical Aircraft Tail Code Markings. Schiffer Military Aviation History. ISBN 0887405134.
- McLaren, David. Republic F-84 Thunderjet, Thunderstreak & Thunderflash: A Photo Chronicle. Atglen, PA: Schiffer Military/Aviation History, 1998. ISBN 0764304445.
- Mueller, Robert (1989). Active Air Force Bases Within the United States of America on 17 September 1982. USAF Reference Series, Maxwell AFB, Alabama: Office of Air Force History. ISBN 0912799536
- Peake, William R, (2005), McDonnell Douglas F-4 Phantom II: Production and Operational Data, Midland Pub Ltd, ISBN 978-1857801903
- Ravenstein, Charles A. (1984). Air Force Combat Wings Lineage and Honors Histories 1947–1977. Maxwell AFB, Alabama: Office of Air Force History. ISBN 0912799129.
- USAAS-USAAC-USAAF-USAF Aircraft Serial Numbers – 1908 to present
- Rogers, Brian (2005). United States Air Force Unit Designations Since 1978. Hinkley, England: Midland Publications. ISBN 1857801970.
- Shaw, Frederick J. (2004), Locating Air Force Base Sites, History's Legacy, Air Force History and Museums Program, United States Air Force, Washington DC. OCLC 57007862, 1050653629
- A Handbook of Aerospace Defense Organization 1946–1980, by Lloyd H. Cornett and Mildred W. Johnson, Office of History, Aerospace Defense Center, Peterson Air Force Base, Colorado
- Winkler, David F. (1997), Searching the skies: the legacy of the United States Cold War defense radar program. Prepared for United States Air Force Headquarters Air Combat Command.
- Information for Luke AFB, AZ
- 56th Fighter Wing ushers in new era under new commander, reassigned to Air Combat Command
