= 302nd Fighter Squadron (United States) =

United States Air Force unit

302d Fighter Squadron

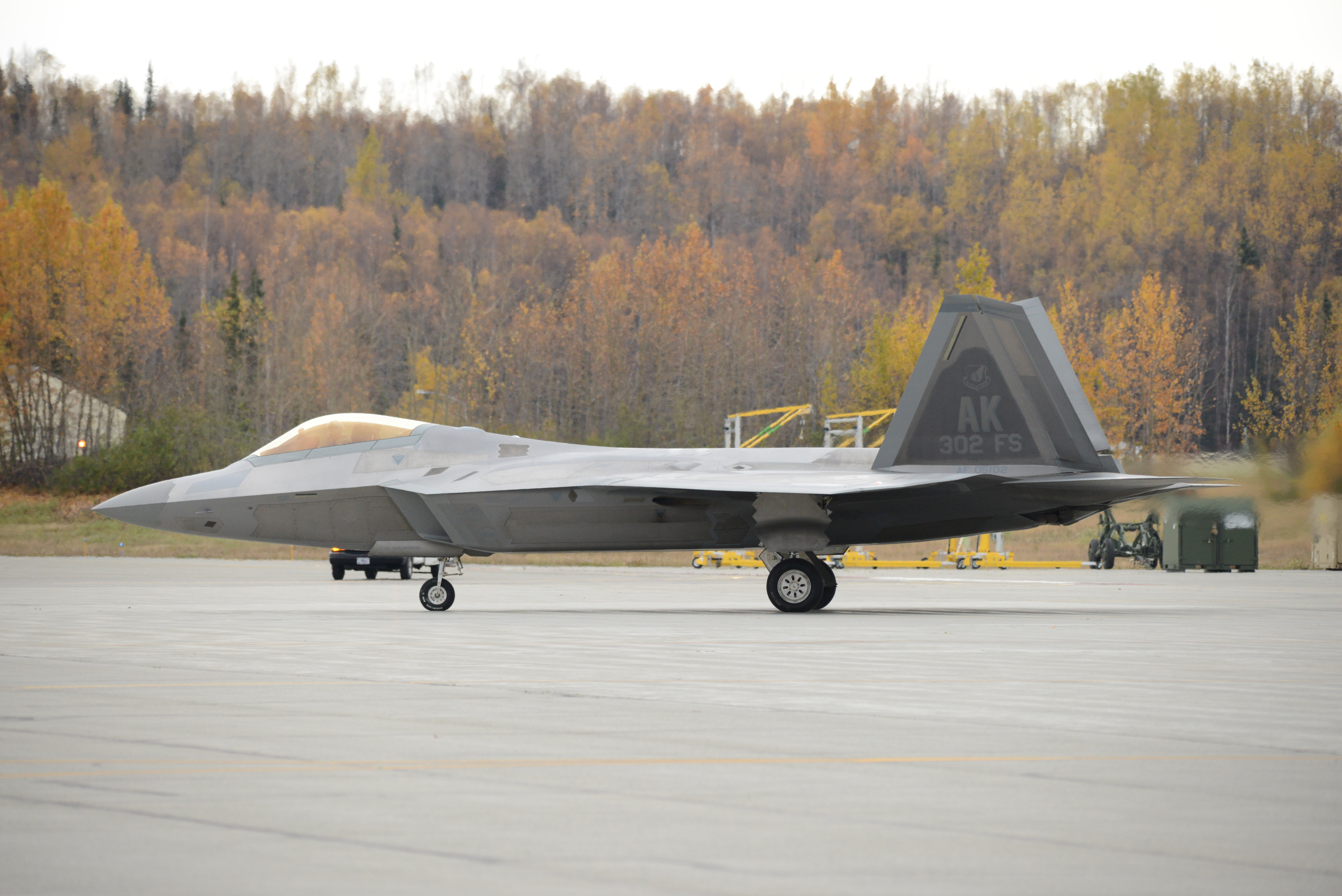
- The 302d Flighter Squadron flagship, F-22 Raptor 05-4102, at Joint Base Elmendorf-Richardson
- Active: 1942–1945; 1956–present
- Country: United States
- Branch: United States Air Force
- Role: Fighter
- Part of: Air Force Reserve Command
- Garrison/HQ: Elmendorf Air Force Base
- Motto(s): So That Others May Live (1956–1974) Anywhere, Anytime (1974–1987)
- Engagements: Mediterranean Theater of Operations
- Decorations: Air Force Outstanding Unit Award

Insignia
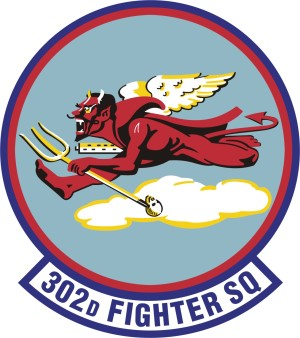
- 302d Fighter Squadron emblem (approved 25 May 2007

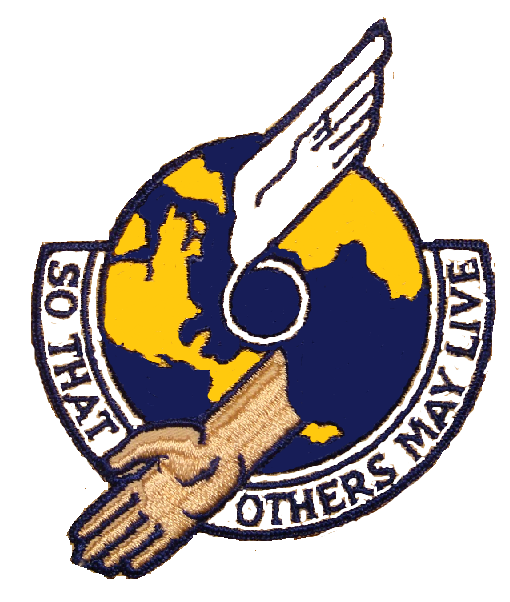
- 302d Air Rescue Squadron emblem

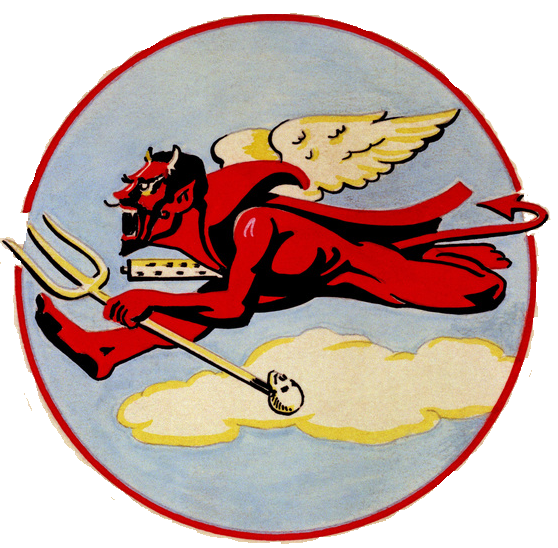
- 302d Fighter Squadron emblem (approved 2 November 1944

The 302d Fighter Squadron is part of the Air Force Reserve Command's 477th Fighter Group at Elmendorf Air Force Base, Alaska. It operates the Lockheed Martin F-22 Raptor conducting an air superiority mission.

== Mission ==
The 302d Fighter Squadron trains in the fighter missions of offensive counter air, defensive counter-air as well as strategic attack and interdiction.

== History ==
=== World War II ===
The 302d was one of four African-American fighter squadrons to enter combat during World War II. It saw combat in the European Theater of Operations and Mediterranean Theater of Operations from 17 February 1944 – 20 February 1945.

=== Air force reserve ===
From 1956 to 1974, the squadron was assigned to the Air Force Reserve where it trained for and performed search and rescue in addition to aeromedical evacuation missions, mainly in the southwestern United States.

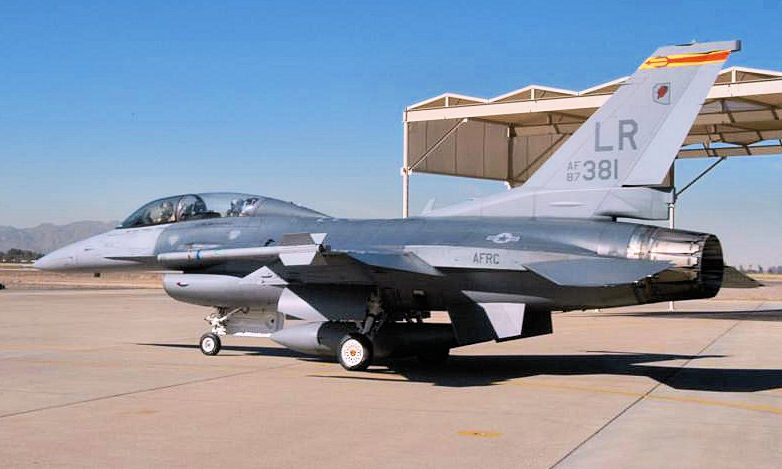
944th Fighter Wing F-16 Fighting Falcon taxis onto the runway at Luke AFB (Note: Aircraft is General Dynamics F-16D Block 32 serial 87-381. This F-16 was assigned to the United States Air Force Thunderbirds between 1992 and 1999.)

In 1974, its mission changed to training for a combat search and rescue role, while continuing to perform traditional humanitarian/non-combat search and rescue. The squadron's mission changed again in 1987 to a fighter role, training for counterair, interdiction, and close air support missions.

The unit that had been the 302d was reflagged as the 71st Special Operations Squadron and physically relocated to Davis-Monthan AFB, AZ. Concurrently, a new AFRES fighter squadron was established at Luke AFB, AZ and took over the 302d lineage as the 302d Tactical Fighter Squadron. With the transition of AFRES to Air Force Reserve Command (AFRC), the squadron deployed several times since late 1992 to Turkey to help enforce the no-fly zone over Iraq and to Italy to support UN air operations in the Balkans.

In 2007, the squadron relocated from Luke AFB to Elmendorf AFB, AK and transitioned from the F-16 Fighting Falcon to the F-22 Raptor, which it operates as an Associate AFRC unit the active duty Air Force's 3rd Wing.

== Lineage ==
302d Fighter Squadron (World War II)

- Constituted as the 302d Fighter Squadron on 4 July 1942

Activated on 13 October 1942
Redesignated 302d Fighter Squadron, Single Engine on 21 August 1944
Inactivated on 6 Mar 1945

- Consolidated with the 302d Special Operations Squadron as the 302d Special Operations Squadron on 19 September 1985

302d Fighter Squadron

- Constituted as the 302d Air Rescue Squadron on 1 August 1956

Activated in the reserve on 8 October 1956
Redesignated 302d Aerospace Rescue and Recovery Squadron on 18 January 1966
Redesignated 302d Special Operations Squadron on 10 April 1974
Consolidated with the 302d Fighter Squadron on 19 September 1985
Redesignated 302 Tactical Fighter Squadron on 1 July 1987
Redesignated 302d Fighter Squadron on 1 February 1992

=== Assignments ===
- 332d Fighter Group, 13 October 1942 – 6 March 1945
- 2348th Air Reserve Flying Center, 8 October 1956
- Fourth Air Force, 24 June 1960
- Sixth Air Force Reserve Region, 1 September 1960
- Western Air Force Reserve Region, 31 December 1969
- Tenth Air Force, 8 October 1976
- Fourth Air Force, 1 March 1983
- 944th Tactical Fighter Group (later 944 Fighter Group), 1 July 1987
- 944th Operations Group, 1 August 1992
- 477th Fighter Group, 1 October 2007 – present

=== Stations ===
- Tuskegee Army Air Field, Alabama, 13 October 1942
- Selfridge Field, Michigan, 29 March 1943
- Oscoda Army Air Field, Michigan, 19 November 1943
- Selfridge Field, Michigan, 1–22 December 1943
- Taranto, Italy, 1 February 1944
- Montecorvino Airfield, Italy, 7 February 1944
- Capodichino Airport, Italy, 6 March 1944
- Ramitelli Airfield, Italy, c. 28 May 1944 – 6 March 1945
- Williams Air Force Base, Arizona, 8 October 1956
- Luke Air Force Base, Arizona, 23 October 1960
- Elmendorf Air Force Base, Alaska, 1 Oct 2007 – present

=== Aircraft ===
- Bell P-39 Airacobra (1943–1944)
- Curtiss P-40 Warhawk (1943)
- Republic P-47 Thunderbolt (1944)
- North American P-51 Mustang (1944–1945)
- Grumman HU-16 Albatross (1956–1971)
- HH-34 Choctaw (1971–1974)
- CH-3 Sea King (1974–1987)
- HH-3 Jolly Green Giant (1985–1987)
- General Dynamics F-16 Fighting Falcon (1987–2007)
- Lockheed Martin F-22 Raptor (2007 – present)

== See also ==
- Tuskegee Airmen
