= 52nd Fighter Squadron =

52nd Fighter Squadron

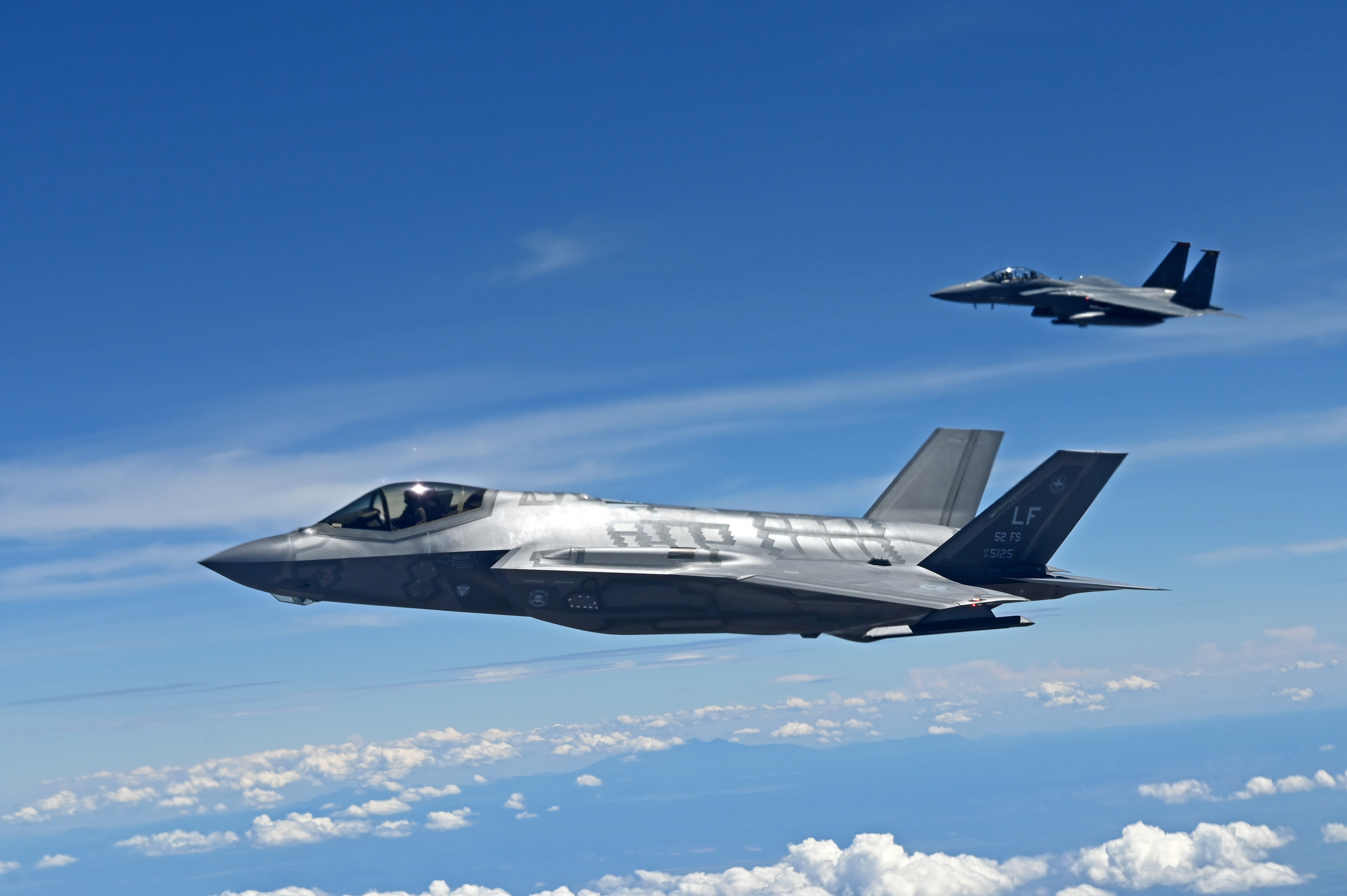
- One of the squadron's F-35A Lightning IIs flies in formation with a 307th Fighter Squadron F-15E Strike Eagle over Arizona, 2022
- Active: 1941–1944; 1949–1951; 2021–present
- Country: United States
- Branch: United States Air Force
- Role: Fighter
- Part of: Air Force Reserve Command; Tenth Air Force; 944th Fighter Wing; 944th Operations Group
- Garrison/HQ: Luke Air Force Base, Arizona
- Nickname: Ninjas
- Motto: Banzai!

The 52nd Fighter Squadron is an active reserve unit of the United States Air Force, assigned to the 944th Operations Group, 944th Fighter Wing. Stationed at Luke Air Force Base, Arizona, the squadron was most recently activated on 6 August 2021. Previously, it was with the Western Air Defense Force, based at Hamilton Air Force Base, California until its inactivation on 8 June 1951.

== History ==
=== World War II ===
Activated on 1 January 1941 as one of the three squadrons assigned to the 32nd Pursuit Group as part of the United States buildup of forces after the eruption of World War II. The squadron was equipped with Curtiss P-36A Hawks and Boeing P-26A Peashooters drawn from the 16th and 37th Pursuit Groups. After being formed at Albrook Field, Panama Canal Zone, the squadron was moved to Río Hato Army Air Base, Panama.

Following its stay at Rio Hato, the unit was ordered to France Field on 1 January 1942, and the squadron was equipped with Bell P-39 Airacobras. In early 1942, the Squadron was actively engaged in anti-submarine patrols, for which duty the aircraft were each armed with a 350-pound depth charge. Either 75-foot or 150-foot hydrostatic fuses were used, but, in every case, these were always dropped prior to returning to base.

On 12 May 1942, "C" Flight of the Squadron was sent to Seymour Island Airfield in the Galapagos Islands (just before the unit was redesignated as the 52nd Fighter Squadron on 15 May 1942), becoming one of the first fighter detachments stationed there, although the main squadron remained at France Field. The Galapagos Detachment was redesignated as "E" Flight on 31 October. The detachment's stay on the Galapagos lasted until 1 December 1942.

By 18 January 1943, the 52nd was at France Field. However, by 16 June, detachments were located at Rio Hato Army Air Base, Corozal (Canal Zone) and David Field, Panama, with Squadron Headquarters at France Field.

The unit ended its assignment to France Field on 23 March 1944 and, with the gradual wind-down of Sixth Air Force, was one of the units slated to be disbanded. The unit was subsequently disbanded on 25 May 1944.

=== Air Force Reserve ===
Activated in the reserve in June 1949 to train as an interceptor corollary squadron of the 78th Fighter-Interceptor Wing at Hamilton AFB. it was brought to active duty in June 1951 as a result of the Korean War, and inactivated a week later after its personnel were reassigned to become "fillers" in other USAF units.

The unit was reactivated at Luke Air Force Base, Arizona on 6 August 2021 by transitioning the 944th Operations Group's Detachment 2 to full squadron status.

== Lineage ==
- Constituted 52nd Pursuit Squadron (Fighter) on 22 November 1940

Activated on 1 January 1941
Redesignated 52nd Fighter Squadron on 15 May 1942
Disbanded on 25 May 1944

- Reconstituted on 16 May 1949

Activated in the reserve on 27 June 1949
Redesignated 52nd Fighter-Interceptor Squadron on 8 March 1950
Ordered to active service on 1 June 1951
Inactivated 8 June 1951

- Redesignated 52nd Fighter Squadron and activated in the reserve on 6 August 2021

=== Assignments ===
- 32nd Pursuit (later Fighter) Group, 1 January 1941
- Second Air Force, 8 April – 25 May 1944
- Fourth Air Force, 27 June 1949
- Western Air Defense Force, 1 August 1950 – 8 June 1951.
- 944th Operations Group, 6 August 2021 – present

=== Stations ===
- Rio Hato AAB, Panama, 1 January 1941
- Albrook Field, Canal Zone, 1 January 1941
- Rio Hato AAB, Panama, 21 August 1941
- France Field, Canal Zone, 13 December 1941 – 23 March 1944

Detachment at Seymour Island Army Airfield, Baltra, Galápagos Islands, 5 June – 1 December 1942

- Lincoln Army Airfield, Nebraska, 8 April – 25 May 1944
- Hamilton Air Force Base, California, 27 June 1949 – 8 June 1951
- Luke Air Force Base, Arizona, 6 August 2021 – present

=== Aircraft ===
- P-26 Peashooter, 1941
- P-36 Hawk, 1941–1942
- P-40 Warhawk, 1942–1944
- P-39 Airacobra, 1943–1944
- F-35A Lightning II, 2021–present
