= 37th Operations Group =

37th Operations Group

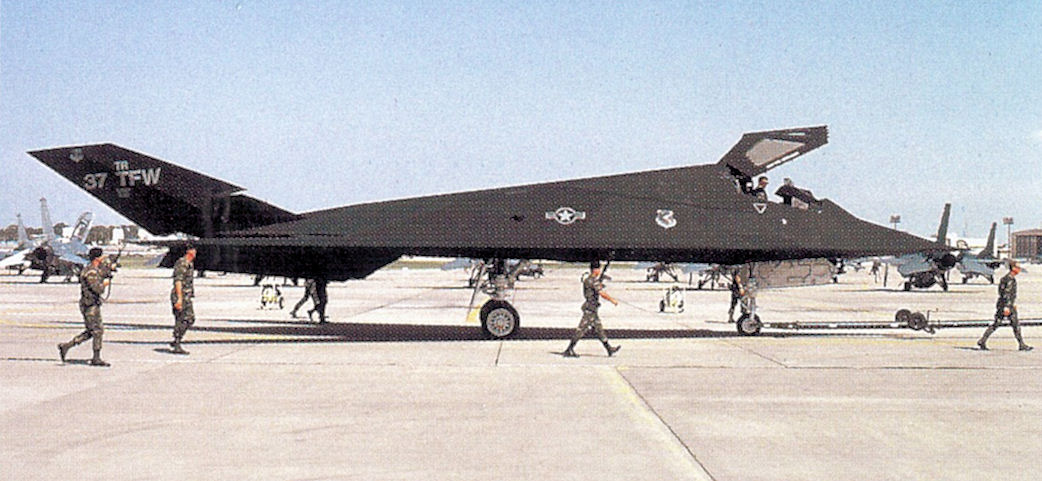
- F-117A Nighthawk 85-830 at Tonopah AFB after its return from Operation Desert Storm
- Active: 1940-1943; 1953; 1991-1992
- Country: United States
- Branch: United States Air Force
- Role: Fighter
- Part of: Air Combat Command
- Engagements: American Theater of World War II
- Decorations: Air Force Outstanding Unit Award

Insignia
- 37th Operations Group emblem

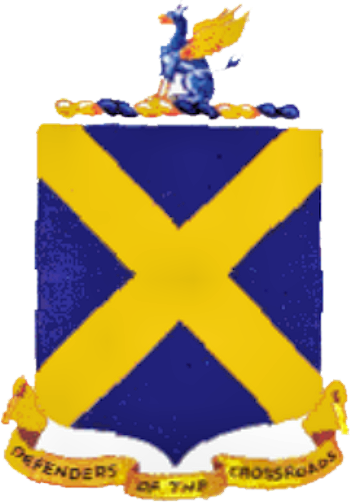
- 37th Fighter Group emblem

The 37th Operations Group is an inactive unit of the United States Air Force. It was last active at Tonopah Test Range Airport, Nevada, where it operated F-117 Nighthawk fighters. Its history and honors have been temporarily bestowed upon the 37th Training Wing.

The group was first activated in 1940 as the 37th Pursuit Group and participated in the defense of the Panama Canal during World War II until the reduced threat to the canal led to it being disbanded in 1943.

It was active briefly in 1953 as the 37th Fighter-Bomber Group, but never was equipped before being inactivated.

The group was most recently active when the USAF implemented the Objective Wing reorganization and was the operational element of the 37th Fighter Wing. It was inactivated when USAF moved its F-117 Nighthawk aircraft to Holloman Air Force Base, New Mexico, where they were assigned to the 49th Operations Group.

== History ==
=== World War II ===
The 37th Operations Group was first activated as the 37th Pursuit Group (Interceptor), which was constituted on 22 December 1939 as part of the United States Army Air Corps 54 Group Program. The unit was activated at Albrook Field, Panama Canal Zone on 1 February 1940. Its mission was the defense of the Panama Canal.

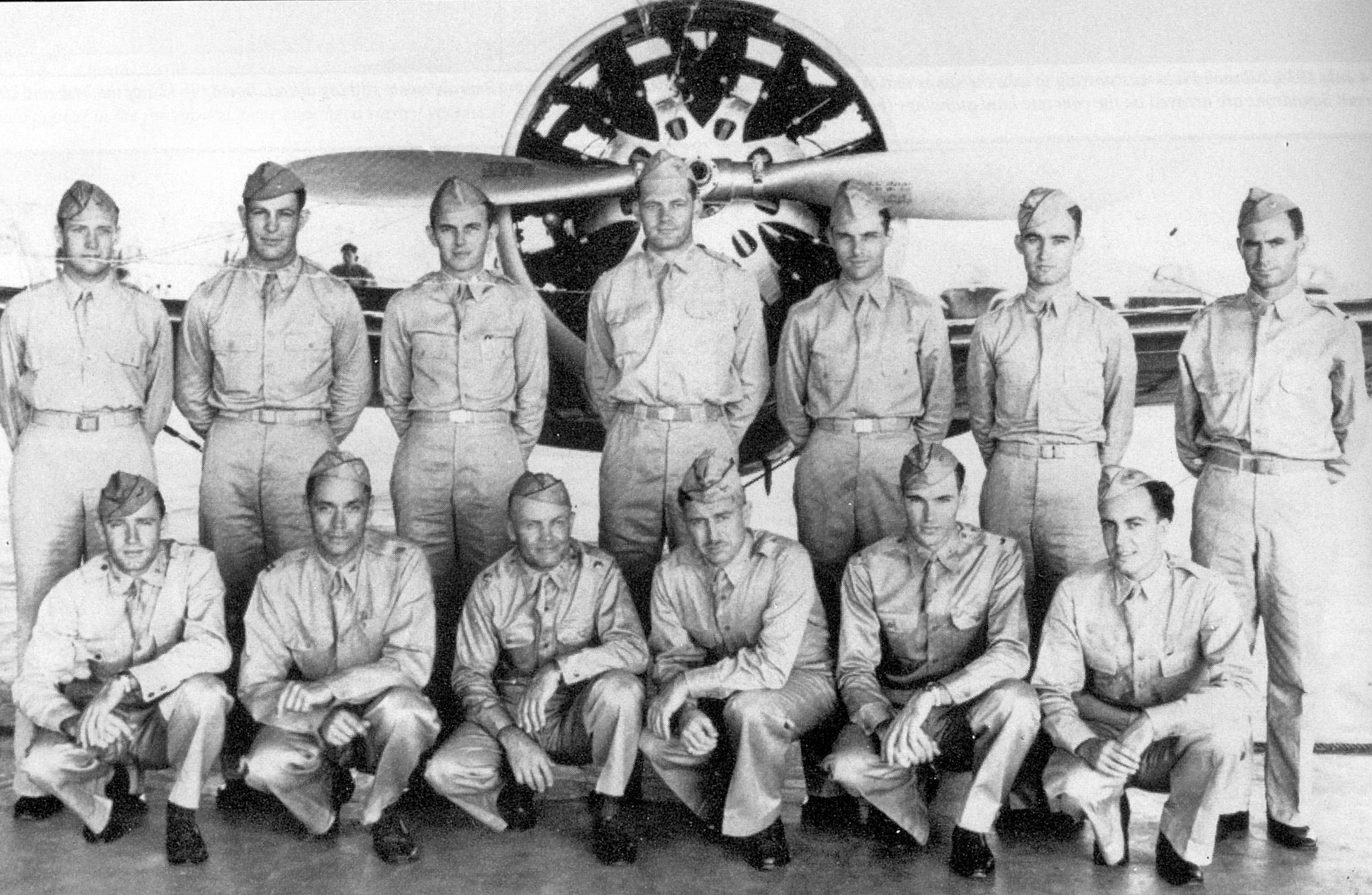
Pilots of the 37th Pursuit Group, Albrook Field, Panama, 1941 in front of a Boeing P-26.

Like other newly formed units in the buildup of the Army Air Corps prior to the United States entrance into World War II, the 37th Pursuit Group was equipped with a mixture of hand-me-down aircraft which was transferred from existing units both in the Canal Zone as well as from the United States. It was assigned 25 Boeing P-26A Peashooters; two North American BC-1 trainers and two Northrop A-17 attack aircraft. The Group was one of the first Caribbean Air Force units to be placed on "Readiness" alert between 23 February and 1 March 1941 from 05:00–18:00 daily.

In May 1941, the 37th was equipped with one of only five Sikorsky OA-8 amphibian aircraft, and also received about 35 new Curtiss P-40B and P-40C fighters assigned to the Canal Zone. The receipt of the Warhawks allowed the 37th to transfer its obsolete P-26As to the 32d Pursuit Group and its OA-8 to the air base support squadron at France Field. With its new aircraft, the 37th achieved operational readiness by the end of the summer of 1941. It also received some new P-40Es

After the Pearl Harbor Attack in Hawaii, the Caribbean Air Force units in the Canal Zone were dispersed, and some aircraft of the group were sent to La Chorrera Field, Panama. A realignment of defense units was completed in early 1942, and the 37th Pursuit Group was assigned to the Panama Region, VI Interceptor Command, Sixth Air Force. On 1 May 1942, the Group dispatched five P-40Cs to Waller Field, Trinidad to provide air defense. The detachment returned to Albrook on 22 June, by which time the unit had been redesignated the 37th Fighter Group.

The Group remained at Albrook Field until October 1942, when it was moved to Howard Field, although detachments were stationed both at Albrook and at Aguadulce Field, Panama until 31 October 1943 when the group was disbanded when the threat to the Panama Canal was perceived to be diminished; its personnel being returned to the United States for reassignment to other units.

=== Korean War ===
The 37th was reconstituted on 3 March 1953 as the United States Air Force 37th Fighter-Bomber Group as part of the buildup on the Air Force due to the Korean War, assigned to the new 37th Fighter-Bomber Wing and was activated on 8 April 1953 at Clovis AFB, New Mexico. Although activated, the group was neither manned nor equipped and it was inactivated on 25 June.

==== Stealth fighters ====
After the Gulf War of 1991, the 37th Tactical Fighter Wing was redesignated the 37th Fighter Wing on 1 October 1991 and reorganized under the Objective Wing model. As a result, the group was reactivated to control its operational components, as the 37th Operations Group the following month. However, the group's base, Tonopah Airport, was adequate for testing and development of aircraft, but it was unsuitable as a fully operational base. As a result, plans were put in place to construct suitable facilities for the F-117A at Holloman Air Force Base, New Mexico. On 8 July 1992, the assets of the group moved to Holloman and the group was inactivated.

== Lineage ==
- Constituted as the 37th Pursuit Group (Interceptor) on 22 December 1939

Activated 1 February 1940.
Redesignated 37th Fighter Group on 15 May 1942.
Disbanded on 1 November 1943.

- Redesignated 37th Fighter-Bomber Group on 3 March 1953.

Activated on 8 April 1953.
Inactivated on 25 June 1953.

- Redesignated 37th Tactical Fighter Group on 19 September 1985 (remained inactive)
- Redesignated 37th Operations Group

Activated on 1 November 1991
Inactivated on 8 July 1992

=== Assignments ===
- 12th Pursuit Wing, c. 1 February 1940 – 6 March 1942
- Panama Canal Air Force (later Caribbean Air Force), 19 November 1940
- XXVI Fighter Command, 18 September 1942 – 1 November 1943
- 37th Fighter-Bomber Wing, 8 April – 25 June 1953
- 37th Fighter Wing, 1 October 1991 – 8 July 1992

=== Components ===
- 28th Fighter Squadron: 1 February 1940 – 1 November 1943
- 30th Fighter Squadron (later 30th Fighter-Bomber Squadron): 1 February 1940 – 1 November 1943; 28 April – 25 June 1953
- 31st Fighter Squadron: 1 February 1940 – 1 November 1943
- 37th Operations Support Squadron: 1 November 1991 – 8 July 1992
- 415th Fighter Squadron: 1 November 1991 – 8 July 1992
- 416th Fighter Squadron: 1 November 1991 – 8 July 1992
- 417th Fighter Squadron: 1 November 1991 – 8 July 1992

=== Stations ===
- Albrook Field, Panama Canal Zone, 1 February 1940 – October 1942
- Howard Field, Panama Canal Zone, October 1942–1 November 1943
- Clovis Air Force Base, New Mexico, 28 April 1953 – 25 June 1953
- Tonopah Test Range Airport, Nevada, 1 November 1992 – 8 July 1992

=== Aircraft ===
- Curtiss P-40 Warhawk (1940–1943)
- F-100 Super Sabre (1967–1969)
- F-117 Nighthawk (1991–1992)
- T-38 Talon (1991–1992)

=== Awards and campaigns ===
| Award streamer | Award | Dates | Notes |
|---|---|---|---|
| | Air Force Outstanding Unit Award | 1 November 1991-15 March 1992 | 37th Operations Group |

| Campaign Streamer | Campaign | Dates | Notes |
|---|---|---|---|
| | American Theater | 7 December 1941 – 1 November 1943 | 37th Pursuit Group |
