= Cap. Alex H. Bosquez Airport =

Airport in Panama

Calzada Larga Airport
- IATA: none; ICAO: MPCL; LID: MP23

Summary
- Airport type: Public
- Operator: AAC
- Serves: Caimitillo, Panama
- Elevation AMSL: 394 ft (120 m)
- Coordinates: 9°10′00″N 79°32′43″W

Map
- Location in Panama

Runways
Direction	Length		Surface
Direction	m	ft	Surface
18/36	1,191	3,907	Asphalt
- Source: GCM WAD

Calzada Larga Airport is a general aviation airport serving Caimitillo, a town in the Panamá Province of Panama.

== History ==
During World War II the facility was used as part of the defense of the Panama Canal. The USAAF XXVI Fighter Command 29th Fighter Squadron used the airfield from 17 May 1942 – 25 March 1944, flying A-24 Dauntless dive bombers. The squadron flew antisubmarine patrols from the field. In addition various Air Commando units from Albrook Field used the airfield flying training missions with CG-4A Waco gliders and P-51 Mustangs.

== See also ==
- Transport in Panama
- List of airports in Panama
