= Poncri Auxiliary Aerodrome =

Former airport in Panama

- IATA: none; ICAO: none

Summary
- Airport type: Public
- Location: Panama
- Coordinates: 08°13′39″N 080°33′47″W

Map
- Location in Panama

Poncri Auxiliary Aerodrome is a former airport in Panama.

During World War II the airfield was used by the United States Army Air Forces Sixth Air Force as an auxiliary of Howard Field as part of the defense of the Panama Canal. Known as Pocri Airfield, the XXVI Fighter Command 28th Fighter Squadron flew P-39 Airacobras from the airfield from 22 February – 2 August 1944.

The airfield has been overbuilt with housing.
