= La Chorrera Army Airfield =

Former airfield in Panama

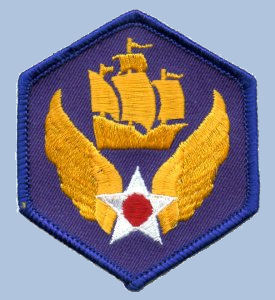
La Chorrera Army Airfield
- Part of Sixth Air Force
- Located in Panama

Site information
- Type: Military airfield
- Controlled by: United States Army Air Forces

Location
- Coordinates: 08°52′30.57″N 079°47′15.09″W

La Chorrera Army Airfield is a former United States Army Air Forces World War II air base on Panama. It was a sub-base of Albrook Field and later Howard Field which used for dispersal and overflow units as part of the defense of the Panama Canal.

Units assigned to the field were:

- 30th Pursuit (later Fighter) Squadron (37th Fighter Group), 24 November 1941 – 3 January 1943 (P-40 Warhawk)
- 31st Pursuit (later Fighter) Squadron (37th Fighter Group), 9–23 December 1941; 3 February-19 May 1942 (P-40 Warhawk)
- 24th Fighter Squadron (16th Fighter Group), 15 March–September 1942; 10Jan-28 May 1943 (P-39 Airacobra)
- 28th Fighter Squadron (37th Fighter Group),26 March-2 May 1942 (P-40 Warhawk)
- 15th Fighter Squadron (53d Fighter Group), 2 January-10 November 1942 (P-39 Airacobra)
- 53d Fighter Squadron (32d Fighter Group), 7 January-8 June 1943 (P-40 Warhawk)
- 43d Fighter Squadron (XXVI Fighter Command), 6 April-29 August 1944 (P-39 Airacobra)
