= Scarlett Martínez International Airport =

Airport in Panama

Scarlett Martínez International Airport Rio Hato Airport
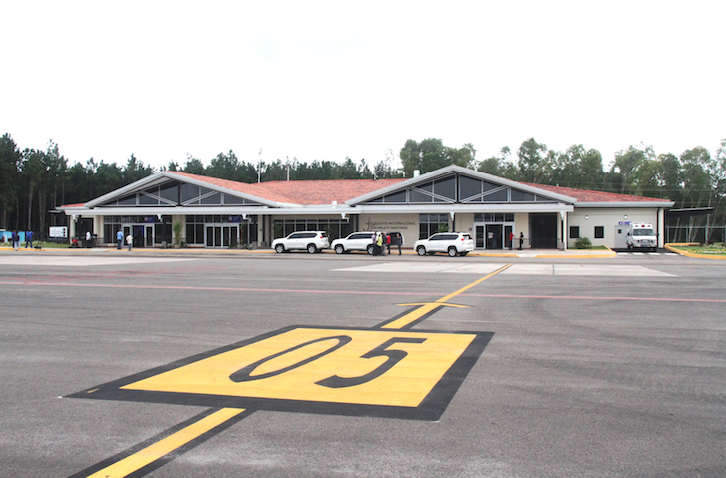
- Terminal building seen from the runway

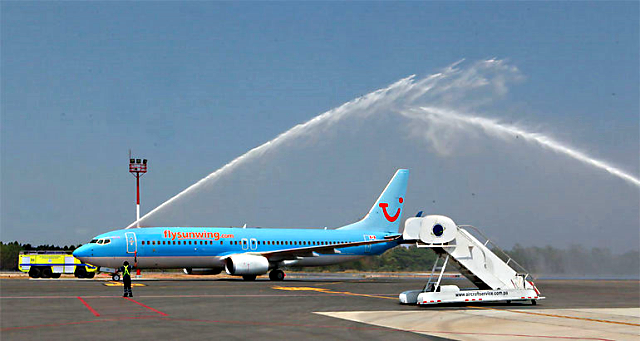
- Sunwing Airlines inaugural flight, 2015
- IATA: RIH; ICAO: MPSM

Summary
- Airport type: Public
- Serves: Rio Hato, Panama
- Elevation AMSL: 121 ft (37 m)
- Coordinates: 8°22′33″N 80°07′40″W

Map
- Location in Rio Hato Airport

Runways
Direction	Length		Surface
Direction	m	ft	Surface
17/35	2,450	8,038	Asphalt
- Source: GCM SkyVector

Scarlett Martínez International Airport (IATA: RIH, ICAO: MPSM), also known as Río Hato Airport, is an international airport serving Río Hato, a town in the Coclé Province of Panama. The airport is 3 kilometres (2 mi) east of Río Hato.

== International airport ==
In 2011 the government of Panama gave the order to proceed with a project to rebuild the airport. The restoration work included rehabilitation of the runway and airport terminal, and construction of a tunnel for the Pan-American Highway, which previously crossed the runway. The $53.2 million project was awarded through a public bidding process. The project was supervised by the Ministry of Public Works (MOP) and the Civil Aviation Authority (CAA) and lasted 14 months.

President Ricardo Martinelli said the new Scarlett Martínez Airport at Río Hato would bring benefits and opportunities for area residents. The airport would allow Panama City's Tocumen International Airport to accept more flights for business and connecting flights in an effort to secure Panama's position as a hub for business and commercial activity in the region. It will serve to boost tourism along the Pacific beaches of Panama, where several beach resorts and condo developments are located. President Martinelli confirmed that the airport would be used by charter companies from the United States, Canada, and Europe. The airport was officially opened by President Martinelli on 13 November 2013.

== Airlines and destinations ==
Airlines	Destinations
Air Transat	Seasonal: Montreal–Trudeau, Québec City (begins December 20, 2026), Toronto–Pearson
Arrendamientos Aéreos	Charter: Panama City-Albrook
WestJet	Seasonal: Montreal–Trudeau
Wingo	Bogotá

== History ==
=== Río Hato Army Air Base ===
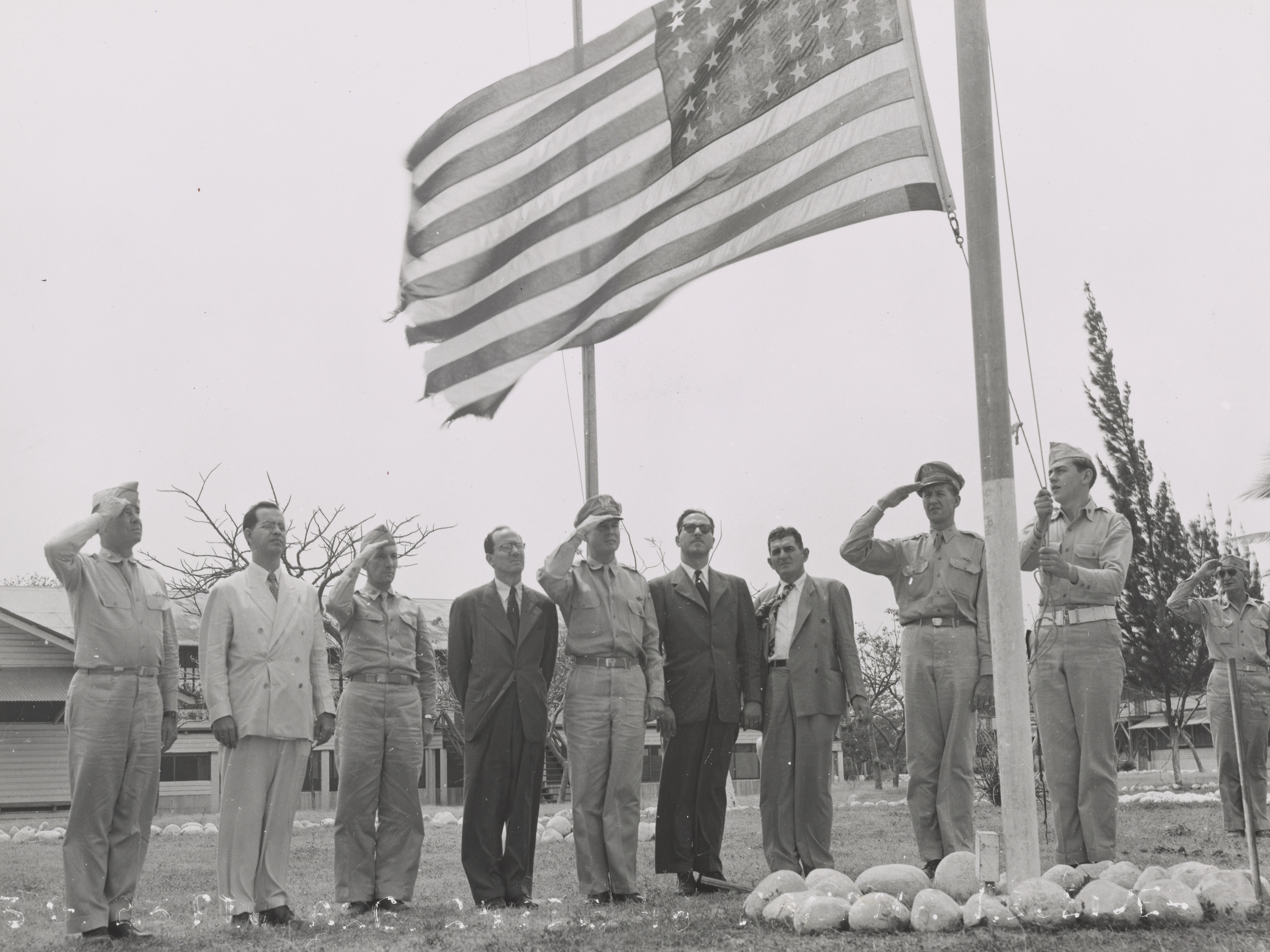
U. S. Army Air Force Rio Hato Airfield, return ceremony to the Republic of Panama on February 24, 1948

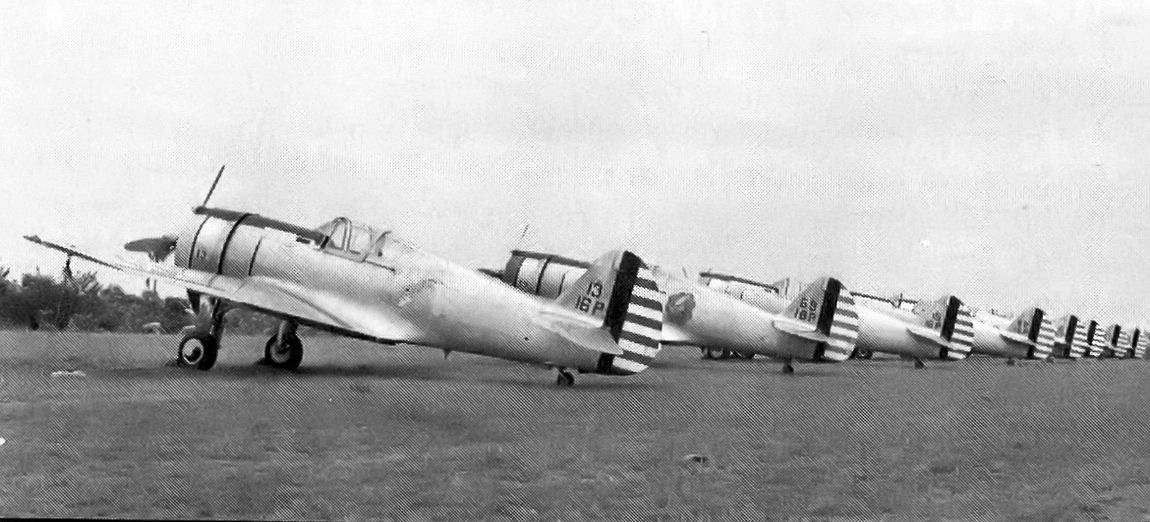
24th Pursuit Squadron with eight Curtiss P-36A Hawks at Rio Hato Airfield in 1939

Established in 1931, during World War II Río Hato Army Air Base was used by the United States Army Air Forces Sixth Air Force as part of the defense of the Panama Canal. It was closed as an active Air Force facility in 1948 but was used as an USAF auxiliary military landing field as late as 1990 as part of Howard Air Force Base.

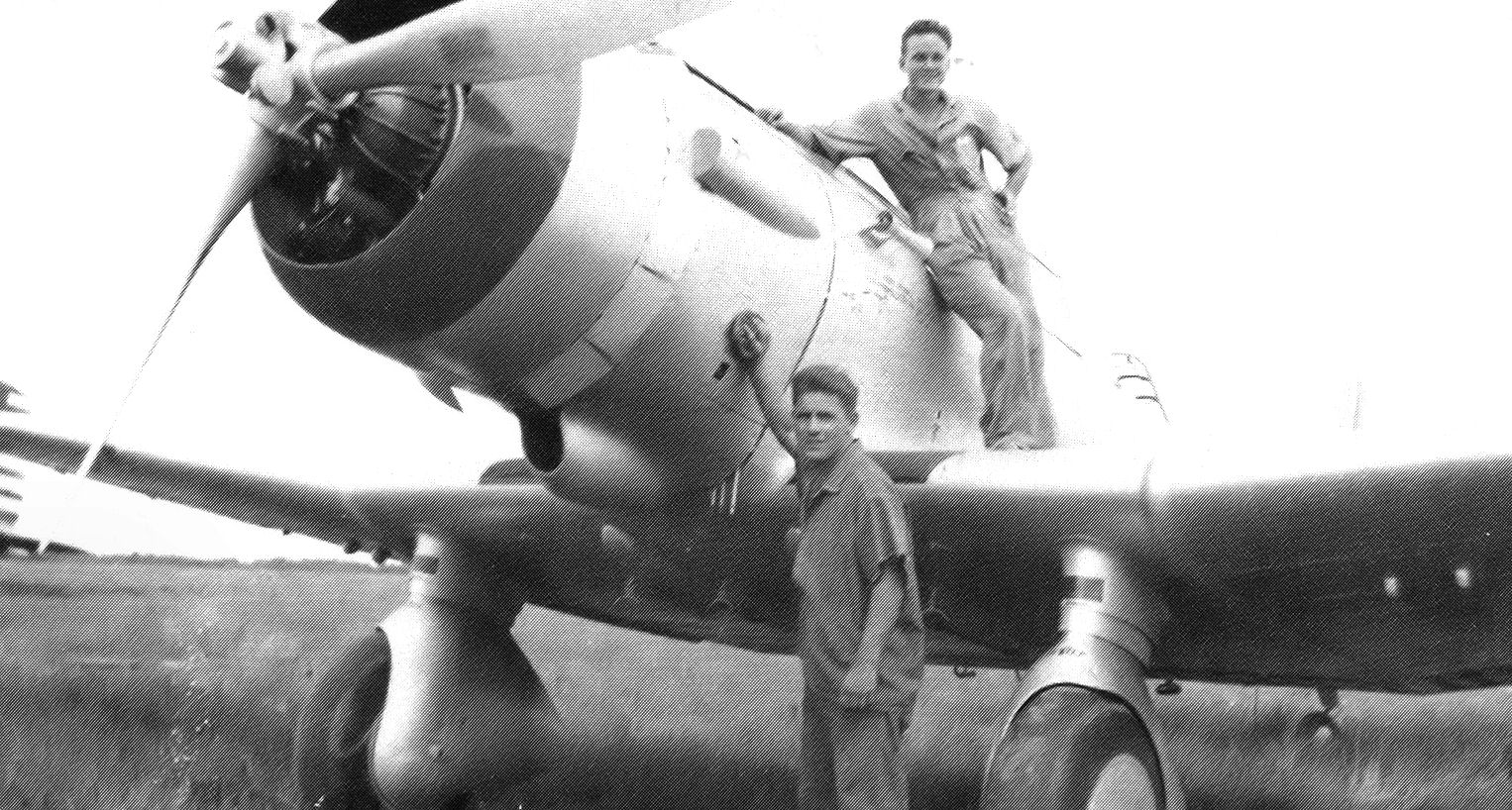
74th Attack Squadron personnel with Northrup A-17 in 1939

Units assigned to the base were:

- 28th Pursuit Squadron (37th Pursuit Group), 5 October – 13 November 1940 (Boeing P-26 Peashooter)
- 30th Pursuit Squadron (37th Pursuit Group), 5 October – 13 November 1940 (Boeing P-26 Peashooter)
- 31st Pursuit Squadron (37th Pursuit Group), 5 October – 13 November 1940 (Boeing P-26 Peashooter)
- 1st Bombardment Squadron (9th Bombardment Group), 13 November 1940 – 24 April 1941 (B-18 Bolo)
- 5th Bombardment Squadron (9th Bombardment Group), 13 November 1940 – 28 September 1941 (B-18 Bolo)
- 99th Bombardment Squadron (9th Bombardment Group), 13 November 1940 – 3 December 1941 (B-18 Bolo)
- 59th Bombardment Squadron (9th Bombardment Group) 1 January – 28 October 1941 (A-20 Havoc)
- Headquarters, 32d Pursuit Group, 1 January – 9 December 1941

51st Pursuit Squadron, 21 August – 10 December 1941 (Boeing P-26 Peashooter, Curtiss P-36 Hawk)
52d Pursuit Squadron, 21 August 1941 – 23 March 1944 (P-40 Warhawk, P-39 Airacobra)
53d Pursuit Squadron, 21 August – 12 December 1941 (Boeing P-26 Peashooter, Curtiss P-36 Hawk)

- 4th Tactical Reconnaissance Squadron (Caribbean Air Command), 20 August 1946 – 1 December 1947 (CQ-3, PQ-14)
- 414th Fighter Squadron (6th Fighter Wing) 24 March – 1 September 1947 (P-61 Black Widow)
- 319th Fighter Squadron (6th Fighter Wing) 1 September 1947 – 14 January 1948 (P-61 Black Widow)
- Headquarters, 6th Bombardment Group, 9 December 1941 – 14 January 1943

3d Bombardment Squadron

8 December 1941 – 4 May 1942 (B-18 Bolo)
26 August – 8 December 1944; 19 October 1945 – 1 November 1946 (B-24 Liberator)

25th Bombardment Squadron, 8 December 1941 – 21 January 1942 (B-18 Bolo)
74th Bombardment Squadron

11 December 1941 – 9 January 1942 (B-18 Bolo)
7–21 August 1944; 1 May 1945 – 1 November 1946 (B-24 Liberator)

- 108th Reconnaissance Squadron (72d Observation Group) 14–19 January 1942 (B-18 Bolo)
- 395th Bombardment Squadron (40th, 6th Bombardment Groups) 17 June 1942 – 16 June 1943 (Northrup A-17 Nomad, B-24 Liberator)
- 396th Bombardment Squadron (VI Bomber Command)

4 May 1943 – 7 April 1944 (B-17 Flying Fortress, B-24 Liberator)
6 February 1945 – 1 November 1946 (B-24 Liberator)

- 397th Bombardment Squadron (6th Bombardment Group, VI Bomber Command)

4 May 1943 – 7 April 1944
6 February 1945 – 1 November 1946

- 25th Bombardment Squadron (VI Bomber Command), 9 September – 8 December 1944; 27 January – 26 April 1945; October 1945 – 1 November 1946 B-24 Liberator

=== Operation Just Cause ===
During Operation Just Cause, The United States Army 2d and 3d Battalions, 75th Ranger Regiment (TF RED ROMEO), departed Lawson Army Airfield, Fort Benning, Georgia, at 18:00 on 19 December 1989. Its mission was to seize Río Hato and neutralize the 6th and 7th PDF Infantry Cos. At 01:00 on 20 December, the battalion jumped from C-130s onto the airfield at Río Hato. Both PDF companies had been alerted and fired on the C-130s with small arms and anti-aircraft guns. Despite PDF resistance, the battalion assembled, attacked the barracks, and established an airhead. By morning, the Rangers had accomplished all missions, captured 250 prisoners, and cleared the airfield for future operations.

Río Hato was also the first combat target for the US Air Force F-117 Nighthawk stealth fighter during Operation Just Cause. On 19 December 1989, a flight of eight F-117s lifted off from Tonopah Test Range Airport, Nevada. Their target was a large open field beside barracks housing two companies of troops belonging to Battalion 2000, an elite unit known to be fiercely loyal to Panamanian dictator Manuel Noriega. The plan was for the aircraft to drop two large 2,000-pound Mark 84 bombs, colloquially known as "the Hammer" close enough to the buildings to stun the sleeping soldiers so that they could not respond to the nearby nighttime parachute landings by the 2nd Ranger Battalion and elements of the 3rd Battalion. The bombs were fused to detonate after they had penetrated a few feet of earth, with the intention that they would not cause many casualties.

However, as the two F-117As approached their target, the wind changed direction. Moreover, a last-minute change in the attack plan and confused communications resulted in the first pilot dropping his bomb where the second was to strike. The other pilot, thinking the attack had reverted to the original plan, dropped his bomb 325 yards wide.

== See also ==
- Transport in Panama
- List of airports in Panama
