= 30th Fighter-Bomber Squadron =

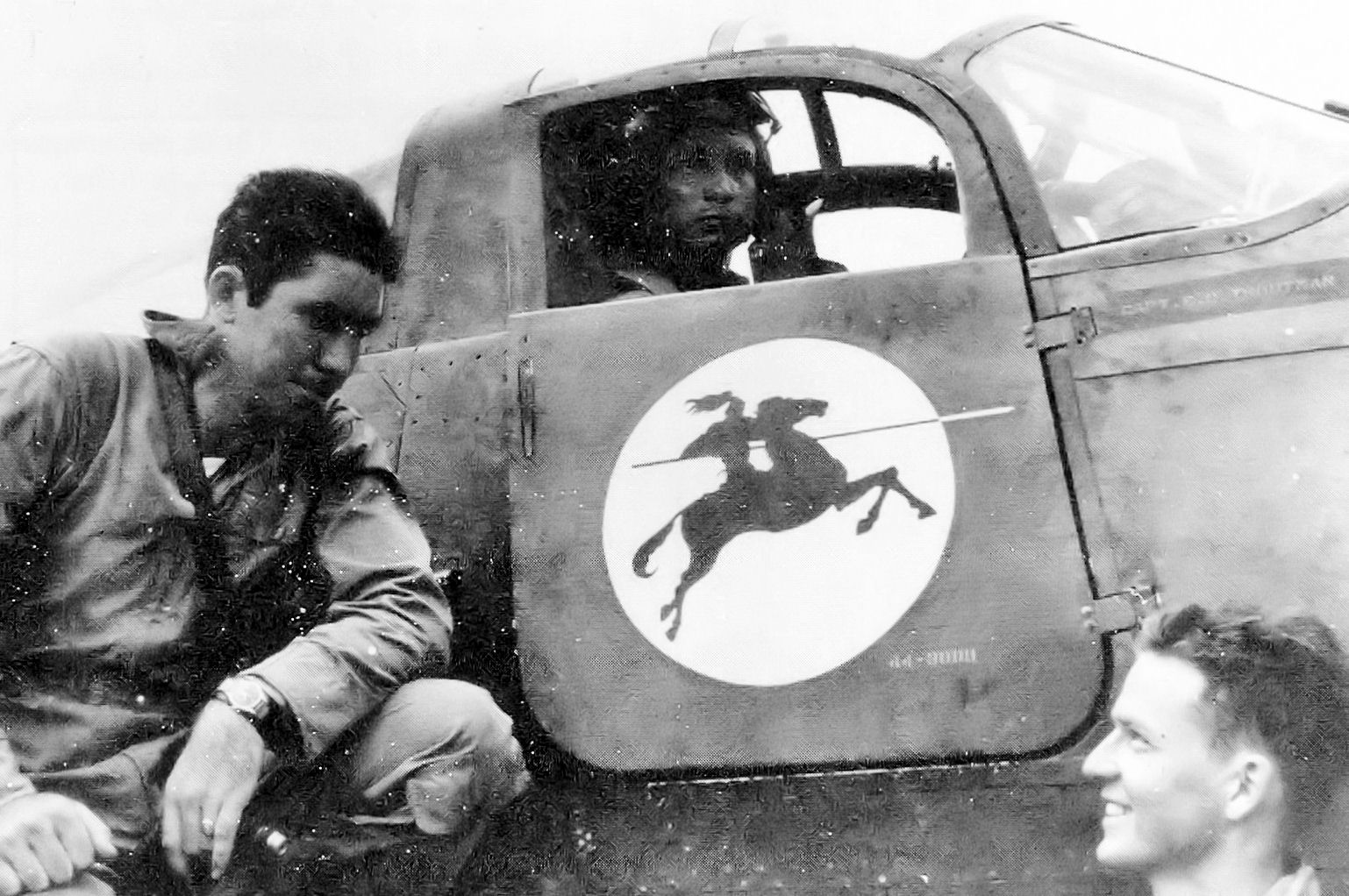
- 30th Fighter Squadron Bell P-39Q-20-BE Airacobra 44-3089 showing the squadrons new emblem. Howard Field, Canal Zone, early 1945
- Active: 1940–1953
- Country: United States
- Branch: United States Air Force
- Role: Fighter-Bomber

The 30th Fighter-Bomber Squadron is an inactive United States Air Force unit. Its last assignment was with the 37th Fighter-Bomber Wing, based at Clovis Army Airfield, New Mexico. It was inactivated on 25 June 1953.

== History ==
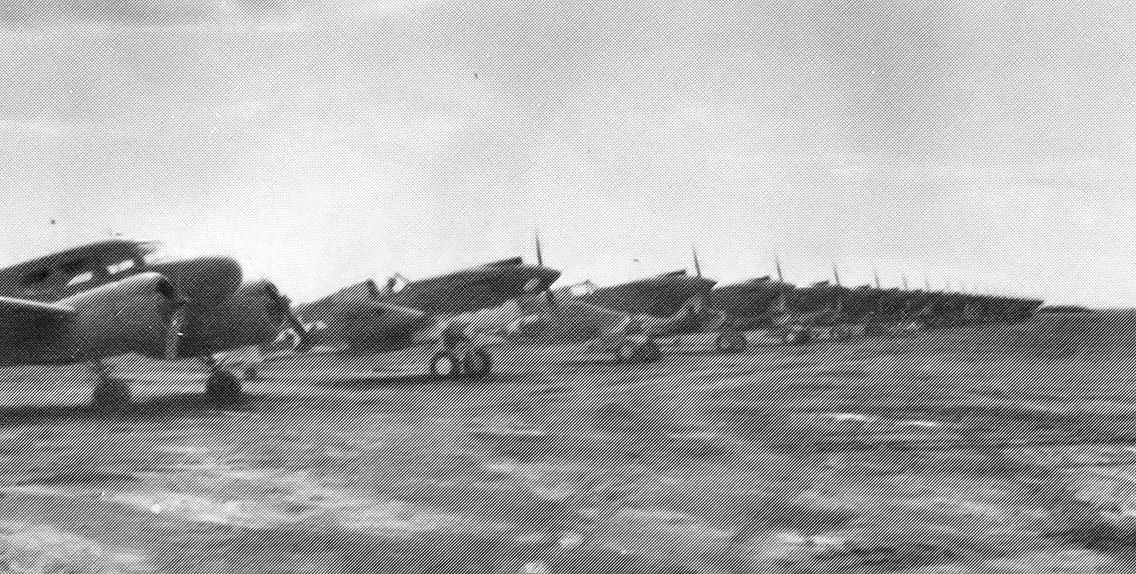
30th Fighter Squadron P-40 Warhawks, Aguadulce Army Airfield, Panama 1943. Note the single Cessna UC-78 twin engine trainer on the flightline.

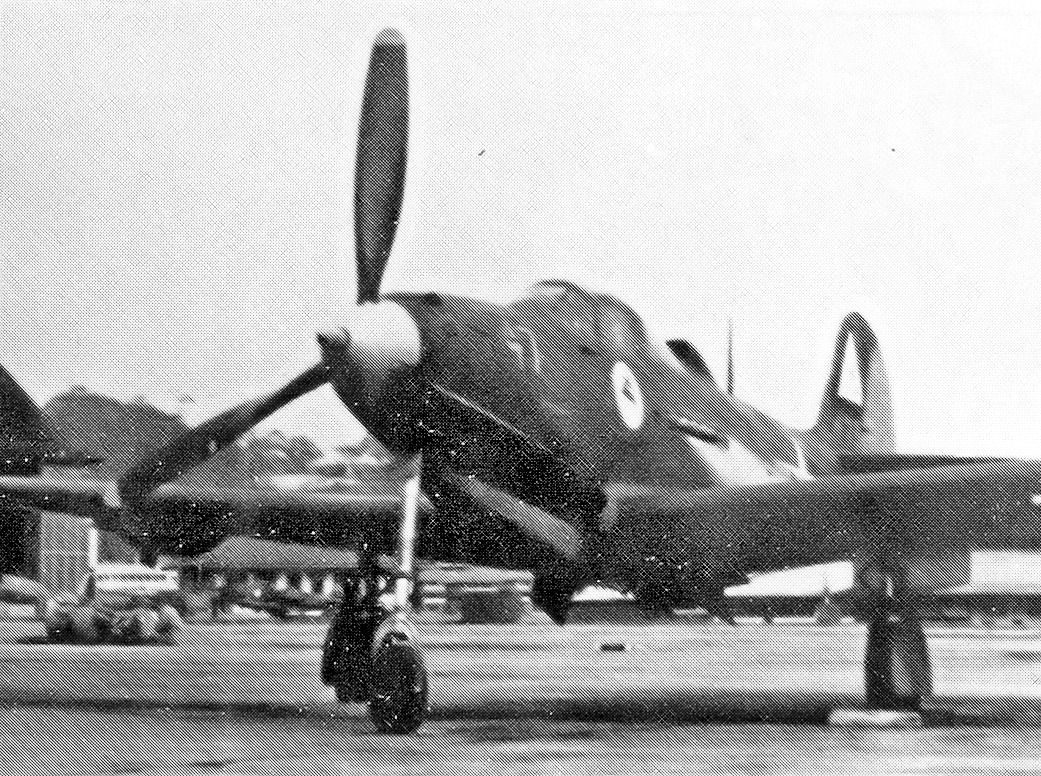
30th Fighter Squadron P-39Q – #47 at Panama Air Depot, Albrook Field, Panama Canal Zone, March 1945

Established in 1939 as the 30th Pursuit Squadron and activated on 1 February 1940 at Albrook Field, Panama Canal Zone. This unit was part of the build-up of the Canal Zone's defenses as war approached. Initially equipped with Boeing P-26A Peashooters, the mission of the squadron was air defense of the Panama Canal. The Squadron was briefly moved to Rio Hato Field on 5 October 1940 and, following a month there, returned to Albrook on 13 November, where it remained until 24 November 1941.

However, as Albrook became more and more crowded with new units, the Squadron was transferred to La Chorrera Army Airfield, Panama on 24 November 1941 where it was equipped with modern Curtiss P-40 Warhawks. The unit shared the base with the 31st Pursuit Squadron at the time. Like all other fighter units in the USAAF, the squadron was redesignated as the 30th Fighter Squadron on 15 May 1942 and, briefly, returned to Albrook, but reverted to Chorrera Field #1 on 1 June 1942. The Squadron remained them until 5 January 1943, when it transferred to Anton Army Airfield, Panama. However, all squadron personnel were reassigned to the 53d Fighter Squadron at France Field.

The squadron was re-manned at Anton Field with new personnel, then moved to Aguadulce Field, Panama in February 1943. It was reclassified as an Operational Training Unit (OTU), and its mission was changed to preparing new fighter pilots for duty in the tropical conditions of the Panama Canal Zone. In effect, the 30th Fighter Squadron had switched places with the 53d Fighter Squadron, and inherited 28 aircraft, being mixed models of the Curtiss P-40s, most of which had seen hard service in Puerto Rico and the Antilles Air Command previously. The Squadron also had small detachments at Albrook Field and Corozal in the Canal Zone and, by October, another detachment was maintained at Howard Field as well.

With the dissolution of its parent 37th Fighter Group, the Squadron was assigned directly to the XXVI Fighter Command from 1 November 1943. Although still classified as an OTU, the squadron did mount some air defense patrols. The Squadron also had the unique distinction, in keeping with its OTU role, to be selected to train the cadre of the 1st Brazilian Fighter Squadron of the Brazilian Air Force, which went on to great achievements in Italy after equipping in the United States. with Republic P-47D Thunderbolts. Thus, at one point, when the concentration of Brazilians in the Squadron was quite high, it can be fairly said that the unit had the honor of being one of the only United States units to participate in the defense of the Panama Canal while being manned almost entirely by foreign pilots.

In January 1945, the Squadron surrendered its tired old P-40s to the Panama Air Depot and was reequipped with new Bell P-39Q Airacobras. In addition, the "official" unit insignia (a black knight in armor, lance in hand, seated on a plunging horse in a white circle background) had finally been approved (officially, on 26 June 1945, although it is known to have been painted on some aircraft much earlier, see infobox). By June 1945, the Squadron had been completely reequipped with Lockheed P-38L Lightnings.

However, no sooner had conversion to the P-38's been completed than the unit was moved to Howard Field, where the entire complement of P-38s was hangared and the unit activities ran down with the end of the war in Europe. The squadron ceased all flying activities in June, and the P-38s were stored in a hangar at Howard. By October 1945, the squadron was reduced to a non-operational administrative organization. Inactivated on 15 October 1946.

During the Cold War, the squadron was reactivated by Tactical Air Command as the 30th Fighter-Bomber Squadron at Clovis AFB, New Mexico on 8 April 1953 and was programmed to receive F-86F Sabres. However, it was neither manned or equipped due to personnel and equipment shortages and was inactivated on 25 June.

=== Lineage ===
- Constituted 30th Pursuit Squadron (Interceptor) on 22 December 1939

Activated on 1 February 1940
Redesignated 30 Fighter Squadron on 15 May 1942
Inactivated on 15 October 1946

- Redesignated 30th Fighter-Bomber Squadron on 3 March 1953

Activated on 8 April 1953
Inactivated on 25 June 1953.

=== Assignments ===
- 37th Pursuit (later Fighter) Group, 1 February 1940
- XXVI Fighter Command, 1 November 1943
- 6th Fighter Wing, 25 August-15 October 1946
- 37th Fighter-Bomber Group, 8 April-25 June 1953.

=== Stations ===
- Albrook Field, Canal Zone, 1 February 1940
- Rio Hato AAB, Panama, 5 October 1940
- Albrook Field, Canal Zone, 13 November 1940
- La Chorrera AAF, Panama, 24 November 1941
- Anton AAF, Panama, 3 January 1943
- Aguadulce AAF, Panama, 10 February 1943
- Howard Field, Canal Zone, 25 January 1945 – 15 October 1946
- Clovis AFB, New Mexico, 8 April-25 June 1953.

=== Aircraft ===
- P-26 Peashooter, 1940–1941
- P-40 Warhawk, 1940–1945
- P-39 Airacobra, 1944–1945
- P-38 Lightning, 1945–1946
- P-47 Thunderbolt, 1946.
