= 29th Test and Evaluation Squadron =

29th Test and Evaluation Squadron

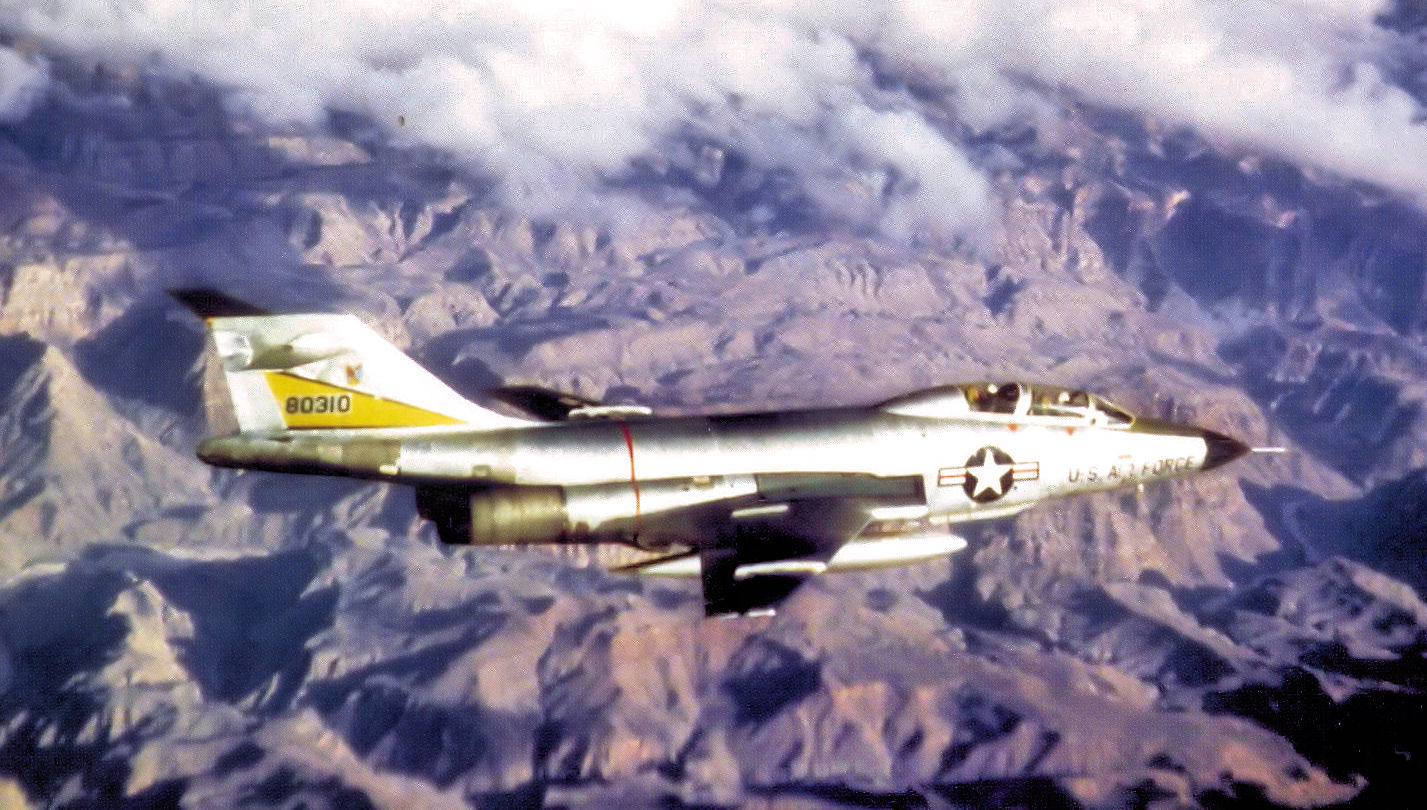
- 29th Fighter-Interceptor Squadron McDonnell F-101B Voodoo near Malmstrom AFB March 1964 (Note: Aircraft is McDonnell F-100B-110-MC VooDoo, serial 58-0310. It was transferred to the Minnesota Air National Guard in 1975 and to the Aerospace Maintenance and Regeneration Center on 19 December 1975. Baugher, Joe (21 April 2023). "1958 USAF Serial Numbers". Joe Baugher.)
- Active: 1918–1919; 1923–1944; 1944–1946; 1953–1968; 1993–present
- Country: United States
- Branch: United States Air Force
- Role: Test and evaluation
- Part of: Air Combat Command
- Garrison/HQ: Eglin Air Force Base
- Decorations: Air Force Outstanding Unit Award; Air Force Organizational Excellence Award

Insignia
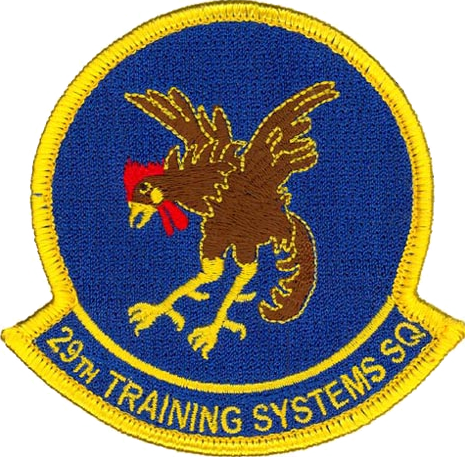
- 29th Training Systems Squadron emblem (Note: Modified 11 January 2016.)

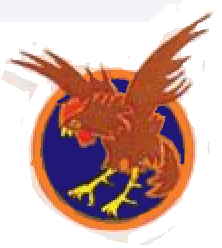
- 29th Pursuit Squadron emblem (Note: Approved 15 March 1935. Heraldic Description: On and over a blue disc bordered golden yellow a gamecock in the position of attack (body, head, neck, wings, and feathers, brown; legs, feet, beak, and eyes, yellow; comb and wattles, red). Maurer, Combat Squadrons, p. 146.)

The 29th Test and Evaluation Squadron is an active United States Air Force unit. It is assigned to the 753d Test and Evaluation Group, at Eglin Air Force Base, Florida.

The squadron is one of the oldest in the United States Air Force, its origins dating to October 1918, when its first predecessor was organized as the 29th Aero Squadron at Camp Knox, Kentucky, where it supported a field artillery unit until it was demobilized in September 1919.

The second predecessor of the unit was activated in October 1933 as the 29th Pursuit Squadron in the Panama Canal Zone. The two squadrons were consolidated in 1935. The squadron became the 29th Fighter Squadron in 1942 and served in the Caribbean area until 1944, when the diminishing threat in the area led to its withdrawal to the United States. In July 1944, it became one of the first jet fighter units in the Army Air Forces, when it began testing Bell P-59 Airacomets. It was inactivated in July 1946 and its personnel and equipment transferred to another unit.

In 1953, the squadron was reactivated as the 29th Fighter-Interceptor Squadron, serving in an air defense role in California and Montana until inactivating in 1968. It was activated at Eglin in 1993 as the 29th Training Systems Squadron

== Mission ==
The 29th Test and Evaluation Squadron has personnel located at Eglin Air Force Base, Florida and 11 geographically separated units around the nation: Barksdale Air Force Base, Louisiana; Beale Air Force Base, California; Creech Air Force Base, Nevada; Dyess Air Force Base, Texas; Hill Air Force Base, Utah; Offutt Air Force Base, Nebraska; Robins Air Force Base, Georgia; Tinker Air Force Base, Oklahoma; Tyndall Air Force Base, Florida and Whiteman Air Force Base, Missouri as well as an operating location in Mesa, Arizona.

The squadron serves as the combat air force's center of expertise for aircrew training devices. Squadron personnel provide technical expertise on all aspects of ATD life-cycle management, including acquisition, modification, acceptance testing and certification testing for all A-10, B-1, B-2, B-52, E-3, E-4, E-8, EC-130, F-15C/E, F-16, F-22, F-35, HH-60, HC-130, MQ-1/9, RC-135, RQ-4 and U-2 ATDs.

Unit personnel also manage the CAF simulator certification program. The squadron's efforts incorporate ATD oversight and management from concept development and preliminary design review through sustainment and program deactivation.

== History ==
=== World War I ===
The first predecessor of the squadron was the 29th Aero Squadron, which was organized at Camp Knox, Kentucky, in the fall of 1918, shortly before the end of World War I. It was equipped with Curtiss JN-4 and Curtiss JN-6H aircraft, which it apparently operated from Camp Knox's airfield, Godman Field, as the aerial support unit for a field artillery brigade until it was demobilized in September 1919.

=== Panama Canal Zone ===
It was reactivated in the Panama Canal Zone at Albrook Field on 1 October 1933. On 6 December 1939, it was redesignated as the 29th Pursuit Squadron (Interceptor) and, between 1933 and 1939, had operated, in series, the Boeing P-12, Boeing P-26A Peashooter and Curtiss P-36A Hawk.

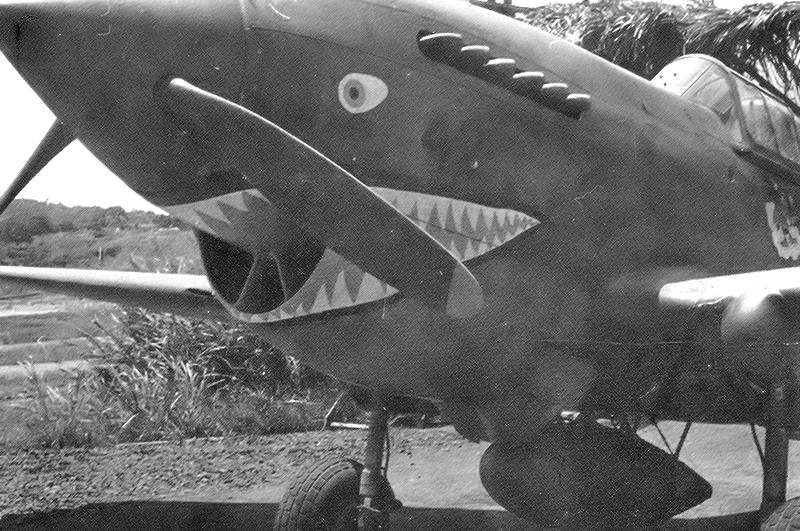
Curtiss P-40C Warhawk, May 1942, Madden Field, Panama. Squadron ID #42

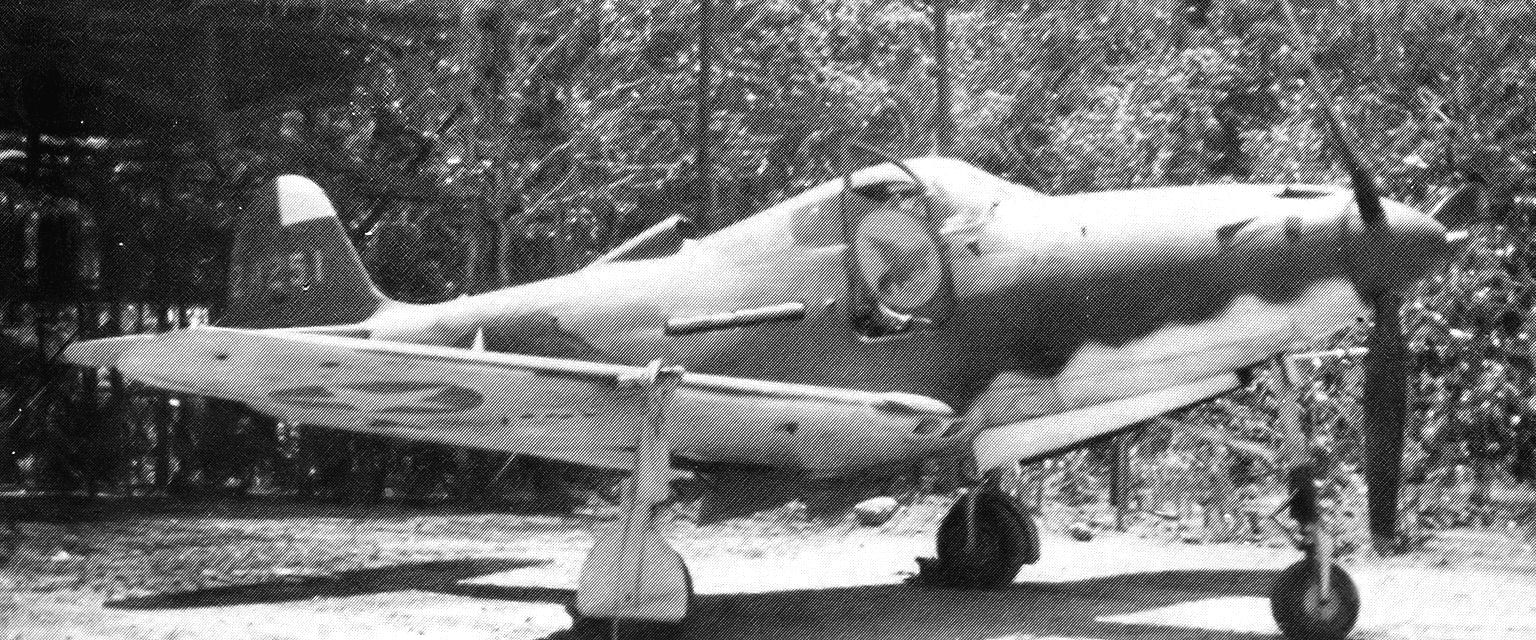
Bell P-39K-1-BE Airacobra 42-4251, Madden Field, Panama.

After the Pearl Harbor Attack, the squadron had nine new Curtiss P-40E Warhawks, one of the first Canal Zone units to receive the new fighters, although at least one P-40C was also on hand. The squadron was placed on general alert at 15:00, 7 December 1941, at which time all 10 P-40E's on hand were basically combat ready. Still at Albrook at the time, the unit later was the first to move to Calzada Larga Airfield, Panama (later named Madden Field). The unit was redesignated as the 29th Fighter Squadron on 15 May 1942.

On 29 August 1942, Flight "C" of the squadron was transferred from Madden to remote Talara Airport, Peru, to provide aerodrome defense for the installations there and was relieved there by "E" Flight by December (although this was redesignated as "0" Flight, 51st Fighter Squadron concurrently that month). By January 1943, with the main body still at Madden Field with 18 aircraft, the unit was starting conversion to Bell P-39K Airacobras. By October 1943, still at Madden Field, the squadron also had a flight detached to Aguadulce Army Airfield, Panama. Effective 1 November 1943, with the dissolution of the 16th Fighter Group, the squadron was subordinated directly to the XXVI Fighter Command.

=== Replacement training ===
The squadron continued on at Madden Field until 25 March 1944, when the unit moved to Lincoln Army Airfield, Nebraska, and being assigned to IV Fighter Command as a replacement training unit, flying predominantly Lockheed P-38 Lightnings.

The squadron was later assigned to California where it was assigned to perform testing of the Bell P-59 Airacomet and Lockheed P-80 Shooting Star jet aircraft based at Muroc Dry Lake (later Edwards Air Force Base). The early jets provided USAAF pilots and ground crews with valuable data about the difficulties and pitfalls involved in converting to jet aircraft. This information proved quite useful when more advanced jet fighters finally became available in quantity. The squadron later moved to several other airfields in California providing transition training to new jet pilots until being inactivated in July 1946.

=== Air Defense Command ===
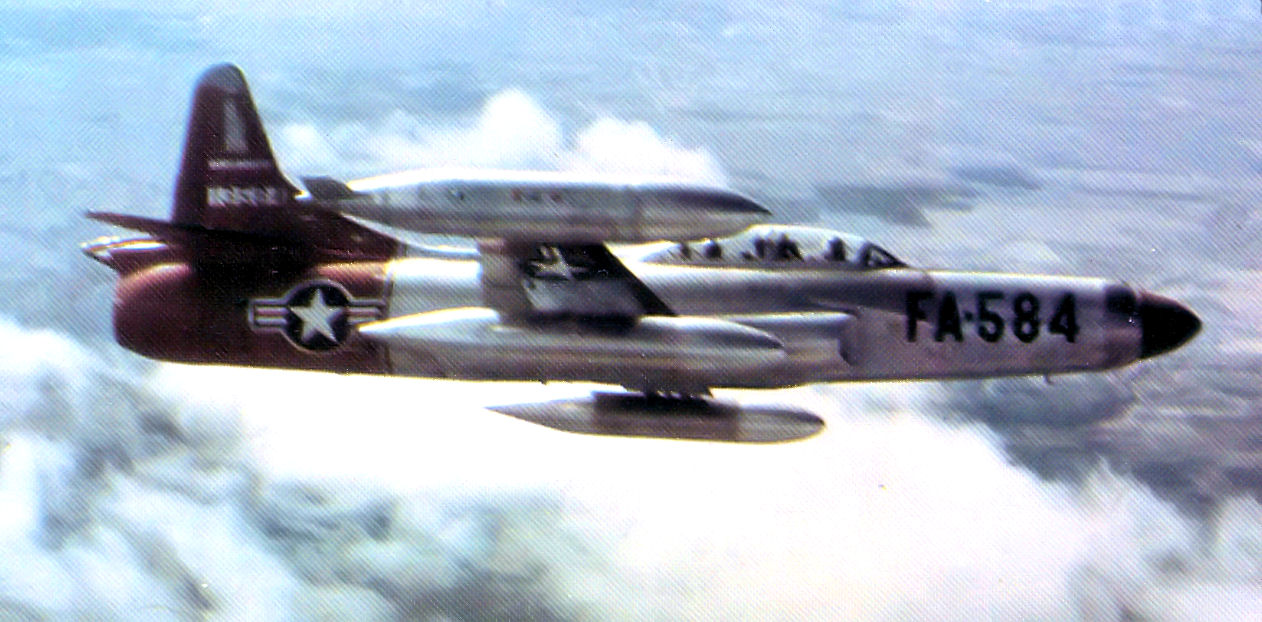
29th FIS F-94C Scorpion 51-3584 about 1955

It was reactivated in 1953 as part of Air Defense Command as an air defense squadron, and equipped with Lockheed F-94C Starfire day interceptors. It was assigned to Great Falls AFB, Montana with a mission for the air defense of the Upper Midwest region. It was re-equipped in 1957 with Northrop F-89H Scorpion Interceptor and later with the F-89J.

It received the new McDonnell F-101B Voodoo supersonic interceptor, and the F-101F operational and conversion trainer in 1960. The two-seat trainer version was equipped with dual controls, but carried the same armament as the F-101B and were fully combat-capable. On 22 October 1962, before President John F. Kennedy told Americans that missiles were in place in Cuba, the squadron dispersed one third of its force, equipped with nuclear tipped missiles to Billings Logan Field at the start of the Cuban Missile Crisis. These planes returned to Malmstrom after the crisis.

It was inactivated in July 1968 as part of the drawdown of ADC interceptor bases, and the aircraft were passed along to the Air National Guard.

== Lineage ==
29th Aero Squadron

- Organized as the 29th Aero Squadron on 10 October 1918 (Note: This squadron is not related to two older 29th Aero Squadrons. The first was organized at Camp Kelly, Texas on 16 July 1917 and redesignated 17th Aero Squadron on 30 July 1917. Maurer, Combat Squadrons, pp. 94–96. The second was activated at Kelly Field, Texas as the 502d Aero Squadron (Construction) in February 1918 and redesignated 29th Aero Squadron the same month. It moved to Brooks Field in March and was redesignated as Squadron A, Brooks Field, c. 27 June 1918 and was demobilized c. 14 November 1918. Mueller, pp. 53, 276.)

Demobilized 12 September 1919
Reconstituted on 5 March 1935 and consolidated with the 29th Pursuit Squadron as the 29th Pursuit Squadron

29th Test and Evaluation Squadron

- Constituted as the 29th Pursuit Squadron on 23 March 1924

Activated on 1 October 1933
Consolidated with the 29th Aero Squadron on 5 March 1935
Redesignated 29th Pursuit Squadron (Interceptor) on 6 December 1939
Redesignated 29th Fighter Squadron on 15 May 1942
Redesignated 29th Fighter Squadron (Single Engine) by 1943
Redesignated 29th Fighter Squadron, Single Engine on 20 August 1943
Inactivated on 25 May 1944

- Activated on 21 July 1944

Redesignated 29th Fighter Squadron, Jet Propelled on 18 January 1946
Inactivated on 3 July 1946

- Redesignated 29th Fighter-Interceptor Squadron on 23 March 1953

Activated on 8 November 1953
Discontinued and inactivated on 18 July 1968

- Redesignated 29th Training Systems Squadron on 9 April 1993
- Activated on 15 April 1993

Redesignated 29th Test and Evaluation Squadron on 16 February 2023

=== Assignments ===
- Post Headquarters, Brooks Field, 1918–1919
- 16th Pursuit Group (later Fighter Group), 1 October 1933
- XXVI Fighter Command, 1 November 1943
- Second Air Force, 8 April 1944 – 25 May 1944
- 412th Fighter Group, 21 July 1944 – 3 July 1946
- 29th Air Division, 8 November 1953
- Great Falls Air Defense Sector, 1 July 1960 – 1 July 1968
- 79th Test and Evaluation Group (later 53rd Test and Evaluation Group), 15 April 1993
- 53rd Test Management Group, 1 October 2002
- 753rd Test and Evaluation Group, 1 October 2021 – present

=== Stations ===
- Camp Knox (later Godman Field), Kentucky, 10 October 1918 – 12 September 1919
- Albrook Field, Panama Canal Zone, 1 October 1933
- Casa Larga Airfield, Panama, 17 May 1942 – 25 March 1944
- Lincoln Army Air Field, Nebraska, 8 April – 25 May 1944
- Palmdale Army Air Field, California, 21 July 1944
- Bakersfield Municipal Airport, California, 5 August 1944
- Oxnard Flight Strip, California, 9 September 1944
- Santa Maria Army Air Field, California, 10 July 1945
- March Field, California, 6 December 1945 – 3 July 1946
- Great Falls Air Force Base (later Malmstrom Air Force Base), Montana, 8 November 1953 – 1 July 1968
- Eglin Air Force Base, Florida, 15 April 1993 – present

=== Aircraft ===
- Curtiss JN-4, 1918–1919
- Curtiss JN-6H, 1918–1919
- Boeing P-12, 1933–1939
- Boeing P-26 Peashooter, 1933–1939
- Curtiss P-36 Hawk, 1939–1941
- Curtiss P-40 Warhawk, 1941–1944
- Bell P-39 Airacobra, 1942–1944
- North American A-36 Apache, 1944
- Bell P-63 Kingcobra, 1944
- Douglas A-24 Banshee, 1944–1945
- Lockheed P-38 Lightning, 1944–1945
- Bell P-59 Airacomet, 1944–1945
- North American P-51 Mustang, 1945–1946
- Lockheed P-80 Shooting Star, 1945–1946.
- Lockheed F-94C Starfire, 1953–1957
- Northrop F-89H Scorpion, 1957–1958
- Northrop F-89J Scorpion, 1958–1960
- McDonnell F-101B Voodoo, 1960–1968

== See also ==
- List of American aero squadrons
