= 31st Combat Training Squadron =

US Air Force unit

31st Combat Training Squadron Virtual Test and Training Center

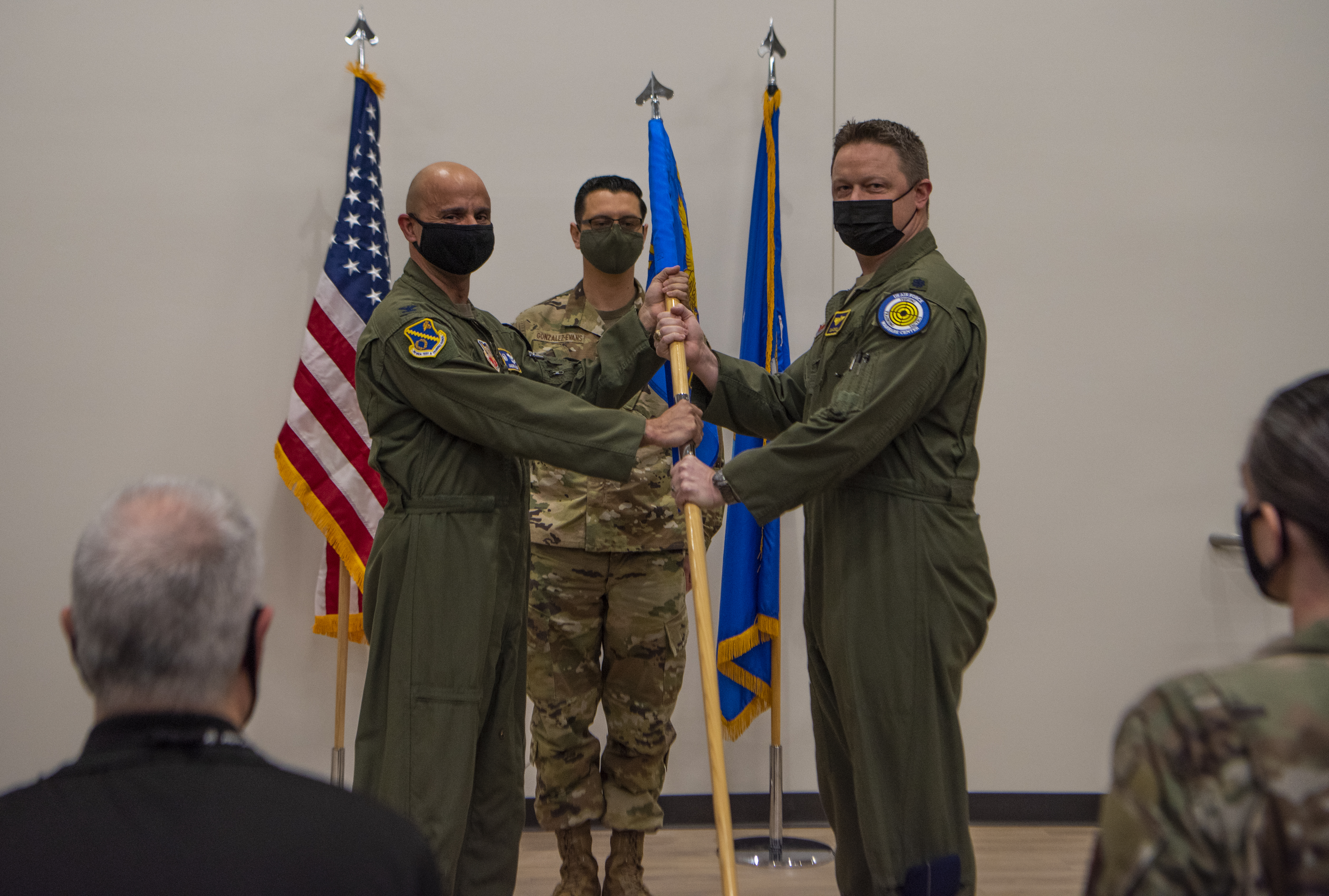
- Squadron activation ceremony in 2021
- Active: 1939–1944; 1944–1946; 1953–1955; 1956–1958; 1969–1971; 1982–1988; 2021–present
- Country: United States
- Branch: United States Air Force
- Role: Training
- Part of: Air Combat Command: United States Air Force Warfare Center; Nevada Test and Training Range
- Garrison/HQ: Nellis Air Force Base, Nevada

Insignia
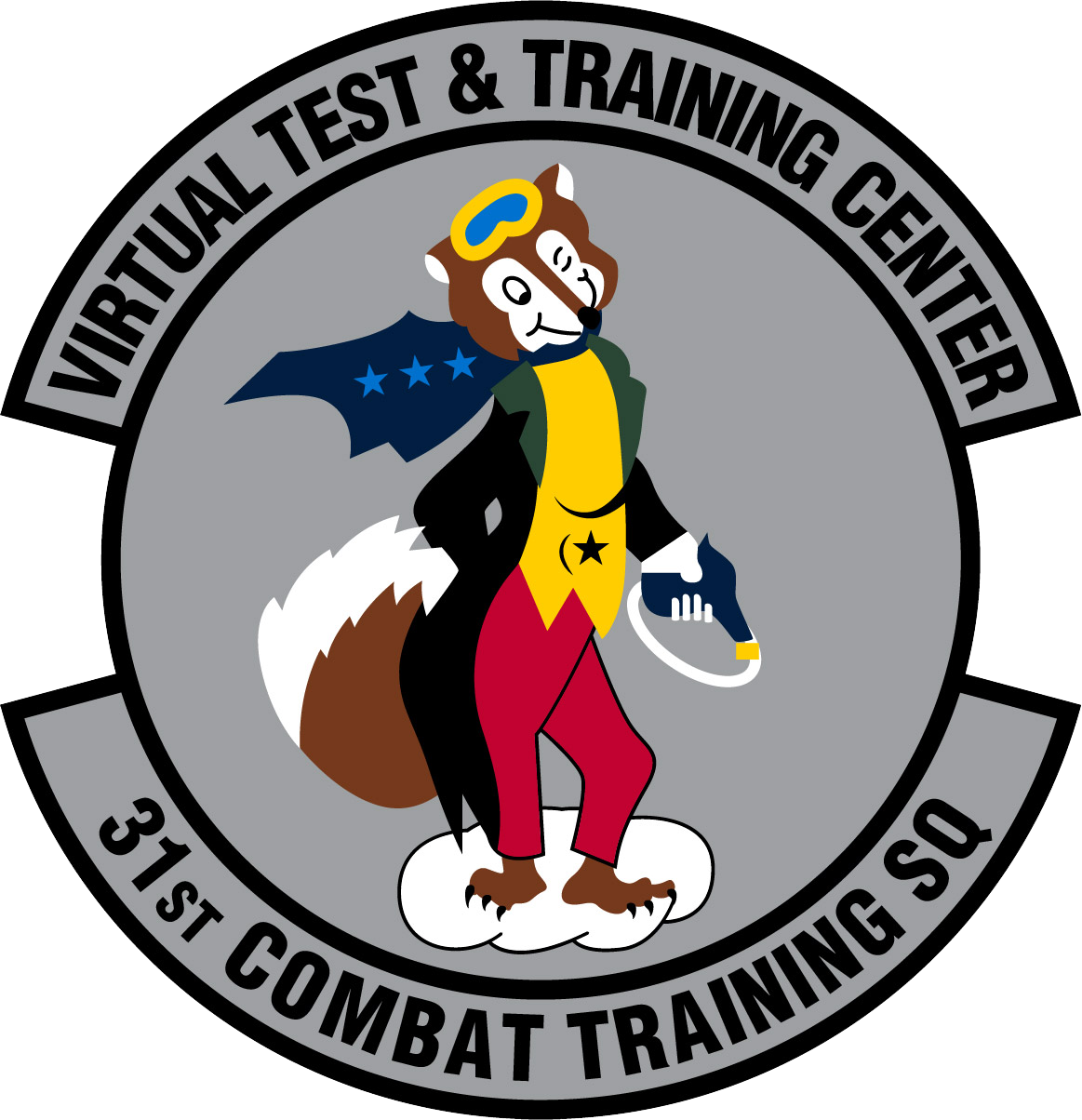
- 31st Combat Training Squadron emblem

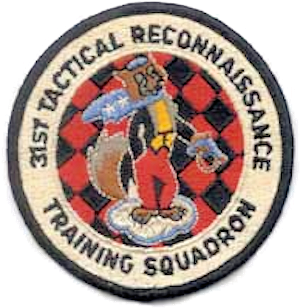
- 31st Tactical Reconnaissance Training Squadron patch

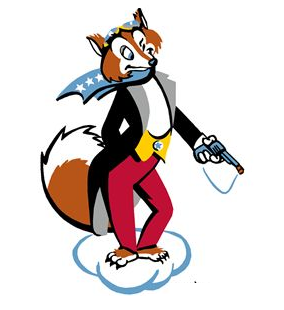
- 31st Fighter Squadron emblem (Note: Approved 24 August 1943.)

The 31st Combat Training Squadron is an active United States Air Force unit. It is currently assigned to the Nevada Test and Training Range at Nellis Air Force Base, Nevada.

The squadron was first activated as the 31st Pursuit Squadron for the air defense of the Panama Canal shortly before the United States entered World War II. It served in this role until 1944 when the reduced threat to the canal and the Caribbean permitted its transfer to the United States, where it was inactivated. The squadron was reactivated a few months later as an element of the 412th Fighter Group, the first Army Air Forces unit equipped with jet fighters. It was inactivated in 1946 when the 412th group and its squadrons were replaced by elements of the 1st Fighter Group.

In 1953, the squadron was activated as the 31st Fighter-Interceptor Squadron, an air defense unit in the Pacific northwest. It was inactivated two years later in a major realignment of Air Defense Command fighter unit designations. It was again active in the air defense role from 1956 to 1958 in Michigan and Alaska.

It became a training unit in 1969, first training tactical reconnaissance aircrews on the McDonnell RF-4C Phantom II from 1969 to 1971 as the '31st Tactical Reconnaissance Training Squadron, then acting as the "schoolhouse" for F-4 aircrews from 1982 to 1988.

A ceremony activating the 31st Combat Training Squadron (Virtual Test and Training Center) was held on 9 April 2021, at Nellis Air Force Base.

== Mission ==
The squadron operates the Virtual Test and Training Center, a multi-domain, advanced training, tactics, and testing campus, supporting the USAF Weapons School. It supports operational test, combatant command exercises, and colored flag exercises. The mission of the 31st is to enhance, sustain, and operate a synthetic environment to optimize warfighting capabilities and ready aircrew.

== History ==
=== World War II ===
==== Defense of the Panama Canal ====
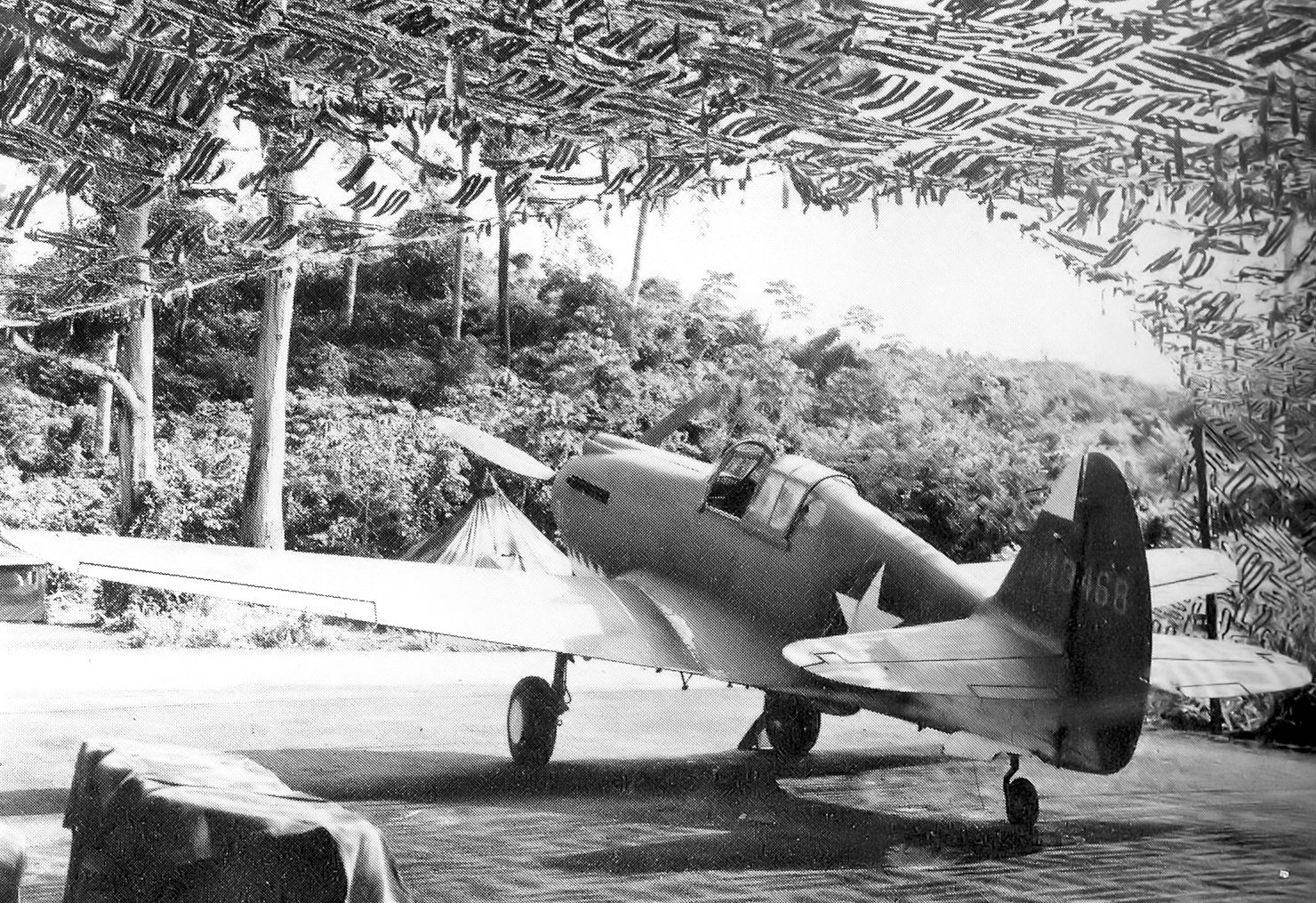
31st Pursuit Squadron P-40 at La Joya Field (Note: Aircraft is Curtiss P-40C serial 41-13468. Taken at La Joya Field Number 1, Panama, December 1941.)

The squadron was constituted in 1939 as the 31st Pursuit Squadron and activated on 1 February 1940 at Albrook Field, Panama Canal Zone as one of the original squadrons of the 37th Pursuit Group. The unit was part of the build-up of the Canal Zone's defenses as war approached. It was initially equipped with a mixture of second-line pursuit aircraft, including Boeing P-26A Peashooters, Northrup A-17 Nomads, and some North American BC-1s. The mission of the squadron was air defense of the Panama Canal. In July 1941, the Squadron started re-equipping with new Curtiss P-40 Warhawks. The Squadron was briefly moved to Rio Hato Field on 5 October 1940 and, following a month there, returned to Albrook on 13 November, where it remained until 24 November 1941.

After the Japanese Attack on Pearl Harbor, the Squadron was moved to La Chorrera Army Airfield where it shared the field with the 30th Pursuit Squadron. The unit operated as an element of the Panama Interceptor Command. On 15 May 1942, the squadron's designation was changed to 31st Fighter Squadron. In September 1942, the unit moved from Albrook to Howard Field and started to convert to Bell P-39 Airacobras. In December, "E" Flight was moved to San Jose Airport, Costa Rica where it was almost immediately reassigned to the 53d Fighter Squadron.

The unit served out the remainder of its Panama tour at several airfields until April 1944, and was moved to the United States as Sixth Air Force eliminated or transferred combat units in view of the reduced threat to the Panama Canal and Caribbean. The squadron was to become a single-engine fighter Replacement Training Unit for Second Air Force at Lincoln Army Air Field, Nebraska, but it was inactivated seven weeks after it arrived at Lincoln.

==== First Jet Fighters ====
The squadron was activated once again as part of the 412th Fighter Group, which was located at Muroc Army Air Field, California in August 1944. It became a testing unit for the Bell P-59 Airacomet and Lockheed P-80 Shooting Star jet aircraft under Fourth Air Force. The squadron served in a training role for transitioning pilots from piston-engine to jet engine fighters. The squadron provided Army Air Forces pilots and ground crews with valuable data about the difficulties and pitfalls involved in converting to jet aircraft. This information proved quite useful when more advanced jet fighters finally became available in quantity. The squadron was inactivated in July 1946 and its mission, personnel, and equipment were transferred to the 71st Fighter Squadron as the AAF replaced the 412th with the 1st Fighter Group.

=== Air Defense ===
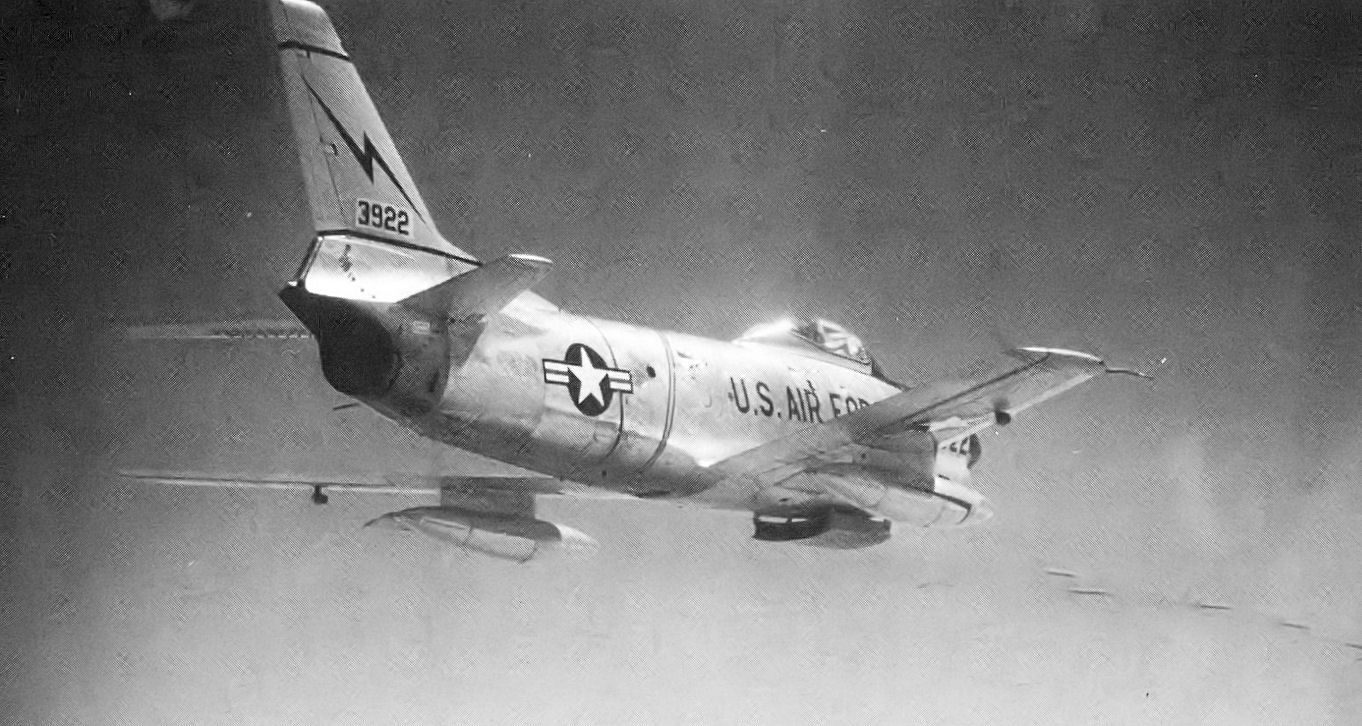
F-86D near Larson AFB in 1955 (Note: Aircraft is North American F-86D Sabre serial 52-3922, taken in 1955.)

The squadron was reactivated as the 31st Fighter-Interceptor Squadron, an element Air Defense Command at Larson Air Force Base, Washington in early 1953 and assigned to the 4702d Defense Wing. At Larson the squadron was equipped with Mighty Mouse rocket armed and airborne intercept radar equipped North American F-86D Sabre interceptors. The squadron was engaged in the air defense of the Pacific Northwest. In the summer of 1955 ADC implemented Project Arrow, which was designed to bring back on the active list the fighter units which had compiled memorable records in the two world wars and associate them with their traditional headquarters. As a result, the mission, personnel and equipment of the 31st were transferred to the 322d Fighter-Interceptor Squadron IAW ADC "Project Arrow".

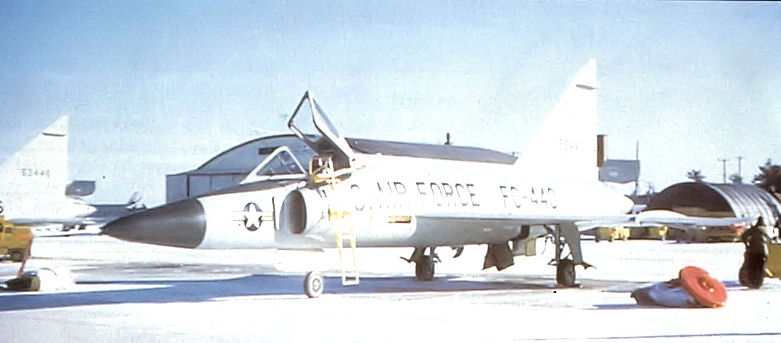
31st FIS F-102A (Note: Aircraft is Convair F-102A-80-CO Delta Dagger serial 56-1440. Taken at Wurtsmuth AFB, Michigan.)

The squadron was again reactivated in 1956 at Wurtsmith Air Force Base, Michigan and equipped with supersonic Convair F-102 Delta Daggers armed with the AIM-4 Falcon missile. The following year it moved to Elmendorf Air Force Base, Alaska Territory where it performed intercepts of intruding aircraft as part of Alaskan Air Command, arriving in Alaska. The squadron was inactivated in October 1958 and its aircraft were reassigned to the 317th Fighter Interceptor Squadron.

=== Training ===
The 31st was redesignated as the 31st Tactical Reconnaissance Training Squadron and reactivated under Tactical Air Command (TAC) at Shaw Air Force Base, South Carolina in 1969, where it assumed the mission, personnel and equipment of 4414th Combat Crew Training Squadron, which was discontinued. This was part of TAC's program to replace its Major Command controlled (MAJCON)units with USAF controlled (AFCON) units that were able to carry a permanent lineage and history. (Note: MAJCON units could not carry a permanent history or lineage. Ravenstein, p. 12.) The squadron conducted RF-4C Phantom II training for tactical reconnaissance aircrews. The squadron was inactivated in 1971 due to reduced training requirements, and its aircraft assigned to the 33d Tactical Reconnaissance Training Squadron.

In 1982, the squadron became the 31st Tactical Training Squadron and was activated at Homestead Air Force Base, Florida. In 1988, the 31st Tactical Fighter Wing's mission switched from training to readiness as a fighter unit and the squadron was inactivated.

In April 2021, the squadron became the 31st Combat Training Squadron and was activated at Nellis Air Force Base, Nevada.

== Lineage ==
- Constituted as the 31st Pursuit Squadron (Interceptor) on 22 December 1939

Activated on 1 February 1940
Redesignated 31st Fighter Squadron (Single Engine) on 15 May 1942
Inactivated on 25 May 1944

- Activated on 19 August 1944

Inactivated on 3 July 1946

- Redesignated 31st Fighter-Interceptor Squadron on 11 February 1953

Activated on 20 April 1953
Inactivated on 18 August 1955

- Activated on 8 June 1956

Inactivated on 8 October 1958

- Redesignated 31st Tactical Reconnaissance Training Squadron on 18 August 1969

Organized on 15 October 1969
Inactivated on 18 February 1971

- Redesignated 31st Tactical Training Squadron on 20 April 1982

Activated on 1 May 1982
Inactivated on 9 May 1988

- Redesignated 31st Combat Training Squadron

Activated on 9 April 2021

=== Assignments ===
- 37th Pursuit Group, 1 February 1940 (later 37th Fighter Group)
- XXVI Fighter Command, 1 November 1943
- Second Air Force, 8 April – 25 May 1944
- 412th Fighter Group, 19 August 1944 – 3 July 1946
- 4702d Defense Wing, 20 April 1953
- 9th Air Division, 8 October 1954 – 18 August 1955
- 412th Fighter Group, 8 June 1956
- 10th Air Division, 20 August 1957 – 8 October 1958
- 363d Tactical Reconnaissance Wing, 16 October 1969 – 18 February 1971
- 31st Tactical Training Wing (later 31st Tactical Fighter Wing), 1 May 1982 – 9 May 1988
- Nevada Test and Training Range, 9 April 2021 – present

=== Stations ===
- Albrook Field, Panama Canal Zone, 1 February 1940
- Rio Hato Field, Panama, 5 October 1940
- Albrook Field, Panama Canal Zone, 13 November 1940
- La Chorrera Army Airfield, Panama, 9 December 1941
- Albrook Field, Panama Canal Zone, 23 December 1941
- La Chorrera Army Airfield, Panama, 3 February 1942
- Albrook Field, Panama Canal Zone, 19 May 1942
- Howard Field, Panama Canal Zone, 30 September 1942 – 25 March 1944
- Lincoln Army Air Field, Nebraska, 8 April – 25 May 1944
- Palmdale Army Air Field, California, 19 August 1944
- Santa Maria Army Air Field, California, 10 July 1945
- March Field, California, 6 December 1945 – 3 July 1946
- Larson Air Force Base, Washington, 20 April 1953 – 18 August 1955
- Wurtsmith Air Force Base, Michigan, 8 June 1956
- Elmendorf Air Force Base, Alaska, 20 August 1957 – 8 October 1958
- Shaw Air Force Base, South Carolina, 16 October 1969 – 18 February 1971
- Homestead Air Force Base, Florida, 1 May 1982 – 9 May 1988
- Nellis Air Force Base, Nevada, c. 9 April 2021 – present

=== Aircraft ===
- Boeing P-26 Peashooter, 1940–1942
- Curtiss P-40 Warhawk, 1941–1944
- Bell P-39 Airacobra, 1942–1944
- Curtiss A-25 Helldiver, 1944
- Lockheed P-38 Lightning, 1944
- Douglas A-24 Banshee, 1944–1945
- Bell P-63 Kingcobra, 1944–1945
- YP/P-59A Airacomet, 1944–1945
- XP-80 Shooting Star, 1944–1945
- North American P-51 Mustang, 1945–1946
- Lockheed P-80 Shooting Star, 1945–1946
- North American F-86D Sabre, 1953–1955
- Convair F-102 Delta Dagger, 1956–1958
- McDonnell RF-4C Phantom II, 1969-1971
