= 74th Reconnaissance Squadron =

74th Reconnaissance Squadron

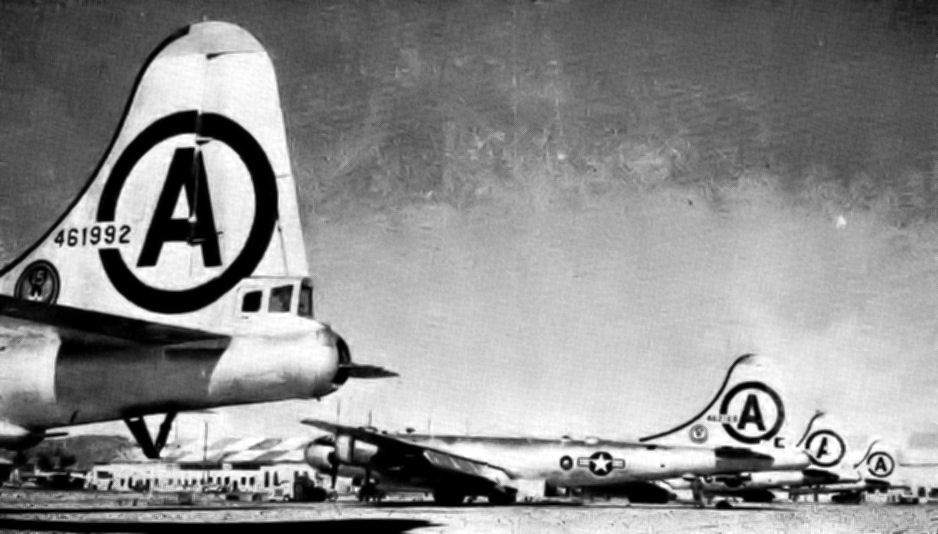
- 106th Bombardment Wing B-29 Superfortresses 1951
- Active: 1919–1919; 1933–1946; 1951–1952; 2019–present
- Country: United States
- Branch: United States Air Force
- Role: Reconnaissance
- Part of: Air Combat Command
- Motto: Conceditur Accessum Latin Access is Granted
- Engagements: Antisubmarine Campaign, American Theater of World War II

Insignia
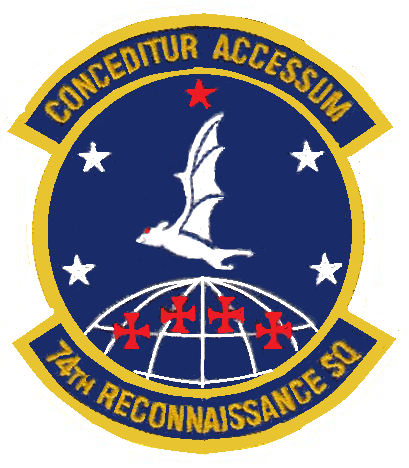
- 74th Reconnaissance Squadron emblem

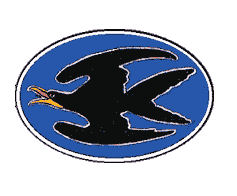
- 74th Bombardment Squadron emblem (Note: Approved 23 August 1934.)

The 74th Reconnaissance Squadron is an active United States Air Force unit, part of the 9th Reconnaissance Wing at Beale Air Force Base, California. The squadron was first active during World War II as the 74th Aero Squadron. In 1933 it was consolidated with the 74th Pursuit Squadron, which had been organized as a reserve training organization in 1927, activating in the Panama Canal Zone, where it served during World War II as the 74th Bombardment Squadron.

During the Korean War, the squadron was redesignated the 135th Bombardment Squadron and assigned to the 106th Bombardment Wing, a federalized Air National Guard unit, at March Air Force Base, California. It was inactivated on 1 December 1952 when the 106th Wing was returned to the National Guard and replaced by the regular 320th Bombardment Wing. The squadron was reactivated as a reconnaissance unit in December 2019.

== History ==
=== Aero Squadron ===
The first predecessor of the squadron was established at Waco, Texas in February 1918 as the 74th Aero Squadron, (Note: This was the second Air Service unit designated as the 74th Aero Squadron. The first had been redesignated as the 486th Aero Squadron) In July 1918, the 74th moved to the New York City area, where it served, probably with Airco DH.4 aircraft as a tactical defense unit until it was demobilized in January 1919. It was again organized at Langley Field, Virginia in June, but was again demobilized on 25 September 1919

=== Interwar years ===
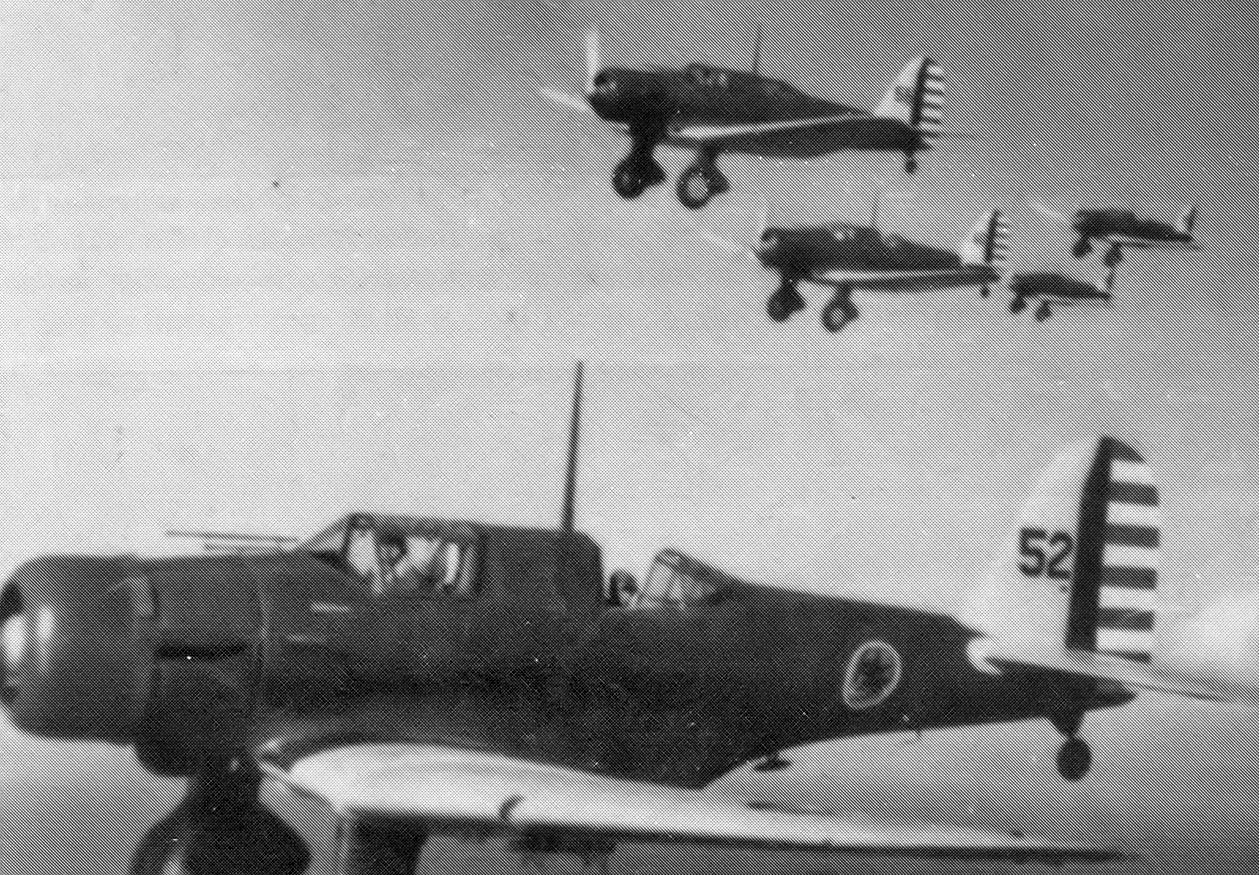
Flight of 74th Attack Squadron A-17s over Panama

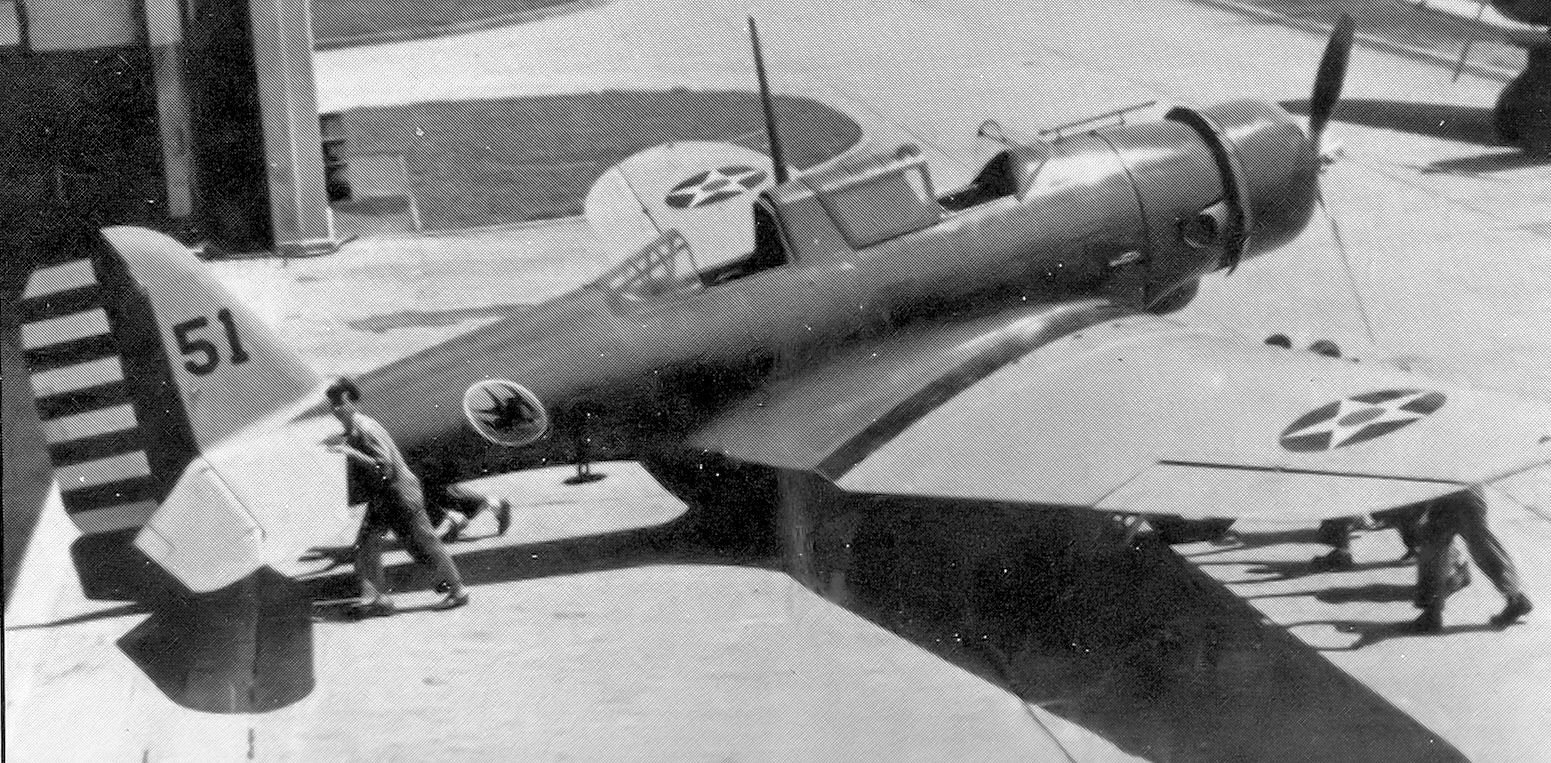
74th AS Northrup A-17 closeup with ground crew, 1939

The second predecessor of the unit was constituted as the 74th Attack Squadron in October 1927 as a Regular Army Inactive unit and allotted to the Eighth Corps Area. Although inactive as a regular unit, it was partially organized with reserve personnel at Fort Crockett, Texas. Organized Reserve officers assigned to the unit participated in summer training at Fort Crockett with elements of the 3d Attack Group. In May 1929, it was redesignated the 74th Pursuit Squadron and assigned to the 18th, then to the 20th Pursuit Group for administration.

The squadron was activated as a regular unit in October 1933 at Albrook Field, Panama Canal Zone and equipped with Boeing P-12s, while its reservists remained at Fort Crockett. It was assigned to the 16th Pursuit Group at Albrook. Three years later the two squadrons were consolidated into a single unit. The squadron was redesignated the 74th Attack Squadron on 1 September 1937 and equipped with Northrop A-17s.

Reorganized and redesignated 74th Bombardment Squadron on 1 November 1939. Redesignated as the 74th Bombardment Squadron (Medium) on 6 December 1939. Relieved from assignment to the 16th Pursuit Group. Designated as the 74th Bombardment Squadron (Medium) at Albrook Field circa 5 March 1940, converting to Douglas B-18 Bolo. On 20 November 1940, the squadron was again re-designated as the 74th Bombardment Squadron (Heavy). On 14 July, the squadron moved from Albrook to Howard Field, in anticipation of receipt of its first Boeing B-17B Flying Fortress the following month.

=== World War II ===
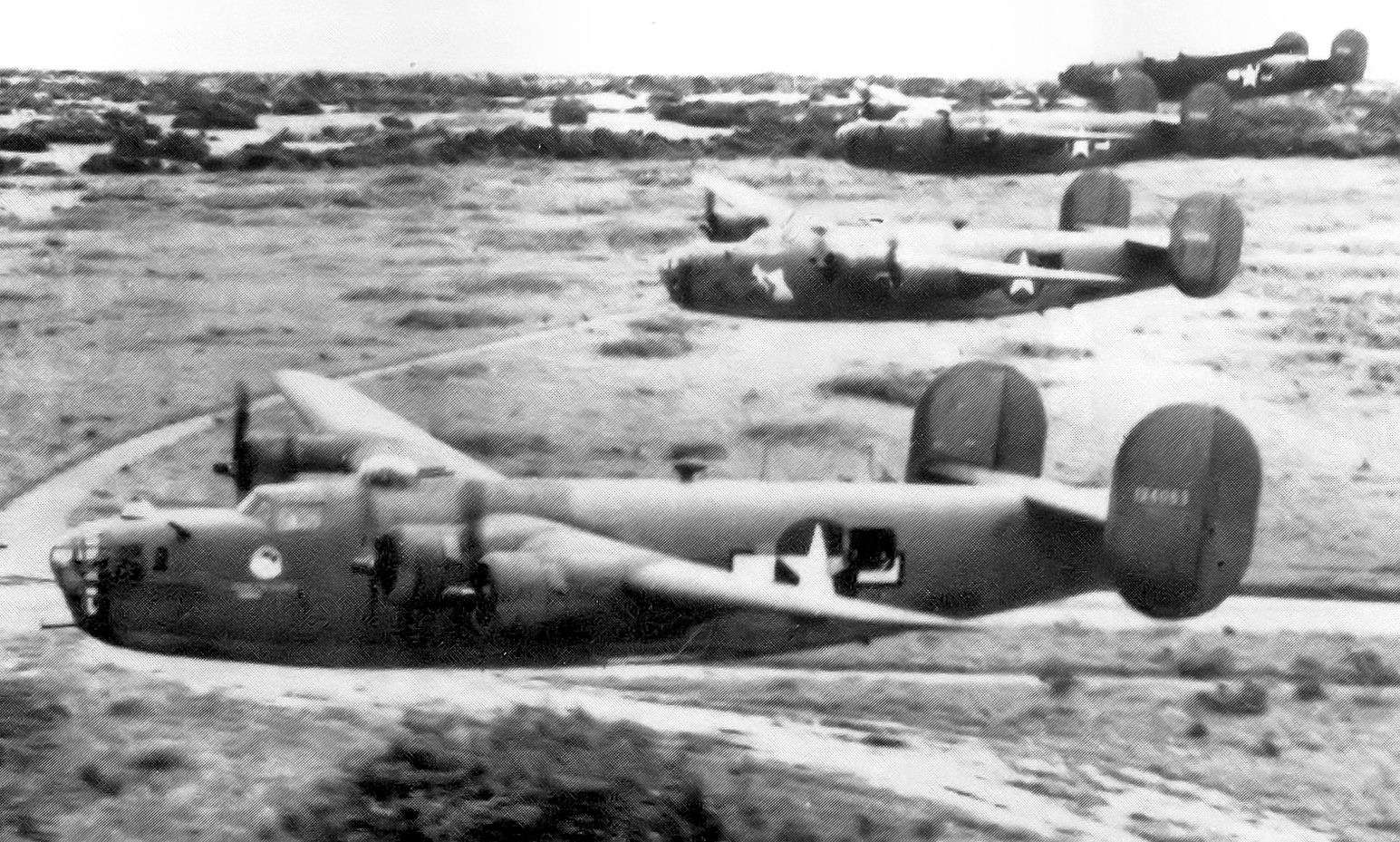
B-24D Liberators flying from Rio Hato Panama, 1944

The Squadron moved from Howard Field to Aguadulce Field, Panama, on 8 November 1941 and, following the Pearl Harbor Attack, moved to Rio Hato Army Airfield on 11 December. By 16 January 1942, the unit had been transformed, and found itself at Guatemala City Airport, Guatemala, equipped with six Boeing B-17B's and four B-17E's taken over and consolidated from other units. In August 1942, the Squadron was assigned to the 40th Bombardment Group and this assignment lasted until 12 May 1943. Began conversion to Consolidated B-24D Liberators in mid-1943. By October 1943, the 74th was the only Sixth Air Force tactical unit still operating from Guatemala City Airport and, the following month, ended its association with the 6th Bombardment Group, when that organization was disbanded. It subsequently fell directly under VI Bomber Command.

The period between April and August, the unit moved again to the remote Seymour Island AAF on the Galapagos Islands. The move accomplished, the unit engaged in patrols over the eastern Pacific. The unit returned to Aguadulce Field, Panama, on 13 February 1945 after only some seven months. In May. the Squadron moved to Rio Hato Field, remaining until the end of the war, being inactivated on 1 November 1946.

=== Korean War ===
The squadron was reactivated as the 135th Bombardment Squadron on 27 March 1951. It operated B-29 Superfortresses as part of the Federalized 106th Bombardment Group, New York Air National Guard that was elevated to active duty at March Air Force Base, California during the Korean War. The 135th Bomb Squadron continued operations under SAC's Fifteenth Air Force until it was inactivated, with personnel and equipment being assigned to the 320th Bombardment Wing when the guardsmen were relieved from active duty on 1 December 1952.

=== Reconnaissance operations ===
The squadron was redesignated the 74th Reconnaissance Squadron and activated at Beale Air Force Base, California in December 2019. At Beale, it was assigned to the 9th Operations Group. Its organization is believed to have originated from the 9th Operations Group Detachment 5, which was activated in 2018 and whose logo contained elements similar to the 74th's current patch.

== Lineage ==
74th Aero Squadron

- Organized as the 74th Aero Squadron (Service) on 22 February 1918

Demobilized on 28 January 1919

- Organized on 17 June 1919

Demobilized on 25 September 1919

- Reconstituted and consolidated with the 74th Attack Squadron as the 74th Attack Squadron c. 16 October 1936

74th Reconnaissance Squadron

- Constituted as the 74th Attack Squadron on 18 October 1927 and organized as a Regular Army Inactive unit

Redesignated 74th Pursuit Squadron on 8 May 1929
Activated on 1 October 1933

- Consolidated with the 74th Aero Squadron c. 5 December 1936

Redesignated 74th Attack Squadron on 1 September 1937
Redesignated 74th Bombardment Squadron on 1 November 1939
Redesignated 74th Bombardment Squadron (Medium) on 6 December 1939
Redesignated 74th Bombardment Squadron (Heavy) on 20 November 1940
Redesignated 74th Bombardment Squadron, Heavy c. August 1943
Inactivated on 1 November 1946

- Redesignated: 135th Bombardment Squadron, Medium on 27 March 1951

Activated on 1 May 1951
Inactivated on 1 December 1952

- Redesignated 74th Reconnaissance Squadron on 4 December 2019

Activated on 19 December 2019

=== Assignments ===
- Unknown, 1918–1919
- Allotted to Eighth Corps Area on 18 October 1927
- 18th Pursuit Group, 8 May 1929
- 20th Pursuit Group, 15 June 1932
- 16th Pursuit Group, 1 October 1933
- 6th Bombardment Group, 1 February 1940
- 40th Bombardment Group, 9 August 1942
- 6th Bombardment Group, 12 May 1943
- VI Bomber Command, 1 November 1943 – 1 November 1946
- 106th Bombardment Group, 1 May 1951
- 106th Bombardment Wing, 16 June – 1 December 1952
- 9th Operations Group, 19 December 2019 – present

=== Stations ===
- Waco, Texas, 22 February 1918
- Call Field, Texas, 1 March 1918
- Hazelhurst Field, New York, 29 July 1918
- Roosevelt Field, New York, September 1918
- Garden City, New York, Unknown-28 January 1919
- Langley Field, Virginia, 17 June – 25 September 1919
- Fort Crockett, Texas, 18 October 1927
- Albrook Field, Panama Canal Zone, 1 October 1933
- Howard Field, Panama Canal Zone, 14 July 1941
- Aguadulce Airfield, Panama, 8 November 1941
- Rio Hato Airfield, Panama, c. 11 December 1941
- Guatemala City, Guatemala, 9 January 1942
- Rio Hato Airfield, Panama, c. 7 April 1944
- Seymour Island Airfield, Galápagos Islands, Ecuador, c. 21 August 1944
- Aguadulce Airfield, Panama, 13 February 1945
- Rio Hato Airfield, Panama, 3. May 1945-1 November 1946
- March Air Force Base, California, 1 May 1951 – 1 December 1952
- Beale Air Force Base, California, 19 December 2019 – present

=== Aircraft ===
- DH-4 Liberty Plane, 1918–1919
- Boeing P-12, 1933–1937
- OA-3, 1933–1937
- B-6, 1933–1937
- Northrop A-17 Nomad, 1937–1940
- A-8, 1937–1940
- 0A-9, 1937–1940
- Douglas B-18 Bolo, 1939–1942
- Boeing B-17 Flying Fortress, 1942–1943
- Consolidated B-24 Liberator, 1942–1946
- Boeing B-29 Superfortress, 1951–1952

== See also ==
- List of American Aero Squadrons
