= Aguadulce Army Air Field =

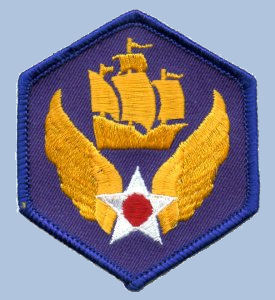
Aguadulce Army Airfield
- Part of Sixth Air Force
- Located in Panama

Site information
- Type: Military Airfield
- Controlled by: United States Army Air Forces

Location
- Coordinates: 08°15′03.42″N 080°33′55.34″W

Site history
- In use: 1941-1945

Aguadulce Army Airfield (also known as Airdrome Aguadulce ) is a former United States Army Air Forces World War II airfield in Panama used as part of the defense of the Panama Canal. It was closed on 1 March 1948.

Established on 1 April 1941, Aguadulce Airfield's mission was to defend the Panama Canal. Most of its operational history was that of an auxiliary airfield, hosting fighter squadrons. Training of South American air force personnel was also conducted at the field.

Wartime units assigned were:

- 74th Bombardment Squadron(6th Bombardment Group)

8 November-11 December 1941 (B-18 Bolo)
13 February-1 May 1945 (B-24 Liberator)

- 59th Bombardment Squadron (9th Bombardment Group), 11 December 1941 – 19 February 1942

Detachment operated from: Hato Field, Curaçao, 13 January-24 September 1942
Detachment operated from: Dakota Field, Aruba, 14 January-24 September 1942

- 29th Bombardment Squadron (40th Bombardment Group), 16 June 1942 – 29 March 1943 (B-18 Bolo, Northrop A-17 Nomad)
- 30th Fighter Squadron (XXVI Fighter Command), 10 February 1943 – 25 January 1945 (P-40 Warhawk)

With the end of World War II Aguadulce was reduced in scope, with only a skeleton staff. It was closed on 1 March 1948 due to budget reductions. For several years, it was used as a civil airport, but was later closed; today the airfield is abandoned, with the runway still visible but in poor condition.
