= 6th Air Division =

6th Air Division may refer to:

- 6th Air Division (Japan)
- 6th Air Division (United States)
- 6th Fighter Division, People's Republic of China
- 6th Guards Fighter Aviation Division, Soviet Union

== See also ==
- 6th Division (disambiguation)
