= XXVI Fighter Command =

Former formation of the United States Army Air Forces

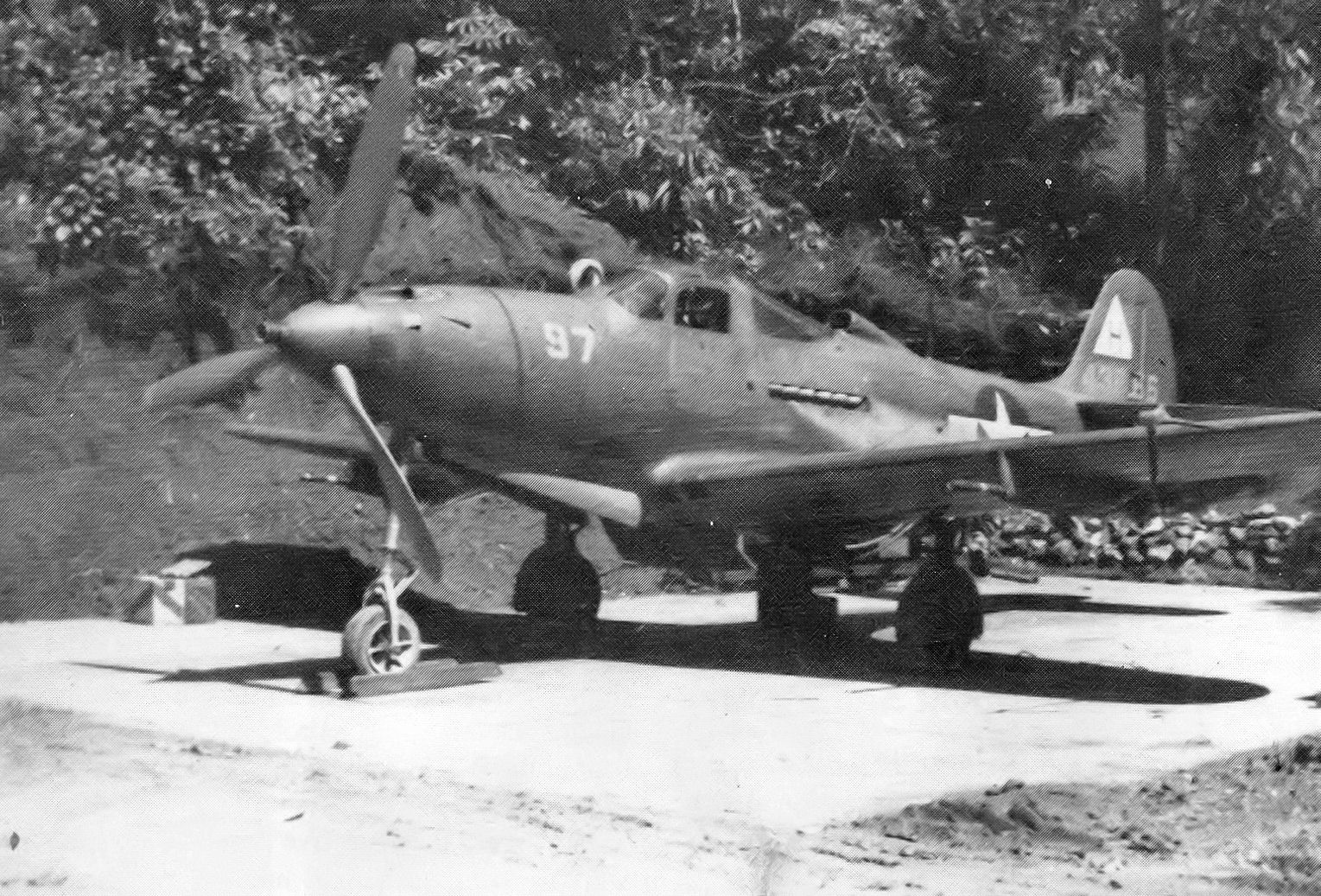
- P-39Q Airacobra of the 28th Fighter Squadron (Note: Airplane is Bell P-39Q-20-BE Airacobra, serial 44-3866)
- Active: 1942–1946
- Country: United States
- Branch: United States Air Force
- Role: Command of fighter units
- Part of: Sixth Air Force
- Engagements: American Theater of World War II

The XXVI Fighter Command was a formation of the United States Army Air Forces. It was assigned to Sixth Air Force throughout its existence. It was based at Albrook Field, Panama Canal Zone, where it was inactivated on 25 August 1946. It engaged in antisubmarine operations from the Canal Zone.

== History ==
=== Background ===
In November 1940, fighter units in the Panama Canal Zone were organized into the 12th Pursuit Wing. In May 1941, the 12th Wing's units began operating under the Panama Region, Caribbean Interceptor Command, which became the Panama Region, 6th Interceptor Command, when that command was activated in Puerto Rico on 25 October 1941, and Panama Interceptor Command on 12 December 1941, shortly after the attack on Pearl Harbor. In March 1942, the 12th Wing was inactivated and transferred its mission, personnel and equipment to the newly-formed 26th Interceptor Command.

=== Defense of the Panama Canal ===
The air defense of the Panama Canal proceeded on the assumption that the greatest threat to the canal was from carrier launched low level and dive bombers attacking from the Gatun Lake or Pacific Ocean side of the canal. Its initial equipment was Bell P-39 Airacobras and Curtiss P-40 Warhawks. A decision was made locally to employ American women residing in the Canal Zone as plotters and tellers in the command's fighter information center at Albrook Field. By late 1943, the chance of an attack on the Panama Canal was seen as remote, and operations began to wind down. Most of the command's fighter groups inactivated or transferred and the remaining component squadrons were assigned directly to the command.

The command participated in joint exercises with United States Navy surface and air forces, some of which exposed serious defects in canal defenses.

In early 1943, the command assumed an additional role of providing advanced training for fighter pilots destined for overseas assignment. The 30th Fighter Squadron assumed the role of an operational training unit and took over the older P-40B and P-40C Warhawks. Between a quarter and a third of the pilots trained by the 30th moved on to combat assignments with other commands. In 1944, the squadron trained the 1st Brazilian Fighter Squadron, which would deploy to Italy.

The command was inactivated on 25 August 1946 and disbanded two years later. (Note: In 1947 the United States Air Force became independent. The Army transferred all Air Corps units, including the command to the USAF.)

== Lineage ==
- Constituted as 26th Interceptor Command on 28 February 1942 (Note: Maurer indicates that the unit was constituted as the "XXVI" Interceptor Command. However, the unit was constituted and activated with an arabic number in its name. The use of roman numerals to designate Army Air Forces combat commands did not begin until September 1942. "Air Force Historical Research Agency Organizational Reconds: Types of USAF Organizations". Air Force History Index. 9 January 2008.): Activated on 6 March 1942

Redesignated: 26th Fighter Command on 15 May 1942
Redesignated: XXVI Fighter Command c. 18 September 1942
Inactivated on 25 August 1946
Disbanded on 8 October 1948

=== Components ===
Groups

- 16th Pursuit Group (later 16th Fighter Group), 6 March 1942 – 1 November 1943
- 32d Fighter Group, 6 March 1942 – 1 November 1943
- 37th Fighter Group, 18 September 1942 – 1 November 1943
- 53d Pursuit Group (later 53d Fighter Group), 6 March – 26 November 1942

Squadrons

- 16th Fighter Control Squadron, June 1943
- 24th Fighter Squadron, 1 November 1943 – 25 August 1946
- 28th Fighter Squadron, 1 November 1943 – 25 August 1946
- 29th Fighter Squadron, 1 November 1943 – 8 April 1944
- 30th Fighter Squadron, 1 November 1943 – 25 August 1946
- 31st Fighter Squadron, 1 November 1943 – 8 April 1944
- 32d Fighter Squadron, 13 March 1944 - 25 Aug 1946
- 32nd Fighter Control Squadron, June 1943
- 43d Fighter Squadron, 1 November 1943 – 25 August 1946
- 51st Fighter Squadron, 1 November 1943 – 25 August 1946
- 52d Fighter Squadron, 1 November 1943 – 8 April 1944 (Note: Maurer indicates the 52d Squadron was assigned to the 32d Fighter Group during this period. However, the group was disbanded on 1 November 1943. Maurer, Combat Squadrons, p. 219. Compare Maurer, Combat Units, p. (assignment to 32d Group terminated in 1943).)

Other

- 516th Signal Aircraft Warning Regiment, June 1943
- 7th Radar Calibration Detachment, 1 August 1944 – March 1945

=== Stations ===
- Albrook Field, Panama Canal Zone, 6 March 1942 – 25 August 1946

=== Aircraft ===
- Bell P-39 Airacobra, 1942 – 1944
- Curtiss P-40 Warhawk, 1942 – 1944
- Lockheed P-38 Lightning, 1944 – 1946

=== Campaign ===
Campaign Streamer	Campaign	Dates	Notes
	Antisubmarine	21 August 1942 – 2 September 1945	
