= Albrook Air Force Station =

US Air Force facility in Panama

Albrook Air Force Station
- Part of Air Combat Command
- Located near Balboa, Panama

Site information
- Type: Military Air Force Station
- Controlled by: United States Air Force

Location
- Coordinates: 08°58′33.24″N 079°33′19.91″W

Site history
- Built: 1928
- In use: 1932-1997

Albrook Air Force Station is a former United States Air Force facility in Panama. It was closed on 30 September 1997 as a result of the Torrijos-Carter Treaties which specified that United States military facilities in the former Panama Canal Zone be closed and the facilities be turned over to the Panamanian government. It was located on the east side of the Panama Canal just south of Fort Clayton and north of the township of Balboa, Panama. Beginning in January 1999, the air field initiated civilian air service as Albrook "Marcos A. Gelabert" International Airport.

== Major commands to which assigned ==
- Panama Canal Department, 1932- 19 October 1940
- Panama Canal Air Force, 19 October 1940 - 5 August 1941
- Caribbean Air Force, 5 August 1941 - 18 September 1942
- Sixth Air Force, 18 September 1942 - 31 July 1946
- Caribbean Air Command, 31 July 1946 - 8 July 1963
- United States Air Forces Southern Command, 8 July 1963 - 1 January 1976
- Tactical Air Command

USAF Southern Air Division, 1 January 1976 - 1 January 1989
830th Air Division, 1 January 1989 - 15 February 1991
Air Forces Panama, 15 February 1991 - 11 February 1992

- Tactical Air Command, 11 February - 31 May 1992
- Air Combat Command, 31 May 1992 - 30 September 1997

== Major units assigned ==
- 16th Pursuit (later Fighter) Group

24th Pursuit (later Fighter) Squadron, 26 October 1932-10 January 1943; 28 May-9 June 1943
28th Pursuit Squadron, 1 February-5 October 1940
29th Pursuit (later Fighter) Squadron, 1 October 1933-17 May 1942
43d Pursuit (later Fighter) Squadron, 1 February 1940-13 July 1942
73d Pursuit Squadron, 1 October 1933-14 July 1941
78th Pursuit Squadron, 15 October 1932-1 September 1937

- 19th Composite Wing, 25 January 1933

Redesignated 19th Wing, 1937
Redesignated 19th Bombardment Wing, 1940 - 25 October 1941

- 37th Pursuit (later Fighter) Group

30th Pursuit Squadron, 13 November 1940-24 November 1941
31st Pursuit (later Fighter) Squadron, 13 November 1940-9 November 1941; 31 December 1941-3 February 1942; 19 May-30 September 1942

- Headquarters, Panama Canal Air Force, 20 November 1940

Redesignated: Caribbean Air Force. August 5, 1941
Redesignated: 6th Air Force, September 18, 1942
Redesignated: Caribbean Air Command, July 31, 1946
Redesignated: United States Air Forces Southern Command July 8, 1963-1 January 1976

- 12 Pursuit Wing, 10 November 1940 – 6 March 1942
- 32d Pursuit (later Fighter) Group

51st Pursuit Squadron, 1 January-21 August 1941
52d Pursuit Squadron, 1 January-21 August 1941
53d Pursuit Squadron, 1 January-21 August 1941

- VI Bomber Command, 25 October 1941 – 1 November 1946
- XXVI Fighter Command, 6 March 1942 - 25 August 1946
- 1st Communications Squadron, Air Support, 23 April 1942-April 1943
- 40th Bombardment Group, 16 September 1942 - 3 June 1943
- 6th Bombardment Group, 14 January - 1 November 1943

3rd Bombardment Squadron
74th Bombardment Squadron

- Sixth Air Force Base Command

20th Troop Carrier Squadron, 9 June 1943-September 1948

- 1st Depot Repair Squadron, 6 May 1943 – 7 December 1944
- 314th Troop Carrier Group, 1 October 1946 - 10 March 1948
- 5700th Composite Wing

18th Troop Carrier Squadron, 1 August 1948-1 March 1949

- 24th Composite Wing, 8 November 1967 - 3 January 1968
- 830th Air Division, 1 January 1976 – 15 August 1977; 1 March 1989 – 15 February 1991

== Post USAF use ==
In September 1997, the base was turned over to Panama. It was then refurbished with an operations / control tower constructed; also a passenger terminal (near Building 446, the hangar that previously housed the former Air Force Post Office). In January 1999, the domestic/commercial Albrook "Marcos A. Gelabert" International Airport was relocated to Albrook from Punta Paitilla (across Panama City). The airport is under Panama's Civil Aeronautics Authority (Autoridad de Aeronáutica Civil —previously named Civil Aviation Directorate).

A number of shops, markets, mall and government agencies (Panamanian Red Cross, International Maritime University of Panama) operate out of some of the old buildings and hangars, and most of the officers quarters are now private homes.

The Civil Aviation Authority has its headquarters in Building 805.
