= 3rd Bombardment Squadron =

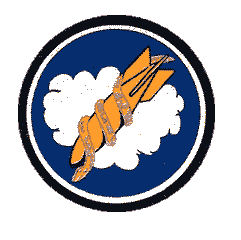
- Emblem of the 3rd Bombardment Squadron
- Active: 1940-1953
- Country: United States
- Branch: United States Air Force
- Role: Bombardment

The 3rd Bombardment Squadron is an inactive United States Air Force unit. Its last assignment was with the 111th Strategic Reconnaissance Wing, based at Travis Air Force Base, California. It was inactivated on 1 January 1953.

== History ==
=== World War II ===
Activated on 1 February 1940 at France Field, Panama Canal Zone; moved to Rio Hato Airfield just after the Attack on Pearl Harbor in December 1941. The unit was initially equipped with four Douglas B-18 Bolos and one B-17B. On 20 November 1940 it was formally redesignated as the 3rd Bombardment Squadron (Heavy) in keeping with the Air Corps-wide policy of configuring for future re-equipment and role definition.

It is known that the squadron received at least three Boeing B-17B Flying Fortresses (including 38-222, which was lost on 2 August 1941), one of the first Canal Zone-based units to operate the four-engined bomber. It is also known that the squadron utilized a number of the enlisted graduates of the Bombardiers School conducted at France Field to alleviate the critical shortage of these specialists in Canal Zone based units.

By 31 December 1941, the unit was operating essentially as an integrated unit with the 25th Bombardment Squadron at Rio Hato, the two squadrons were jointly operating nine new Boeing B-17Es, of which four were unserviceable due to parts shortages and the lack of maintenance experience of the ground crews on the type. By the end of January 1942, the squadron had surrendered its interest in the B-17Es, although a single Northrop A-17 was also on strength by this time, another being added by mid-February 1942. By mid-February, unit strength was further augmented by assignment of three more B-18s (for a total of seven B-18s and two B-18As, plus the A-17) but only eight combat crews were assigned to actually operate the aircraft; all of whom had less than 12-month experience on the aircraft on hand.

In May 1942 the squadron moved to Seymour Island Airfield in the Galapagos Islands, where its mission became to perform very long over-water patrols guarding the Pacific areas of the Panama Canal. It is not clear if the squadron re-equipped with Consolidated LB-30 Liberators prior to deploying to the Galapagos Islands or not, but this seems likely, as no B-18s are known to have operated there. The unit did operate two Consolidated PBY-5 Catalinas from the Galapagos, on loan from the Navy.

The squadron's first wartime loss came in July 1942, when one of the fairly new LB-30s, homeward bound into the Galapagos from a routine patrol, crashed into the peak on Indefatigable Island, within a few minutes flying time of its home field. The entire 10-man crew was lost.

November 1942 also saw the 3rd BS receive a full allotment of new aircraft, when it exchanged its motley assortment of LB-30s and PBY-5s for seven "new" Consolidated B-24D Liberators (as well as at least two B-17Es, although these had disappeared by February when three more B-24Ds arrived), although at least three LB-30s remained on strength with the squadron as late as March 1943 (together with a solitary Piper L-4A Grasshopper (probably 42-36727). Between 13 and 27 March, the unit was effectively stood down, as its B-24Ds had been transferred to another unit and the unit was left with but one (unserviceable) LB-30, and the L-4A and "no missions" were flown.

On 18 February 1943, an entire squadron (minus aircraft and equipment), consisting of 56 officers and 320 other ranks, landed at Cristobal, in the Canal Zone. The unit which arrived at Cristobal had no designation, and was simply known to its members as "X" Squadron. These men were soon to become the "new" 3rd Bomb Squadron on 12 March 1943, these crews were moved by air and convoy to David Army Airfield, Panama, where they took over the designation and equipment of the 3rd Bombardment Squadron (Heavy). In turn, the personnel who had, up to this time, been the former members of the unit moved to Anton Army Airfield and took up the designation 29th Bombardment Squadron. It was a literal exchange of station and designation between two units that has not heretofore been recorded.

The 3rd BSs stay at David was short-lived, as it was off again to distant shores, this time, with its fresh complement of personnel, to Talara Airfield, Peru, (to replace the 397th Bombardment Squadron (H)). After three or four days unpacking at Talara, General Brett arrived at Talara and ordered the unit to move to Salinas Airfield, Ecuador to relieve the 25th Bomb Squadron there. Accordingly, the squadron arrived at Salinas "in complete exasperation" as one veteran put it on 26 May. The unit had, around 29 May 1943, traded four of its RLB-30s for 11 B-17Es (which were described as being in "a very run-down condition", although, in fact, two of these B-17Es were officially described as "on loan" to the 74th Bombardment Squadron at the time) but, as the 'new' members of the 3rd Bomb Squadron had been originally trained on B-17s, they were "very, very happy" to get them. The unit also had two Northrop A-17s (35-132 and 35-138) by this time.

Unbelievably, the unit was returned to Talara Airfield by 16 June (although the "Official" USAF history says the unit was at David on 11 June 1943. On 14 July 1943, one of the B-17E's crashed on landing at David Airfield killing all 12 aboard. The unit continued to participate in the never ending Pacific patrols but did, in fact, return to David again, starting on 11 July 1943 (by air, aided by three aircraft of the hard-working 20th Troop Carrier Squadron) the only tactical unit there at the time. The two unit "hack" Northrop A-17s had not quite made it back from Salinas, as they experienced mechanical difficulty at Cali Airport, Colombia, where they remained as late as 7 August 1943, although they were finally recovered by 13 September.

From this time on, the unit became, essentially, a sort of Operational Training Unit (OTU) for VI Bomber Command. Starting in August 1943, groups of Navigation Cadets were assigned for training while, during the same month, six of the unit's B-17Es were ordered to Guatemala City to assist the 74th Bomb Squadron in its patrols missions from there, remaining TDY for six weeks. This left the unit, still nominally at David, with but four B-17Es.

The unit claimed its one-and-only contact with the enemy between 6 and 11 December 1943, when a single B-17E from the squadron, deployed and operating in conjunction with Navy and other Sixth Air Force units, reported "contact" with a submarine, although the results of the subsequent attack have not been located.

Patrols from David continued into 1944, but on 6 April after trading in its remaining four tired B-17Es for four arguably equally tired B-24Ds, the unit moved, this time by air and truck convoy, to the relative luxury of Howard Field, Canal Zone, where it apparently received additional aircraft, as the unit had eight B-24Ds by 1 July. Aircraft strength fluctuated somewhat from then until the end of the year, and the unit moved again (to Rio Hato) on 26 April 1944, and, with 12 B-24Ds on hand as of October (of which 83% were airworthy), by 8 December, the unit was again at David with 11 B-24Ds.

The unit had suffered a blow to efficiency when, in June 1944, 72 of its most skilled mechanics and enlisted crew members were reassigned to the US for further reassignment to more active war theaters. This came at a particularly difficult time, as, during the same month, a resurgence of German submarine activity in the Caribbean resulted in Sixth Air Force ordering two 3rd BS B-24Ds to move to France Field to assist Navy patrols in anti-submarine missions. One aircraft from the squadron (aided by aircraft from Navy and other Sixth Air Force units) flew coordinated patrols while further detached at distant Hato Field, Curaçao. While no definitive submarine attacks were made, there were many "suspicious" radar contacts.

By December 1944, the unit was officially described as "a training unit for combat crews" and returned again, briefly, to David, while the runway at Rio Hato was being repaired, but operational training continued.

The squadron returned to David on 25 January 1945 and, still equipped with the tired old B-24Ds, suffered its last loss of the war on 23 May 1945 when 42-40962 was lost at sea with but one survivor. Shortly after this unfortunate incident, the unit turned in its surviving 10 B-24Ds to the Panama Air Depot in exchange for seven "used" B-24Js and three brand-new B-24Ms, although two of the best B-24Ds were retained for a time.

For the remainder of the war, the squadron continued as a bomber crew training unit, and in May 1945 its remaining personnel were sent to the United States. The squadron was kept on the books until November 1946 unmanned and unequipped until formally inactivated on 1 November.

=== Strategic Air Command ===
Reactivated as the 129th Strategic Reconnaissance Squadron and assigned to the federalized Pennsylvania Air National Guard 111th Strategic Reconnaissance Group at Fairchild AFB, Washington in 1951. Functioned as the operational flying component of the group (later wing) which was acting as a filler for the 92nd Bombardment Wing whose pilots and crews were deployed to Far East Air Force during the Korean War.

The squadron operated RB-29 Superfortress, very long range reconnaissance aircraft, for a 17-month period of activation, flying Ferret missions around the Soviet Pacific coast and in the Bearing Straits. Assets reassigned to 99th Strategic Reconnaissance Wing on 1 January 1953; squadron inactivated when the 111th SRW was returned to state control.

=== Lineage ===
- Constituted 3rd Bombardment Squadron on 1 January 1938

Redesignated 3rd Bombardment Squadron (Medium) on 22 December 1939
Activated on 1 February 1940
Redesignated 3rd Bombardment Squadron (Heavy) on 20 November 1940
Inactivated on 1 November 1946

- Redesignated 129th Strategic Reconnaissance Squadron (Medium, Photographic) on 24 July 1951.

Activated on 1 August 1951
Redesignated: 129th Strategic Reconnaissance Squadron (Medium) on 16 June 1952
Redesignated: 129th Strategic Reconnaissance Squadron (Heavy) on 16 October 1952
Inactivated on 1 January 1953

=== Assignments ===
- 6th Bombardment Group, 1 February 1940
- VI Bomber Command, 1 November 1943 – 1 November 1946
- 111th Strategic Reconnaissance Group (Federalized Pennsylvania Air National Guard), 1 August 1951
- 111th Strategic Reconnaissance Wing, 16 June 1952 – 1 January 1953.

=== Stations ===
- France Field, Canal Zone, 1 February 1940
- Rio Hato AAB, Panama, c. 8 December 1941
- Seymour Island Army Airfield, Baltra, Galápagos Islands, 4 May 1942
- David Field, Panama, 12 March 1943
- Talara Afld, Peru, c. 1 April 1943
- Salinas Afld, Ecuador, 23 May 1943
- David Field, Panama, 11 June 1943
- Howard Field, Canal Zone, 6 April 1944
- Rio Hato AAB, Panama, c. 26 August 1944
- David Field, Panama, 8 December 1944
- Rio Hato AAB, Panama, 19 October 1945 – 1 November 1946
- Fairchild AFB, Washington, 1 August 1951 – 1 January 1953.

=== Aircraft ===
- B-18 Bolo, 1940–1942
- LB-30 (B-24A) Liberator, 1942–1943
- B-17 Flying Fortress, 1942, 1943
- B-24 Liberator, 1942–1943; 1944–1946
- B/RB-29 Superfortress, 1951–1952

=== Heraldry ===
On a blue disc within a white and black border a demolition bomb endwise, entwined with a bushmaster (snake) in front of a cloud proper. (Approved 10 April 1941)
