= 970th Airborne Air Control Squadron =

970th Airborne Air Control Squadron

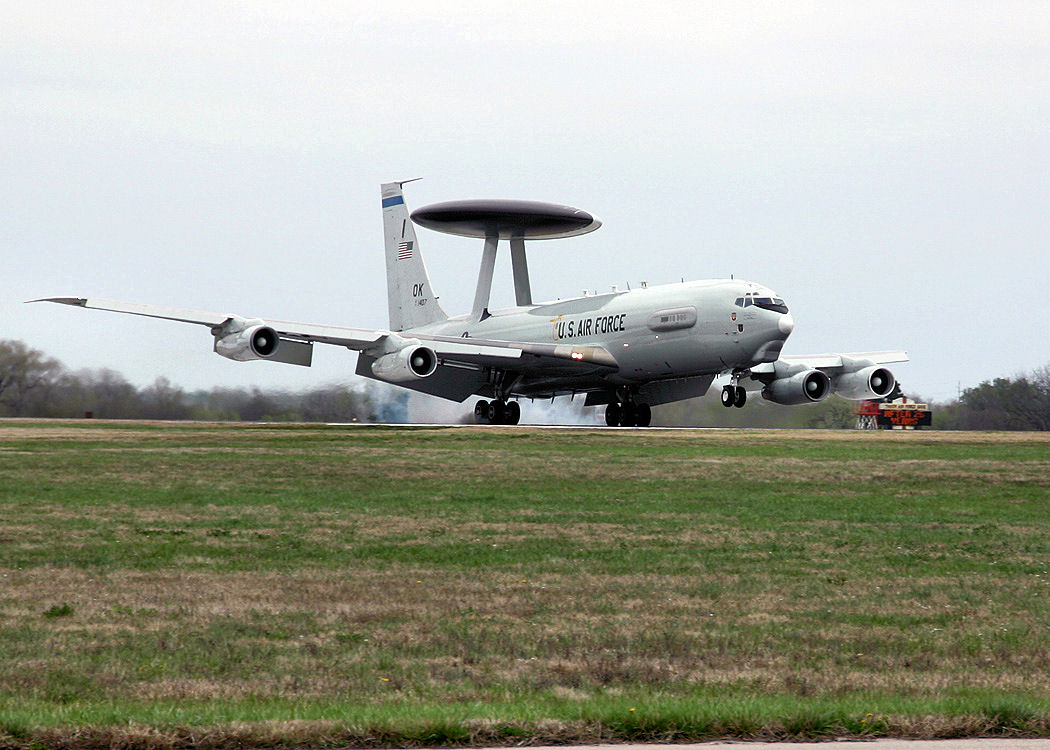
- Squadron E-3 Sentry landing at Tinker Air Force Base
- Active: 1941–1946; 1951–1953; 1966–1973; 1996–present
- Country: United States
- Branch: United States Air Force
- Role: Airborne Command and Control
- Part of: Air Force Reserve Command
- Garrison/HQ: Tinker Air Force Base
- Nicknames: Thumper; Antique Airlines(1966-1973)
- Engagements: American Theater of Operations; Vietnam War; War on terror
- Decorations: Presidential Unit Citation; Air Force Outstanding Unit Award with Combat "V" Device; Air Force Aoutstanding unit Award; Republic of Vietnam Gallantry Cross with Palm

Insignia
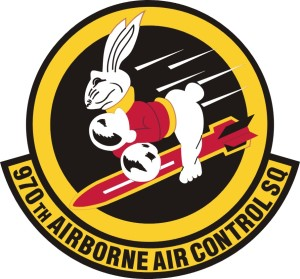
- 970th Airborne Air Control Squadron emblem (Note: Approved for the 29th Bombardment Squadron on 29 April 1942. Revived for the 970th Airborne Air Control Squadron, redrawn in September 2001. Description: On a black disc bordered in yellow a white "Pugnacious Hare" outlined in black, wearing white boxing gloves marked with black and a red turtle-necked jersey with yellow band at neck and waist, standing in a fighting stance on a red aerial bomb bordered in yellow and white speed flashes and red and black fins.)

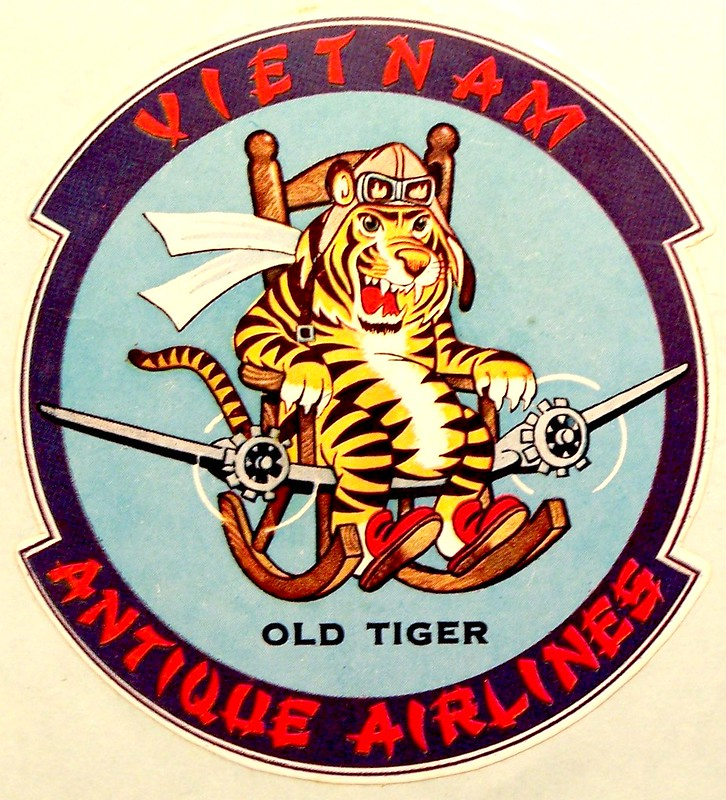
- 360th Tactical Electronic Warfare Squadron emblem (Note: Used by the squadron in Vietnam. Formal approval unknown.)
- Vietnam War Tail Code: AJ

The 970th Airborne Air Control Squadron is part of the 513th Air Control Group at Tinker Air Force Base, Oklahoma. It operates the Boeing E-3 Sentry aircraft conducting airborne command and control missions.

The first predecessor of the squadron was the 29th Bombardment Squadron, which was activated in Puerto Rico in April 1941. The squadron flew antisubmarine patrols in the Caribbean Sea and eastern Pacific Ocean in defense of the Panama Canal during World War II. It was inactivated in Panama in November 1946. It was reactivated during the Korean War as the 130th Strategic Reconnaissance Squadron, but was inactivated in January 1953 and transferred its personnel and equipment to another unit.

The 360th Tactical Electronic Warfare Squadron, the squadron's second predecessor, monitored and located enemy radio transmitters and conducted psychological warfare operations in South Vietnam, Cambodia, and Laos from 1966 to 1972. With the withdrawal of American forces from Southeast Asia, it returned to the united States, where it was inactivated in July 1972.

In 1985, the two squadrons were consolidated. After the consolidated unit was redesignated as the '970th Airborne Air Control Squadron, it was activated as a reserve associate unit of the 552nd Air Control Wing in 1996. It has trained for and flown air control missions since then.

== Mission ==
The 513th Air Control Group's mission is to provide theater and Air Force commanders with trained aircrews and maintenance personnel and systems for airborne surveillance, warning and control of U.S. and allied military aircraft. The 970th is the flying organization of the 513th. It performs aircrew training and operations functions. Reserve Boeing E-3 Sentry aircrew members fly the same type sorties as their active-duty counterparts to remain proficient and combat ready.

== History ==
=== World War II ===
==== Activation and operations in the Eastern Caribbean ====
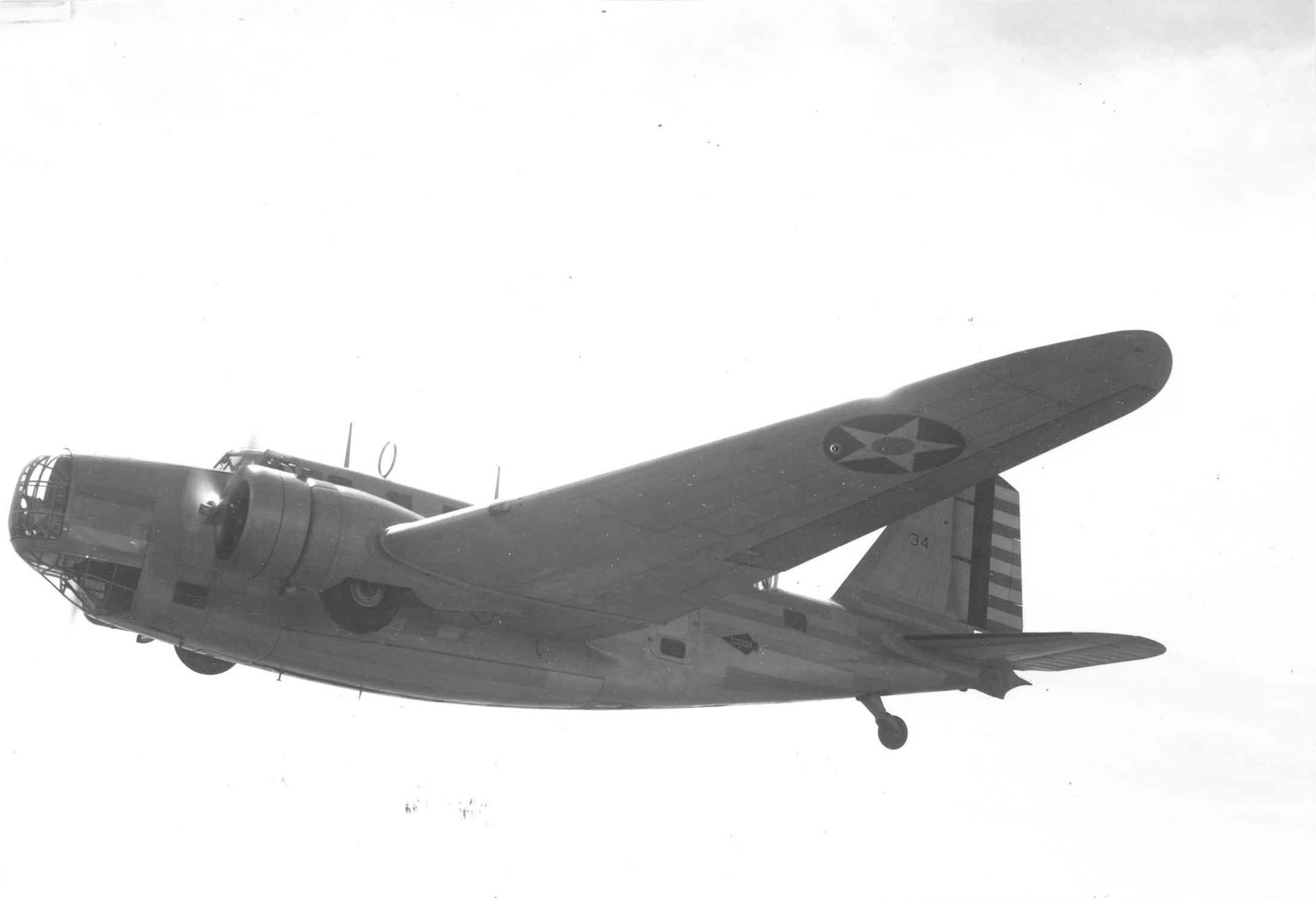
Douglas B-18, initial squadron aircraft

The first predecessor of the squadron, the 29th Bombardment Squadron, was activated on 1 April 1941, at Borinquen Field, along with the 44th and 45th Bombardment Squadron as one of the original squadrons of the 40th Bombardment Group. The squadron drew its flying cadre from the 25th Bombardment Group and most of its ground personnel from the 24th Air Base Group. It was equipped with Douglas B-18 Bolo aircraft with a mission of defending the eastern approaches to the Panama Canal. It flew training missions in the Eastern Caribbean until the Japanese attack on Pearl Harbor on 7 December 1941, they began flying antisubmarine patrol missions. In June 1942, the 40th Group and its squadrons departed Puerto Rico for bases in Central America. The 29th Squadron arrived at its new station, Aguadulce Army Air Field, Panama on 16 June 1942.

==== Reinforcement by Squadron "X" ====
Late in November 1942, Squadron "X" was organized at Davis-Monthan Field, Arizona. Squadron "X" consisted of 320 enlisted men and 55 officers drawn from the 61st Bombardment Squadron, an Operational Training Unit (OTU). The squadron departed Davis-Monthan for Camp Harahan, near New Orleans, Louisiana, sailing on the USAT John L. Clem on 22 March 1943. Twelve days later, the squadron disembarked at Colon, Canal Zone, Squadron "X" proceeded to Aguadulce, where its personnel replaced the personnel of the 29th Squadron, taking over the 29th's equipment and planes. The personnel of the 29th Squadron moved to Guatemala City, where they replaced those of the 74th Bombardment Squadron. The flight crew members of the 29th were sent to (OTU) at Rio Hato Army Air Base, Panama in late February and early March for transition in Consolidated LB-30 Liberators, Boeing B-17 Flying Fortresses, and Consolidated B-24D Liberators.

==== Deployment to the Galapagos Islands ====
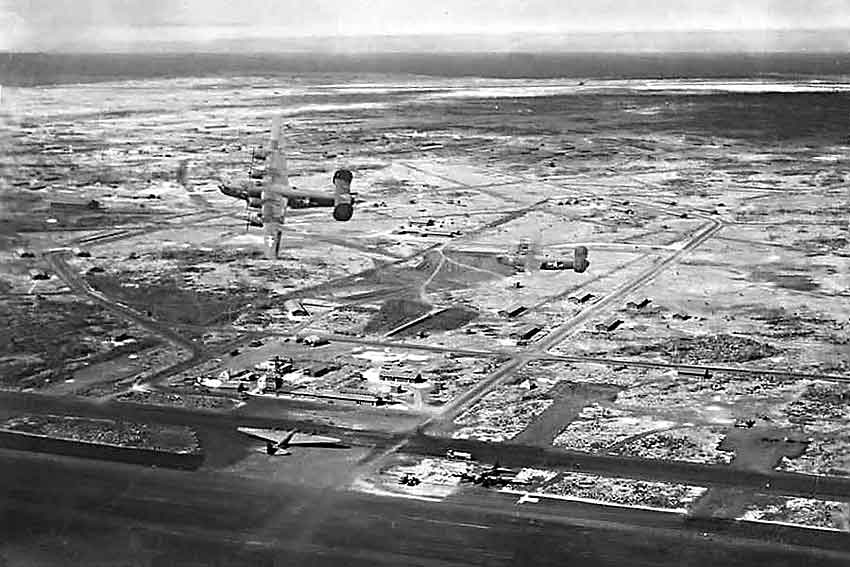
B-24 near the airfield on Baltra Island

On 12 May 1943, the squadron, excepting three crews, embarked on the USAT Frederick C. Johnson and headed for the Galapagos Islands. The three crews flew to the "Rock" on 13 May 1943. The USAT Johnson arrived at Seymour Bay, Galapagos Islands on 15 May 1943. The Rock, also called "Beta", was an airfield on Baltra Island. From 16 May until 23 May 1943, the 29th Squadron flew patrols with enlisted crew members from the 45th Bombardment Squadron. Patrols were flown from the Galapagos Islands to Guatemala City and back. The 74th Bombardment Squadron flew alternate routes with the 29th. Simultaneously, the squadron was reassigned to the 6th Bombardment Group, which became the only remaining group of VI Bomber Command.

On 8 July 1943, three crews were sent to Vernam Air Force Base, Jamaica to shadow the USS Yorktown (CV-10) and its escort of three destroyers. Enemy submarine activity in the area prompted this action for the protection of the ships, which were en route to the Canal. The aircraft returned to Guatemala City on 11 July 1943.

From 24 July 1943 until 25 August 1943, VP-206 took over combat patrols initiating from the Galapagos. The 29th resumed patrol duties on 25 August 1943 when the Navy was ordered to the Atlantic side. On the same day, squadron aircraft began rotating to the depot at San Antonio, Texas to update the radar equipment installed in squadron aircraft. All of the squadron aircraft were equipped by 19 January 1944. On 1 November 1943, headquarters of the 6th Bombardment Group, which had been operating as a single headquarters with VI Bomber Command was disbanded, and the squadron was assigned directly to VI Bomber Command.

The first fatal crash involving a 29th Squadron aircraft happened on 15 October 1943. Three B-24s from the 29th were ordered-to the area to search for a missing Consolidated PBY Catalina . One B-24 flew to Cocos Island to survey the island for the missing PBY. During the search this B-24 was not heard from after reporting in at 1500 GCT. Three Navy Martin PBM Mariners and two B-24s searched was the area beginning on 16 October 1943. A life raft was sighted by one of the PBMs and also by a 29th B-24. On 23 October 1943 Lt. W.R. Knight deviated from his patrol to scan Cocos Island which had been "closed in" during the search. On passing over the island, wreckage was sighted, located near the crest of the highest peak on the west side of the island. On 2 November 1943, a ground rescue party reached the site of the crash. The crew of the downed B-24 were posthumously awarded the Soldiers Medal for their actions in searching for the downed PBY.

On 24 November 1943 twelve planes of the squadron were on a mission to make simulated attacks against United States Navy ships. The weather grew worse and they were ordered to David Field. The squadron was then ordered to Rio Hato and were briefed on enemy submarines on the Atlantic side, that had sunk ships that day. Search patterns were laid out to be flown the following day. During the briefing, Lt. Sumnicht stated his crew were on a search of the sinkings and damaged an enemy submarine. They had broken through a cloud layer to discover a surfaced submarine below them. The sub immediately began to dive. Although the plane's bomb bay doors would not open on the first run. The plane circled, and dropped six 650-pound depth charges in front of the wake. Though not claiming to have sunk the U-boat, although it must have suffered damage. For the next few days all tracks of the search area were flown without a sign of the sub or further attacks. On 10 December 1943 the squadron resumed flying from one to four patrol lanes. The "Loop" plan, dating back to July 1943 was flown. The lanes were of a giant rectangular shape, all planes returning to the "Rock". The average patrol covered about 1100 miles and a flight time of 7 1/2–8 hours. This patrol system was used until the Navy again took over patrol coverage on 4 February 1944.

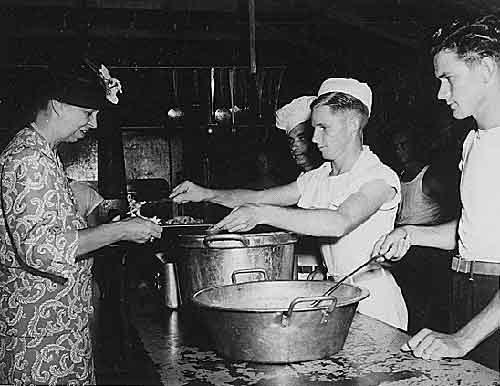
Eleanor Roosevelt eats with the troops in the Galapagos Islands

On 31 March 1944, Eleanor Roosevelt arrived at the base. She was greeted and selected food from the mess. A group of enlisted members answered all questions asked by Mrs. Roosevelt. The evening of her arrival an informal reception in her honor was held at the Officers Club where she mixed with the officers and civilian workers. The next morning she visited Mess Hall #1, eating from a G.I. mess kit and cup, mixing with the troops.

During March 1944 the unit helped rescued a disabled seaman from a tanker off the coast of San Cristóbal Island. A crash boat was sent to intercept the tanker and take the sick man aboard. A squadron B-24 to was sent to guide the boat to the tanker. It picked up the tanker on radar, then headed back to the crash boat, directing them to take up a corrected heading for the tanker. We then flew back to the tanker to get it to head towards the crash boat, which took the sick crewman aboard.

==== Move to Howard Field ====
In April 1944, VI Bomber Command realigned all heavy bombardment squadrons in the command. As a result, the 29th Bombardment Squadron moved from the Galapagos Island to Howard Field in the Panama Canal Zone. Beginning 10 April, the air echelon plus key personnel, were ferried to Howard in B-24's. Approximately 180 enlisted men sailed by boat the same week. By 16 April 1944 the entire squadron had moved to Howard Field.

On 17 April 1944, Maj. Ford stationed at Howard Field, took off with a passenger in a Vultee L-1 Vigilant for Cape Mala to arrange for the payment of personnel at remote sites. Late that afternoon he was not heard from and three B-24s of the 29th searched the area south and west of Cape Mala, but the visibility was near zero and they had no success. The following day, three more B-24s from the squadron searched to the south and east of Cape Mala with negative results. Maj. Ford and his passenger, was rescued by a boat shortly after a forced landing and taken to Nicaragua.

While stationed in the Canal Zone, the squadron participated in a number of mock attacks. On 28 April 1944 all B-24s available from the squadron staged a surprise attack on the locks of the Panama Canal. Flights of two and three planes were assigned various tracks. The last attack, on 7 June 1944, came closer to actual combat conditions. B-24s from the squadrons assembled over Rio Hato, climbed on course to David to an altitude of 20,000 feet. From there all planes, in formation, crossed the Isthmus to the Atlantic side, and through a 90% cloud cover, struck the Gatun Locks and the Madden Dam. The squadron also conducted exercise attacks against Navy forces. On 30 November 1944, three planes from the 29th piloted completed a successful mission against a naval force, which included the USS Nevada (BB-36). On 22 January 1945, the 29th and 3d Bombardment Squadrons engaged in a mission, with the 3d in the lead. Radar of the lead plane was inoperative and a plane from the 29th established visual contact with the USS Shangri-La (CV-38) and the formation completed its bomb run without interception from carrier planes.

On 5 May 1944 the squadron replaced the 20th Troop Carrier Squadron in the transporting freight, mail, and passengers to outlying bases. The schedule ceased on 10 May 1944, began again and continued until 21 May 1944. B-24s from the squadron stopped at the following bases: San Juan, Aruba, Curaçao, Managua, San Jose, Guatemala City, Salinas, Talara, and the Galapagos Islands.

The arrival of submarines in the Caribbean area, and the torpedoing of three ships on 5 July 1944, resulted in the alerting of the 29th Bomb Squadron and antisubmarine patrols flown from France Field. Numerous disappearing radar contacts were encountered, indicating that several submarines were covering the area from 400 to within 100 miles of the Canal. On 11 July 1944, an enemy submarine was sighted by a ship heading for the Canal. Patrols were flown by the Navy around the "Hot Spot" the remainder of the day and throughout the evening. The B-24s continued the search the following day without success. Six B-24s were dispatched to Vernam Field, Jamaica to continue the anti submarine operations. Eight B-24s continued to patrol from Howard Field, four from Curaçao, and two from France Field. These patrols were flown daily until 17 July 1944 when the search was discontinued.

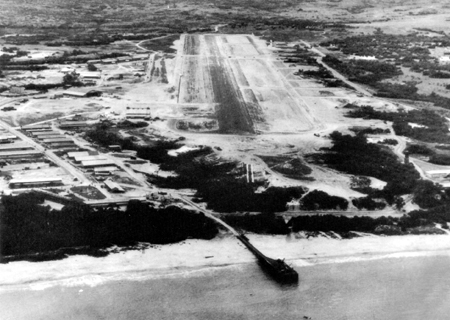
Airfield at Rio Hato Panama

The 29th Bomb Squadron moved from Rio Hato, where it had been stationed since September 1944, back to Howard Field on 8 December 1944, because the runway at Rio Hato had become unserviceable. The remainder of the month was devoted to training, both flying and ground classes. On 1 and 2 January 1945, the squadron went on Practice Full Alert. Panamanian newspapers and news magazines from the U.S. indicated the alert was occasioned by unsettled Panamanian political conditions. On 27 January 1945, the squadron returned from Howard Field to Rio Hato, whose runway had been sufficiently repaired for use, although construction continued.

On 23 February 1945, squadron was placed on a red alert, indicating danger of air and ground attack. It was learned the following morning that the alert was called because of political activity in Panama. The alert was canceled at 1200 hours on 24 February 1945. On 6 March 1945, the squadron participated in a "Search Light Mission" over the Canal Zone with seven aircraft.

==== Return to the Galapagos ====
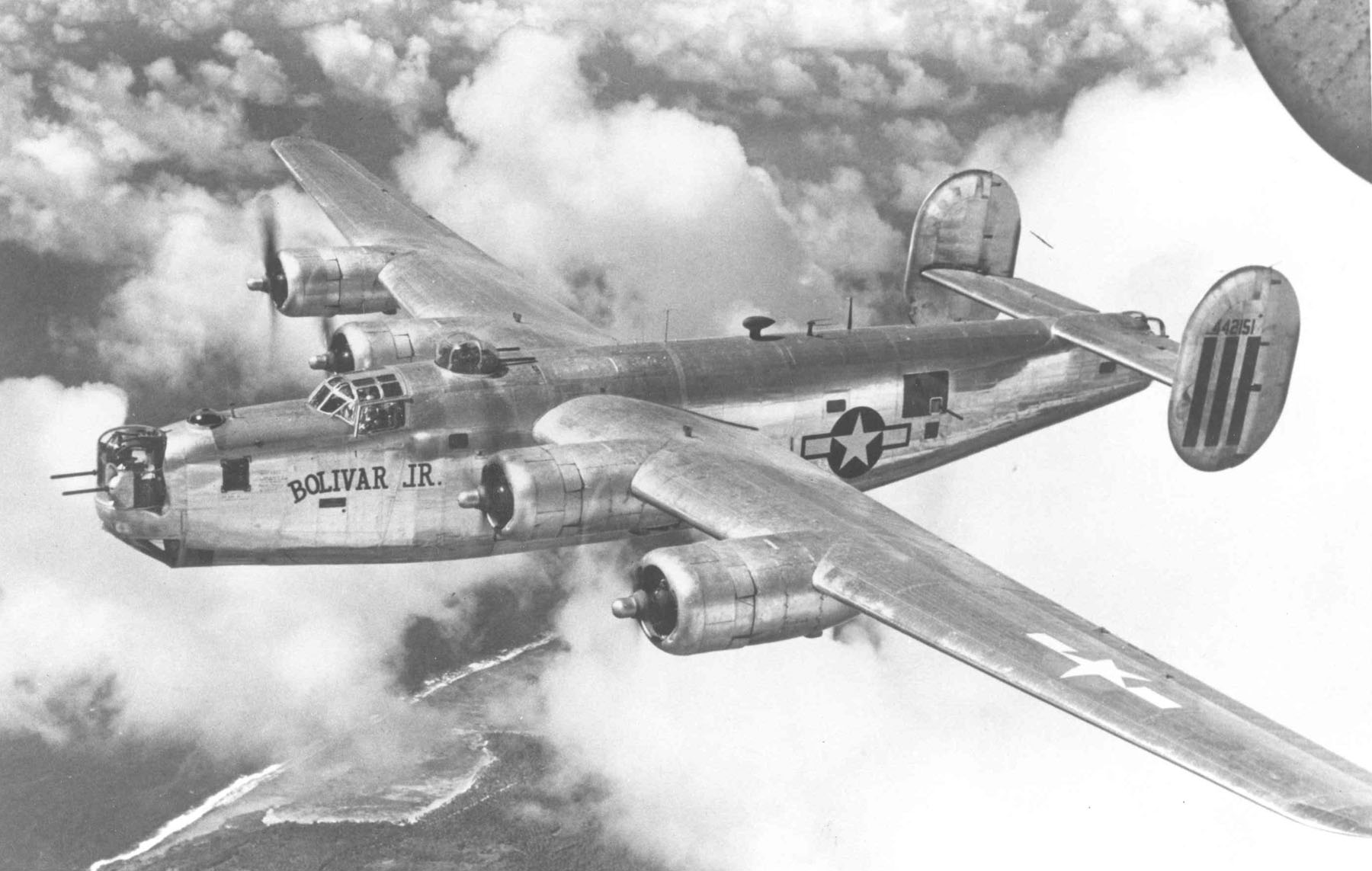
B-24M

In April 1945, the squadron was ordered to return to the Galapagos Islands. On 26 April, an advance party departed from Rio Hato. 49 officers and 94 enlisted men who left Rio Hato in 12 B-24Js and B-24Ls and arrived at Seymour Island on 30 April 1945. Five officers and 156 enlisted men left Balboa by ship to Seymour Island arriving at the island on 3 May 1945.

On 21 May 1945, a B-24 was reported missing. The aircraft had taken off on a local training flight. The plane was last seen by another squadron plane in the area of San Cristóbal Island. The squadron requested base operations to attempt to get a radar fix on the missing plane if possible and the Navy ground radio station was requested to monitor the emergency frequency. Five squadron planes were sent out to search all islands in the Galapagos area except Culpepper and Wenmon. Three of the planes circled San Cristobal Island. A Curtiss C-46 Commando arriving from the Canal Zone to assisted in the search which ended at dusk. On 22 May 1945, the search continued from dawn to dusk. B-24s, a Douglas C-47 Skytrain and navy aircraft all were involved in the search. On 23 May 1945, the search was resumed at dawn. A North American O-47 examined San Cristobal Island. Oxygen bottles and one survivor were sighted at Bahia Rosa Blanca. A C-47 dropped supplies and equipment and found another survivor about 1/4-mile from the first.

A Navy crash boat departed the base. The second survivor appeared to be badly injured so the crash boat was directed to him. His injuries were serious so a Navy PBM Mariner was requested to come to the scene to evacuate him. On 24 May 1945, a ground party continued the search. After further search with no positive results, the search was terminated on 25 May 1945.

==== Drawdown and inactivation ====
On 11 July, the last three B-24s to be assigned to the squadron arrived at the base. These were B-24M models, painted black underneath and were in the very last group of B-24s made. These planes were produced by the Ford Motor Company.

On 18 August 1945 the squadron received telegram concerning a missing B-17 in the Salinas, Ecuador area. The squadron was asked to send aircraft for search. The B-17 was found by Ecuadorians where it had crashed into a mountain.

On 27 September 1945 the squadron was advised that it will move to Rio Hato within a few weeks. The air echelon was to move out on 2 October and ground echelon will remain to aid in preparing equipment for shipment to depots. On 30 September 1945 most men received discharge orders and the squadron ceased functioning as an operating unit. The air portion of the squadron began to move out on 2 October 1945 to Rio Hato so the above was the last Official History written at the Galapagos Islands. The 29th converted from B-24s to B-17s. The pilots who flew them down flew the 29th's B-24s back to the States. Instead most of the crews returned on the Liberty ship, S.S. General Blanchard (possibly the USS General H. B. Freeman (AP-143) and the 29th was inactivated on 1 November 1946.

=== Korean War ===
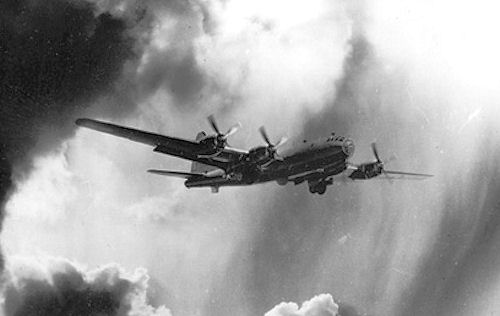
RB-29 as flown by the 130th Squadron

On 1 April 1951, the 111th Bombardment Wing of the Pennsylvania Air National Guard, a light bomber unit equipped with Douglas B-26 Invaders was mobilized for service. Nine days later, the wing, its operations group, and support units moved to Fairchild Air Force Base, Washington. However, only its 103d Bombardment Squadron moved to Fairchild with the wing, while its other two bombardment squadrons moved to Langley Air Force Base, Virginia, where they established a combat crew training school for B-26 crews.

Strategic Air Command (SAC) determined to convert the 111th Wing into a reconnaissance unit and to equip it with Boeing RB-29 Superfortresses. To bring the wing up to strength, on 1 August 1951, the squadron, now designated the 130th Strategic Reconnaissance Squadron was activated. (Note: Despite being numbered in the block of numbers reserved for Air National Guard units (101-300), the squadron remained a regular air force unit. In 1955, the 130th Troop Carrier Squadron was activated in the West Virginia Air National Guard with the same number, but it is not related to this squadron.) The squadron was redesignated as a heavy unit in October 1952 in anticipation of converting to the Convair RB-36 Peacemaker, but on 1 January 1953, its parent wing was returned to state control and replaced by the 99th Strategic Reconnaissance Wing. As a result, the squadron was inactivated and transferred its personnel and equipment to the 348th Strategic Reconnaissance Squadron, which was activated in its place.

=== Vietnam War ===
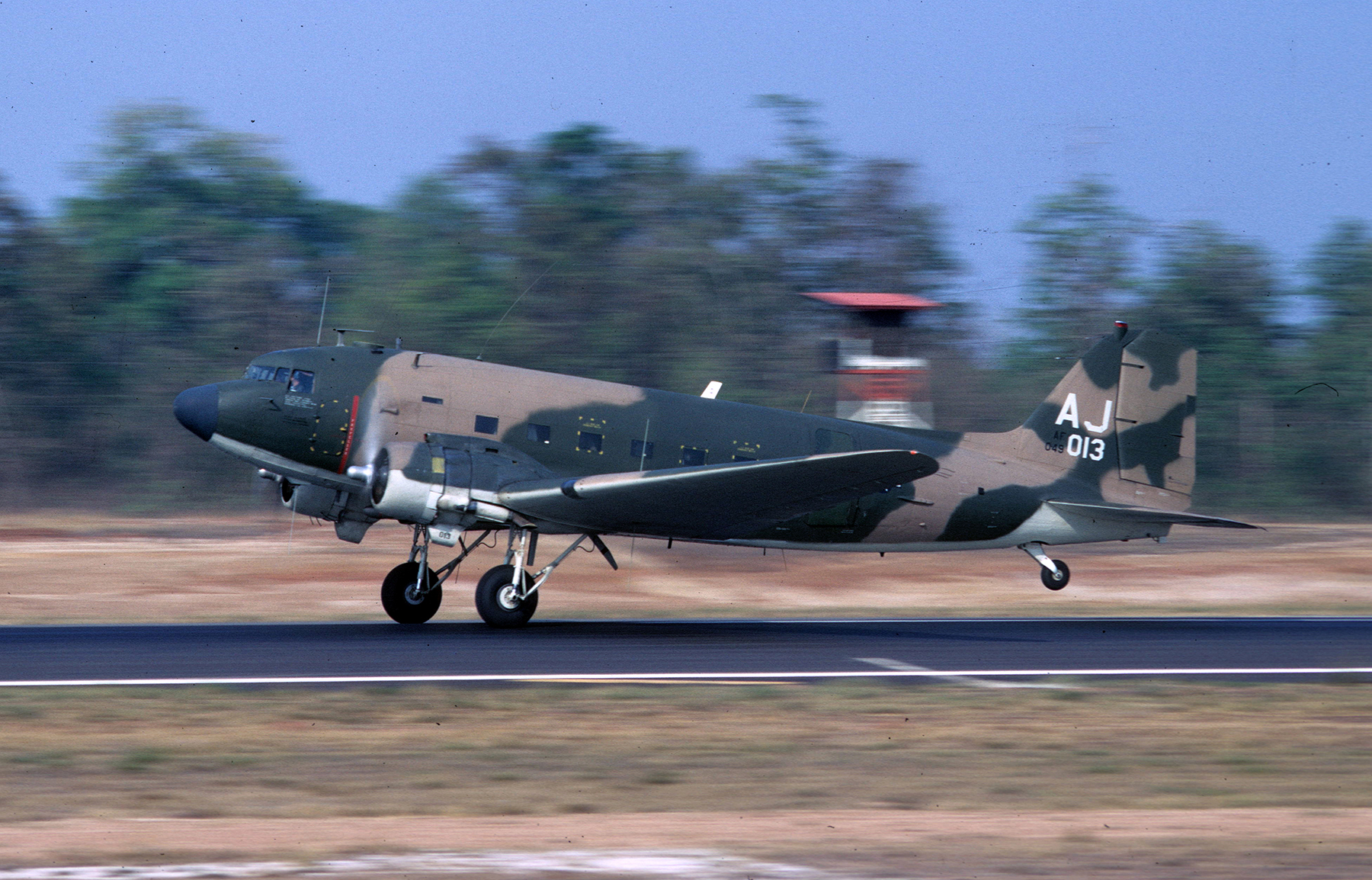
Squadron EC-47 taking off in Vietnam (Note: Aircraft is Douglas EC-47P Skytrain, serial 43-49013. Built as a Douglas C-47B-10-DK, modified as a VC-47D, then as an RC-47P (later EC-47P). It was transferred to the VNAF in November 1972. Baugher, Joe (1 September 2023). "1943 USAF Serial Numbers". Joe Baugher.)

In January 1966, Military Assistance Command Vietnam expressed a requirement for airborne radio direction finding (ARDF) to intercept enemy radio traffic to locate enemy units. That month, the Air Force began Project Phyllis Ann, which modified 35 Douglas C-47 Skytrains by installing AN/ARD-18 direction finding equipment in them..

The squadron's second predecessor, the 360th Reconnaissance Squadron, was organized at Tan Son Nhut Airport, Republic of Viet Nam in April 1966, where it was assigned to the 460th Tactical Reconnaissance Wing and equipped with RC-47 aircraft equipped for ARDF. The 6994th Security Squadron operated the planes' direction finding equipment.

In the spring of 1967, the squadron was redesignated the 360th Tactical Electronic Warfare Squadron and its RC-47 aircraft became EC-47s. Its mission equipment changed its name from AN/ARD-18 to AN/ALR-34, (Note: Under the Army Navy (AN/) system for naming electronics systems by platform/system/purpose, ARD stood for Aircraft Radio Detection, while ALR stood for Aircraft Countermeasures Receiver. Martin, Year of the Offensive.) and Project Phyllis Ann became Project Compass Dart.

The squadron flew Phyllis Ann (later Compass Dart and Combat Cougar) missions using ARDF to locate enemy high frequency transmitters. On these missions, squadron aircraft frequently also dropped propaganda leaflets, in part to provide cover for their primary mission. The squadron also was equipped with two JC-47 aircraft which flew Operation Drill Press missions. In addition to members of the 6994th, linguists from the 6998th Security Squadron flew on these missions. Drill Press missions focused on encrypted radio transmissions in the area of the Vietnamese Demilitarized Zone and also covered the very high frequency spectrum. Until early 1967, the squadron also provided initial theater training for aircrews assigned to the 361st and 362d Tactical Electronic Warfare Squadrons.

During the 1968 Tet Offensive, Tan Son Nhut was attacked by North Vietnamese and Viet Cong forces, nine of the squadron's EC-47s were damaged, all by "indiscriminate" friendly fire responding to the attack, reducing the squadron to four serviceable aircraft.

The squadron continued this mission until November 1972, when it moved to Dyess Air Force Base, Texas with the withdrawal of United States forces from Southeast Asia. The following July, it moved to Hurlburt Field, Florida, where it was inactivated.

=== From the 1990s ===
In September 1985, the 130th and 360th Squadrons were consolidated into a single unit. The consolidated squadron was redesignated the 970th Airborne Air Control Squadron and activated at Tinker Air Force Base, Oklahoma, on 15 March 1996, becoming the first Air Combat Command associate flying squadron. The associate program merges reserve units with active-duty units. The program, which began in 1968, creates reserve units that share joint use of active-duty aircraft and equipment for training and work directly with active duty personnel. The flexibility of the associate program allows a reserve aircrew member to fly as part of an active-duty crew or with an all-reserve crew.

== Lineage ==
970th Airborne Air Control Squadron

- Constituted as the 29th Bombardment Squadron (Medium) on 22 November 1940

Activated on 1 April 1941
Redesignated 29th Bombardment Squadron (Heavy) on 7 May 1942
Redesignated 29th Bombardment Squadron, Heavy on 12 April 1944
Inactivated on 1 November 1946

- Redesignated 130th Strategic Reconnaissance Squadron, Medium, Photographic on 24 July 1951

Activated on 1 August 1951
Redesignated 130th Strategic Reconnaissance Squadron, Medium on 16 June 1952
Redesignated 130th Strategic Reconnaissance Squadron, Heavy on 16 October 1952
Inactivated on 1 January 1953

- Consolidated with the 360th Tactical Electronic Warfare Squadron as the 360th Tactical Electronic Warfare Squadron on 19 September 1985
- Redesignated 970th Airborne Warning and Control Squadron on 18 September 1985
- Redesignated: 970th Airborne Air Control Squadron on 7 March 1996

Activated in the reserve on 15 March 1996

360th Reconnaissance Squadron

- Constituted as the 360th Reconnaissance Squadron and activated on 4 April 1966 (not organized)

Organized on 8 April 1966
Redesignated 360th Tactical Electronic Warfare Squadron on 15 March 1967
Inactivated on 31 July 1973

- Consolidated with the 130th Strategic Reconnaissance Squadron on 19 September 1985

=== Assignments ===
- 40th Bombardment Group, 1 April 1941
- 6th Bombardment Group, 15 May 1943
- VI Bomber Command, 1 November 1943 – 1 November 1946
- 111th Strategic Reconnaissance Group, 1 August 1951
- 111th Strategic Reconnaissance Wing, 16 January 1952 – 1 January 1953
- 460th Tactical Reconnaissance Wing, 8 April 1966
- 483d Tactical Airlift Wing, 31 August 1971
- 377th Air Base Wing, 1 February 1972
- 463d Tactical Airlift Wing, 24 November 1972
- 1st Special Operations Wing, 1–31 July 1973
- 513th Air Control Group, 15 March 1996 – present

=== Stations ===
- Borinquen Field, Puerto Rico, 1 April 1941
- Aguadulce Army Air Field, Panama, 16 June 1942
- Anton Field, Panama, c. 29 March 1943
- Seymour Island Field, Baltra, Galapagos Islands, c. 13 May 1943
- Howard Field, Panama Canal Zone, c. 10 April 1944
- Rio Hato Army Air Base, Panama, 9 September 1944
- Howard Field, Panama Canal Zone, 8 December 1944
- Rio Hato Army Air Base, Panama, 27 January 1945
- Seymour Island Army Air Field, Galapagos Islands, 26 April 1945
- Rio Hato Army Air Base, Panama, c. 2 October 1945 – 1 November 1946
- Fairchild Air Force Base, Washington, 1 August 1951 – 1 January 1953
- Tan Son Nhut Airport (later Tan Son Nhut Air Base), South Vietnam, 8 April 1966 – 24 November 1972
- Dyess Air Force Base, Texas, 24 November 1972
- Hurlburt Field, Florida, 1–31 July 1973
- Tinker Air Force Base, Oklahoma, 15 March 1996 – present

=== Aircraft ===
- Douglas B-18 Bolo, 1941–1942
- Northrop A-17, 1942–1943
- Consolidated B-24 Liberator, 1943–1946
- Boeing RB-29 Superfortress, 1951–1952
- Douglas C-47 Skytrain, 1966–1972
- Douglas EC-47, 1966–1972
- Boeing E-3 Sentry, 1996–present
