= VI Bomber Command =

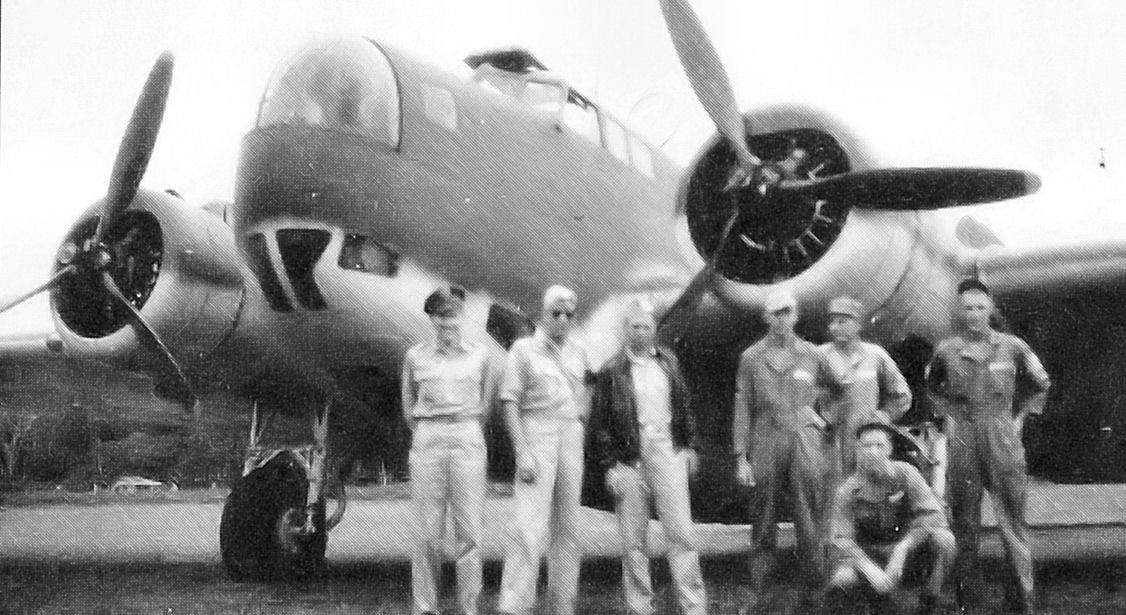
- VI Bomber Command B-18 Bolo on Trinidad in 1942
- Active: 1941–1946
- Country: United States
- Branch: United States Air Force
- Role: Command of bombardment units
- Motto: Alae Supra Canalem (Latin for 'Wings Over the Canal')
- Engagements: Antisubmarine Campaign (American Theater)

Insignia
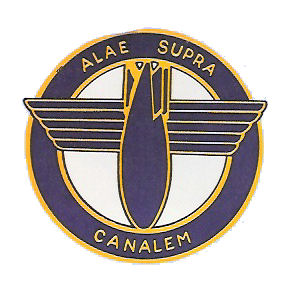
- VI Bomber Command emblem (Note: Approved 18 March 1942.)

The VI Bomber Command was a military formation of the United States Army Air Forces. Its last assignment was with Sixth Air Force. It was based throughout its service at Albrook Field, in the Panama Canal Zone. It was inactivated on 1 November 1946.

It engaged in antisubmarine operations from the Canal Zone. It was credited with two submarines sunk and shared two others.

== Lineage ==
- Constituted as the 6th Bomber Command on 17 October 1941 (Note: Maurer indicates that the unit was constituted as the "VI" Bomber Command. However, the unit was constituted and activated with an arabic number in its name. The use of roman numerals to designate Army Air Forces combat commands did not begin until September 1942. "Air Force Historical Research Agency Organizational Reconds: Types of USAF Organizations". Air Force History Index. 9 January 2008..)

Activated on 25 October 1941

- Redesignated VI Bomber Command c. 18 September 1942

Inactivated on 1 November 1946
Disbanded on 8 October 1948

=== Assignments ===
- Caribbean Air Force (later 6th Air Force, Sixth Air Force), 25 October 1941 – 1 November 1946

=== Components ===
Groups

- 6th Bombardment Group, 25 October 1941 – 1 November 1943
- 9th Bombardment Group, 25 October 1941 – 31 October 1942 (attached to VI Fighter Command after 28 January 1942)
- 25th Bombardment Group, 25 October 1941 – 6 April 1944
- 40th Bombardment Group, 25 October 1941 – 6 April 1942 (attached to 6th Interceptor Command after 15 January 1942); 22 June 1942 – 9 July 1943

Squadrons

- 3d Bombardment Squadron, 1 November 1943 – 1 November 1946
- 10th Bombardment Squadron, attached 13 December 1943, assigned 17 December 1943 - c. 9 May 44
- 29th Bombardment Squadron, 1 November 1943 – 1 November 1946
- 59th Bombardment Squadron, 25 October 1941 – 19 March 1943 (attached to Trinidad Detachment, VI Fighter Command after 21 July 1942)
- 74th Bombardment Squadron, 1 November 1943 – 1 November 1946
- 397th Bombardment Squadron, 1 November 1943 – 1 November 1946
