= Anton Field =

Defunct United States airfield in Coclé Province, Panama

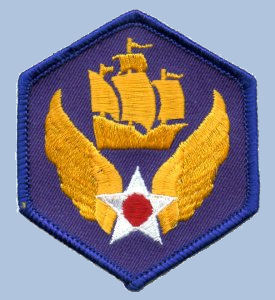
Anton Army Airfield
- Part of Sixth Air Force
- Located in Panama

Site information
- Type: Military Airfield
- Controlled by: United States Army Air Forces

Location
- Coordinates: 08°58′58.06″N 079°34′20.09″W

Site history
- In use: 1943

Anton Army Airfield was a former United States Army Air Forces World War II airfield in the Coclé Province near the southern coast of Panama. It was used as an auxiliary of Howard Field as part of the defense of the Panama Canal.

Wartime units assigned to the station were:

- 30th Fighter Squadron (XXVI Fighter Command), 3 January-10 February 1943 (P-40 Warhawk)
- 29th Bombardment Squadron (6th Bombardment Group), 29 March-13 May 1943 (Northrup A-17 Nomad)

Today there is little or no trace of the airfield.
