= 397th Bombardment Squadron =

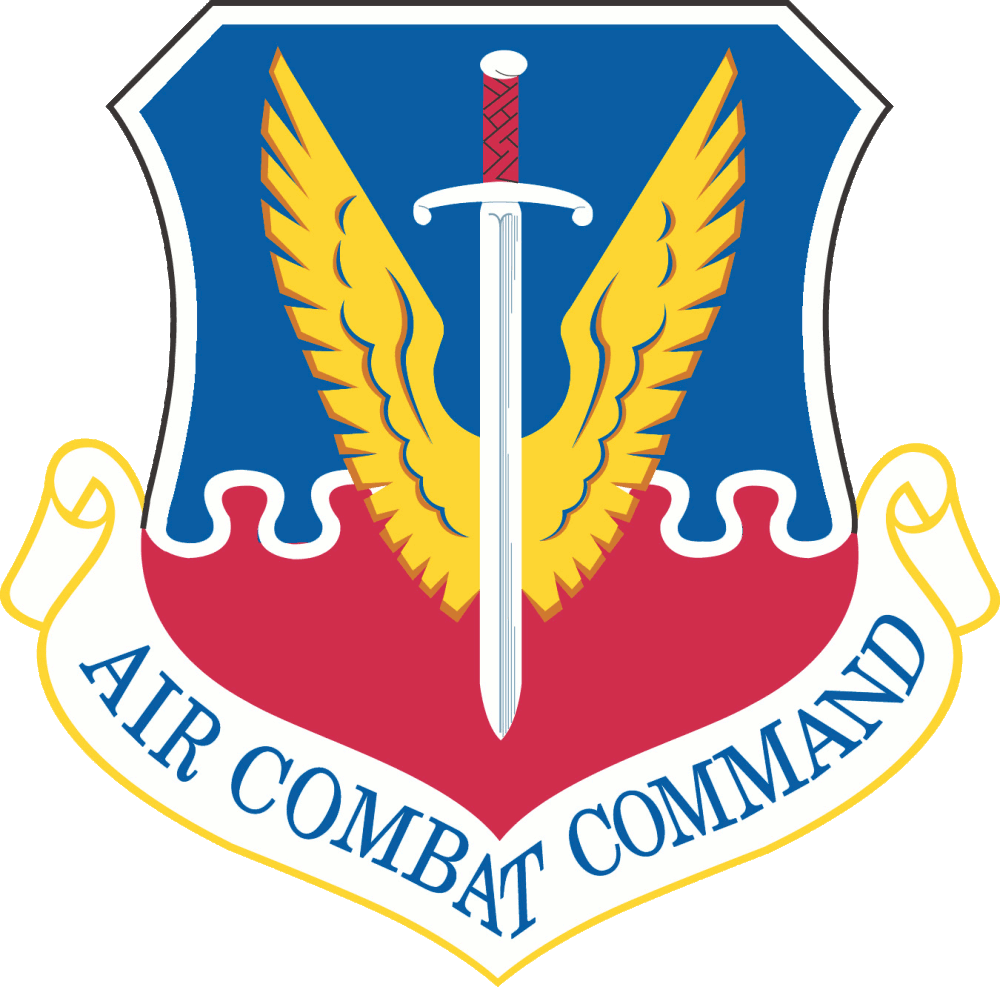
397th Bombardment Squadron 7th Reconnaissance Squadron

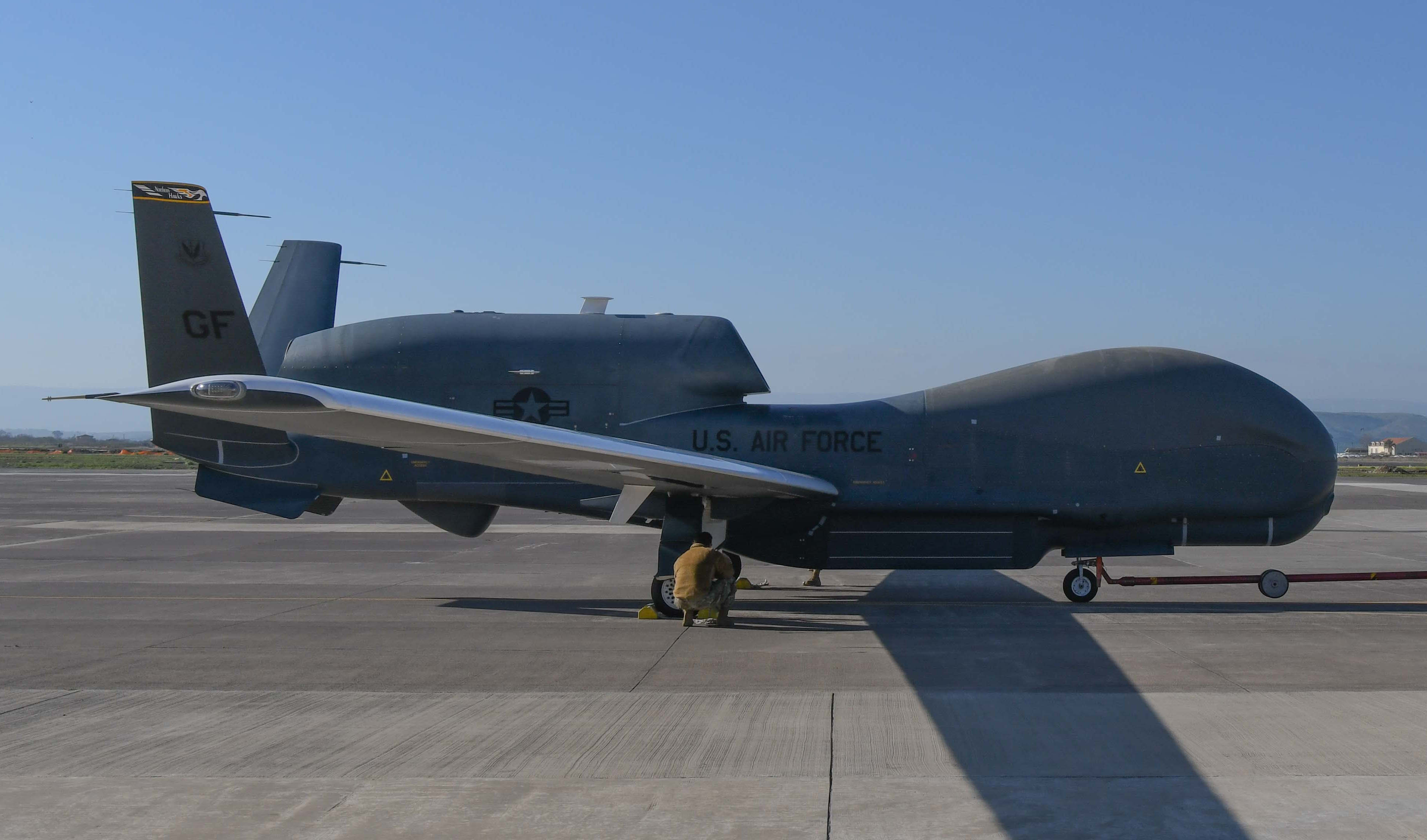
- RQ-4 Global Hawk Block 40 at NAS Sigonella
- Active: 1917–1946; 2015–present
- Country: United States
- Branch: United States Air Force
- Role: Reconnaissance
- Part of: Air Force Combat Command
- Garrison/HQ: Naval Air Station Sigonella
- Mascots: Brownie the Singing Dog and Tojo the Monkey (World War II)
- Engagements: Antisubmarine (American Theater)

Commanders
- Notable commanders: Henry H. Arnold; Harold H. George

Insignia
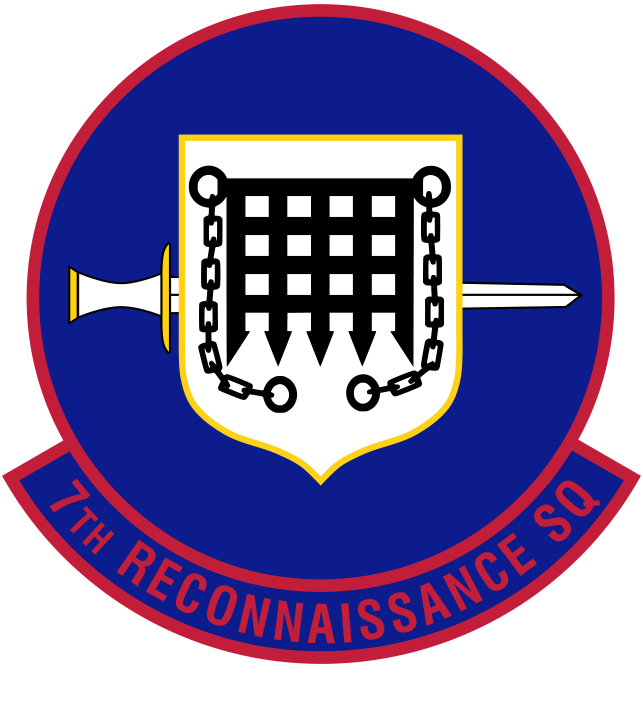
- 7th Observation Squadron emblem

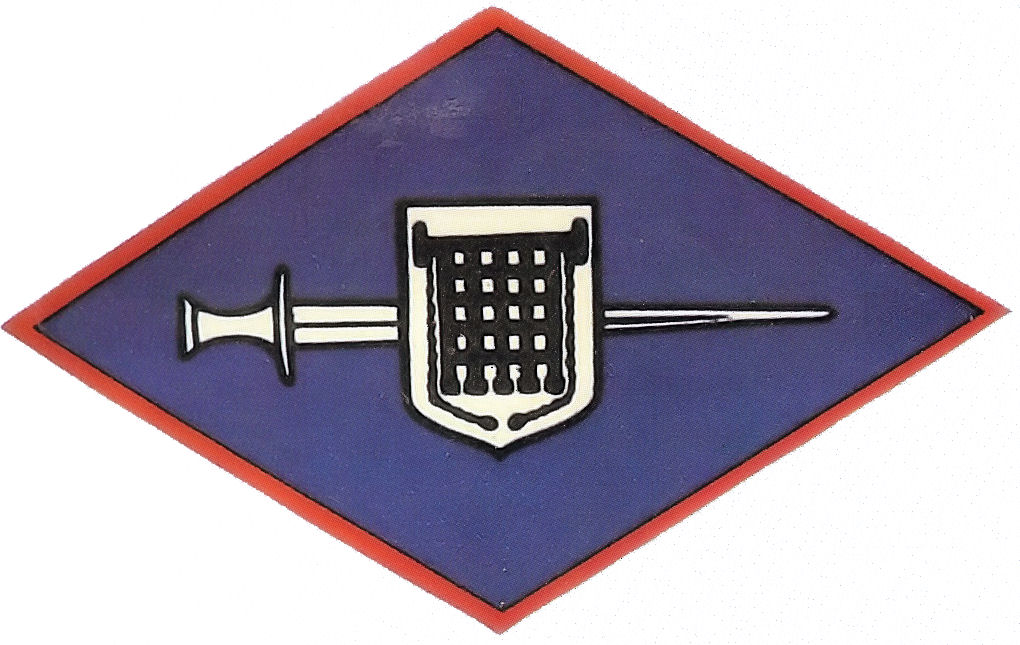
- 397th Bombardment Squadron emblem (Note: Approved 5 May 1924. Description: On a blue diamond piped with red with its long axis horizontal a white sword pointing to the dexter [sic] behind a white shield portraying a black portcullis.)

The 7th Reconnaissance Squadron is a squadron of the United States Air Force. It is assigned to the 319th Operations Group and is stationed at Naval Air Station Sigonella, Sicily, Italy.

The squadron was first established in the Panama Canal Zone as the 7th Aero Squadron in 1917 and served as a reconnaissance unit until 1942, when it was redesignated as the 397th Bombardment Squadron. It served as a bomber unit through World War II and was inactivated at Río Hato Field, Panama on 1 November 1946. The squadron was reactivated in 2015, returning to its earlier reconnaissance mission.

== Mission ==
The squadron's primary mission is launching, recovering and providing sorties with the Northrop Grumman RQ-4 Global Hawk in support of European Command, United States Africa Command and United States Central Command missions to provide near real time awareness to combat forces. It also cooperates with NATO and other allied forces.

== History ==
=== World War I ===
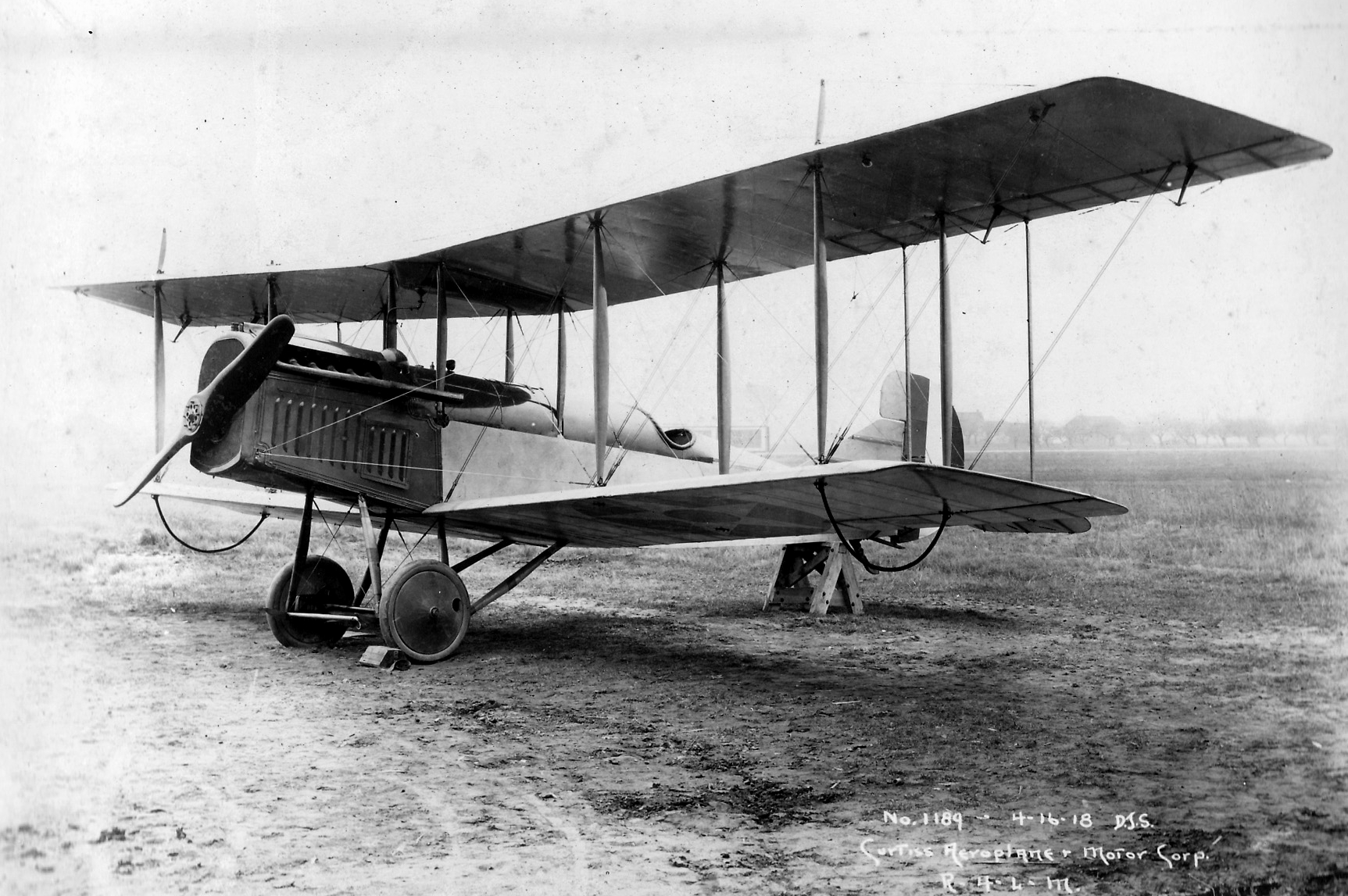
Curtiss R-4L

With the entry of the United States into World War I, the War Department believed it was necessary to establish an air presence along the Atlantic terminus of the Panama Canal as a defensive measure against an enemy seaborne attack. The Army ordered Captain Henry H. Arnold to proceed to the Canal Zone to form the 7th Aero Squadron, which was organized on 29 March 1917 at Ancón, Panama Canal Zone. Provisions for the squadron's arrival had not been made and the squadron moved several times to locations on the Pacific side of the Canal Zone before locating at Fort Sherman, on the Atlantic side, in late August 1917. The squadron received its first aircraft in December 1917, when two Curtiss R-4s arrived. By February 1918, the squadron had also received Curtiss R-6s and Curtiss R-3s.

In May 1918, the squadron moved to Coco Walk (later France Field), Panama Canal Zone, which would be its base until shortly before the United States entered World War II. Between June and November 1918, the squadron flew overwater patrols near the eastern approaches to the Panama Canal under the control of the Harbor Defenses of Cristobal. With the end of World War I most of the 7th Aero Squadron's personnel moved back to the United States for discharge, although a handful of regulars remained.

=== Interwar period ===
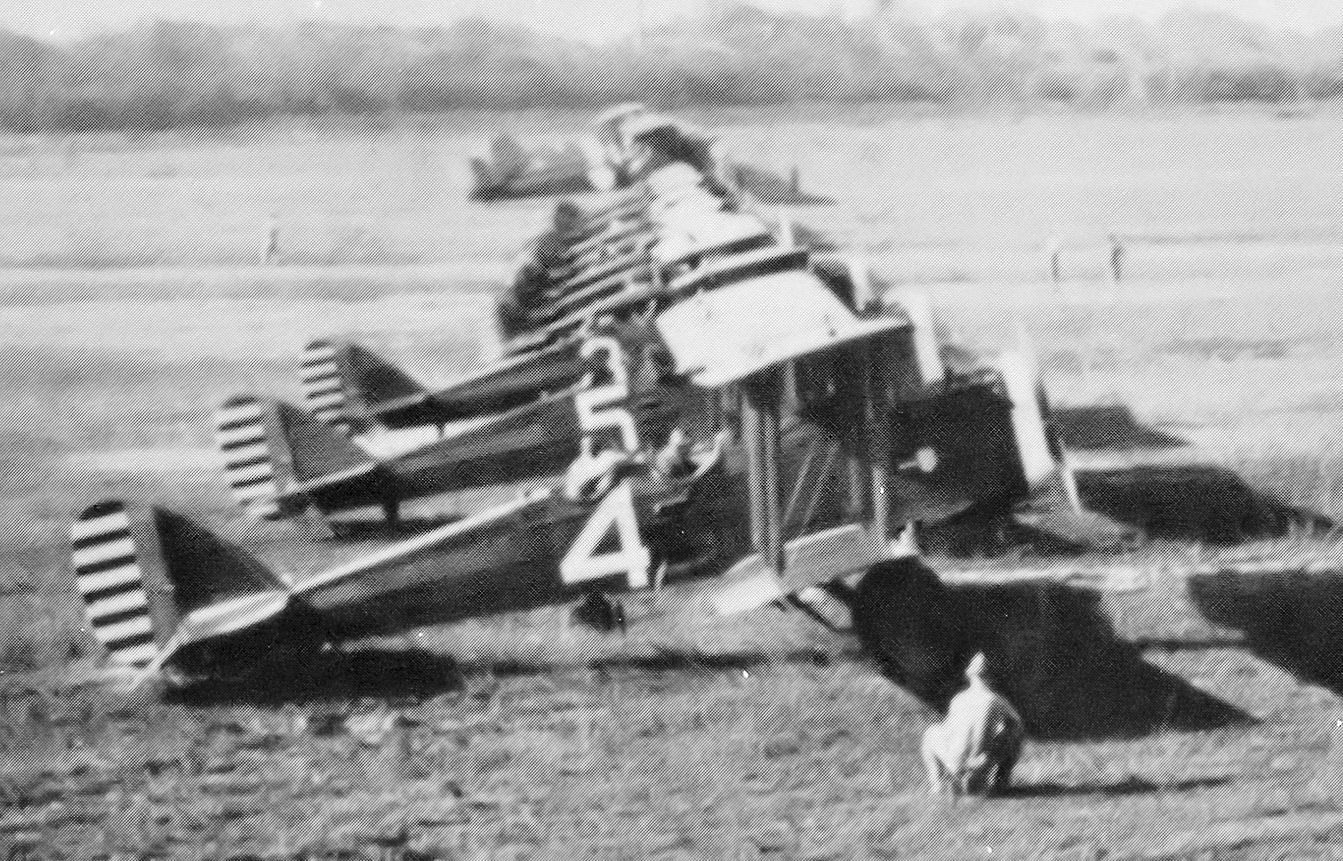
de Havilland DH-4s at Rio Hato Airfield, Panama, 1920s

Although it initially remained the only operational squadron in Panama until 1922, the squadron was assigned to the newly-formed 3d Observation Group in September 1919, although the 3rd Group remained a paper unit until 1922, when the 24th Pursuit Squadron and the 25th Bombardment Squadron arrived in Panama to join the 7th. In 1919, it replaced its Curtiss observation planes with Dayton-Wright DH-4s, which would remain its primary aircraft until 1931. It also operated a number of other types, including Curtiss HS-1L and HS-2L flying boats. The squadron was redesignated the 7th Squadron (Observation) in March 1921 and the 7th Observation Squadron in January 1925.

In 1923, two planes of the squadron participated in a "goodwill" flight to Costa Rica. This was the first of what would become regular flights by Panama based air units. En route, the squadron's planes charted airways for future use in what was the first flight of any kind between Panama and Costa Rica. In 1926, the squadron gained a pair of Loening OA-1 amphibians. These aircraft were soon used in a "goodwill" flight to Colombia, The Netherlands Antilles, and Venezuela. In 1927, the squadron operated one of the three Thomas-Morse O-6s ever built to test its metal structure under tropical conditions. (Note: The O-6 was essentially an O-2 with metal construction. Hagedorn, p. 14.) In 1930, the Thomas-Morse O-19 replaced the DH-4 as the squadron's primary observation plane, while Douglas OA-4 Dolphins replaced the OA-1s.

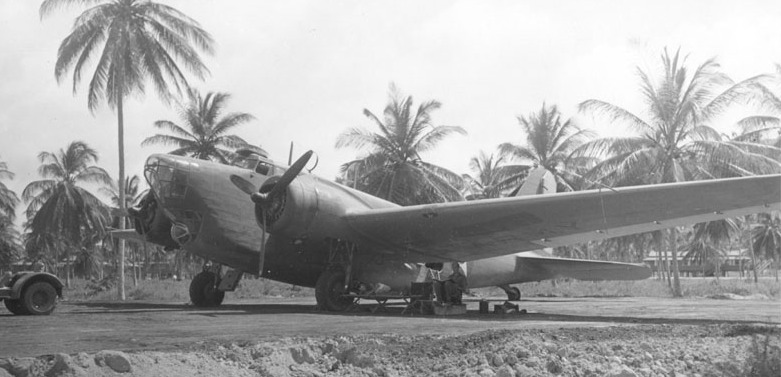
Douglas B-18 Bolo at Aguadulce Field, Panama.

In 1936, the squadron began replacing its aircraft with two engine Martin B-10s. The longer range of this aircraft was recognized by the squadron becoming the 7th Reconnaissance Squadron on 1 September 1937, as its parent became the 6th Bombardment Group. The squadron flew additional "goodwill" missions to Colombia, El Salvador, Nicaragua and Guatemala during the second half of the 1930s. It flew disaster relief missions to Chile following a devastating earthquake during January and February 1939.

A long range reconnaissance squadron, like the 7th, was attached to each Air Corps bombardment group, although this reorganization was delayed unti 1940, when the squadron's assignment to the 6th Group was changed to attachment, as the unit was reassigned to the 19th Composite Wing and placed under operational control of the Caribbean Air Force. The squadron's use of the B-10 was short-lived, and in 1938, it began transitioning into the Douglas B-18 Bolo, with the last B-10 being reassigned in 1939.

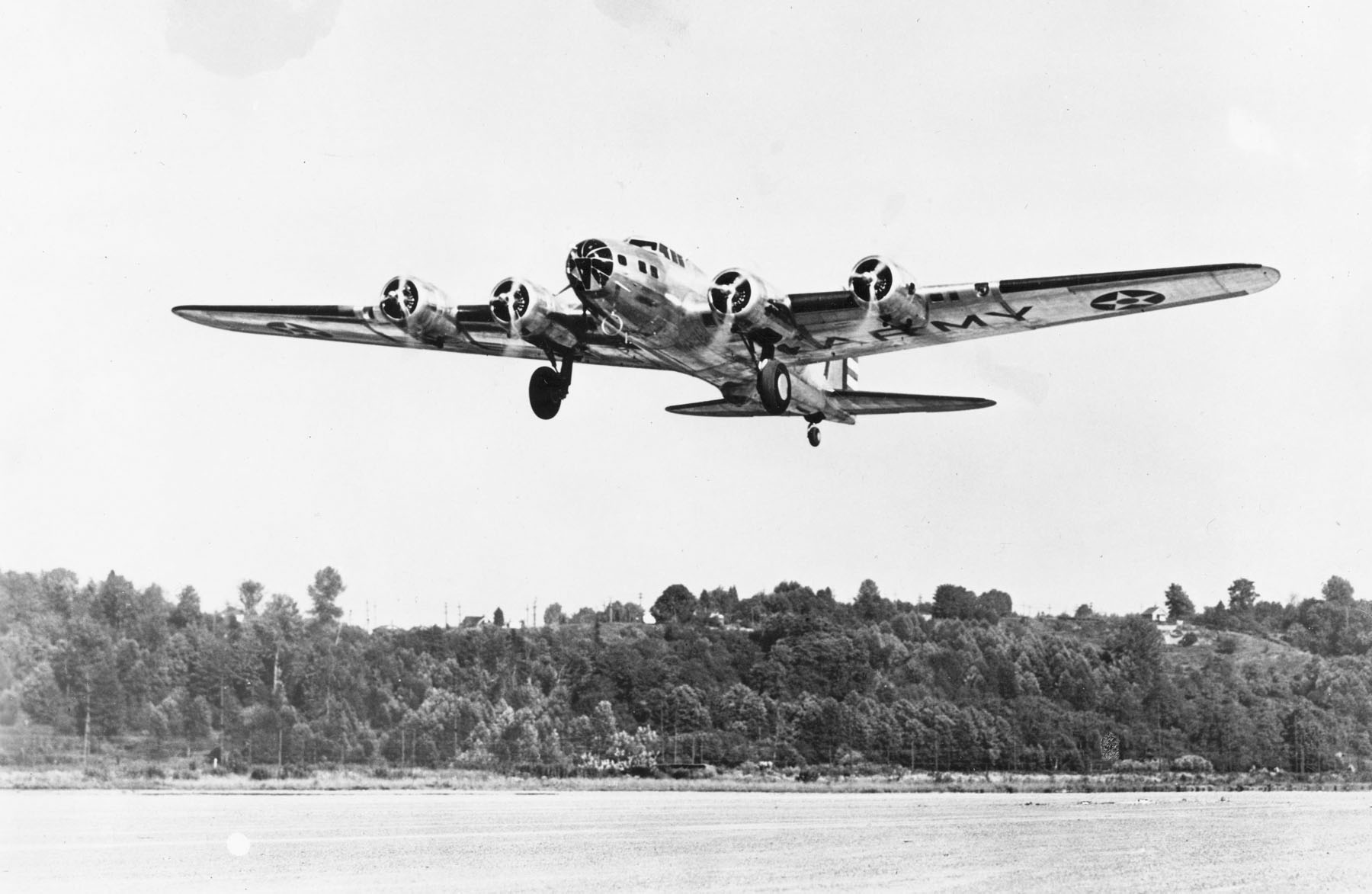
B-17B Flying Fortress taking off

On 4 June 1941, it received a Boeing B-17B Flying Fortress, the first production version of the Flying Fortress assigned to Caribbean Air Force. On 8 October 1941, it was once again assigned to the 6th Bombardment Group and, on 27 November, the unit moved from France Field to Howard Field on the Pacific side of the Panama Canal, where it became fully equipped with B-17Bs.

=== World War II ===
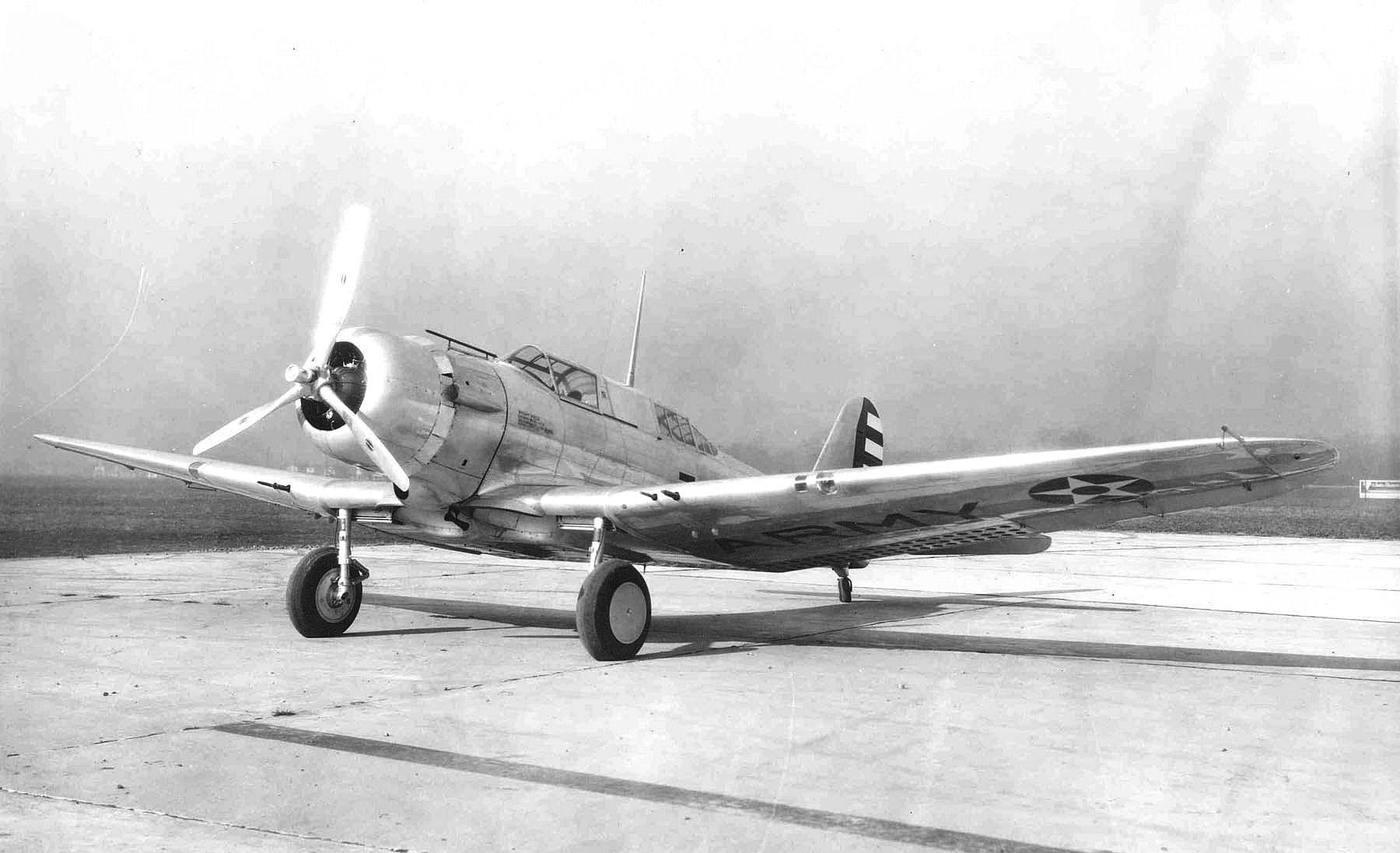
Northrop A-17A

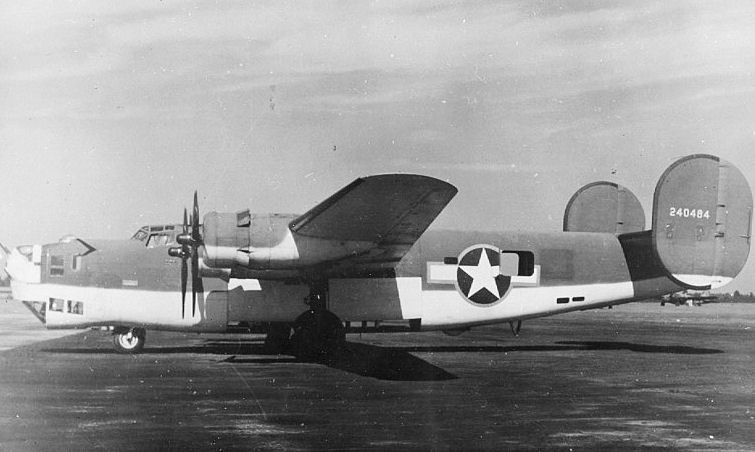
B-24 equipped for antisubmarine warfare

After the Japanese Attack on Pearl Harbor the Squadr almost immediately moved to David Field, Panama. However, the Squadron's B-17s deployed elsewhere (mainly to Guatemala City Airport, Guatemala to reinforce the 74th Bombardment Squadron) to begin the Pacific patrols in early January 1942. In their place, the squadron returned to flying B-18 Bolos, operating from both David Field and Río Hato Field. In April 1942, the squadron, along with other reconnaissance squadrons operating the same medium and heavy bombers as the group they were attached to, were redesignated as bombardment squadrons. The squadron became the 397th Bombardment Squadron, but most of its aircrews were transferred to Australia.

Although still stationed at David Field, the squadron deployed from June to August 1942 to reinforce the operations of the 44th and 74th Bombardment Squadrons at Guatemala City. At the end of this deployment, the squadron moved to Talara Airfield, Peru, operating from Talara and from Salinas Airfield, Ecuador. The squadron conducted long range patrols over the Pacific with Consolidated LB-30 Liberators, impressed from an order by the Royal Air Force, flying to the Galapagos Islands and, occasionally continuing patrols to Guatemala City. These flights continued through May 1943, when the unit returned to Rio Hato. Upon its return to Rio Hato, the 397th was transformed, as an entirely new cadre replaced the veterans of the Galapagos. (Note: These replacements were drawn from the 39th Bombardment Group at Davis-Monthan Field, Arizona. Conaway.)

In April 1943, the War Department reduced the Caribbean defenses to "a coastal command that may be subject to minor attacks." In the resulting reduction of forces in Panama, the 6th Bombardment Group was disbanded on 1 November 1943, and the squadron was assigned directly to VI Bomber Command. However, the U-boat threat was not over, for on 1 January 1944, the squadron deployed four LB-30s to France Field to search for reported marauding German U-boats, although none were sighted. The squadron also replaced its LB-30s with newer B-24J Liberators. (Note: The squadron had also been operating B-24Ds along with its LB-30s.)

The unit moved to Seymour Island Airfield in the Galapagos Islands, starting on 7 April 1944. The 397th flew patrols and convoy protection missions. In February 1945, the unit returned to Rio Hato, where it ended the war. As the postwar Army Air Forces continued to shrink, by September 1945 40 percent of the squadron had departed. On 1 November 1946 VI Bomber Command and its three remaining bombardment squadrons, including the 397th, were inactivated.

=== Unmanned vehicle operations ===
The unit was redesignated 7th Reconnaissance Squadron and activated at Naval Air Station Sigonella, Sicily, Italy on 15 May 2015. The squadron assumed the resources of Detachment 1, 69th Reconnaissance Group at Sigonella. Initially assigned to the 69th Group, it was transferred to the 319th Operations Group at Grand Forks Air Force Base, North Dakota in June 2019.

== Lineage ==
- Organized as the 7th Aero Squadron on 29 March 1917

Redesignated 7th Squadron (Observation) on 14 March 1921
Redesignated 7th Observation Squadron on 25 January 1925
Redesignated 7th Reconnaissance Squadron on 1 September 1937
Redesignated 7th Reconnaissance Squadron (Medium Range) on 6 December 1939
Redesignated 7th Reconnaissance Squadron (Heavy) on 20 November 1940
Redesignated 397th Bombardment Squadron (Heavy) on 11 May 1942
Redesignated 397th Bombardment Squadron, Heavy c. 1944
Inactivated on 1 November 1946
Redesignated 7th Reconnaissance Squadron on 1 May 2015
Activated on 15 May 2015

=== Assignments ===
- United States Troops, Panama Canal Zone, 29 March 1917
- Panama Canal Department, 1 July 1917
- 3d Observation Group (later 6th Observation Group, 6th Composite Group, 6th Bombardment Group), 30 September 1919
- 19th Composite Wing, 1 February 1940 (attached to 6th Bombardment Group)
- 6th Bombardment Group, 25 February 1942
- VI Bomber Command, 1 November 1943 – 1 November 1946
- 69th Reconnaissance Group, 15 May 2015
- 319th Operations Group, 28 June 2019 – present

=== Stations ===
- Ancon, Panama Canal Zone, 29 March 1917
- Corozal, Panama Canal Zone, 16 April 1917
- Empire, Panama Canal Zone, May 1917
- Fort Sherman, Panama Canal Zone, c. 29 August 1917
- Cristobal, Panama Canal Zone, March 1918
- Coco Walk (later France Field), Panama Canal Zone, May 1918
- Howard Field, Panama Canal Zone, 26 November 1941
- David Field, Panama, 11 December 1941
- Talara Airfield, Peru, 18 August 1942
- Rio Hato Field, Panama, c. 4 May 1943
- Seymour Island Airfield, Baltra, Galapagos Islands, c. 7 April 1944
- Rio Hato Army Air Base, Panama, c. 6 February 1945 – 1 November 1946
- Naval Air Station Sigonella, 15 May 2015 – present

=== Aircraft ===
- Curtiss R-4, 1917–1919
- Curtiss R-3, 1917–1919
- Curtiss R-6, 1918–1919
- Curtiss R-9, 1918–1919
- Curtiss JN-4 Jenny, 1918–1919, 1919–1920
- Curtiss JN-6, 1919–1920
- Dayton-Wright DH-4B, 1919–1927
- Dayton-Wright DH-4M, 1926–1930
- Curtiss HS-2L, 1919–1922
- Loening 0A-1, 1926–1930
- Douglas O-2, 1919–1931
- Thomas Morse 0–6, 1927
- Thomas Morse 0–19, 1930–1937
- Douglas OA-4 Dolphin, 1930–1936
- Sikorsky OA-8
- Martin B-10, 1936–1939
- Douglas B-18 Bolo, 1938–1942
- Boeing B-17 Flying Fortress, 1941–1942
- Consolidated LB-30 Liberator, 1942–1944
- Northrop A-17A Nomad, 1941, 1943
- Consolidated B-24 Liberator, 1943–1946
- Northrop Grumman RQ-4 Global Hawk, 2015–present

=== Campaigns ===
Campaign Streamer	Campaign	Dates	Notes
	Antisubmarine	7 December 1941–1 August 1943	7th Reconnaissance Squadron (later 397th Bombardment Squadron)

== See also ==
- List of United States Air Force reconnaissance squadrons
- List of American aero squadrons
- B-17 Flying Fortress units of the United States Army Air Forces
- B-24 Liberator units of the United States Army Air Forces
