= 6th Operations Group =

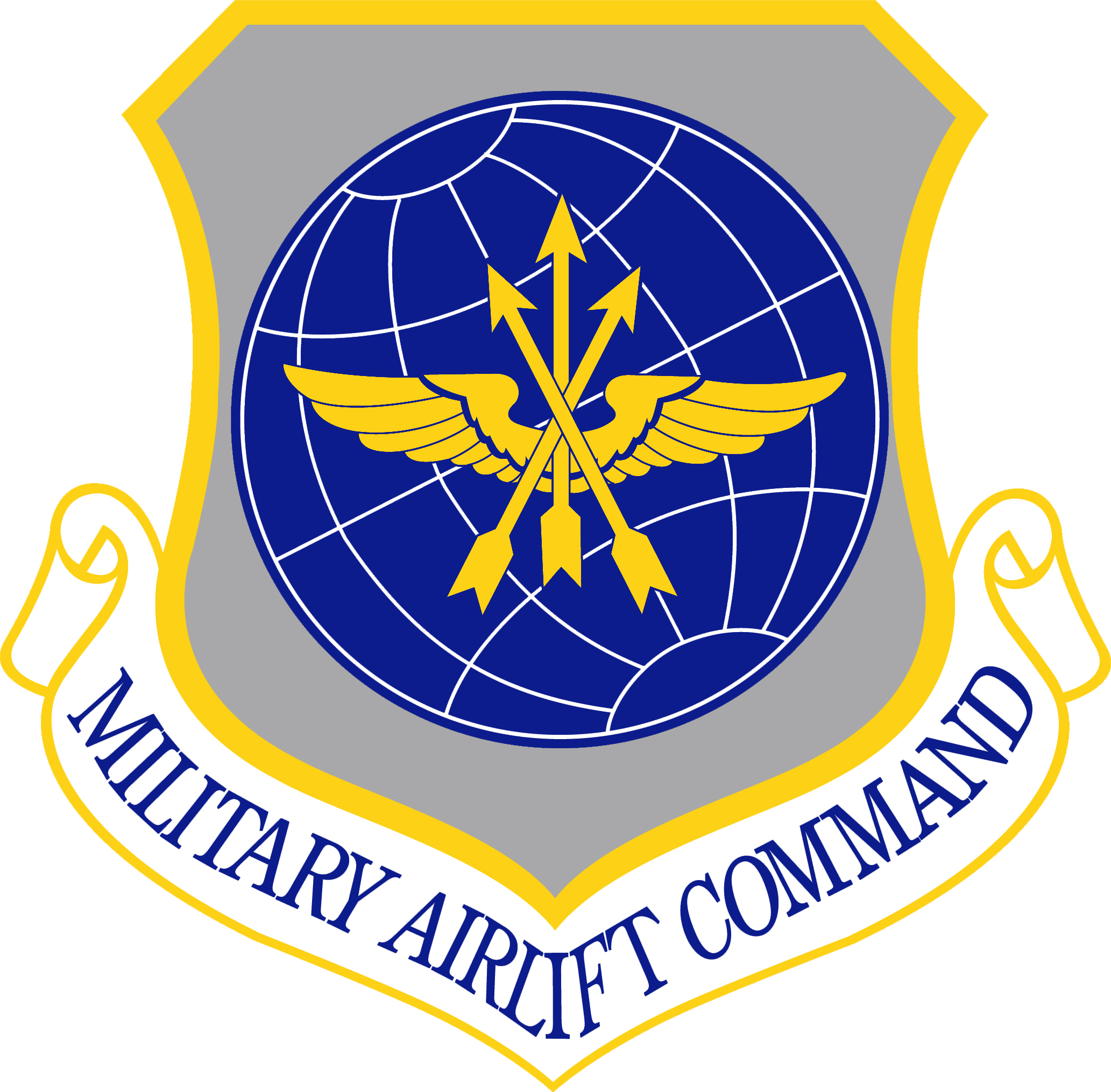
6th Operations Group

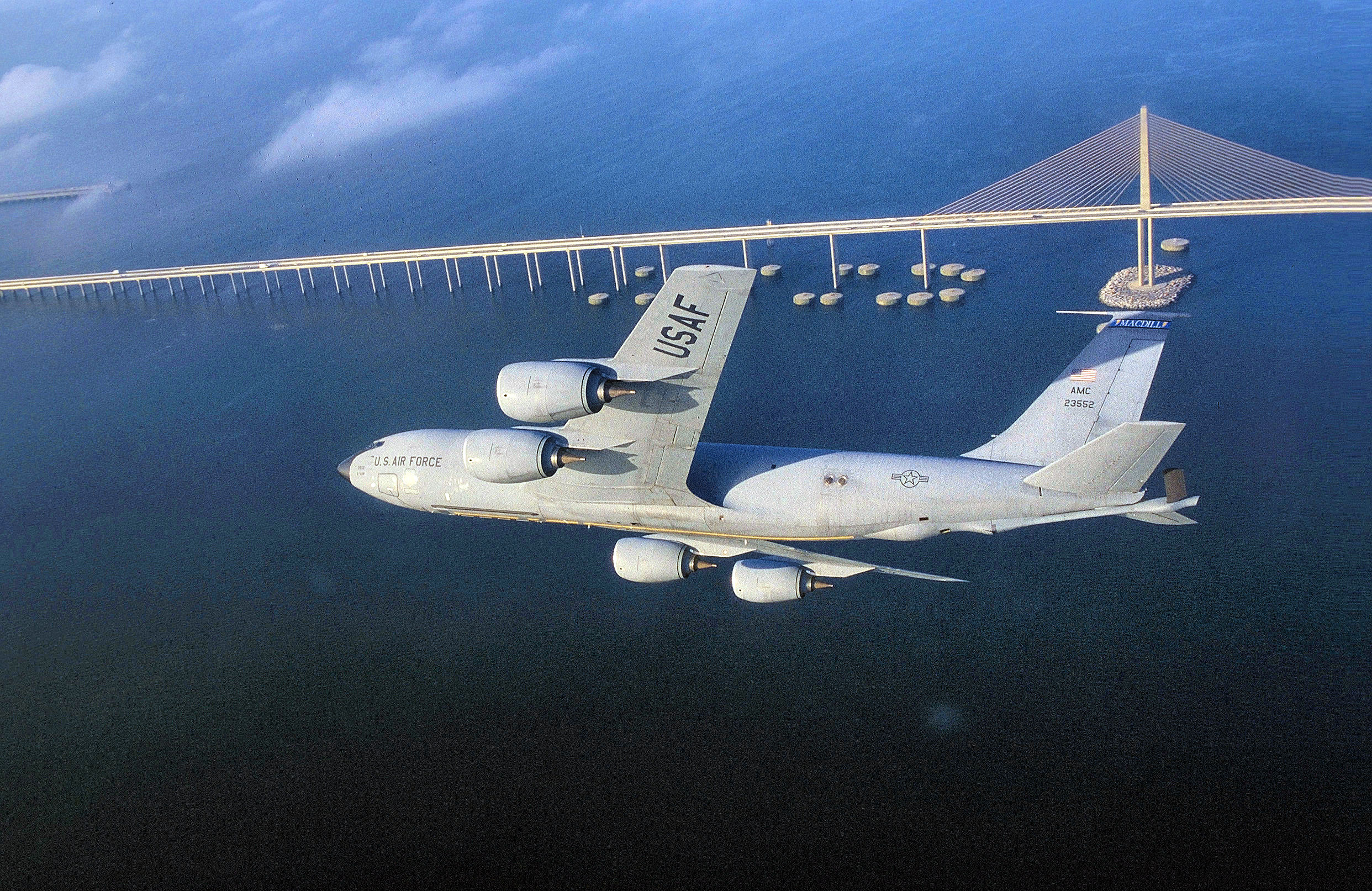
- Boeing KC-135R-BN Stratotanker 62-3552 assigned to the 6th Air Refueling Wing, 91st Air Refueling Squadron, at MacDill Air Force Base, Fla., flies a training mission over the Sunshine Skyway Bridge over Tampa Bay, Florida.
- Active: 1919–1944; 1944–1948; 1951–1952; 1996–present
- Country: United States
- Branch: United States Air Force
- Part of: Air Mobility Command
- Motto(s): Parati Defendere Latin Ready to Defend
- Engagements: World War II
- Decorations: Distinguished Unit Citation; Air Force Outstanding Unit Award

Insignia
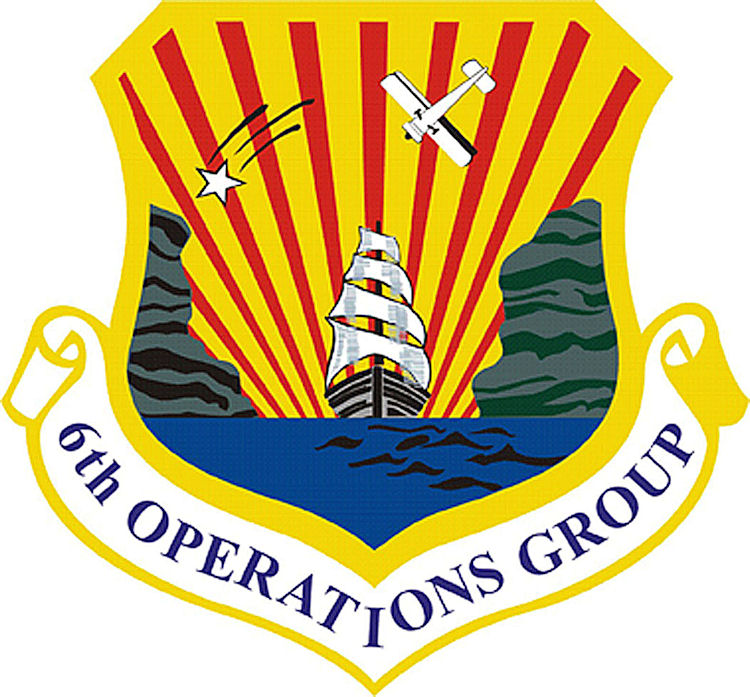
- 6th Operations Group emblem (Note: The group uses the 6th Wing emblem with the group designation on the scroll. The emblem, a variation of the coat of arms approved for the group in 1924 (less the crest), reflects its Panama Canal Zone origins with a ship sailing through the Gaillard Cut and an airplane flying overhead.)

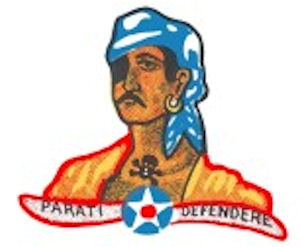
- 6th Composite Group Distinctive Unit Insigne (Note: This is the crest of the group's coat of arms.)

The 6th Operations Group (6 OG) is the operational flying component of the 6th Air Refueling Wing, stationed at MacDill Air Force Base, Florida.

The mission of the 6th OG is the planning and executing global aerial refueling, combatant commander airlift, and specialized missions for US and allied combat and support aircraft. The group extends US global power and global reach by employing of a mix of KC-135R and C-37 aircraft.

The 6th Operations Group is a successor organization of the 6th Group (Composite), one of the 15 original combat air groups formed by the Army before World War II. During World War II, the 6th Bombardment Group, Very Heavy was a B-29 Superfortress group assigned to Twentieth Air Force flying bombardment operations against Japan. Its aircraft were identified by a "R" inside a Circle painted on the tail.

== History ==
For additional history and lineage, see 6th Air Mobility Wing

=== Origins ===
The 6th Operations Group's origins began on 30 September 1919 as the United States Army Panama Canal Department 3d Observation Group, stationed at France Field in the Panama Canal Zone. The unit controlled numerous miscellaneous Air Service light observation squadrons to protect the Panama Canal area.

In 1921, the group was redesignated the 6th Group (Observation), and in 1922, the 6th Group (Composite). The 6th flew such aircraft at the Curtiss R-4, DeHavilland 4-B, SE-5A, MG-3A, Piper L-4, P-12B Martin B-10 and Douglas B-18 Bolo aircraft.

Throughout the 1920s and 1930, the group participated in manoeuvres, flying patrol missions, photographing the canal area, staging aerial reviews and making good-will flights to Central and South America. In 1933, the group became part of the larger 19th Composite Wing, which provided a central command and control organization for the Air Service units. In 1937, as the mission of the 6th moved toward bombardment, the War Department renamed it the 6th Bombardment Group. They continued to operate in the Canal Zone under the VI Bomber Command of the Sixth Air Force at Rio Hato AB, Albrook Field and Howard Field.

=== World War II ===
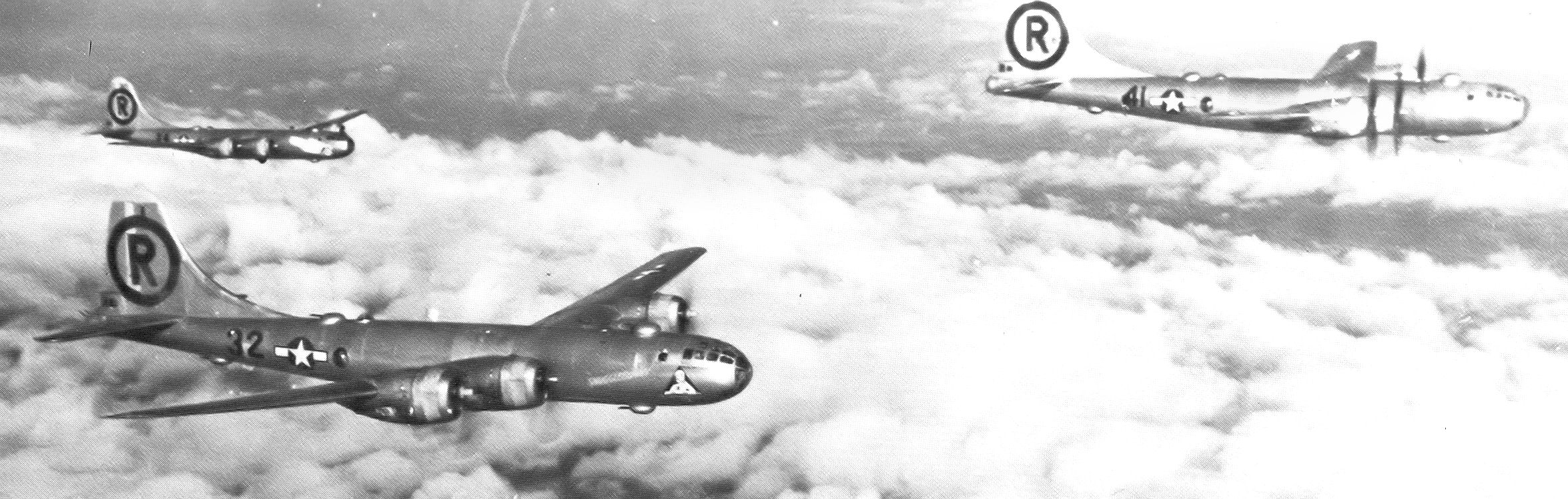
6th Bombardment Group, 39th Squadron B-29's in Formation in 1945.From back to front, No. 34 - Patricia Lynn, Commanded by Lt. John Burwell, No. 41 - Forever Amber, Commanded by 1/Lt. William G. Catts, and up front is No. 32 - Snugglebunny, Commanded by 1/Lt. John E. Jennings. Both the Snugglebunny and Patricia Lynn would survive the war. Snugglebunny went on to fly combat missions with the 98th Bomb Group in the Korean War. Forever Amber would be lost during Mission #45 on June 5th, 1945. The target was Kobe, Japan, during a daylight raid. Forever Amber was able to limp back to base, where the aircraft was deemed no longer fit for service. During the raid, Forever Amber suffered two KIA and several WIA. KIA - S/Sgt. Charles P. Magnuson KIA - S/Sgt. Raymond L. Merritt

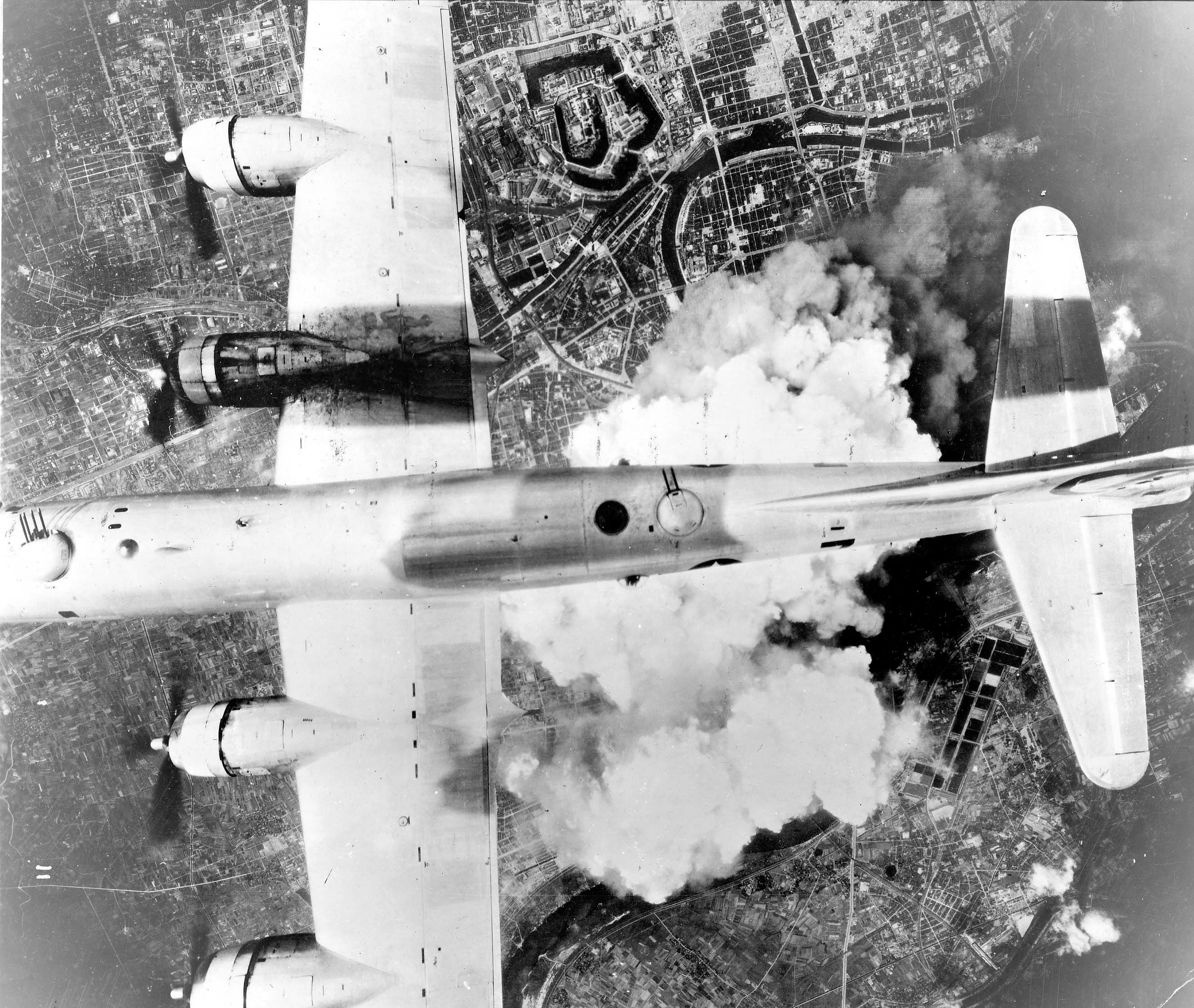
Boeing B-29A-45-BN Superfortress 44-61784 6 BG 24 BS – Incendiary Journey 1 June 1945 mission to Osaka, Japan. (U.S. Air Force photo)

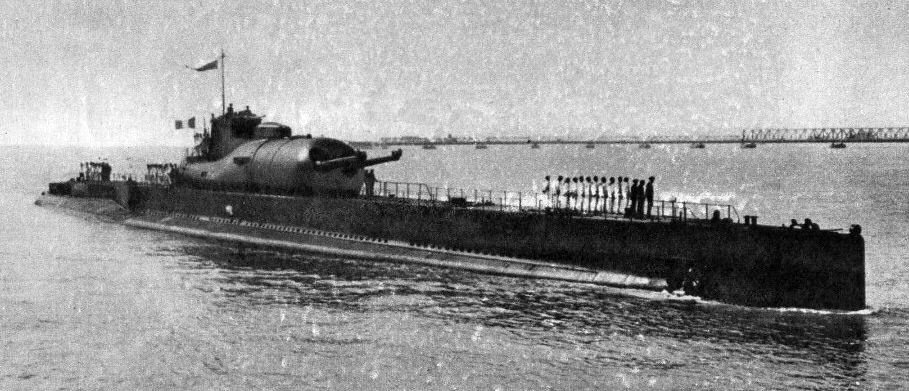
Free French Surcouf

As events in Europe and the Far East unfolded, the 6th Bomb Group and its units moved towards a war footing. Starting in May 1940, ground training for junior officers, newly arrived at France Field, became of major importance. Local courses on armament, use of flares and the delicate and seldom practiced fusing of bombs were made practically daily matters of practical application. Communications were also being stressed, as qualified radio operators were in short supply, while the squadrons rotated in and out of Rio Hato Army Air Base on "live" bombing practice.

On 4 June 1941, the first four-engine Boeing B-17B Flying Fortress was assigned to the Group. By November, all four of the B-17Bs had been assigned to the 7th Reconnaissance Squadron.

Many alerts and false alarms of enemy aircraft were recorded in the first three months after the Japanese Pearl Harbor Attack, although, of course, these proved to be false alarms. As the early months of the war swept by, and as VI Bomber Command struggled to apportion its scarce resources to best advantage.

In 1941 it was assigned to the new VI Bomber Command of Sixth Air Force with an antisubmarine mission on both the Caribbean and Pacific approaches to the Panama Canal. By 1943, the antisubmarine mission was taken over by the United States Navy, and the group was disbanded in November 1943.

Author James Rusbridger examined the records of the 6th Heavy Bomber Group operations while in Panama. The records show the sinking of a large submarine the morning of 19 February 1942. Since no German submarine was lost in the area on that date, it is assumed the large submarine was the Free-French Surcouf, which was the largest submarine in the world at the time. Rusbridger suggested that a collision reported by the American freighter Thompson Lykes on the night of 18 February, sustained damaged to the submarine's radio antenna with the stricken vessel limping towards Panama.

On 19 April 1944, the 6th Bombardment Group was reactivated at Dalhart Army Air Field, Texas, being formed as a B-29 Superfortress Very Heavy bombardment Group. The reactivated group was initially assigned four newly constituted bomb squadrons, the 24th, 39th, 40th and 41st as its operational components.

Due to a shortage of B-29s, the group was equipped with former II Bomber Command B-17 Flying Fortresses previously used for training heavy bomber replacement personnel. In May shortages in aircraft and equipment led to the 41st Bomb Squadron being inactivated, with its personnel being consolidated into other group squadrons and the 6th becoming a three squadron group (the 41st would be reactivated a month later as part of the 501st Bombardment Group, but was inactivated a second time, finally being deployed into combat with the 448th Bombardment Group). The 6th was eventually equipped with newly manufactured B-29 Superfortresses at Grand Island Army Airfield, Nebraska, during the summer of 1944.

In November the group was deployed to the Asiatic-Pacific Theater, being assigned to the XXI Bomber Command 313th Bombardment Wing, being stationed at North Field, Tinian, The group entered combat by flying navigational escort for a major attack force bound for Iwo Jima. The 6th then began engaging in very long range bombardment missions over the Japanese Home Islands, striking Tokyo and other major Japanese cities and facilities during daylight high-altitude bombing raids, with crippling, non-stop incendiary raids which destroyed lines of communication, supply, and numerous kamikaze bases.

On 25 May 1945, the 6th flew a low-altitude night mission through alerted enemy defenses to drop incendiary bombs on Tokyo, for which they received their first Distinguished Unit Citation. In addition to incendiary raids, the 6th also participated in mining operations. By mining harbors in Japan and Korea in July 1945, the group contributed to the blockade of the Japanese Empire earning their second Distinguished Unit Citation. The 6th's final World War II mission came on 14 August 1945, with the dropping of 500-pound general-purpose bombs on the Marifu railroad yards at Iwakuni.

=== Postwar era ===
With the war over, the 6th dropped food and supplies to Allied prisoners of war and took part in show-of-force flights over Japan. The unit remained on Tinian until February 1946 during which time the group largely demobilized as part of the "Sunset Project", with some aircraft being sent as reclamation on Tinian; others being returned to the United States for storage at aircraft depots in the southwest. By Christmas, the group fleet was reduced to 30 or fewer planes. Many of the remaining veterans signed for "any conditions of travel" to get home, arriving three weeks later in Oakland, California, where troop trains scattered them for points of discharge close to their homes.

The unit moved to Clark Field in the Philippines where it was reassigned to the postwar Far East Air Forces 1st Air Division. At Clark its remaining aircraft and personnel were consolidated into other units. It was again reassigned in June 1947 to Kadena Air Base, Okinawa as a paper unit where it was inactivated in 1948.

In January 1951, the group was activated as the operational component of the new 6th Bombardment Wing at Walker AFB, New Mexico, as part of Strategic Air Command's Fifteenth Air Force. However all of the group's B-29 Superfortress were attached directly to the Wing organization, with the group having only one officer and one airman officially assigned to group headquarters. It was inactivated in June 1952 as part of the implementation of the postwar Tri-Deputate organization, as all operational flying squadrons were assigned directly to the 6th Bombardment Wing.

=== Reactivation, from the 1990s ===
Activated on 1 October 1996 with an air refueling mission as part of the Objective Wing structure of the 6th Air Refueling Wing.

Elements deployed to Southwest Asia in July 1998 to refuel aircraft engaged in no-fly operations over northern Iraq. After January 2001, the group also provided airlift for the commanders of U.S. Central Command and U.S. Special Operations Command. It also refueled fighters providing security over the southeastern United States as part of homeland security after terrorist attacks against the United States in September 2001. MacDill KC-135’s have supported US military operations all over the world including refueling coalition aircraft during the war in Bosnia. Since 2001, personnel and aircraft deployed around the world to fulfill air refueling and aeromedical missions.

The 6th has twice won the Air Mobility Rodeo Best Air Mobility Wing Award; in 2000 and 2005.

The group's squadrons in the late 2010s include:

- 6th Operations Support

Provides airfield operations management, air traffic control, weather services, intelligence support, combat tactics development and training, mission development, and manage aircrew training support operations. Manage flight records and KC-135R simulator training.

- 50th Air Refueling Squadron

- 91st Air Refueling Squadron

- 99th Air Refueling Squadron, active duty associate unit with the 117th Air Refueling Wing at Birmingham IAP, Alabama.

All three Air Refuelling Squadrons operate the KC-135R Stratotanker, a long-range tanker aircraft capable of refueling a variety of other aircraft in mid-air, anywhere in the world and under any weather condition.

== Lineage ==
6th Bombardment Group

- Established as the 3d Observation Group, and organized on 30 September 1919

Redesignated 6th Group (Observation) on 14 March 1921
Redesignated 6th Group (Composite) in June 1922
Redesignated 6th Composite Group on 25 January 1923
Redesignated 6th Bombardment Group on 1 September 1937
Redesignated 6th Bombardment Group (Medium) on 6 December 1939
Redesignated 6th Bombardment Group (Heavy) on 12 December 1940
Disestablished on 1 November 1943.
Reestablished, and consolidated with the 6th Bombardment Group, Very Heavy on 29 June 1944

6th Operations Group
Established as the 6th Bombardment Group, Very Heavy on 28 March 1944
Activated on 1 April 1944
Consolidated with the 6th Bombardment Group (Heavy) on 29 June 1944
Inactivated on 18 October 1948

- Redesignated 6th Bombardment Group, Medium on 20 December 1950

Activated on 2 January 1951
Inactivated on 16 June 1952

- Redesignated 6th Strategic Group on 31 July 1985 (Remained inactive)
- Redesignated 6th Operations Group on 1 July 1996

Activated on 1 October 1996

== Assignments ==
- Panama Canal Department, 30 September 1919
- 19th Composite Wing (later, 19 Wing; 19 Bombardment Wing), 25 January 1933
- VI Bomber Command, 25 October 1941 – 1 November 1943
- Second Air Force, 1 April 1944
- 313th Bombardment Wing, 23 April 1944

Attached to 17th Bombardment Operational Training Wing (Very Heavy), c. 19 May–18 November 1944

- 1st Air Division, 1 June 1947 – 18 October 1948
- 6th Bombardment Wing, 2 January 1951 – 16 June 1952
- 6th Air Refueling (later, 6th Air Mobility) Wing, since 1 October 1996

== Components ==
=== Panama ===
- 3d Bombardment Squadron: 1 February 1940 – 1 November 1943
- 5th Reconnaissance Squadron: 24 October 1919 – 24 March 1920 (detached entire period)
- 7th Aero (later, 7th Observation; 7th Reconnaissance; 397th Bombardment): assigned 30 September 1919 – 1 February 1940, attached 1 February 1940 – 25 February 1942, assigned 25 February 1942 – 1 November 1943
- 24th Aero (later, 24th Pursuit): assigned 27 May 1922 – 8 May 1929, attached 8 May 1929 – 1 December 1932
- 25th Bombardment Squadron: 27 May 1922 – 12 May 1943
- 29th Bombardment Squadron: 12 May–1 November 1943
- 41st Bombardment Squadron: 1 April–10 May 1944
- 44th Observation Squadron: 1 April 1931 – 1 September 1937
- 74th Bombardment Squadron: 1 February 1940 – 9 August 1942; 12 May–1 November 1943
- 78th Pursuit Squadron: attached 1 April 1931 – 1 December 1932
- 395th Bombardment Squadron: 9 August 1942 – 12 May 1943

=== Twentieth Air Force ===
- 24th Bombardment Squadron: 1 April 1944 – 18 October 1948; 2 January 1951 – 16 June 1952 (detached 2 January 1951 – 16 June 1952)
- 39th Bombardment Squadron: 1 April 1944 – 18 October 1948; 2 January 1951 – 16 June 1952 (detached 2 January 1951 – 16 June 1952)
- 40th Bombardment Squadron: 1 April 1944 – 18 October 1948; 2 January 1951 – 16 June 1952 (detached 2 January 1951 – 16 June 1952)
- 22d Photographic Laboratory Squadron

=== United States Air Force ===
- 6th Air Refueling Squadron: 10 April – 1 August 1951 (detached entire period)
- 50th Air Refueling Squadron, c. 2 October 2017 – present
- 91st Air Refueling Squadron: 1 October 1996 – present
- 99th Air Refueling Squadron : 1 October 2009 – present
- 310th Airlift Squadron: 1 January 2001 – 30 September 2019
- 911th Air Refueling Squadron: 12 April 2008 – present

== Stations ==
- France Field, Canal Zone, 30 September 1919
- Río Hato AB, Panama, 9 December 1941
- Albrook Field, Canal Zone, 14 January 1943
- Howard Field, Canal Zone, October–1 November 1943
- Dalhart Army Air Field, Texas, 1 April 1944
- Grand Island Army Airfield, Nebraska, 19 May–18 November 1944
- North Field, Tinian, 28 December 1944
- Clark Field, Philippines, c. February 1946
- Kadena AB, Okinawa, 1 June 1947 – 18 October 1948
- Walker AFB, New Mexico, 2 January 1951 – 16 June 1952
- MacDill AFB, Florida, since 1 October 1996

== Aircraft ==
- During 1917–1919 period, included JN-4, R-3 (R-9), and R-4
- During 1919–1931 period, included JN-4, DH-4, HS2L, OA-1, O-2, NBS-1, P-12, SE-5, MB-3, and PW-9.
- During 1928–1932 period, included LB-5, LB-6, and LB-7
- During 1930–1936 period, included OA-4. O-19 1930–1937
- Keystone B-3 1931–1936
- Keystone B-6 1936–1937
- Martin B-10, 1936–1939
- B-18 Bolo, 1938–1943
- LB-30 Liberator, 1942–1943
- B-24 Liberator, 1942–1943
- Northrop A-17A, 1942–1943
- L-4 Grasshopper, 1943
- B/RB-17 Flying Fortress, 1941–1943; 1943–1944
- B-29 Superfortress, 1944–1947
- KC-135 Stratotanker, since 1996
- Boeing EC-135, 1997–2003
- Boeing T-43 Bobcat, 1997–2001
- C-37 Gulfstream V, 2001-2019
