= Camp Harahan =

US Army camp

Camp Harahan Eponym: James T. Harahan
- Jefferson Parish, near New Orleans, Louisiana

Site information
- Type: Staging area for New Orleans Port of Embarkation and training base.

Location
- Coordinates: 29.9433°N 90.1861°W

Site history
- Built: 1942
- In use: 1942 -- 1946

Garrison information
- Garrison: Acreage:

Camp Harahan, also called Camp Plauche, was a troop staging area outside New Orleans, Louisiana during World War II.

The camp served as a staging area for troops passing through the New Orleans Port of Embarkation. Its mission changed to that of a training base in 1942. Between 200,000 - 300,000 troops, including battalions of railroad troops, port troops and hospital men were organized and trained there.

The Army Administration Officer Candidate School was established 19 October 1942 at Mississippi State College under the supervision of the Army Adjutant General. Within a few months the School was renamed the Transportation Corps Officer Candidate School (OCS) and moved to Camp Harahan. The curriculum included transportation modes, terminal operations, and cargo/personnel movement.

The 765th Transportation Battalion was activated at Camp Harahan on 12 March 1943, as the 765th Railway Shop Battalion. It soon deployed to the European Theater.

The 757th Railway Shop Battalion was activated at Camp Harahan on 8 April 1943. For a period of seventeen weeks the unit took basic training that consisted of marches, drilling, class and the firing range. The battalion toured the Higgins Boat Company where the Higgins boat, an amphibious landing craft referred to as LCVP (landing craft, vehicles, personnel), which was used extensively in the Allied forces' D-Day Invasion of Normandy. They left Camp Harahan and were transferred to Camp Joseph T. Robinson, Arkansas for Technical Training on 29 September 1943.

The 721st Railway Operating Battalion was activated at Camp Harahan on 14 April 1943. The unit comprised men from replacement companies, reception centers, a cadre from another battalion and reservists of the New York Central System, which sponsored the battalion. While at Camp Harahan for six weeks, the men underwent a vigorous physical training program, learning to march, hurdle obstacle courses, roll full field packs, fire a gun and become indoctrinated in Army discipline, rules and regulations. The 721st deployed to the CBI Theater.

The 740th Railway Operating Battalion was activated at Camp Harahan in December 1943.

The camp hosted some of the best African-American musical entertainers active in the U.S. after Priv. John Hammond, who was 34 when he enlisted, was posted there to serve in the Army's Transportation Corps. Soon after arrival, he was charged with organizing activities for otherwise-idle Black soldiers, "to lift their morale". His first big show featured King Kolax, "the new king of trumpet", in April 1944, and he subsequently booked Ella Fitzgerald, Louis Jordan, and Billy Eckstine. In letters to friends, he described Camp Plauche's "jimcrow library", noting that it had "no Negro newspapers, no Crisis with my name on the editorial board." He found, though, that the PX was "mixed", or integrated. He wrote that he had hosted "mixed dance band jam sessions, concerts, and lectures" that had "led to no unpleasantness", adding that these were the "first time at this place for any such activity". He also noted that a segregation order placed on base buses had been torn down by men of both races, so the order had to be painted on the bus ceilings. Soon after the first jazz concerts Hammond hosted at Camp Plauche, integrated sports programs were established for the soldiers, and Hammond observed, "Segregation was demolished by sports and music--the high point in my army career." He also served at Camp Gruber, Camp Rucker, and Fort Benning.

The camp was later used to hold German and Italian prisoners-of-war (POWs).

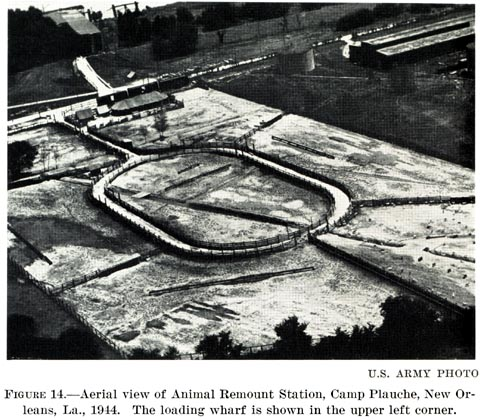
Animal Remount Station
