= An Unmarked Grave =

2012 historical mystery novel by Charles Todd

- Author: Charles Todd
- Series: Bess Crawford Mysteries
- Genre: Historical mystery
- Publisher: William Morrow
- Publication date: 2010
- ISBN: 978-0-06-179179-6
- Preceded by: An Impartial Witness
- Followed by: A Question of Honor

An Unmarked Grave is the fourth in a series of historical mystery novels by American authors Caroline and Charles Todd, writing under the pseudonym Charles Todd, that feature the army nurse Bess Crawford during and after World War I . It was published by William Morrow, an imprint of HarperCollins, in 2012.

== Plot ==
It is Spring 1918, and Bess Crawford, a British army nurse serving on the Western Front, is dealing with an outbreak of Spanish flu among both patients and medical staff. An orderly summons her to the tent where dead soldiers are kept before burial, and shows her a body that has been stripped of uniform and identity discs. It bears no sign of bullet or shrapnel wounds, but the soldier's neck has been broken. Bess recognizes the man, Vincent Carson, a very able major in her father's former regiment. It looks like murder, and the murderer is trying to cover up by placing Vincent's body among actual battle casualties. Before Bess can report this to the head nurse, she is summoned into surgery, and partway through, she falls unconscious, a victim of influenza.

When she awakens, she is back in England being cared for by her parents. Apparently she had come within a whisker of death. The discovery of Vincent Carson's body seems like a fever dream now. But she reconsiders when she hears that the orderly who had shown her Vincent's body had been found hanged. Evidently the body, unidentified because of her illness and the orderly's death, has been buried in an unmarked grave. Someone seems to have committed the perfect murder and then covered it up by killing the orderly.

Her parents were unwilling to let Bess return to the dangers of France, so she accepts a posting to convalescent hospital in Dorset. While there, she takes time on a day off to visit Julie, the widow of Vincent Carson. Julie tells Bess that she learned that Vincent died in battle via a letter from his commanding officer, a Colonel Prescott. Bess is immediately suspicious of the letter, since she knows that Vincent did not die in battle, and his commanding officer was not Colonel Prescott.

The doctor she is working with respects her nursing skills too much to have her stay in England, and soon orders arrive for her to return to France. There, she discovers that the murderer is still keen to cover his tracks, for one night she is attacked from behind, but her screams scare the attacker off. She then receives orders to relocate to a hospital near Dieppe, which she believes are counterfeit, and when she arrives at the rendezvous for her ride to Dieppe, the driver of the car tries to run her over.

Bess begins to question the motive for Vincent's murder. What if the murderer didn't kill Vincent out of spite, but only to steal his major's uniform, which the murderer is now using to hide in plain sight?

Bess uses her father's influence to get the army to issue her orders to do an inspection of field hospitals in France, where she is free to ask questions and slowly tighten the net around the murderer. Flushing him out, she follows him back to England, where she discovers her own family is in mortal danger.

== Publication history ==
Following the success of their first mystery series revolving around Inspector Ian Rutledge, the writing duo of Caroline and Charles Todd decided to start another series, this one about war nurse Bess Crawford, who, before World War I, circulated in the same upper class social circles as Rutledge. The result was A Duty to the Dead, published by William Morrow, an imprint of HarperCollins, in 2009. The fourth book in the series, An Unmarked Grave, was published in 2012. Charles Todd would go on to write eleven more titles in the Bess Crawford series.

== Reception ==
Publishers Weekly noted "Caroline and Charles Todd, the mother-son team who write as Charles Todd, remain unmatched in their ability to convey the horrors of trench warfare and the effect on its participants."

Kirkus Reviews was disappointed, commenting "How many wartime casualties and heroics from Bess does it take to exhaust a reader? Unfortunately, exactly this many, despite the author’s fierce antiwar sentiments. Readers weary of Bess can take refuge in Todd's Ian Rutledge series."

Writing for Library Journal, Susan Moritz commented, "This engaging historical provides an intriguing look at the chaos the 1918 epidemic caused. Bess is the lynchpin of the story, with her sense of justice that won't allow a murderer to go unpunished, even when her life is endangered." Moritz concluded, "Highly recommended for fans of wartime mysteries, plucky women sleuths like Maisie Dobbs, and the Downton Abbey television series."

David Pitt, writing for Booklist, noted, "Todd, a mother-and-son writing team, is improving the Crawford novels with each installment. The series still isn't a serious rival to Todd's Inspector Ian Rutledge mysteries, but it's getting closer." Pitt concluded, "Fans of the Crawford novels should be very enthusiastic about this one.-"

== Awards ==
- At the 2013 Macavity Awards, An Unmarked Grave won the "Sue Feder Memorial Award for Best Historical Mystery."
- At the 2013 Agatha Awards, An Unmarked Grave was a finalist for "Best Historical Novel."
