= Search the Dark =

1996 historical mystery novel by Charles Todd

- Author: Charles Todd
- Series: Inspector Ian Rutledge Mysteries
- Genre: Historical mystery
- Publisher: William Morrow
- Publication date: 1999
- ISBN: 978-0-06-209161-1
- Preceded by: Wings of Fire
- Followed by: Legacy of the Dead

Search the Dark is the third in a series of historical mystery novels by American writers Caroline and Charles Todd, writing under the pseudonym Charles Todd, that are set immediately after World War I featuring Inspector Ian Rutledge of Scotland Yard . It was published by William Morrow, an imprint of HarperCollins, in 1999.

== Plot ==
Bert Mowbray is a soldier whose wife and children were killed in a Zeppelin raid over London in 1916 while he was in the trenches. Now it is the summer of 1919, and Mowbray is taking the train from London to Brighton to search for a job. He looks out the train window just as the train is pulling out of the small village of Singleton Magna and sees his wife comforting his crying daughter while his son and an unknown man look on. By the time the frantic Mowbray gets off the train at the next station and walks back to the village, the family is gone. Mowbray forcefully asks everyone in the village about his wife and children, but no one has seen them. The next day, a woman's body is found some ways outside of town, and Mowbray, now in a near-catatonic state, is arrested for her murder. But there is no sign of the children, and Scotland Yard Inspector Ian Rutledge, still secretly haunted by the voice of Hamish, a young Scottish soldier he executed on the battlefield, is sent to coordinate a search for them.

Rutledge looks for witnesses that might have seen the family on the train platform and learns from Simon Wyatt, scion on a politically connected family, that a young woman, Margaret Tarlton, had a job interview with him that day, and had taken the train to Singleton Magna, where his new French wife Aurore had both picked her up in Simon's automobile and returned her to the train station after the interview. To find Margaret, Rutledge goes to her current employer, Elizabeth Napier, who turns out to be Simon Wyatt's ex-fiancee, jilted when Simon returned from the war with a French wife. But Margaret has not returned to the Napier household, and there is no sign of her at her London flat, nor at her family's household.

The children, dead or alive, are still missing, but a second body is found, that of a maid who abruptly disappeared six months ago. Rutledge begins to suspect that the ex-soldier Mowbray had not seen his wife on the train platform, but instead had seen Margaret Tarlton, and it was she who was dead. Rutledge also believes that someone else murdered both Margaret and the missing maid. But who? Simon Napier, afraid that his ex-fiancee was trying to plant a spy in his household? Or his new French wife Aurore, afraid that Simon's eyes would stray to the beautiful Margaret? Or the ex-fiancee Elizabeth Napier, angry that Margaret, her trusted employee, had walked out on her to work for the man who jilted her? There is also another ex-soldier whose wits have been dimmed by a head wound, as well as the sometime boyfriend of Margaret, and it turns out that Simon's godfather might have fathered a child with Margaret.

In the end, Rutledge uses his powers of observation to solve the mystery of the missing children and uncover who the murderer of both Margaret and the missing maid must be.

== Publication history ==
In the early 1990s, Carolyn Watjen (born Carolyn Linene Teachey) convinced her son David Watjen to collaborate with her on a mystery novel. For the protagonist, they settled on Ian Rutledge, a British veteran of trench warfare during World War I who is attempting to return to his Scotland Yard career as a police detective inspector despite a severe case of shell shock. After their first novel, A Test of Wills, was nominated for several awards and won the Barry Award for Best First Novel, the writing duo followed up with more books in the series. The third book, Search the Dark, was published by William Morrow in 1999. Caroline and David, as Charles Todd, would go on to write over 20 more novels about Ian Rutledge.

== Reception ==
Publishers Weekly called it "compelling" and noted, "[The book] is rooted, in this fine period mystery, as much in love as in war."

Kirkus Reviews was disappointed, writing, "With little effort on Ian's part, all the unlikely answers come to light. A bit livelier than the author’s previous work, with plenty of suspense despite its unfocused plot, unreal people, and too- leisurely style." The review concluded, "Best for those who like their mystery melodramas written the old-fashioned way."

Writing for Library Journal, Theresa Connors commented, "For readers who enjoy historical mysteries, Charles Todd's able narration captures the local accents of the Dorset country folk well. Highly recommended."

David Pitt, writing for Booklist, pointed out, "These are not fantasy novels — and Hamish is not a ghost — but the rather odd relationship between Rutledge and the memory of the man he executed makes the stories fresh and unusual." Pitt concluded, "Not for all tastes, the Rutledge novels are well suited to readers who like their mysteries to be a little left-of-center, and this latest entry in the series will not disappoint.
