= A Long Shadow (mystery novel) =

2000 historical mystery novel by Charles Todd

- Author: Charles Todd
- Series: Inspector Ian Rutledge Mysteries
- Genre: Historical mystery
- Publisher: Willam Morrow
- Publication date: 2006
- ISBN: 978-0-06-078671-7
- Preceded by: A Cold Treachery
- Followed by: A False Mirror

Legacy of the Dead is the eighth in a series of historical mystery novels by American writers Caroline and Charles Todd, writing under the pseudonym Charles Todd, that are set immediately after World War I featuring Inspector Ian Rutledge of Scotland Yard. It was published by Willam Morrow, an imprint of HarperCollins, in 2006.

== Plot ==
After surviving four years on the Western Front, Ian Rutledge has returned to his Scotland Yard job as Detective Inspector a very damaged man. He had been forced to execute one of his own men, Hamish MacLeod, for cowardice on the battlefield, and now, more than a year after the end of the war, he continuously hears the voice of Hamish inside his head.

Leaving a seance to which he had reluctantly been dragged by his sister, Rutledge finds a bullet casing perched on the front steps of the house. A few days later, he finds another one on the seat of his automobile. Then while driving in the countryside, a shot smashes his front windscreen. Clearly Rutledge has become a target.

While Rutledge struggles to discover who is hunting him, he is sent to the village of Dudlington, where a local constable has been seriously wounded. Rutledge discovers the man, Hensley, had been discovered in Frith's Wood, a supposedly haunted woodlot, with an arrow in his back.

Rutledge wonders if the murder attempt may be related to the disappearance of 17-year-old Emma Mason. Some villagers believe she went to London to find her mother, who had abandoned her. Others think she was murdered, possibly by Hensley, and buried in Frith's Wood.

Soon it becomes apparent that almost everyone in the village, including Hensley, has secrets to hide. On top of everything, Rutledge's unseen hunter begins to taunt him, leaving a bullet on his bed and almost running him over in a stolen lorry. Then the seance medium from London, an attractive woman, arrives in Dudlington and Rutledge, attracted to her, reluctantly considers if she could have anything to do with either the missing Emma or his mysterious hunter.

Rutledge starts to look for the mother who abandoned Emma, but there is no trace of her in London or anywhere else. Rutledge finds a body buried in Frith's Woods, but it turns out to be that of a man, buried there 40 years ago. Rutledge realizes that the same person who told him that Emma's mother had fled to London had also told him that Emma's grandfather had been killed in London by a runaway horse. Rutledge begins to consider the unsavory possibility that Emma's grandfather had been murdered and buried in Frith's Woods, and that both Emma and her mother had also both been murdered by the same person. As he races to arrest the murderer, the hunter who has been taunting him with death decides that it is time to kill Rutledge.

== Publication history ==
In the early 1990s, Carolyn Watjen (born Carolyn Linene Teachey) convinced her son David Watjen to collaborate with her on a mystery novel. For the protagonist, they created Ian Rutledge, a British veteran of trench warfare during World War I who is attempting to return to his Scotland Yard career as a police detective inspector. The resultant novel was A Test of Wills, which was subsequently nominated for numerous awards, winning the Barry Award for Best First Novel.

The eighth book in the series, A Long Shadow, was published in 2006 by William Morrow, an imprint of HarperCollins. Caroline and David, as Charles Todd, would go on to write over 15 more novels in the Ian Rutledge series.

== Reception ==
Publishers Weekly noted, "Todd's plotting and characterization are, as usual, first-rate, and the tormented motivations behind the novel's dark acts are presented with a sensitivity and refinement reminiscent of the best of P.D. James." The review concluded "The ambiguous ending will leave both longtime fans and new readers anxiously awaiting the sequel."

Writing for the Historical Novel Society, Ellen Keith commented, "Heretofore, [Rutledge's] most vivid reminder of the war had come from his own conscience, in the voice of Hamish... Now he must contend with another's idea of the punishment he deserves." Keith also noted, "A new character, a medium, is introduced, and she proves to be compelling enough that I hope for her reappearance in future books." Keith concluded, "Todd (a mother-son writing team) has provided another reason to hope for a ninth in the series."

Kirkus Reviews stated, "Aided by the ghostly presence of Hamish MacLeod, the world's most unusual Watson, Rutledge pursues the truth despite the villagers' denials, and despite his uneasy certainty that someone has followed him from London determined to kill him." The review concluded, "Incisive as ever, though this time Todd's usual slow start is bookended by a conclusion that daringly leaves several loose ends hanging."
