= Simon & Schuster Mary Higgins Clark Award =

American literary award presented as part of the Edgar Awards

The Simon & Schuster Mary Higgins Clark Award, established in 2001, is an American literary award, presented as part of the Edgar Awards. The award was created to honor author of suspense novels, Mary Higgins Clark.

To be eligible for the Simon & Schuster Mary Higgins Clark Award, the book must be "written in the Mary Higgins Clark tradition according to guidelines set forth by Mary Higgins Clark:

- "The protagonist is a nice young woman whose life is suddenly invaded.
- "She’s self-made and independent, with primarily good family relationships.
- "She has an interesting job.
- "She is not looking for trouble–she is doing exactly what she should be doing and something cuts across her bow.
- "She solves her problem by her own courage and intelligence.
- "The story has no on-scene violence.
- "The story has no strong four-letter words or explicit sex scenes."

== Recipients ==
=== 2000s ===
Mary Higgins Clark Award winners and finalists, 2001–2009
Year	Author	Title	Result	Ref.
2001	Barbara D'Amato	Authorized Personnel Only	Winner	
2001	Robert Crais	Demolition Angel	Shortlist	
2001	Lynn Hightower	The Debt Collector	Shortlist	
2001	Lelia Kelly	False Witness	Shortlist	
2001	Jodi Picoult	Plain Truth	Shortlist	
2002	Judith Kelman	Summer of Storms	Winner	
2002	Rhys Bowen	Murphy's Law	Shortlist	
2002	M. K. Preston	Perhaps She'll Die	Shortlist	
2002	Denise Swanson	Murder of a Sweet Old Lady	Shortlist	
2003	Rose Connors	Absolute Certainty	Winner	
2003	Karen Harper	The Stone Forest	Shortlist	
2003	Nancy Pickard	The Truth Hurts	Shortlist	
2003	Laura Van Wormer	The Bad Witness	Shortlist	
2004	M. K. Preston	Song of the Bones	Winner	
2004	Nancy Baker Jacobs	Ricochet	Shortlist	
2004	Katherine Hall Page	The Body in the Lighthouse	Shortlist	
2004	Sujata Massey	Samurai's Daughter	Shortlist	
2004	Virginia Lanier	A Bloodhound to Die For	Shortlist	
2005	Rochelle Krich	Grave Endings	Winner	
2005	Jerrilyn Farmer	Perfect Sax	Shortlist	
2005	Carol Goodman	The Drowning Tree	Shortlist	
2005	Christiane Heggan	Scent of a Killer	Shortlist	
2005	P.B. Ryan	Murder in a Mill Town	Shortlist	
2006	Karen Harper	Dark Angel	Winner	
2006	Jo Bannister	Breaking Faith	Shortlist	
2006	Gwen Hunter	Shadow Valley	Shortlist	
2007	Fiona Mountain	Bloodline	Winner	
2008	Sandi Ault	Wild Inferno	Winner	
2008	Sarah Andrews	In Cold Pursuit	Shortlist	
2008	Karen Harper	Inferno	Shortlist	
2008	Judith Kelman	The First Stone	Shortlist	
2009	Bill Floyd	The Killer's Wife	Winner	
2009	Betsy Thornton	A Song for You	Shortlist	
2009	S. J. Bolton	Sacrifice	Shortlist	
2009	Julie Kramer	Stalking Susan	Shortlist	
2009	Louise Ure	The Fault Tree	Shortlist	

=== 2010s ===
Mary Higgins Clark Award winners and finalists, 2010–2019
Year	Author	Title	Result	Ref.
2010	S. J. Bolton	Awakening	Winner	
2010	Blaize Clement	Cat Sitter on a Hot Tin Roof	Shortlist	
2010	Nadia Gordon	Lethal Vintage	Shortlist	
2010	Hallie Ephron	Never Tell a Lie	Shortlist	
2010	Susan Kandel	Dial H for Hitchcock	Shortlist	
2011	Elly Griffiths	The Crossing Places	Winner	
2011	S. J. Bolton	Blood Harvest	Shortlist	
2011	Karen Harper	Down River	Shortlist	
2011	Wendy Corsi Staub	Live to Tell	Shortlist	
2011	Sandi Ault	Wild Penance	Shortlist	
2012	Sara J. Henry	Learning to Swim	Winner	
2012	S. J. Bolton	Now You See Me	Shortlist	
2012	Hallie Ephron	Come and Find Me	Shortlist	
2012	Janice Hamrick	Death on Tour	Shortlist	
2012	Tracy Kiely	Murder Most Persuasive	Shortlist	
2013	Hank Phillippi Ryan	The Other Woman	Winner	
2013	Rebecca Cantrell	A City of Broken Glass	Shortlist	
2013	S. J. Bolton	Dead Scared	Shortlist	
2013	Wendy Corsi Staub	Sleepwalker	Shortlist	
2013	Jane Casey	The Reckoning	Shortlist	
2014	Jenny Milchman	Cover of Snow	Winner	
2014	Hallie Ephron	There Was an Old Woman	Shortlist	
2014	Susan Froetschel	Fear of Beauty	Shortlist	
2014	Katia Lief	The Money Kill	Shortlist	
2014	Linda Stasi	The Sixth Station	Shortlist	
2015	Jane Casey	The Stranger You Know	Winner	
2015	Sharon Bolton	A Dark and Twisted Tide	Shortlist	
2015	Julia Dahl	Invisible City	Shortlist	
2015	Julia Keller	Summer of the Dead	Shortlist	
2015	Lori Rader-Day	The Black Hour	Shortlist	
2016	Lori Rader-Day	Little Pretty Things	Winner	
2016	Frances Brody	A Woman Unknown	Shortlist	
2016	Susanna Calkins	The Masque of a Murderer	Shortlist	
2016	Hallie Ephron	Night Night, Sleep Tight	Shortlist	
2016	Catriona McPherson	The Child Garden	Shortlist	
2017	Charles Todd	The Shattered Tree	Winner	
2017	Dianne Dixon	The Other Sister	Shortlist	
2017	Catriona McPherson	Quiet Neighbors	Shortlist	
2017	Hank Phillippi Ryan	Say No More	Shortlist	
2017	Wendy Corsi Staub	Blue Moon	Shortlist	
2018	Carol Goodman	The Widow's House	Winner	
2018	Ellen Crosby	The Vineyard Victims	Shortlist	
2018	Hallie Ephron	You'll Never Know Dear	Shortlist	
2018	Nadine Nettmann	Uncorking a Lie	Shortlist	
2018	Lori Rader-Day	The Day I Died	Shortlist	
2019	Sujata Massey	The Widows of Malabar Hill	Winner	
2019	Mariah Fredericks	A Death of No Importance	Shortlist	
2019	Dianne Freeman	A Lady’s Guide to Etiquette and Murder	Shortlist	
2019	Julia Keller	Bone on Bone	Shortlist	
2019	Paula Munier	A Borrowing of Bones	Shortlist	

=== 2020s ===
Mary Higgins Clark Award winners and finalists, 2020–present
Year	Author	Title	Result	Ref.
2020	Carol Goodman	The Night Visitors	Winner	
2020	Tara Laskowski	One Night Gone	Shortlist	
2020	Catriona McPherson	Strangers at the Gate	Shortlist	
2020	Emma Rowley	Where the Missing Go	Shortlist	
2020	Hank Phillippi Ryan	The Murder List	Shortlist	
2021	Elsa Hart	The Cabinets of Barnaby Mayne	Winner	
2021	Mariah Fredericks	Death of an American Beauty	Shortlist	
2021	Hank Phillippi Ryan	The First to Lie	Shortlist	
2021	Lori Rader-Day	The Lucky One	Shortlist	
2021	Paige Shelton	Cold Wind	Shortlist	
2022	Naomi Hirahara	Clark and Division	Winner	
2022	Elizabeth Penney	Chapter and Curse	Shortlist	
2022	Tracy Gardner	Ruby Red Herring	Shortlist	
2022	Katherine Cowley	The Secret Life of Miss Mary Bennet	Shortlist	
2022	Callie Hutton	The Sign of Death	Shortlist	
2023	B. R. Myers	A Dreadful Splendor	Winner	
2023	Amanda Flower	Because I Could Not Stop for Death	Shortlist	
2023	Sulari Gentill	The Woman in the Library	Shortlist	
2023	Carol Goodman	The Disinvited Guest	Shortlist	
2023	D. M. Rowell	Never Name the Dead	Shortlist	
2024	Lina Chern	Play the Fool	Winner	
2024	Carol Goodman	The Bones of the Story	Shortlist	
2024	Anastasia Hastings	Of Manners and Murder	Shortlist	
2024	Kate Robards	The Three Deaths of Willa Stannard	Shortlist	
2024	Mary Winters	Murder in Postscript	Shortlist	
2025	Sulari Gentill	The Mystery Writer	Winner	
2026	Hank Phillippi Ryan	All This Could Be Yours	Winner	
