= Watchers of Time =

2001 historical mystery novel by Charles Todd

- Author: Charles Todd
- Series: Inspector Ian Rutledge Mysteries
- Genre: Historical mystery
- Publisher: Willam Morrow
- Publication date: 2001
- ISBN: 978-0-553-58316-8
- Preceded by: Legacy of the Dead
- Followed by: A Fearsome Doubt

Watcher of Time is the fifth in a series of historical mystery novels by American writers Caroline and Charles Todd, writing under the pseudonym Charles Todd, that are set immediately after World War I featuring Inspector Ian Rutledge of Scotland Yard. It was published by Bantam Books in 2001.

== Plot ==
After surviving four years on the Western Front, Ian Rutledge has returned to his Scotland Yard job as Detective Inspector a very damaged man. He had been forced to execute one of his own men, Hamish MacLeod, for cowardice on the battlefield, and now, almost a year after the end of the war, he continuously hears the voice of Hamish inside his head.

In the village of Osterly, Herbert Baker, a local man on his deathbed, and a staunch Anglican, surprises his family by asking for the local Roman Catholic priest, Father James, to attend. The two had a private conversation for thirty minutes before the priest left. Baker died a few hours later. Two weeks later as Father James entered his darkened study, someone struck him from behind, killing him.

Ian Rutledge is sent down from London to aid the local police, but by the time he arrives, the Osterly police have already arrested Matthew Walsh, an outsider. The police believe robbery was the motive — the priest's study had been trashed and a small amount of money was missing, leading the police to believe that Father James had surprised Walsh while he was stealing the money.

But Rutledge is unconvinced. Father James had been struck from behind, as if someone had been waiting in ambush. And more valuable items had been left untouched, which spoke against burglary being the motive. Rutledge begins to dig into the past of Father James and discovers that Father James had been obsessed with the 1912 sinking of the Titanic, collecting clippings and annotating photographs and lists of both of the survivors and those who had drowned. This was the second time that Rutledge had recently heard the name Titanic, for it had come up in conversation that Lord Sedgewick's daughter-in-law, Virginia, fleeing from her marriage to the lord's older son some seven years ago, had booked passage on the Titanic to return to her American family, and had gone down with the ship. But as Father James' clippings show, her name was originally not on the passenger list, but only appeared a few days after the tragedy. Rutledge also discovers that while Virginia had been beautiful, she had also been developmentally handicapped, possessing the mental acuity of a 7-year old. The Sedgewick family had not realized this until after the marriage, arranged with Virginia's American family, had taken place. The Sedgewicks, unwilling to let anyone else in British high society know about this, isolated her. Eventually Virginia had slipped away from the Sedgewick chauffeur during a shopping trip, and apparently made her way to Southampton, where she bought passage on the Titanic.

Rutledge also discovers that Herbert Baker, the dying man who had asked for Father James to come to his deathbed, had been the Sedgewicks' chauffeur, and had driven Virginia Sedgewick to town the day she had slipped away from him to make her way to the Titanic. Had he seen or heard something that day, and had shared this with Father James?

Then Matthew Walsh escapes from jail. A local farmer reports one of his horses has been stolen, and Walsh is discovered dead, apparently kicked in the temple by the horse. But Rutledge has seen this type of wound before and believes Walsh was murdered by a blow from a hammer or mallet.

Rutledge starts to believe that the disappearance of Virginia Sedgewick in 1912 and the deaths of Father James and Matthew Walsh are all connected.

But for Rutledge to go over the heads of the local constabulary, who believe the case has been solved, and directly confront the guilty will put his career on the line.

== Publication history ==
In the early 1990s, Carolyn Watjen (born Carolyn Linene Teachey) convinced her son David Watjen to collaborate with her on a mystery novel. For the protagonist, they settled on Ian Rutledge, a British veteran of trench warfare during World War I who is attempting to return to his Scotland Yard career as a police detective inspector. The resultant novel was A Test of Wills, which was subsequently nominated for numerous awards, winning the Barry Award for Best First Novel.

The fifth book in the series, Watchers of Time, was published in 2001 by William Morrow, an imprint of HarperCollins Caroline and David, as Charles Todd, would go on to write over 20 more novels in the Ian Rutledge series.

== Reception ==
Publishers Weekly thought the action was too slow, calling the novel "tiresomely paced ... The book's overall theme is a compelling one: questions of guilt and responsibility after the debacle that was WWI. But the tangle of motives and intrigue that surrounds the priest's murder is too complex (and, ultimately, too trivial) to support such a theme." The review concluded, "Like previous entries in this series, this one is psychologically astute, but the narrative becomes too bogged down with the author's desire to portray postwar English village life and too weighted with the enormity of its themes."

Writing for the Historical Novel Society, Claire Morris Bernard commented, "[Rutledge], and the many characters in this novel, appear very real. Meticulous description of these people and their environment evokes both time and place. But I felt there was too much description; the novel sometimes meandered, as if the author hesitated to act. That said, it held my attention, and the mystery proved impossible to solve until the final pages."

J. Kingston Pierce, writing for January Magazine, stated, "[Todd's] plots are densely layered with prevarications and misleading leads and messy human emotions. Todd takes extraordinary care in fleshing out the characters at all levels of his stories." Pierce concluded, "While it might be good to give Rutledge a non-rural case in the future, maybe force him to interact more with some of his fellow London coppers, it's hard to argue with the success that Todd and Rutledge have enjoyed thus far. These books may not be classic police procedurals, but they are certainly arresting."
