= Legacy of the Dead =

2000 historical mystery novel by Charles Todd

- Author: Charles Todd
- Series: Inspector Ian Rutledge Mysteries
- Genre: Historical mystery
- Publisher: Bantam Books
- Publication date: 2000
- ISBN: 978-0-553-58315-1
- Preceded by: Search the Dark
- Followed by: Watchers of Time

Legacy of the Dead is the fourth in a series of historical mystery novels by American writers Caroline and Charles Todd, writing under the pseudonym Charles Todd, that are set immediately after World War I featuring Inspector Ian Rutledge of Scotland Yard . It was published by Bantam Books in 2000, and was nominated for an Anthony Award.

== Plot ==
Ian Rutledge has returned to his job as Detective Inspector a very damaged man after four years on the Western Front. He had been forced to execute one of his own men, Hamish MacLeod, for cowardice on the battlefield, and now, even six months after the end of the war, he continuously hears the voice of Hamish inside his head.

Fiona MacDonald, a single woman with a 3-year-old child, is a newcomer to the village of Duncarrick, Scotland. After a serious of anonymous poison pen letters sent to various villagers accuse her of wantonness, and that her child belongs to another woman, she is shunned by the village. The skeleton of a woman is then found in another part of Scotland, and the police arrest Fiona on suspicion of murdering the woman and stealing her child.

The local police try to interview Lady Maude Gray on her estate near Durham, England because they believe her daughter Eleanor is the murder victim. However, Lady Maude refuses to meet with them. Ian Rutledge of Scotland Yard is sent to intervene, and succeeds in gaining an interview with Lady Maude. She admits that she and Eleanor had had a falling out in 1916, but she refuses to countenance that Eleanor is dead or that she was ever in Scotland; she believes that her daughter has gone to America to become a doctor. At first Lady Maude refuses to have anything to do with the investigation, but then relents and tells Rutledge to go to Scotland and ascertain the identity of the dead woman.

Rutledge goes to Duncarrick to interview the accused murderer and recognizes her from photographs Hamish showed to him during the war — she was Hamish's fiancee. Fiona in turn recognizes Rutledge's name from both from Hamish's letters from the front, and from the letter Rutledge sent to her following Hamish's death. Fiona admits the child is not her own, but refuses to reveal the name of the mother, although she swears the mother is still alive.

Rutledge cannot interfere with the case the local police have against Fiona, but concentrates on his task to find Lady Maude's daughter Eleanor. He is able to trace her to London in 1916, where she was a suffragette and volunteered her time in hospitals. She worked with a Scottish officer to bring bagpipers to play at hospitals with Scottish patients. As her mother suspected, she was planning to go to America, and had arranged through a friend for a letter of introduction that would gain her admittance to medical school, but she had never picked up the letter. By some accounts, she apparently was smitten with the Scottish officer, and told a friend she was going up to Scotland for a fortnight. Rutledge is able to trace her to the Scottish officer's house in Scotland, but realizes she had arrived there after the Scottish officer had returned to the Front and been killed during the Battle of the Somme offensive. So who had driven her there? And Rutledge can find no trace of her after that.

Rutledge wonders if Eleanor had been pregnant with the Scottish officer's child, and hid out in Scotland in order to have the baby, and then had given it to Fiona to raise? Or did she meet Fiona and Fiona killed her and took the baby?

Facing a dead end with regard to Eleanor, Rutledge then tries to find some trace of the baby. At a small Scottish medical clinic, he finds records of an unknown woman named Mary who had arrived in the summer of 1916, had given birth to a child, and then had left. Rutledge realizes "Mary" couldn't be Eleanor, since the baby was born only two months after Eleanor had left London, when she hadn't been visibly pregnant. So was Fiona telling the truth, and "Mary" was still alive and had given Fiona her baby? If so, why?

And why had Fiona been singled out for the poison pen letters? Was she the target? Or was writer simply trying to get her out of the way to get to the 3-year-old child?

In the end, Rutledge pieces together who the poison pen writer had been, which woman had given birth to the child, why the mother had given the baby to Fiona, and what had happened to Eleanor.

In the climactic showdown, Rutledge must use all of his trench warfare experience to survive as he faces off against his opponent in a pitch black room, armed only with a small dirk.

== Publication history ==
In the early 1990s, Carolyn Watjen (born Carolyn Linene Teachey) convinced her son David Watjen to collaborate with her on a mystery novel. For the protagonist, they settled on Ian Rutledge, a British veteran of trench warfare during World War I who is attempting to return to his Scotland Yard career as a police detective inspector. The resultant novel was A Test of Wills, which was subsequently nominated for numerous awards, winning the Barry Award for Best First Novel.

The fourth book in the series, Legacy of the Dead, was published in 2000 by Bantam Books and was nominated for an Anthony Award for "Best Novel." Caroline and David, as Charles Todd, would go on to write over 20 more novels in the Ian Rutledge series.

== Reception ==
Jane Chelius, writing for Publishers Weekly, was not impressed, noting that the book "focuses narrowly on the question: is there a link between Fiona and Eleanor? Since the answer is never in doubt, there's not much to absorb suspense addicts, as Rutledge slogs through Scotland trying to break the apparently deadlocked circumstantial case. The resolution, implicating too many peripheral characters, is particularly unsatisfying." Chelius concluded, "But readers will continue to be captivated by Todd's portrait of the dangerously unraveling detective, and his equally incisive evocation of the grieving postwar world."

Writing for the Historical Novel Society, Wendy Zollo called this book "Suspenseful, intriguing, absorbing, compelling ... This novel tells a forceful tale abounding with twists and disturbing characters." Zollo also noted, "Todd keeps the reader entranced with a thoroughly developed conspiracy and splendidly defined characters. The suspense is tightly woven, keeping the reader speculating till the very last chapter." Zollo concluded, "Legacy of the Dead is a daunting mystery-thriller of the old school. It never sputters or drags, but pushes forward in a most compellingly calculated manner. Todd has created a novel so finely wrought with suspense it’s practically impossible to put down before reaching its disturbing, masterful conclusion."

Kirkus Reviews called it a "richly tangled mystery, which continues to borrow its storytelling conventions from the 1919 period of its setting." The review concluded, "More Q&A than a season with Regis Philbin, but the creeping drive toward Todd's powerful climactic revelations will make it all worthwhile for readers who go the distance"
