= A Bitter Truth =

2010 historical mystery novel by Charles Todd

- Author: Charles Todd
- Series: Bess Crawford Mysteries
- Genre: Historical mystery
- Publisher: William Morrow
- Publication date: 2011
- ISBN: 978-0-06-201571-6
- Preceded by: An Impartial Witness
- Followed by: An Unmarked Grave

A Bitter Truth is the third in a series of historical mystery novels by American writers Caroline and Charles Todd, writing under the pseudonym Charles Todd, that are set in and after World War I featuring the army nurse Bess Crawford. It was published by William Morrow, an imprint of HarperCollins, in 2011.

== Plot ==
It is December 1917, and Bess Crawford, a British army nurse serving on the Western Front, has been given leave to return to England for Christmas. She finds a bruised and shivering woman sheltering in the doorway of her flat, and invites her inside. The woman, Lydia Ellis, fled to London when her husband Roger, an officer on leave, struck her during an argument. Bess drives Lydia back to her family home in Vixen Hill and meets the family, who are gathered to mourn the loss of Roger's older brother, an officer who died of his wounds.

Bess notices a portrait of an enchanting young girl, Roger's younger sister Juliana, who died of a brain tumor shortly after the portrait was finished. Roger's father, mentally overthrown by this loss, had committed suicide some time after her death. It is Juliana that caused an argument between Lydia and her husband Roger to turn violent. Lydia longs for a baby, but Roger has been distant and cold since his return from the trenches. When Lydia asked if he was afraid a child might supplant his memory of Juliana, Roger struck her and she fled to London. Another point of contention between them is Davis Merritt, a officer blinded in the war and living in the nearby village. At the request of the local vicar, Lydia has been reading to him, and Roger suspects they are having an affair, something that Lydia furiously denies.

Family and friends gather for a dinner party that evening, and George, a longtime friend of Roger's and a fellow officer, is overheard by many telling Roger that he saw an orphan in France that was the spitting image of Juliana. Most people take this to mean that the child is the product of an affair that Roger has had with a French woman.

The next morning, George is found dead near the local church, murdered with a blow to the back of his head. Suspicion immediately falls on Roger, after George's revelation about a possible love child. But Davis Merritt, the blind officer, is also missing from the village. Could he be the murderer? Or did Roger kill both of them, taking care of two problems at once?

There is not enough evidence to charge Roger, so Bess returns to France and resumes her work as nurse. With the help of an Australian sergeant, she finds the orphaned child who resembles the late Juliana. The mother had died shortly after childbirth and the father was killed in the trenches, so the child is now in the care of nuns. Bess also runs into Roger, who confesses that he did have an affair with the mother of the child, but he had been unaware the child until George had told everyone about the orphan he had seen in France. Rather than being angry with George for revealing his affair, he was grateful that he had been given the chance to find the child.

Bess is recalled to England for an inquest — the body of Davis Merritt, the blind soldier, has been found, and he also had been murdered by a blow to the head. Bess asks family friend Simon Brandon to find out if there had been a link between George and Davis, the two murder victims, possibly while they had been serving in France. Then the Australian sergeant appears in England with the little French orphan — there had been a fire at the orphanage, and he had rescued her and brought her to Bess. Roger's family finds out about the child and start the steps to properly adopt her.

Simon Brandon appears with the news that the two murder victims, George and Davis, both served on a court martial of a soldier accused of murdering his superior officer. Although the man was acquitted, he escaped and hasn't been seen since. Suddenly Bess puts all the pieces together, and knows that the murderer has been in plain sight all along.

== Publication history ==
Following the success of their first mystery series revolving around Inspector Ian Rutledge, the writing duo of Caroline and Charles Todd decided to start another series, this one about war nurse Bess Crawford, who, before World War I, circulated in the same upper class social circles as Ian Rutledge. The result was A Duty to the Dead, published by William Morrow, an imprint of HarperCollins, in 2009. The third book in the series, A Bitter Truth, was published in 2011. Charles Todd would go on to write eleven more titles in the Bess Crawford series.

== Reception ==
Kirkus Reviews was disappointed, commenting "The least believable tale from the Todd partnership finds Bess, Roger and the Aussie traipsing all over France and England and bumping into each other. Still, few writers surpass Todd in depicting the insanity of war."

Muriel Dobbin, in the Washington Post, noted "Mr. Todd's characterization is always sensitive." However, Dobbin found the family scenes a bit trying, and was relieved that "Mr. Todd wisely shifts his scene to the war in France, a lost child and an ebullient Australian sergeant." Dobbin concluded, "Of course, she saves the child and finds the killer, whose identity isn't too difficult to guess, and as her father says, Bess isn't afraid of anything. Nor should she be. The reader can look forward to finding her again."

Writing for The Mercury News, Roberta Alexander found the plot and characters too similar to the first two books of this series, commenting, "While I like this series, in part for its sympathetic and knowledgeable depiction of the war, both on the front and at home, I found this book very like its two predecessors. I don't want to read the same book again with a different cover."

Susie Boyce, writing for Deseret News, commented, "Charles Todd, a mother-and-son writing team, combines believable characters, gut-wrenching suspense and a sobering commentary on the ravages of war." Boyce liked the novel, writing, "Readers familiar with the Bess Crawford series will find A Bitter Truth at least as engaging, if not more so, than her previous two mysteries." However Boyce warned, "In all of its complexity, the book can be confusing at times. Some passages beg re-reading as a means of clarification, especially in the final chapters as the story reaches its conclusion." Boyce concluded, "Overall, readers will enjoy the complex characters, significant amount of intrigue and the surprising conclusion offered in A Bitter Truth."
