= A Duty to the Dead =

2010 historical mystery novel by Charles Todd

- Author: Charles Todd
- Series: Bess Crawford Mysteries
- Genre: Historical mystery
- Publisher: William Morrow
- Publication date: 2009
- ISBN: 978-0-06-179176-5
- Followed by: An Impartial Witness

A Duty to the Dead is the first in a series of historical mystery novels by American writers Caroline and Charles Todd, writing under the pseudonym Charles Todd, that are set in and after World War I featuring the army nurse Bess Crawford. It was published by William Morrow, an imprint of HarperCollins, in 2009.

== Plot ==
Bess Crawford, a British army nurse serving on the hospital ship HMS Britannic in 1916, is asked by a dying soldier, Arthur Graham, to pass a cryptic message on to his younger brother Jonathan: "Tell my brother Jonathan that I lied. I did it for Mother's sake. But it has to be set right." Shortly after Graham dies, Bess is injured when the Britannic hits a mine and sinks. While convalescing in England, Bess travels to the village of Owlhurst to visit Arthur's mother and her two surviving sons Jonathan and Timothy. Bess delivers Arthur's message to Jonathan and is surprised when he doesn't seem to respond to the message.

Bess is invited to stay with the Grahams for the night, and while walking through the village, she is called to help the local doctor who is trying to treat a soldier suffering from shell shock. After they calm the patient and give him a sedative, the doctor shares with her that Mrs. Graham actually has another son who is still alive — or actually, a stepson. Although the doctor is new to the village — his predecessor died in an unexplained accident — local gossip has it that the stepson was of low intelligence, a violent and troubled soul, and had killed a woman with a knife when he was 14. With the agreement of the local magistrate, constable, doctor and rector, the boy was confined to an asylum, and has been there for the past decade.

That evening, the Graham family receives the news that the stepson, Peregrine, has fallen ill with pneumonia and is expected to die if he remains at the asylum. Bess agrees to nurse him, and the ill man is delivered to the Graham house. Bess manages to save his life, but during his slow convalescence, she is troubled because Peregrine does not seem to fit the personality that had been described to her. Although ill and obviously troubled by his experiences in the asylum, the young man seems intelligent and thoughtful.

As soon as Mrs. Graham hears that Peregrine is out of danger, she insists he be sent back to the asylum although he is still ill. Later in the day, word reaches the Graham family that Peregrine has escaped from the asylum. On her return to London, Bess discovers Peregrine hiding in her flat. After his conversations with her, he is starting to remember flashes of memory from the fateful evening, and he needs to discover what actually happened. Bess agrees to help him and returns to Owlhurst to do some digging.

She discovers that of the four people who decided Peregrine's fate, only the magistrate is still alive. Over the past five years, the constable, the rector and the doctor have all died under varying circumstances. She also discovers that the dead woman was a young maid who was looking after the four boys on her own. And she discovers that Peregrine had been totally catatonic after the murder.

With Peregrine starting to remember more and more of the evening, Bess becomes convinced that Peregrine was drugged and framed for the murder by his stepmother, who was unwilling to surrender the real murderer, likely one of her three sons. Bess also believes that Mrs. Graham forced Arthur, then just a boy, to lie about his step-brother's role in the murder, a lie that Arthur as an adult came to regret on his death bed; hence the message to Jonathan via Bess to repent and reveal the truth.

But Jonathan, unwilling to do this, apprehends Peregrine with the assistance of the police, and heads back to Owlhurst to deliver Peregrine to the asylum. Bess, knowing an injustice is being done, frantically follows in a borrowed car, and comes across a horrific scene that confirms all of her suspicions.

== Publication history ==
Following the success of their first mystery series revolving around Inspector Ian Rutledge, the writing duo of Caroline and Charles Todd decided to start another series, this one about war nurse Bess Crawford, who, before World War I, was part of the same upper class social circles as Ian Rutledge. The result was A Duty to the Dead, published by William Morrow, an imprint of HarperCollins, in 2010. Charles Todd would go on to write thirteen more titles in the Bess Crawford series.

== Reception ==
Publishers Weekly noted "Fans of independent women sleuths like Maisie Dobbs will welcome this new addition to their ranks."

Kirkus Reviews commented "Will readers miss Inspector Rutledge? You bet. But anyone who cares to loll in early-20th century English villages and mores and follow a plucky heroine as she confronts the stupidity of war will find solace in this old-fashioned mystery."

Library Journal wrote, "Todd employs all the elements of a satisfying cozy mystery, with an absorbing plot and a charismatic heroine that will leave the reader wanting more. Highly recommended, especially for fans of Jacqueline Winspear's Maisie Dobbs series."

New York Times found the new heroine to be complex, writing, "Neither as tradition-bound as Hester Latterly, her 19th-century predecessor, nor as enlightened as Maisie Dobbs, who was a student of Freudian psychology, Todd's heroine is a new woman — and her own woman. Pragmatic in the face of danger, she takes a brave stand on behalf of the mentally wounded, their suffering worsened by the isolation imposed on them through the fear and ignorance of the people who once loved them. In the process, she becomes the champion of all those lost and forgotten in war."

== Awards ==
At the 2010 Macavity Awards, A Duty to the Dead was a finalist in the category "Best Historical Novel."
