= Caroline Todd =

Caroline Todd is the name of:

- Caroline and Charles Todd, American mystery novelists
- Caroline Todd (Green Wing character), a character in the British sitcom Green Wing
