= Maisie Dobbs series =

Series of historical mystery novels by Jacqueline Winspear

Maisie Dobbs
- Author: Jacqueline Winspear
- Language: English
- Genre: historical mystery, war novel
- Publisher: Soho Crime; Macmillan Publishers; HarperCollins
- Published: 2003—2024
- No. of books: 18

Maisie Dobbs is a series of eighteen historical mystery novels by English writer Jacqueline Winspear. The novels, set between 1929 and 1945, follow the adventures of private investigator and former World War I field nurse Maisie Dobbs, and examine the impacts of war on ordinary people. The series begins with Maisie Dobbs (2003) and ends with The Comfort of Ghosts (2024).

== Development and publication ==
Jacqueline Winspear became deeply interested in World War I and its after effects because of her grandfather, who was severely wounded and shell-shocked after the Battle of the Somme in 1916. At first she did not set out to write a war novel, but her deep interest in history provided a framework for the character of Maisie Dobbs to develop. In what she describes as "a moment of artistic grace", Winspear says the character of Maisie Dobbs developed in her mind while stuck in traffic.

Winspear describes the novels as "a blend of war story, historical fiction, and mystery."

The series' debut novel, Maisie Dobbs, was published in 2003 by Soho Crime and won the Agatha Award for Best First Novel. From 2005 to 2009, the series was published by Macmillan. From 2010 to 2022, the series was published by HarperCollins. The final installment in the series, The Comfort of Ghosts, was published by Soho Crime. In an interview, the author stated that she had long planned for The Comfort of Ghosts (2024) to be the final book in the series.

== Film rights ==
In 2021, HiddenLight Productions, a production company owned by Hillary Clinton and Chelsea Clinton, acquired the film and television rights to the Maisie Dobbs novels.

== Titles ==
- Maisie Dobbs (2003)
- Birds of a Feather (2004)
- Pardonable Lies (2005)
- Messenger of Truth (2006)
- An Incomplete Revenge (2008)
- Among the Mad (2009)
- The Mapping of Love and Death (2010)
- A Lesson in Secrets (2011)
- Elegy for Eddie (2012)
- Leaving Everything Most Loved (2013)
- A Dangerous Place (2015)
- Journey to Munich (2016)
- In This Grave Hour (2017)
- To Die But Once (2018)
- The American Agent (2019)
- The Consequences of Fear (2021)
- A Sunlit Weapon (2022)
- The Comfort of Ghosts (2024)
