= Carol Goodman =

American novelist

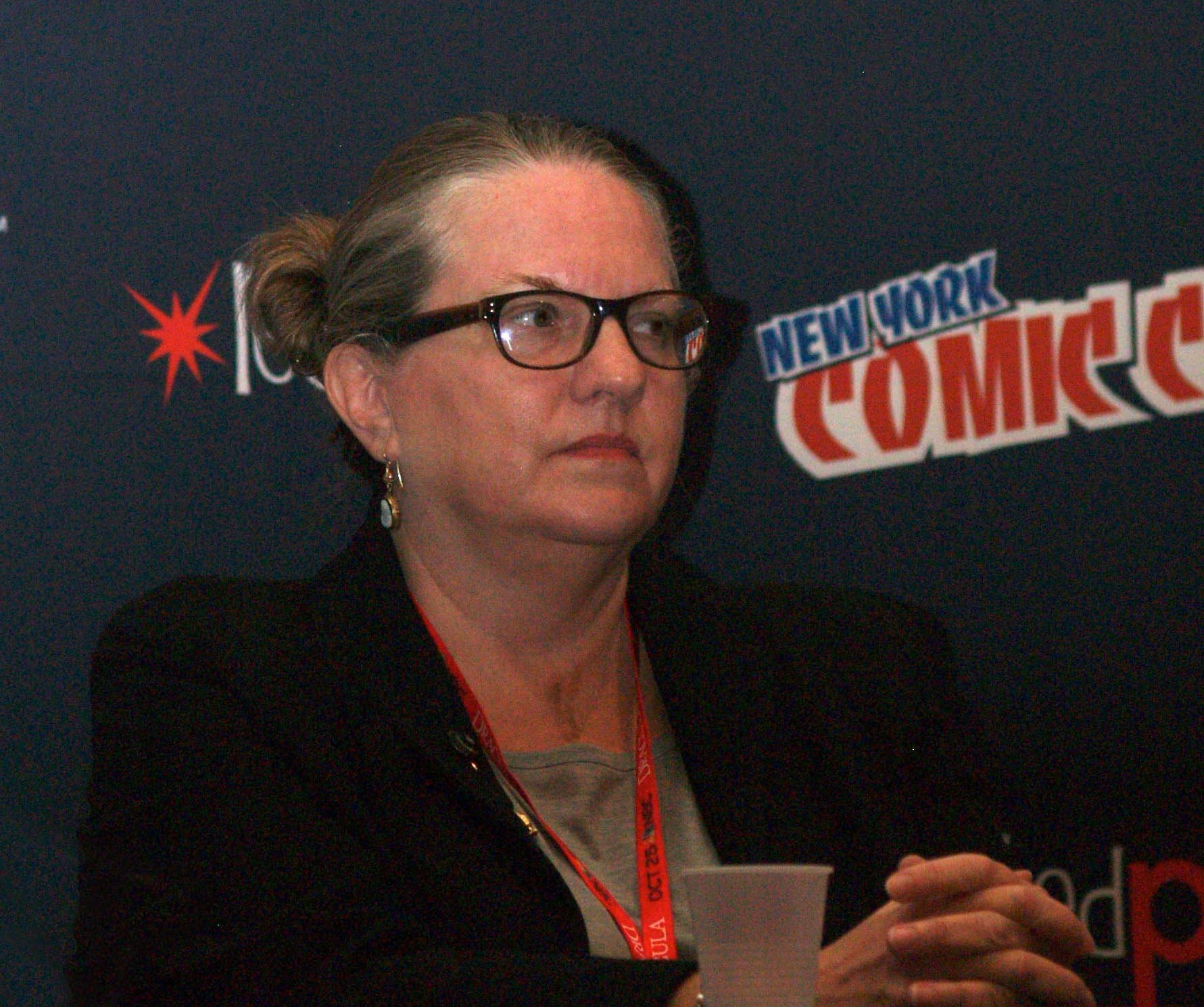
- Goodman in 2013
- Occupations: Professor; author
- Spouse: Lee Slonimsky
- Writing career
- Pen name: Juliet Dark; Lee Carroll
- Genre: Gothic fiction

Carol Goodman, also known under the pseudonym Juliet Dark, is an American professor and author of gothic fiction who has also written under the pseudonym Lee Carroll with her husband Lee Slonimsky. She is the two-time winner of the Mary Higgins Clark Award and winner of the Hammett Prize in 2003 for her novel Seduction of Water. Goodman serves as a creative writing professor at the State University of New York at New Paltz.

== Published works ==
- The Lake of Dead Languages (2002, Ballantine Books)
- The Seduction of Water (2003, Ballantine Books)
- The Drowning Tree (2004, Ballantine Books)
- The Ghost Orchid (2006, Ballantine Books)
- The Sonnet Lover (2007, Ballantine Books)
- The Night Villa (2008, Ballantine Books)
- Arcadia Falls (2010, Ballantine Books)
- River Road (2016, Touchstone Books)
- The Widow's House (2017, William Morrow and Company)
- The Metropolitans (2017, Viking Press)
- The Other Mother (William Morrow and Company, 2018)
- The Night Visitors (William Morrow and Company, 2019)
- The Sea of Lost Girls (William Morrow and Company, 2020)
- The Stranger Behind You (William Morrow and Company, 2021)
- The Disinvited Guest (William Morrow and Company, 2022)
- The Bones of the Story (William Morrow and Company, 2023)
- Return to Wyldcliffe Heights (William Morrow and Company, 2024)
- Writers and Liars (William Morrow and Company, 2025)
- Our Marriage Is Murder (William Morrow and Company, 2026)

=== The Fairwick Chronicles (as Juliet Dark) ===
1. The Demon Lover (2011, Ballantine Books)
2. The Water Witch (2012, Ballantine Books)
3. The Angel Stone (2013, Ballantine Books)

=== Black Swan Rising (as Lee Carroll, with Lee Slominsky) ===
1. Black Swan Rising (2010, Tor Books)
2. The Watchtower (2011, Tor Books)
3. The Shape Stealer (2013, Bantam Press)

=== Blythewood Trilogy ===
1. Blythewood (2013, Viking Books for Young Readers)
2. Ravencliffe (2014, Viking Books for Young Readers)
3. Hawthorn (2015, Viking Books for Young Readers)

== Awards ==
Carol Goodman received the Hammett Prize in 2003 for The Seduction of Water. She has been nominated for the Mary Higgins Clark Award five times and has won twice for her novels The Widow's House (2018) and The Night Visitors (2020).
