= The Lake of Dead Languages =

2002 novel by Carol Goodman

- Author: Carol Goodman
- Cover artist: Mats Widén/Photonica
- Language: English
- Genre: Mystery
- Publisher: Ballantine Books
- Publication date: January 2002
- Publication place: USA
- Media type: Book
- Pages: 390
- ISBN: 0-345-45089-2

The Lake of Dead Languages is the 2002 mystery debut novel of writer Carol Goodman, who won the Hammett Prize for her 2004 book The Seduction of Water.

== Synopsis ==
Jane Hudson left the Heart Lake School for Girls after the mysterious suicide of her roommates. Now, 20 years later, she is returning as the new Latin teacher, only to experience an eerie repeat of those past incidents.

== Reception ==
The Lake of Dead Languages received mixed reviews. The Boston Globe called it "a gothic and elegant page turner, made more believable by Jane's even and balanced narration," and The Denver Post's reviewer called it "a book that needs the roar of a fire to ward off its psychic chill." On the other hand, Kirkus Reviews called it "a gothic, unconvincing debut replete with incest, homoeroticism, and murder," and "[t]rash, despite the highfalutin Latin and classic references—and not very sexy trash at that;" noting "the manufactured logic" of Jane's return to Heart Lake, given her history there.
