= Katherine Cowley =

American author

- Occupation: Author
- Writing career
- Genre: Historical mystery
- Website: www.katherinecowley.com

Katherine Cowley is an American author of historical mysteries, short stories, and essays. She is also a lecturer.

Cowley lives in Michigan and has taught writing at Western Michigan University.

== Writing awards ==
Cowley's debut novel, The Secret Life of Miss Mary Bennet, was a finalist for the 2022 Mystery Writers of America Mary Higgins Clark Award of the Edgar Awards. The novel was the winner of 2022 Latter-day Saints in Publishing, Media, and the Arts (LDSPMA) Praiseworthy Award in the Suspense/Mystery category. It was also the finalist for the Whitney Awards for Best Mystery/Suspense and Best Debut Novel.

Cowley's blog, Jane Austen Writing Lessons, was one of the "100 Best Websites for Writers in 2021" according to The Write Life.

In 2024, an essay Cowley published in the journal Irreantum was nominated for the Pushcart Prize.

== Selected works ==
=== Novels ===
- The Secret Life of Miss Mary Bennet, (Tule Publishing, 2021, ISBN 9781953647443)
- The True Confessions of a London Spy, (Tule Publishing, 2022, ISBN 9781956387230)
- The Lady's Guide to Death and Deception, (Tule Publishing, 2022, ISBN 9781957748566)

=== Nonfiction ===
- Write with Jane Austen: Masterclasses with the Master Storyteller, (Pointe Press, 2025, ISBN 979-8999313416)

=== Short publications (selection) ===
- "The Justified Fear of Snow in Jane Austen's Emma." Jane Austen's World. Essay. 2022.
- "Revising for Tone During Difficult Times." Women Writers, Women's Books. Essay. 2022.
- A Rising Generation: Women in Power in Young Adult novels (Dialogue: A Journal of Mormon Thought, 53, Spring 2020, p 194–198.)

=== Short stories (selection) ===
- "Tatterhood and the Prince’s Hand." Unspun: A Collection of Tattered Fairy Tales. Novella. (CreateSpace Independent Publishing, 2018, ISBN 9781986727877)
- "Confessions of a Mycologist." Mad Scientist Journal, Spring 2018, Volume CCI, Short story. (Mad Scientist Journal, 2018.)
- "The Last Bathroom." Defenestration. Short story. (Defenestration: A Literary Magazine Dedicated to Humor, 2016.)
- "The Clockwork Seer." Steel and Bone: Nine Steampunk Adventures. Novelette. (Xchyler Publishing, 2015, ISBN 9781940810409)
- The Cultural Repository. Defenestration. Short story. (Defenestration: A Literary Magazine Dedicated to Humor, 2022.)
