= Anne Perry =

English author (1938–2023)

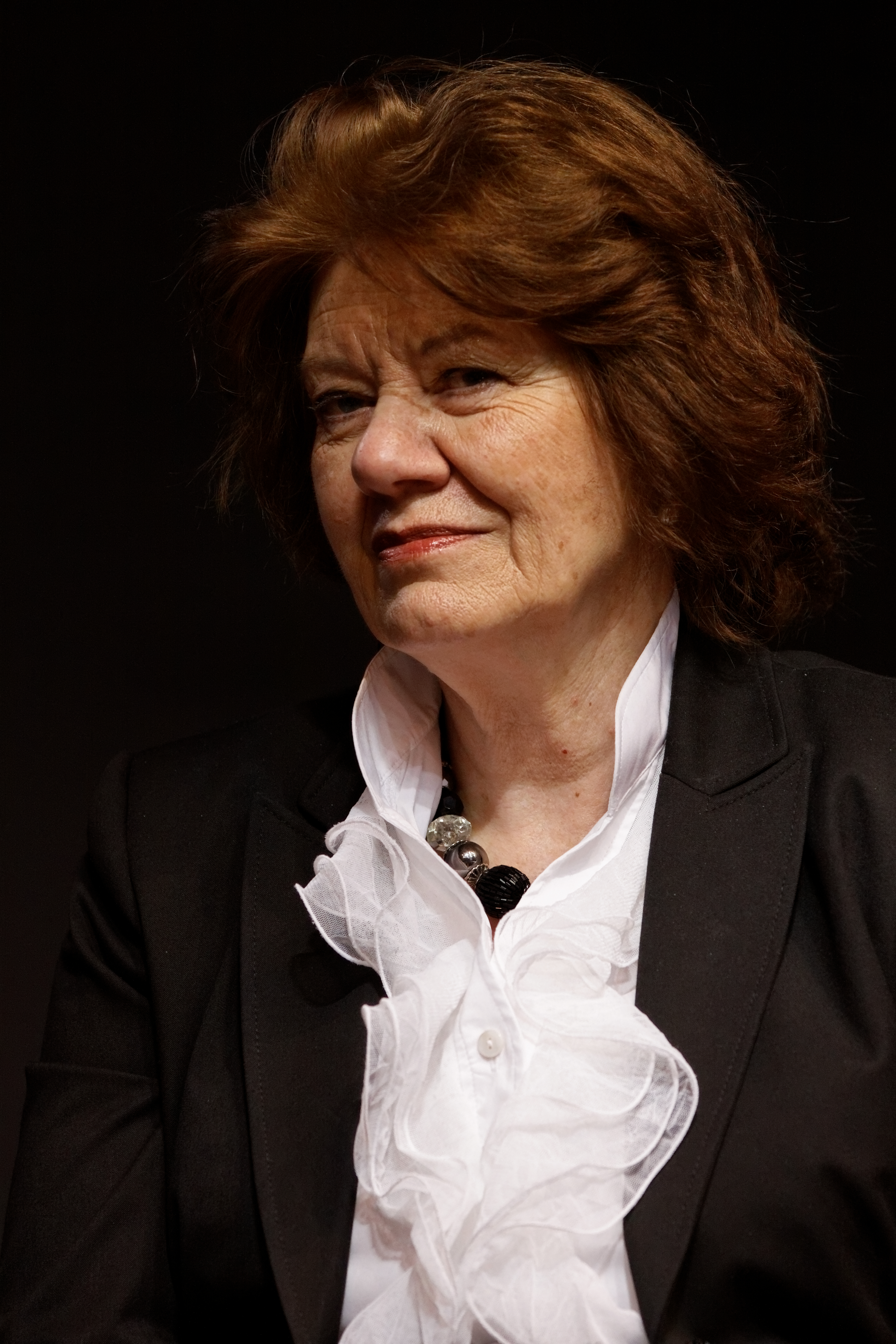
- Perry in 2012
- Born: Juliet Marion Hulme; 28 October 1938; London, England
- Died: 10 April 2023 (aged 84); Los Angeles, California, U.S.
- Occupation: Author
- Notable work: Thomas and Charlotte Pitt and William Monk novels
- Father: Henry Rainsford Hulme
- Website: anneperry.us

Anne Perry (born Juliet Marion Hulme; 28 October 1938 – 10 April 2023) was a British crime writer. She was the author of the Thomas and Charlotte Pitt and William Monk series of historical detective fiction.

In 1994, it became public knowledge that Perry had been convicted of murder in Christchurch, New Zealand, in 1954 when she was fifteen. She and her sixteen-year-old friend Pauline Parker murdered Parker's mother, Honorah. After serving a five-year sentence for the murder, Perry changed her name from Juliet Hulme and returned to the United Kingdom. She was identified by the media following the release of the film Heavenly Creatures, directed by Peter Jackson, which is based on the case.

== Early life ==
Juliet Marion Hulme was born on 28 October 1938 in London, the second child and first daughter of physicist Henry Rainsford Hulme. Hulme was diagnosed with tuberculosis as a child and sent to the Caribbean, South Africa, and New Zealand in hopes that a warmer climate would improve her health. She rejoined her family after her father took a position as rector of Canterbury University College in New Zealand. She attended Christchurch Girls' High School, located in what became the Cranmer Centre. A 1948 Auckland Star photograph of Hulme arriving in New Zealand was discovered by Auckland Libraries staff in 2012 and written about in the Heritage et AL blog.

== Murder and trial ==
In June 1954, at the age of 15, Hulme and her best friend Pauline Parker murdered Parker's mother, Honorah Rieper. Hulme's parents were in the process of separating and she was supposed to go to South Africa to stay with a relative. The two teenage friends, who had created a complicated fantasy life together populated with celebrities such as Mario Lanza and James Mason, did not want to be separated.

On 22 June 1954, the girls and Rieper went for a walk in Victoria Park in the Port Hills of Christchurch. On an isolated path, Hulme dropped an ornamental stone so that Rieper would lean over to retrieve it. Parker had planned to hit her mother with half a brick wrapped in a stocking. The girls presumed that one blow would kill her but it took more than 20.

Parker and Hulme stood trial in Christchurch in 1954 and were found guilty on 28 August. As they were too young to be considered for the death penalty under New Zealand law at the time, they were convicted and sentenced to be "detained at Her Majesty's pleasure". They were released separately five years later. At the time of Perry's death in 2023, Parker and Perry were not believed to have had any contact since the trial.

The events formed the basis for the 1994 film Heavenly Creatures, in which Melanie Lynskey portrayed a teenaged Pauline Parker and Kate Winslet played the teenaged Juliet Hulme. At the time of the film's release, it was not generally known that Anne Perry was Juliet Hulme; her identity was made public after journalists tracked her down some months after the film's release. Although some presumed Hulme and Parker's relationship to be sexual, Perry stated in 2006 that, while the relationship was obsessive, the two "were never lesbians".

== Later life ==
After being released from prison in November 1959, Perry returned to England and became a flight attendant. For a period she lived in the United States, where she joined the Church of Jesus Christ of Latter-day Saints in 1968. She later settled in the Scottish village of Portmahomack, where she lived with her mother. Her father had a distinguished scientific career, heading the British hydrogen bomb programme.

Hulme took the name Anne Perry, using her stepfather's surname. Her first novel, The Cater Street Hangman, was published under this name in 1979. Her works generally fall into one of several categories of genre fiction, including historical murder mysteries and detective fiction. Many feature recurring characters, most importantly Thomas and Charlotte Pitt, who appeared in her first novel, and amnesiac private investigator William Monk, who first appeared in her 1990 novel The Face of a Stranger.

After Perry's identity as Hulme was revealed in 1994, she said:

It seemed so unfair. Everything I had worked to achieve as a decent member of society was threatened. And once again my life was being interpreted by someone else. It had happened in court when, as a minor, I wasn't allowed to speak and I heard all these lies being told. And now there was a film, but nobody had bothered to talk to me. I knew nothing about it until the day before release. All I could think of was that my life would fall apart and that it might kill my mother.

She continued writing and said that she was surprised that her friends stuck by her despite the revelation of her identity and the ensuing media attention. In 1998 she was featured by The Times in its list of 100 "masters of crime". Her story "Heroes", which first appeared in the 1999 anthology Murder and Obsession, edited by Otto Penzler, won the 2000 Edgar Award for Best Short Story.

In 2005, Perry appeared on the Trisha show to discuss her murder conviction on a special themed show. A 2009 documentary film, Anne Perry Interiors, gave a snapshot of her life and the people close to her. In 2009 she received a lifetime achievement award at the Agatha Awards. In 2013 and 2020 she was a guest of honour at the Bouchercon mystery fiction convention. At the time of her death in 2023, Perry had published 102 books: 32 novels in the Charlotte and Thomas Pitt series, 6 novels in the Daniel Pitt series, 24 novels in the Monk series, five books in her WWI series, five books in her Elena Standish series, four young adult novels, two fantasy novels, and 22 mystery novellas with Christmas themes, as well as a number of essays and short stories. Her UK publisher, Headline, reported that she had sold 25 million copies. Her works regularly appeared on The New York Times bestseller list.

In 2017, Perry left Scotland and moved to the US in order to more effectively promote films based on her novels. She had a heart attack in December 2022, and died at a hospital in Los Angeles on 10 April 2023, aged 84. Her novel The Fourth Enemy, the sixth Daniel Pitt novel, was published the day after her death.

== Bibliography ==
Each series is listed in internal chronological order, according to the author's website.

Perry's two main series each feature a male and a female protagonist. Thomas Pitt is matched with his wife Charlotte, while William Monk is matched with Hester Latterly, a Crimean War nurse. The Monk mysteries are set earlier in the Victorian era (1850s–1860s) than the Pitt books (1880s–1890s).

=== Featuring Thomas and Charlotte Pitt ===
1. The Cater Street Hangman (1979)
2. Callander Square (1980)
3. Paragon Walk (1981)
4. Resurrection Row (1981)
5. Rutland Place (1983)
6. Bluegate Fields (1984)
7. Death in the Devil's Acre (1985)
8. Cardington Crescent (1987)
9. Silence in Hanover Close (1988)
10. Bethlehem Road (1990)
11. Highgate Rise (1991)
12. Belgrave Square (1992)
13. Farrier's Lane (1993)
14. The Hyde Park Headsman (1994)
15. Traitors Gate (1995)
16. Pentecost Alley (1996)
17. Ashworth Hall (1997)
18. Brunswick Gardens (1998)
19. Bedford Square (1999)
20. Half Moon Street (2000)
21. The Whitechapel Conspiracy (2001)
22. Southampton Row (2002)
23. Seven Dials (2003)
24. Long Spoon Lane (2005)
25. Buckingham Palace Gardens (2008)
26. Betrayal at Lisson Grove (US title: Treason at Lisson Grove) (2011)
27. Dorchester Terrace (2012)
28. Midnight at Marble Arch (2013)
29. Death on Blackheath (2014)
30. The Angel Court Affair (2015)
31. Treachery at Lancaster Gate (2016)
32. Murder on the Serpentine (2017)

=== Featuring Daniel Pitt ===
1. Twenty-One Days (2018)
2. Triple Jeopardy (2019)
3. One Fatal Flaw (2020)
4. Death with a Double Edge (2021)
5. Three Debts Paid (2022)
6. The Fourth Enemy (2023)

=== Featuring Hester Latterly and William Monk ===
1. The Face of a Stranger (1990)
2. A Dangerous Mourning (1991)
3. Defend and Betray (1992)
4. A Sudden, Fearful Death (1993)
5. The Sins of the Wolf (1994)
6. Cain His Brother (1995)
7. Weighed in the Balance (1996)
8. The Silent Cry (1997)
9. A Breach of Promise (alt. title: Whited Sepulchres) (1997)
10. The Twisted Root (1999)
11. Slaves of Obsession (alt. title: Slaves and Obsession) (2000)
12. A Funeral in Blue (2001)
13. Death of a Stranger (2002)
14. The Shifting Tide (2004)
15. Dark Assassin (2006)
16. Execution Dock (2009)
17. Acceptable Loss (2011)
18. A Sunless Sea (2012)
19. Blind Justice (2013)
20. Blood on the Water (2014)
21. Corridors of the Night (2015)
22. Revenge in a Cold River (2016)
23. An Echo of Murder (2017)
24. Dark Tide Rising (2018)

==== William Monk ====
Inspector William Monk is a fictional character created by Perry and hero of a series of books introduced in 1990.

Monk was born in Northumberland shortly before the accession of Queen Victoria, the son of a fisherman. Before he joined the police, Monk worked as a banker under Arroll Dundas, who became Monk's mentor and taught him how to behave and dress like a gentleman. When Dundas was wrongly convicted of railway fraud, Monk decided he would never again be so powerless against injustice and became a policeman. He was ruthlessly ambitious and quickly climbed the career ladder—while making many enemies along the way. He had a coach accident in 1856, after which he lost his memory—a fact he kept secret to save his job. After the accident he met Hester Latterly, a Crimean War nurse and they became close. Only Latterly knew about Monk's memory issues. In the second book, A Dangerous Mourning, Monk was fired from the police force for insubordination and became a private investigator. Lady Callandra Daviott (Hester's best friend) financed his private investigations. Sir Oliver Rathbone was his love rival (he too wanted to marry Hester) and judicial adviser in his case. In Dark Assassin, Monk joined the Thames River Police to pay a debt to a friend who died on a previous case. Although he finds the shift from street policing to river policing difficult, he earns the respect of his men and continues on in this position. While Monk lives in the Victorian era, his disregard for social conventions (openly suspecting the gentry instead of the servants in A Dangerous Mourning, and consistently ignoring class distinctions) imbues him with the power of a true believer and gives him access to multiple layers of society, which aids his tireless efforts.

=== Featuring Elena Standish ===
1. Death in Focus (2019)
2. A Question of Betrayal (2020)
3. A Darker Reality (2021)
4. A Truth To Lie For (2022)
5. The Traitor Among Us (2023)

=== The World War I series ===
1. No Graves As Yet (2003)
2. Shoulder the Sky (2004)
3. Angels in the Gloom (2005)
4. At Some Disputed Barricade (2006)
5. We Shall Not Sleep (2007)

=== The Christmas stories ===
1. A Christmas Journey (2003)
2. A Christmas Visitor (2004)
3. A Christmas Guest (2005)
4. A Christmas Secret (2006)
5. A Christmas Beginning (2007)
6. A Christmas Grace (2008)
7. A Christmas Promise (2009)
8. A Christmas Odyssey (2010)
9. A Christmas Homecoming (2011)
10. A Christmas Garland (2012)
11. A Christmas Hope (2013)
12. A New York Christmas (2014)
13. A Christmas Escape (2015)
14. A Christmas Message (2016)
15. A Christmas Return (2017)
16. A Christmas Revelation (2018)
17. A Christmas Gathering (2019)
18. A Christmas Resolution (2020)
19. A Christmas Legacy (2021)
20. A Christmas Deliverance (2022)
21. A Christmas Vanishing (2023)

=== The Christmas Collections ===
1. An Anne Perry Christmas: Two Holiday Novels (2006) – contains A Christmas Journey (2003) and A Christmas Visitor (2004)
2. Anne Perry's Christmas Mysteries: Two Holiday Novels (2008) – contains A Christmas Guest (2005) and A Christmas Secret (2006)
3. Anne Perry's Silent Nights: Two Victorian Christmas Mysteries (2009) – contains A Christmas Beginning (2007) and A Christmas Grace (2008)
4. Anne Perry's Christmas Vigil: Two Victorian Holiday Mysteries (2011) – contains A Christmas Promise (2009) and A Christmas Odyssey (2010)
5. Anne Perry's Christmas Crimes: Two Victorian Holiday Mysteries (2014) – contains A Christmas Homecoming (2011) and A Christmas Garland (2012)
6. Anne Perry's Merry Mysteries: Two Victorian Holiday Novels (2015) – contains A Christmas Hope (2013) and A New York Christmas (2014)

=== Fantasy ===
1. Tathea (2000)
2. Come Armageddon (2002)

=== Timepiece series (young adult novels) ===
1. Tudor Rose (2011)
2. Rose of No Man's Land (2011)
3. Blood Red Rose (2012)
4. Rose Between Two Thorns (2012)

=== Other books ===
- The One Thing More (2000)
- A Dish Taken Cold (2001)
- I'd Kill For That (2004, one novel co-written by multiple authors)
- Letters From The Highlands (2004)
- Heroes (2011)
- The Sheen on the Silk: A Novel (2010)
- The Scroll (2014)

=== Short stories in anthologies ===
- Death by Horoscope (2001, anthology of short stories by various authors, including Perry, and edited by Perry)
- Much Ado About Murder (2002, anthology of short stories by various authors, including Perry, and edited by Perry)
- Death By Dickens (2004, anthology of short stories by various authors, including Perry, and edited by Perry)
- Thou Shalt Not Kill: Biblical Mystery Stories (2005, anthology of short stories by various authors, including Perry, and edited by Perry)

=== Critical studies, reviews and biography ===
- Drayton J. (2012) The Search for Anne Perry, HarperCollins.
- Graham P. (2011).So Brilliantly Clever: Parker, Hulme and the murder that shocked the world. Awa Press.; re-issued in 2013 as Graham P. (2013) Anne Perry and the murder of the century. Skyhorse Publications
- West, Michelle (June 2000). "[Review of 'Tathea']". Musing on Books. F&SF. 98 (6): 41–46. Archived from the original on 27 December 2004.

== See also ==
- LDS fiction
