= An Impartial Witness =

2010 historical mystery novel by Charles Todd

- Author: Charles Todd
- Series: Bess Crawford Mysteries
- Genre: Historical mystery
- Publisher: William Morrow
- Publication date: 2010
- ISBN: 978-0-06-179179-6
- Preceded by: A Duty to the Dead
- Followed by: A Bitter Truth

An Impartial Witness is the second in the Bess Crawford series of historical mystery novels by American writers Caroline and Charles Todd, writing under the pseudonym Charles Todd. The series, set in and after World War I, features the British army nurse Bess Crawford. An Impartial Witness was published by William Morrow, an imprint of HarperCollins, in 2010.

== Plot ==
Bess Crawford, a British army nurse serving on the Western Front in 1917, has had an injured British aviator under her care for three months. Despite his disfiguring injuries, the pilot, Meriwether Evanson, has found the courage to go on from a miniature photograph of his new bride, Marjorie, that he keeps pinned to his lapel. When Evanson and many other wounded are transported back to England, Crawford is assigned to accompany them. After the transfer is complete, Crawford takes a train back to London, and happens to see Meriwether's wife Marjorie on the train platform — Crawford recognizes her from Meriwether's miniature photograph. The woman is having some sort of desperate conversation with an officer, who coldly leaves her in tears as he boards the train. Before Crawford can act, the weeping Marjorie runs out of the station and is lost in the crowd.

Two weeks later, back in France, Crawford reads in a newspaper that Marjorie was stabbed and thrown in the Thames only hours after Crawford saw her in the train station. The police are appealing for more information, so Crawford writes a letter to Scotland Yard describing what she had seen. She is quickly summoned to London for an interview, and finds out that Marjorie had been three months pregnant. Since Marjorie's husband Meriwether had been in hospital for three months, it was clear that he could not be the father. Despite the immediate conclusion that the officer on the train platform was Marjorie's lover, Crawford is unsure, since the man had appeared so cold. Crawford also learns that Meriwether, after learning of his wife's murder, committed suicide.

On her next leave, Crawford is invited by a friend to attend a weekend get-together being organized by Meriwether's sister Serena Melton. Crawford meets several people, including Serena and her husband Jack, as well as Marjorie's sister, the spiteful Victoria, who apparently in the past would stop at nothing to destroy Marjorie's life. Crawford also meets the handsome Michael Hart, who had been in love with Marjorie, but denies sleeping with her.

Crawford also meets a friend of Marjorie's, Helen Calder, who shares some photographs her brother had taken in France. In one of them, Crawford recognizes the officer she saw on the platform, who turns out to be Raymond Melton, brother of Jack. Shortly afterward, Helen Calder is stabbed, and although she lives, in her delirium, she calls out the name of Michael Hart, who admits he had gone to see her. Michael is charged both for attempting to murder Helen, as well for the murder of Serena. He pleads guilty to both charges, and is sentenced to hang. Crawford knows he is not guilty, and is only doing this to protect Serena's reputation, since her illicit pregnancy would come up during a trial.

Crawford discovers that Marjorie and Victoria's father had spitefully left a provision in his will that his house would go to either Serena or Victoria, whoever was the first to have a child. This gives Victoria motive for killing her pregnant sister. But Crawford also speculates that although Raymond Melton displayed no signs of affection at the train station, what if Marjorie had had an affair with her brother-in-law Jack, and Raymond was merely acting as a go-between, telling Marjorie at the train station that Jack wanted nothing further to do with her. What if Raymond had phoned Jack at the next station and told him Marjorie had threatened to reveal the affair? Would Jack have sought out Marjorie and stabbed her?

In Crawford's eyes, both Victoria and Jack have excellent motives, and she keeps on digging, trying to save Michael Hart's life as the day of his hanging draws closer. The killer, worried that Crawford was getting too close to the truth, attempts to kill Crawford at her flat. She is saved by her lifelong friend Simon Brandon, who subdues the killer. Once the police arrive, the killer is arrested and Michael Hart is released.

== Publication history ==
Following the success of their first mystery series revolving around Inspector Ian Rutledge, the writing duo of Caroline and Charles Todd decided to start another series, this one about war nurse Bess Crawford, who, before World War I, had circulated in the same upper class social circles as Ian Rutledge. The result was A Duty to the Dead, published by William Morrow, an imprint of HarperCollins, in 2009. The second in the series, An Impartial Witness, was published the following year. Charles Todd would go on to write twelve more titles in the Bess Crawford series.

== Reception ==
Publishers Weekly noted "In addition to supplying a challenging puzzle, Todd (a mother-son writing team) does a superb job of capturing the feel of the battlefield and the emotional toll taken on those waiting back home for a loved one's return."

Kirkus Reviews was disappointed, commenting "Bess is dogged, implacable and headstrong in the way of Victorian heroines, and mired in a plot the author's more capable detective, Ian Rutledge, would dispatch in half the time with twice the brio."

Writing for Library Journal, Susan Moritz commented, "Readers will enjoy Todd's plucky, determined sleuth and a thrilling mystery that proves murders on the home front don't stop just because there's a war. Recommended for historical mystery enthusiasts who like intrepid heroine investigators similar to Maisie Dobbs"

Ellen Keith, writing for the Historical Novel Society, noted, "Todd's mysteries are far from British cozies. Bess sees death in her field hospital in France, and home in England, on precious leave, she sacrifices time with her family to prevent an innocent man from being unjustly hung. What I appreciate about the Rutledge mysteries holds equally true in this new series — war touches everyone, not just those serving at the front. By the same token, Bess's investigations reveal that life goes on during wartime; jealousies and fears still exist, and shared sacrifices do not confer sainthood."
