= The Other Woman (Ryan novel) =

2012 novel by Hank Phillippi Ryan

- First edition
- Author: Hank Phillippi Ryan
- Genre: Fiction, Thriller, Suspense, Crime, Mystery
- Published: 2012
- Publisher: Forge Books
- Pages: 416
- Awards: Mary Higgins Clark Award (2013)
- ISBN: 978-0-765-33257-8
- Website: The Other Woman

The Other Woman is a novel by Hank Phillippi Ryan and was originally published by Forge Books on 4 September 2012 which then went on to win the Mary Higgins Clark Award in 2013.

In 2012, the book was also nominated to receive the Agatha Award, subsequently the Anthony Award in 2013.
