= The Sleeping Dictionary (novel) =

Novel by Sujata Massey

First edition (publ. Gallery Books)

The Sleeping Dictionary (released by PenguinIndia with the title The City of Palaces) is a novel by American writer Sujata Massey. It is the first book in the Daughters of Bengal series and was released in paperback on August 20, 2013. Set in late Raj India, The Sleeping Dictionary tells the story of a young peasant girl, who makes her way to Calcutta and is caught between the raging independence movement and the British colonial society she finds herself inhabiting.

== Plot ==
Set between 1925 and the end of World War II, The Sleeping Dictionary is the story of Kamala, who loses her family during a West Bengal cyclone. As the young orphan, an unseen child servant, grows up and learns English, she turns into a secret freedom fighter in Calcutta. While the term "sleeping dictionary" was originally coined for young women who slept with Europeans and educated them in the ways of India, Kamala turns the tables on the colonial establishment, using her talents for readings languages and men to work for India's independence. This is an unusual portrait of colonial India, told in the voice of a young woman who breaks barriers of race and caste to remake her destiny.

== Reception ==
The book received a favorable review in the Romantic Times.
