= Thomas Pitt (character) =

- First appearance: The Cater Street Hangman
- Created by: Anne Perry
- Portrayed by: Eoin McCarthy

In-universe information
- Gender: Male
- Occupation: Police detective
- Spouse: Charlotte Pitt (née Ellison)
- Nationality: British

Thomas Pitt is the protagonist in a series of detective novels by Anne Perry in the first of which he meets his future wife, Charlotte Ellison. They are both involved in the investigation and solving of cases in the series.

== Life story ==
Pitt is from a working-class background in Victorian London. His father was a gamekeeper on a landed estate and Pitt was educated alongside the son of the house. He was prompted to enter the police force after his father was wrongly accused of poaching game and transported to Australia.

At the beginning of the series, Pitt is a police inspector, but he was eventually promoted to superintendent. Later he is removed from his job as a result of investigating the "wrong people", i.e. those with sufficient influence and power, and joins the Special Branch, in which he becomes an inspector. Later he is promoted to commander as Head of Special Branch.

== Charlotte Pitt and her investigations ==
His wife, Charlotte (née Ellison), is from an upper-class family. Her sister Emily's first husband was a viscount and Emily's second husband is a rising politician. Charlotte frequently uses Emily's connections to the landed gentry and aristocracy to assist Pitt in his investigations. Charlotte relies on her maid, Gracie, to take care for her children, Jemima and Daniel, when she is investigating a mystery. Charlotte's well-intentioned interference in her husband's investigations gives Pitt access to information which enables him to solve the case. Vespasia Cumming-Gould, the elderly aunt of Emily's first husband, becomes a friend to both Emily and Charlotte and eases their way into society.

== Television adaptation ==
The first novel, The Cater Street Hangman, was adapted for TV in 1998; it starred Eoin McCarthy as Pitt and Keeley Hawes as Charlotte and featured Hannah Spearritt in her acting debut.

== Novels ==
Series is listed in internal chronological order.

1. The Cater Street Hangman (1979)
2. Callander Square (1980)
3. Paragon Walk (1981)
4. Resurrection Row (1981)
5. Rutland Place (1983)
6. Bluegate Fields (1984)
7. Death in the Devil's Acre (1985)
8. Cardington Crescent (1987)
9. Silence in Hanover Close (1988)
10. Bethlehem Road (1990)
11. Highgate Rise (1991)
12. Belgrave Square (1992)
13. Farrier's Lane (1993)
14. The Hyde Park Headsman (1994)
15. Traitors Gate (1995)
16. Pentecost Alley (1996)
17. Ashworth Hall (1997)
18. Brunswick Gardens (1998)
19. Bedford Square (1999)
20. Half Moon Street (1998)
21. The Whitechapel Conspiracy (2001)
22. Southampton Row (2002)
23. Seven Dials (2003)
24. Long Spoon Lane (2005)
25. Buckingham Palace Gardens (2008)
26. Betrayal at Lisson Grove (US title: Treason at Lisson Grove) (2011)
27. Dorchester Terrace (2012)
28. Midnight at Marble Arch (2013)
29. Death on Blackheath (2014)
30. The Angel Court Affair (2015)
31. Treachery at Lancaster Gate (2016)
32. Murder on the Serpentine (2016)

A new series features Daniel Pitt, son of Thomas and Charlotte.

1. Twenty-One Days (2018)
2. Triple Jeopardy (2019)
3. One Fatal Flaw (2020)
4. Death with a Double Edge (2021)
5. Three Debts Paid (2022)
6. The Fourth Enemy (2023)

Publishing dates obtained from author's website.
