= The Cater Street Hangman =

Book by Anne Perry

- First US edition
- Author: Anne Perry
- Language: English
- Series: Inspector Pitt Mysteries
- Genre: Crime fiction
- Publisher: Robert Hale (UK); St. Martin's Press (US)
- Publication date: 1979
- Publication place: United Kingdom
- Media type: Print (hardback & paperback)
- Pages: 247 (First Edition, Hardcover)
- ISBN: 0-345-51356-8
- OCLC: 232980345
- Followed by: Callander Square

The Cater Street Hangman is a crime novel by Anne Perry. It is the first in a series which features the husband-and-wife team of Thomas and Charlotte Pitt.

== Plot introduction ==
The Cater Street Hangman introduces Inspector Thomas Pitt and Charlotte Ellison, who both become regular characters in crime novels by Anne Perry. Set in 1881, the story follows an investigation into the murders of several young women in the streets near the wealthy Ellison family home.

=== Explanation of the novel's title ===
Throughout the Thomas Pitt series, Perry uses the names of real neighbourhoods in London as titles of the novels.

== Plot summary ==
In an upper-class salon on Cater Street, several women discuss, in oblique terms, the death of a local girl. Even though Susannah has recently been out of town and is unaware of the murder, it is bad form for proper women to talk about such matters and so they are careful not to say anything too direct about the way the daughter of a friend was garroted and cut open. Finally, tiring of the game, Charlotte comes out and tells her aunt what she has heard about the murder. Although the victim was of the upper class she quickly gains a reputation as having been a bad seed.

A second death occurs, this time a servant. Again the idea that these women did something to deserve this end is easier to accept than the knowledge that it could happen to anyone else. Only when the third murder happens to a member of the Ellison household do they believe that these crimes might not be a simple case of robbery or jealousy. A young police inspector, Thomas Pitt, has been investigating these crimes and soon arrives to question the Ellison household.

Pitt is the educated son of a gamekeeper and cook. His education and manners let him wander in upper-class circles, while his dress and impolite tactics keep them from becoming entirely comfortable with him. Although Pitt aspires to higher social standing, he requests that he be treated as a middle class working man. None of this endears the inspector to Caroline Ellison, the lady of the house and mother of Sarah, Emily and Charlotte Ellison.

Pitt uses pointed questions and little tact to find the information he needs. He often knows the answers to questions before he speaks and so puts everyone off-guard as they attempt to keep their secrets hidden. Before long, every female suspects every male of being the hangman, much to the detriment of long-standing marriages and relationships.

As the investigation into who is killing the young women progresses, Thomas falls in love with the unconventional Charlotte. Outwardly, Charlotte is a model of Victorian society, but she does not wish to become one of the mindless women she sees every day. Instead, she reads newspapers that are smuggled out of her father's sight and speaks her mind on all manner of subjects. She finds out more about the world beyond her door when she meets Thomas and finds that he will engage her in useful and interesting discussions.

Anne Perry wrote The Cater Street Hangman as a single, stand alone, novel. She had not intended for it to become a series and so there are elements in this book which do not blend smoothly into the series.

== Characters ==
- Edward Ellison – Banker. Father of Sarah, Emily and Charlotte. Very upright.
- Caroline Ellison – Mother of Sarah, Emily and Charlotte. Respectable and intelligent.
- Sarah Corde – Fair and delicate as well as very proper. Married to Dominic.
- Charlotte Ellison – Curious and rebellious, but within the acceptable confines of Victorian society.
- Emily Ellison – Flirtatious and shrewd.
- Grandmamma – Edward's mother. She also lived in the Ellison household. Bitter and righteous old woman.
- Dominic Corde – Married to Sarah. Easy-going manner and very handsome. He lives in the Ellison household with his wife.
- Susannah – Edward's sister, younger by nineteen years. She was married at age twenty-one but widowed a year later in the Hyde Park Riots. She lives comfortably on her own.
- Mrs. Dunphy – Cook to the Ellisons.
- Dora – Kitchen maid to the Ellisons.
- Maddock – Butler to the Ellisons.
- Lily Mitchell – House maid to the Ellisons.
- Jenks – Driver for the Ellisons.
- Detective Inspector Thomas Pitt – Strong-willed and focused.
- Lord George Ashworth – Courting Emily. He has a reputation for being less than honourable.
- Vicar Prebble – Spiritual advisor to the area. He is too righteous and strict to be pleasant company.
- Martha Prebble – Hard-working wife to the Vicar. She is quiet and under-appreciated by her husband. Ellisons feel pity for her.
- Mrs. Winchester – Busybody gossip who Caroline entertains.
- Mrs. Abernathy – Mother to first victim.
- Chloe Abernathy – First victim. Upper-class, flighty but with a good heart.
- Mrs. Selby – Friend to Grandmamma, with an excellent memory.
- Lucy Sandelson – Friend to Emily.
- Misses Madison – Sisters and friends to Emily. The vicar finds them sinful because they wear lipstick and tempt men.
- Hayward sisters – Friends to Emily.
- Colonel Decker – Host for a high-society ball which Lord Ashworth and Emily attend.
- Mr. Lambling – Friend to Lord Ashworth, courting Miss Decker.
- Lady Eugenia Carson – Lord Ashworth's sister.
- Daisy – Servant to Mrs. Waterman.
- Jack Brody – Clerk. Dating Lily.
- Mrs. Harding – Gossip with colourful memories.
- Sergeant Flack – Inspector Pitt's assistant in the investigation.
- Hetty Gosfield – Admires Lord Ashworth, Emily sees her as a rival.
- Mr. and Mrs. Lessing – Sexton and his wife. Friends to Sarah and Dominic.
- Millie Simpkins – New maid in Ellison household.
- Mrs. Attwood – An old friend of Edward.
- Alan Cuthbertson – Business associate of Edward.
- Verity Lessing – Sexton's daughter.
- Bessie Mullane – Runs a house of ill-repute.
- Willie – A nose for the crushers (a police informant)
- William – A resurrectionist (steals corpses for medical schools)
- Belle – A prostitute

== Literary significance and reception ==
Anne Perry's first published novel was well received in the United States for its historically accurate setting, focus on social issues and its intricate character relationships. Enthusiastic reviews helped spread her readership, but it wasn't until many years later that she gained fame in her home country of England.

"An ingenious mystery and an excellent example of manners and caste systems of the Victorian era." The Chattanooga Times

=== References to other works ===
- When her mother catches Charlotte reading a newspaper she suggests that the new work by Charles Dickens or Coningsby by Benjamin Disraeli would be more acceptable reading material.

=== References to actual history, geography and current science ===
- The book opens upon Charlotte reading a purloined newspaper. She learns that Benjamin Disraeli, 1st Earl of Beaconsfield has recently died. Her first thought is to the reaction of his rival, William Ewart Gladstone.
- Unacceptable topics of conversation for proper women include the Zulu War, violent crimes, and sex in any context.
- Charlotte and Thomas discuss many criminal elements that Thomas has dealt with, including gangs of child thieves and the sale of corpses to medical schools by grave robbers.

== Adaptation ==
In 1998 Ardent Productions produced a made-for-television film version of the book in association with Yorkshire Television. It was broadcast on ITV in Britain on 23 September 1998, and on A&E in the United States. The film departed slightly from the novel, dwelling less on seamy motives, and having a slightly different ending.

== Publication history ==
- 1979, England, Robert Hale, Hardcover
