= Learning to Swim =

Crime novel by Sara J. Henry

- Author: Sara J. Henry
- Genre: Mystery, Fiction, Thriller
- Published: 2011
- Publisher: Crown Publishing Group
- Pages: 304
- Awards: Mary Higgins Clark Award (2012)
- ISBN: 978-0-307-71838-9
- Website: Learning to Swim

Learning to Swim is a book written by Sara J. Henry and published by Crown Publishing Group on February 22, 2011. It went on to win the Mary Higgins Clark Award in 2012, the Agatha Award for best first novel, and the Anthony Award for best first novel.
