= Sujata Massey =

American novelist

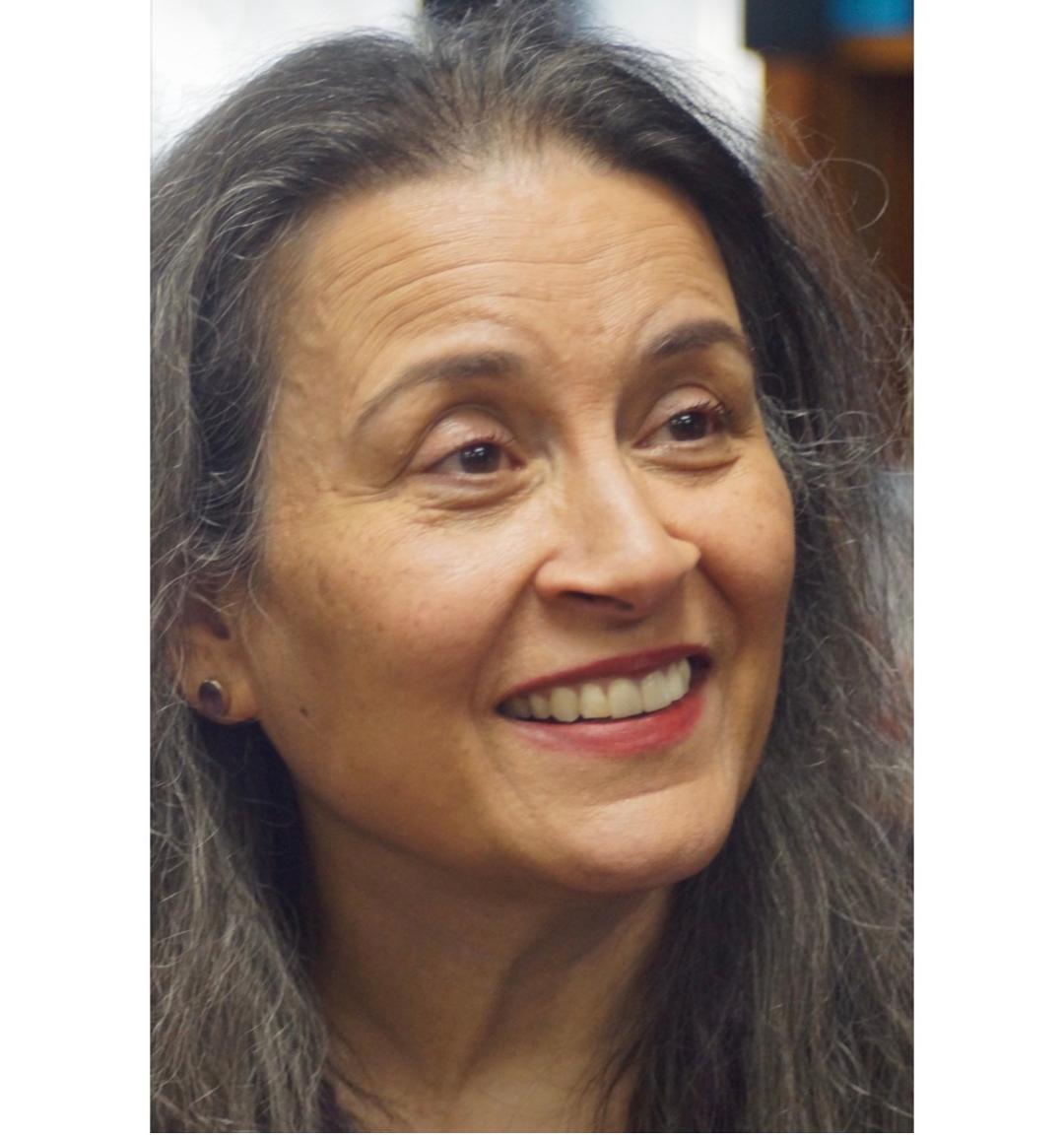
- Massey in 2026
- Born: Sujata Banerjee; March 4, 1964 (age 62); Sussex, England, United Kingdom
- Education: Johns Hopkins University (BA)
- Occupation: Writer
- Writing career
- Genre: Mystery
- Website: sujatamassey.com

Sujata Massey (born Sujata Banerjee; March 4, 1964) is an American mystery author and historical fiction novelist. Her books are published in English in the US and Canada, the United Kingdom and India, and Australia/New Zealand. Massey’s novels are also available in different languages and formats in Estonia, Finland, France, Germany, Italy, Japan, Korea, the Netherlands, Norway, Poland, Russia, Spain and Thailand.

The author’s debut novel, The Salaryman’s Wife, won the Agatha Award for Best First Novel in 1997. In 2000, her novel The Flower Master won the Macavity Award for Best Mystery Novel. In 2019, her first Perveen Mistry novel, The Widows of Malabar Hill, won the Mary Higgins Clark Award, as well the Left Coast Crime Convention’s Bruce Alexander Memorial Award for Best Historical Mystery, the Macavity's Sue Feder Memorial Award for Best Historical Mystery, and the Agatha Award for Best Historical Novel. It was selected as Publishers Weekly's Best Mysteries and Thrillers of 2018 and was also an Amazon Best Book of 2018.

In 2020, The Widows of Malabar Hill was optioned for development as a television series by the Village Road Show Entertainment Group.

The second Perveen Mistry novel, The Satapur Moonstone, won a Bruce Alexander Memorial Award and was also a finalist for both the Sue Grafton Memorial Award and the Harper Lee Legal Fiction Prize.

== Life and career ==
Massey was born in 1964 in Sussex, England to a father from India, Subir Kumar Banerjee, and mother, Karin, from Germany. She emigrated with her family to the United States at the age of five and grew up in St. Paul Minnesota. At 18, she moved to Baltimore, Maryland, where she studied at Johns Hopkins University, graduating with a bachelor’s degree in the Writing Seminars in 1986. She next worked at the Baltimore Evening Sun newspaper, leaving the paper in 1991 to move to Japan for two years. In Japan, she worked as an English teacher and studied Japanese, flower arranging, and cooking.

Ms. Massey returned to the United States in 1993 and began a new career in 1997, when her first book, The Salaryman’s Wife, was published by HarperCollins US. This series of 11 books features a biracial heroine, Rei Shimura, and deals with social issues and the rich artistic heritage of Japan. The most recent Rei Shimura novel is The Kizuna Coast, set in tsunami-ravaged Tohoku.

In the late 1990s through 2020, Massey traveled frequently to India and became intrigued with the history of Indian women in late British colonial India. In 2013, she released a standalone mystery novel titled The Sleeping Dictionary set in British India between 1930 and 1947. In this novel, a 10-year-old peasant girl, Pom, orphaned by a cyclone, undertakes an odyssey through colonial Bengal that leads her into an adult life as a freedom fighter. In India, the same book is titled City of Palaces.

Massey continues to explore early 20th century India with her best-known work, a legal mystery series set in 1920s Bombay. It starts with a first novel, The Widows of Malabar Hill, that centers on a young female Parsi woman lawyer who battles discrimination in her own career and in the lives of women and children she assists. The book’s protagonist, Perveen Mistry, was partially inspired by India’s first two trailblazing women lawyers, the solicitor Cornelia Sorabji and the barrister Mithan Jamshed Lam.

In the second book, The Satapur Moonstone, Perveen solves a mystery in the fictional princely state of Satapur. The third book, The Bombay Prince, which was published in June 2021, has Perveen investigating the death of a young Indian woman during the Prince of Wales riots that occurred in Bombay in November 1921. A prequel novella featuring Perveen Mistry is entitled "Outnumbered at Oxford” and presents a short mystery that occurs during her student years in England.

== Works ==
=== The Perveen Mistry Investigations ===
- The Widows of Malabar Hill (Soho Crime, January 2018) ISBN 9781616957780, OCLC 983148226 (released under the title Murder on Malabar Hill in India, and as A Murder at Malabar Hill in Australia/New Zealand)
- The Satapur Moonstone (Soho Crime, May 2019) ISBN 9781616959098
- The Bombay Prince (Soho Crime, June 2021) ISBN 9781641291057
- The Mistress of Bhatia House (Soho Crime, July 2023) ISBN 9781641293297
- The Star from Calcutta (Soho Crime, May 2025) ISBN 978-1641295109

Short fiction featuring Perveen Mistry

- "Hairpin Holiday” (short story) The Usual Santas, Soho Crime, 2017
- "Outnumbered at Oxford” (novella) India Gray Historical Fiction, Ikat Press, 2015

The Perveen Mistry novels were published in audio by Recorded Books for distribution in the United States and Canada, and published by other companies as audiobooks in India, France and Finland.

=== The Rei Shimura Novels ===
- The Salaryman's Wife (1997)
- Zen Attitude (1998)
- The Flower Master (1999)
- The Floating Girl (2000)
- The Bride's Kimono (2001)
- The Samurai's Daughter (2003)
- The Pearl Diver (2004)
- The Typhoon Lover (2005). New York: Harper. ISBN 9780060765125.
- Girl in a Box (2006)
- Shimura Trouble London: Severn House, (2008). ISBN 9781847510549.
- The Kizuna Coast (December 2014)

Short fiction Featuring Rei Shimura

- "Junior High Samurai", Malice Domestic 10, Avon, 2001
- "The Convenience Boy", Tart Noir, Pan MacMillan 2002
- "The Deepest Blue", Murder Most Crafty, Berkeley Prime Crime 2005

The Salaryman’s Wife, Zen Attitude and The Flower Master were published as audiobooks by Tantor Media for distribution in the United States and Canada.

=== Stand Alone Books ===
- The Sleeping Dictionary (Simon & Schuster, August 2013) (Released by PenguinIndia with the title The City of Palaces. The Sleeping Dictionary audiobook was produced by Dreamscape Media.)

=== Short fiction ===
- "Goodwood Gardens", Baltimore Noir, Akashic Books, 2006
- "The Mayor’s Movie", Politics Noir, Verso Books, 2008
- "India Gray", "Bitter Tea (originally titled as ‘The Mayor’s Movie’)", "The Ayah’s Tale” (novella), all published within India Gray Historical Fiction, Ikat Press, 2015
