= Sharon Bolton =

British author

Sharon J. Bolton is a British author of mystery fiction who has also been published under the name S. J. Bolton.

== Works ==
Bolton is the author of ten novels, including the Lacey Flint series of police procedural novels. Lacey Flint is a female detective constable with London's Metropolitan police. They've released five novels and two novellas detailing her investigations.

A planned trilogy starting with The Craftsman (2018) has been optioned for a television series.

== Awards ==
Bolton's second novel, Awakening, won the 2010 Mary Higgins Clark Award. Blood Harvest, her third book, was shortlisted for the 2010 Crime Writers' Association's (CWA) Gold Dagger. In 2014, she won the CWA's Dagger in the Library award for her body of work.

== Biblio ==
=== Lacey Flint ===
==== Novels ====
1. —— (2011). Now You See Me. Bantam. ISBN 9780593064139.
2. —— (2012). Dead Scared. Bantam. ISBN 9780593064153.
3. —— (2013). Like This, for Ever. Bantam. ISBN 9780593069165.^{A}
4. —— (2014). A Dark and Twisted Tide. Bantam. ISBN 9780593069189.
5. —— (2022). The Dark. Orion. ISBN 9781409198345.

==== Novellas ====
1.5 —— (2012). If Snow Hadn't Fallen. Transworld. ISBN 9781448168408.^{B}
4.5 —— (2016). Here Be Dragons. Transworld Digital. ISBN 9781473540477.^{C}

=== The Craftsman Trilogy ===
==== Novels ====
1. —— (2018). The Craftsman. Trapeze. ISBN 9781409174110.
2. —— (2022). The Buried. Orion. ISBN 9781409174158.

==== Novella ====
0.5 —— (2018). Alive. Trapeze. ISBN 9781409179801.^{D}

=== Other books ===
- —— (2008). Sacrifice. Bantam. ISBN 9780593059111.
- —— (2009). Awakening. Bantam. ISBN 9780593059234.
- —— (2010). Blood Harvest. Bantam. ISBN 9780593064115.
- —— (2015). Little Black Lies. Bantam. ISBN 9780593069202.
- —— (2016). Daisy in Chains. Bantam. ISBN 9780593076316.
- —— (2017). Dead Woman Walking. Bantam. ISBN 9780593076422.
- —— (2020). The Split. Trapeze. ISBN 9781409174196.
- —— (2021). The Pact. Trapeze. ISBN 9781409198307.
- —— (2023). The Fake Wife. Orion. ISBN 9781398709812.

=== Notes ===
^A (in the US, Like This, for Ever was known as Lost and was published by Minotaur)
^B takes place after Now You See Me
^C takes place after A Dark and Twisted Tide
^D takes place before the first two novels. a third planned novel has not been published.

== Adaptions ==
In 2016, the motion picture of Sacrifice, starring Radha Mitchell and Rupert Graves, and directed by Peter A. Dowling, was released by Luminous Pictures.
