= Hester Latterly =

Hester Latterly is a main character of Anne Perry's Monk detective series. She is a nurse by trade who served with Florence Nightingale in the Crimean War (1853 –1856). Upon her return home in 1856 she finds her family in a shambles and meets William Monk who is investigating a crime related to her family. Her inquisitive nature eventually allows her to help Monk in his investigations, despite annoying him at first. After trying to work in a free hospital, she is fired for insubordination and takes to private nursing clients. After this, with the help of her friend Callandra Daviot, she opens a clinic for injured and sick prostitutes in the Central London slums. She marries William Monk 4 years after they meet. They have no children yet, but have adopted a 'mudlark' named Scuff.
