= Hank Phillippi Ryan =

American investigative reporter

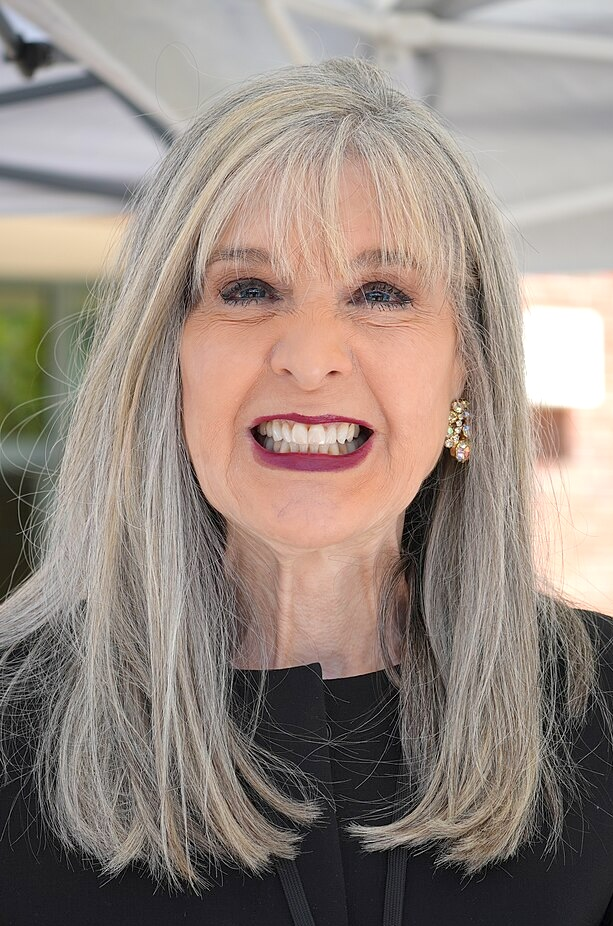
- Ryan at San Diego Writers Festival 2025
- Born: Harriet Ann Sablosky; Indianapolis, Indiana, U.S.
- Education: Western College for Women; International School of Hamburg
- Occupation: writer}}
- Writing career
- Genres: Mysteries; thrillers
- Notable awards: Emmy (multiple); Murrow (multiple); Agatha (2007, 2009); Anthony (2010); Macavity (2010); Mary Higgins Clark (2013)
- Website: hankphillippiryan.com

Hank Phillippi Ryan (born Harriet Ann Sablosky) is a former American investigative reporter for 7 News on WHDH-TV, a local television station in Boston, Massachusetts. She is also a USA Today bestselling author of 16 mystery novels.

== Biography ==
Ryan is a native of Chicago, Illinois and grew up in Indianapolis, Indiana. She attended Western College for Women in Oxford, Ohio and studied at the International School in Hamburg, Germany. Her first job in broadcasting was in 1971 as reporter for WIBC radio, then after a stint as a legislative assistant in Washington, DC for the Administrative Practice and Procedure Subcommittee of the Senate Judiciary Committee, she became an editorial assistant at Rolling Stone's Washington Bureau.

She joined WTHR-TV in Indianapolis as political reporter in 1975, then WSB-TV in Atlanta in 1976 as political reporter and weekend anchor. Ryan joined WNEV-TV (present-day WHDH) in 1983 as a general assignment reporter and in 1989, she was named principal reporter for the station's investigative unit. Ryan has won 37 Emmy Awards and Edward R. Murrow Awards for her investigative and consumer reporting.

Ryan, under her former professional name Harriet Ann Phillippi, was the journalist whose Freedom of Information Act (FOIA) request with the CIA, and the subsequent court case that arose from it, Philippi v. CIA, created the unusual FOIA exemption known as the "Glomar Response". She had filed a FOIA with the agency asking for records about their attempts to secretly recover the sunken Soviet submarine K-129 from the Pacific Ocean floor in 1974 using the purpose-built ship Hughes Glomar Explorer, as part of Project Azorian, which was one of the most complex, expensive, and secretive intelligence operations of the Cold War at a cost of about $800 million, or $5.2 billion today. Rather than simply withhold certain documents or redact portions of documents, the CIA refused to either confirm or deny the existence of such documents. This type of non-responsive reply has since come to be known as the "Glomar response" or "Glomarization".

A USA Today bestselling author, Ryan has won multiple awards for her crime fiction, including Agathas, Anthonys, the Daphne, Macavitys, and for The Other Woman, the Mary Higgins Clark Award. National reviews have called her a "master at crafting suspenseful mysteries" and "a superb and gifted storyteller."

An investigative reporter at Boston's WHDH-TV and a television reporter since 1975, her work has resulted in new laws, people sent to prison, homes removed from foreclosure, and millions of dollars in refunds and restitution for victims and consumers. She has won 37 Emmy Awards for her investigative reporting.

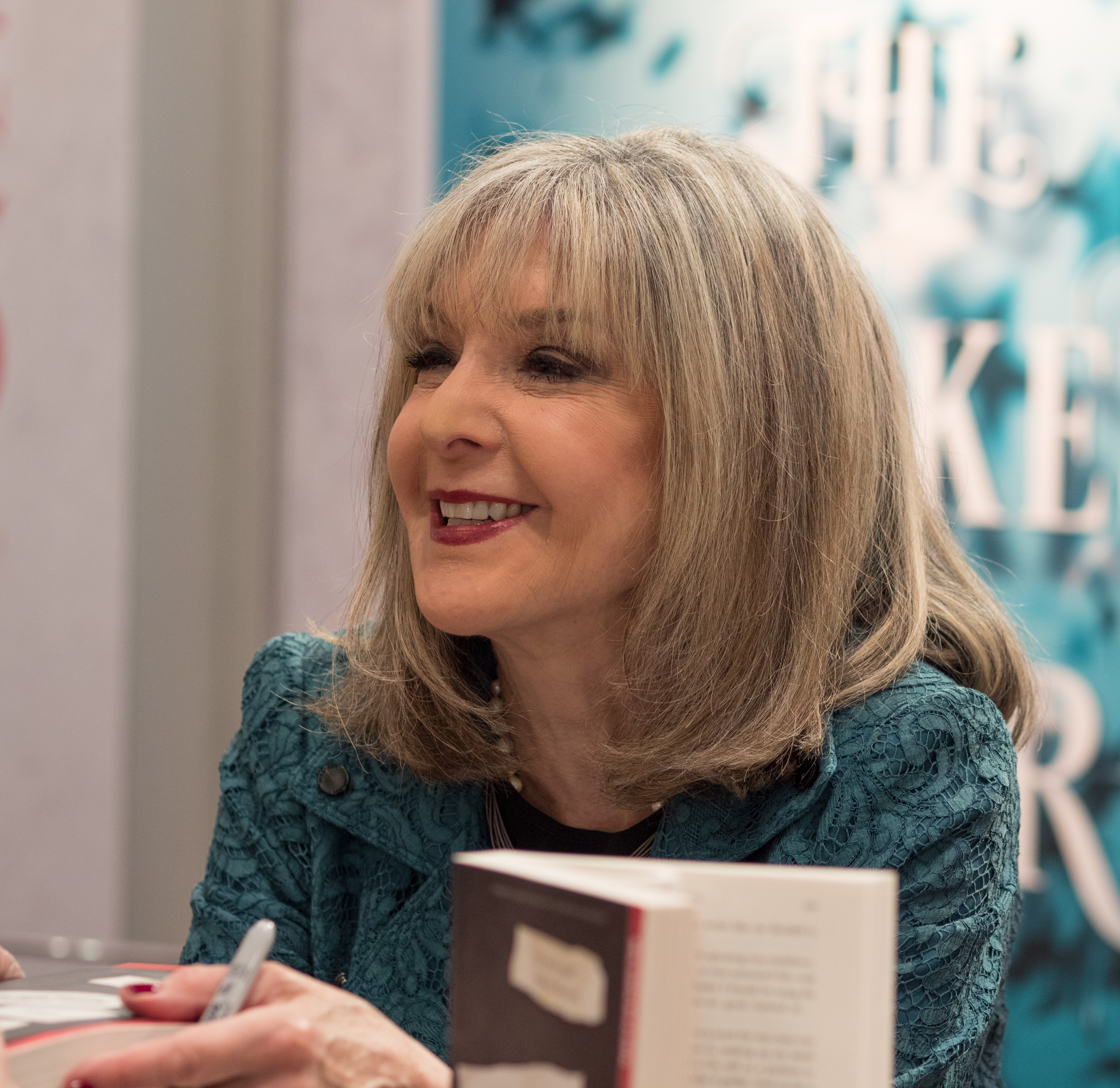
Ryan at BookExpo America in 2018

Ryan was the 2019 Guest of Honor at Bouchercon, the world mystery convention.

== Personal life ==
Ryan lives with her husband, civil rights and criminal defense lawyer Jonathan Shapiro, in suburban Boston. Although referred to by family as "Ann" or "Annie" while growing up, she was given her trademark nickname "Hank" by a college friend who told her "You don’t look like a Harriet. I’ll call you 'Hank'."

== Bibliography ==
=== Charlotte McNally series ===
- Prime Time (2007), Harlequin. ISBN 978-0-373-88135-2
- Face Time (2007), Harlequin. ISBN 978-0-373-88143-7
- Air Time (2009), Mira. ISBN 978-0-7783-2719-6
- Drive Time (2009), Mira. ISBN 978-0-7783-2797-4

=== Jane Ryland/Jake Brogan thrillers ===
- The Other Woman (2012), Forge Books. ISBN 978-0-7653-3257-8
- The Wrong Girl (2013), Forge Books. ISBN 978-0-7653-3258-5
- Truth Be Told (2014), Forge Books. ISBN 978-0-7653-7493-6
- What you See (2015), Forge Books. ISBN 978-0-7653-7495-0
- Say No More (2016), Forge Books. ISBN 978-0-7653-8535-2

=== Standalones ===
- Trust Me (2018), Forge Books. ISBN 978-0-7653-9307-4
- The Murder List (2019), Forge Books. ISBN 978-1-2501-9721-4
- The First to Lie (2020), Forge Books. ISBN 978-1-2502-5880-9
- Her Perfect Life (2021), Forge Books. ISBN 978-1-2502-5888-5
- The House Guest (2023), Forge Books. ISBN 978-1-2508-4956-4
- All This Could Be Yours (2025), Minotaur Books. ISBN 978-1-2503-4999-6
