= Wendy Corsi Staub =

American writer (born 1964)

- Born: October 29, 1964 (age 61); Dunkirk, New York, U.S.
- Education: State University of New York at Fredonia
- Occupation: Writer
- Spouse: Mark J. Staub (m. 1991)
- Children: 2
- Writing career
- Pen name: Wendy Brody; Wendy Markham; Wendy Morgan
- Genre: Young adult fiction
- Notable awards: RITA Award (1994)
- Website: wendycorsistaub.com

Wendy Corsi Staub (born October 29, 1964) is an American writer of suspense novels and young adult fiction. She has written under her own name as well as Wendy Brody, Wendy Markham, and Wendy Morgan.

== Career ==
Staub was born in Dunkirk, New York on October 29, 1964. She enjoyed reading as a child, serving on her student newspaper and yearbooks and publishing poetry in Seventeen. After graduating from State University of New York at Fredonia, Staub joined the publishing industry.

=== Awards and adaptations ===
Staub has won various awards during her career. Summer Lightning won a Romance Writers of America Rita Award in 1994.

Staub won the Romance Writers of America-NYC Golden Apple Award for lifetime achievement in 2007. She has won several Washington Irving Book Awards from the Westchester Library Association, including one for Nightwatcher in 2012.

Her book Live to Tell received a starred review from Publishers Weekly.

Blue Moon was nominated for a Mary Higgins Clark award.

Hello, It's Me was adapted into a television movie starring Kellie Martin.

== Personal life ==
She married Mark J. Staub in 1991. She has two sons, Morgan and Brody.

== Works ==
=== The Foundlings trilogy ===
- Little Girl Lost. William Morrow, 2018. ISBN 9780062742056
- Dead Silence (also published as Little Boy Blue). William Morrow, 2019. ISBN 9780062742063

=== The Mundy’s Landing trilogy ===
- Blood Red. William Morrow, 2015. ISBN 9780062349736
- Blue Moon. William Morrow, 2015. ISBN 9780062349750
- Bone White. William Morrow, 2017. ISBN 9780062349774

=== The Lily Dale series ===
- Nine Lives. Crooked Lane Books, 2015. ISBN 9781629532486
- Something Buried, Something Blue. Crooked Lane Books, 2016. ISBN 9781629537726
- Dead of Winter. Crooked Lane Books, 2017. ISBN 9781683313335

=== Social Media series ===
- The Good Sister. Harper, 2013. ISBN 9780062222374
- The Perfect Stranger. Harper, 2014. ISBN 9780062222404
- The Black Widow. Harper, 2015. ISBN 9780062222435

=== Nightwatcher trilogy ===
- Nightwatcher. Harper, 2012. ISBN 9780062070289
- Sleepwalker. Harper, 2012. ISBN 9780062070302
- Shadowkiller. Harper, 2013. ISBN 9780062070326

=== Live to Tell trilogy ===
- Live to Tell. Avon, 2010. ISBN 9780061895067
- Scared to Death. Avon, 2010. ISBN 9780061895074
- Hell to Pay. Avon, 2011. ISBN 9780061895081

=== Standalones ===
- Dying Breath (original title: Dying Light). Zebra, 2008. ISBN 9781420101317
- Dead Before Dark (sequel to Dying Breath). Zebra, 2009. ISBN 9781420101324
- Lullaby and Goodnight. Pinnacle, 2005. ISBN 9780786016426
- Kiss Her Goodbye. Pinnacle, 2004. ISBN 9780786016419
- Most Likely to Die (with Lisa Jackson and Beverly Barton). Zebra, 2007. ISBN 9780821775769
- The Final Victim. Kensington, 2006. ISBN 9780821779712
- She Loves Me Not. Pinnacle, 2003. ISBN 9780786014248
- In the Blink of an Eye. Pinnacle, 2002. ISBN 9780786014231
- The Last To Know. Pinnacle, 2001. ISBN 9780786011964
- All The Way Home. Pinnacle, 2000. ISBN 9780786010929
- Fade to Black. Pinnacle, 2002. ISBN 9780786014880
- Dearly Beloved. Pinnacle, 2003. ISBN 9780786014897

=== Written as Wendy Markham ===
==== Standalone books ====
- Hello, It’s Me. Forever, 2005. ISBN 9780446614535
- If Only in My Dreams. Signet, 2006. ISBN 9780451220035
- The Best Gift (sequel to If Only in My Dreams). Signet, 2009. ISBN 9780451228444
- Love, Suburban Style. Forever, 2007. ISBN 9780446618434
- Mike, Mike and Me. Red Dress Ink, 2004. ISBN 9780373895076
- Thoroughly Modern Princess. Avon, 2003. ISBN 9780380820542
- The Long Way Home. Jove, 1999. ISBN 9780515124408

==== “Slightly” series ====
- Slightly Single. Harlequin, 2004. ISBN 9780373810796
- Slightly Settled. Red Dress Ink, 2004. ISBN 9780373250479
- Slightly Engaged. Red Dress Ink, 2004. ISBN 9780373895649
- Slightly Married. Red Dress Ink, 2007. ISBN 9781426833694
- Slightly Suburban. Red Dress Ink, 2008. ISBN 9780373895618

==== Chickalini Family series ====
- The Nine Month Plan. Forever, 2003. ISBN 9780446611756
- Once Upon a Blind Date. Warner Books, 2005. ISBN 9780446696609
- Bride Needs Groom. Forever, 2005. ISBN 9780446614542
- That’s Amore. Forever, 2008. ISBN 9780446618441

=== Young adult works ===
==== Standalone and short stories ====
- Scream and Scream Again (contributor). HarperCollins, 2018. ISBN 9780062495662
- Witch Hunt. Zebra, 1995. ISBN 9780821748787
- Sweet Valley University: Rush Week (Ghostwritten for Francine Pascal). ISBN 9780553493061
- Halloween Party. Zebra, 1994. ISBN 9780821747322
- Summer Lightning. HarperPrism, 1993. ISBN 9780061067785
- Real Life: Help Me. Simon Pulse, 1995. ISBN 9780671872748
- Turning 17: More Than This. HarperCollins, 2000. ISBN 9780064472388
- Turning 17: This Boy Is Mine. HarperCollins, 2001. ISBN 9780064472425
- Charmed: Voodoo Moon. Pocket Books, 1999. ISBN 9780743409292

==== Lily Dale series ====
- Lily Dale: Awakening. Walker Books for Young Readers, 2007. ISBN 9780802796547
- Lily Dale: Believing. Walker Books for Young Readers, 2008. ISBN 9780802796561
- Lily Dale: Connecting. Walker Books for Young Readers, 2008. ISBN 9780802797858
- Lily Dale: Discovering. Walker Books for Young Readers, 2009. ISBN 9780802797865

==== Teen Angels series ====
- Mitzi Malloy and the Anything but Heavenly Summer. Zebra, 1995. ISBN 9780821749869
- Brittany Butterfield and the Back to School Blues. Zebra, 1995. ISBN 9780821750575
- Henry Hopkins and the Horrible Halloween Happening. Zebra, 1995. ISBN 9780821751220
- Candace Caine and the Bah, Humbug Christmas. Zebra, 1995. ISBN 9780821751794

==== The Loop series ====
- Getting Attached. Silhouette, 1994. ISBN 9780373202058
- Getting Hitched. Silhouette, 1995. ISBN 9780373202126
- Getting It Together. Silhouette, 1994. ISBN 9780373202010

==== Voodoo series ====
- Obsession (Written as Wendy Morgan). Pinnacle, 1996. ISBN 9780786015597
- Possession (Written as Wendy Morgan). Zebra, 1996. ISBN 9780821751534

=== Other writings ===
- Gossip (Movie tie-in/screenplay novelization). Avon Books, 1999. ISBN 9780380814824
- Party of Five: A Family Album (TV Tie-In). Berkley Trade, 1998. ISBN 9780425164952
- Prince Harry (Written as Wendy Brody). Pinnacle, 2000. ISBN 9780786011452
- Never on a Sundae (contributor). Berkley Trade, 2004. ISBN 9780425198964
- Ask Me Again (Written as Wendy Morgan). Zebra, 2000. ISBN 9780821766699
- Loving Max (Written as Wendy Morgan). Zebra, 1999. ISBN 9780821763483
- Murder on Broadway (with Ed Koch). Kensington, 1996. ISBN 9781575660493
- Murder on 34th Street (with Ed Koch). Kensington, 1997. ISBN 9781575662329
- The Senator Must Die (with Ed Koch). Kensington, 1998. ISBN 9781575663258
- Dangerous (Written with Fabio). Pinnacle, 1996. ISBN 9780786002832
- Wild (Written with Fabio). Pinnacle, 1997. ISBN 9780786004119
- Mysterious (Written with Fabio). Pinnacle, 1998. ISBN 9780786004911
