= Caroline and Charles Todd =

American mystery novelist

Charles Todd is the pseudonym used by the mother-and-son writing team of Caroline Todd (November 13, 1934 – August 28, 2021) and Charles Todd, best known for their two historical mystery series, both set during and immediately after World War I, the first about British Inspector Ian Rutledge, and the second about British war nurse Bess Crawford.

== Ian Rutledge Mysteries ==
In the early 1990s, Carolyn Watjen (born Carolyn Linene Teachey) convinced her son David Watjen to collaborate with her on a mystery novel. For the protagonist, they settled on Ian Rutledge, a British veteran of trench warfare during World War I who is attempting to return to his Scotland Yard career as a police detective inspector. However, Rutledge must keep his greatest burden a secret: suffering from shell shock, he lives with the constant, cynical, taunting voice of Hamish MacLeod, a young Scottish soldier he was forced to execute on the battlefield for refusing an order only moments before an artillery shell killed everyone in Rutledge's platoon except him.

When they were asked years later why they chose Britain as the setting rather than America, they replied, "England [after World War I] had a greater variety of uniqueness in a smaller area, and the villages each had a distinct personality, more so perhaps than the suburbs of Omaha or Phoenix."

The resultant novel was A Test of Wills, which they submitted as an unsolicited manuscript to William Morrow under the single name Charles Todd, not believing it would be accepted. The publisher did offer a single book contract, and their editor was content to use their pseudonym Charles Todd as the author. A Test of Wills was subsequently nominated for numerous awards — John Creasey, Edgar, Anthony, and Dilys — and won the Barry Award for Best First Novel. In addition, the Independent Mystery Booksellers Association named A Test of Wills one of the 100 favorite mysteries of the 20th Century, it received a starred review in Publishers Weekly, and The New York Times named it Notable Book of the Year.

The pair were subsequently offered a multi-book deal, and collaborated on over twenty Ian Rutledge novels. When their collaboration became publicly known in 2000, they simply used dual pseudonyms, "Carolyn Todd" and "Charles Todd", to protect their privacy.

They also wrote the suspense novel The Murder Stone in 2003. Although it was also set in Britain during the Great War, it was unconnected to the Ian Rutledge series.

== Bess Crawford ==
In 2009, the pair created a new series based around Bess Crawford, a British war nurse who had circulated in the same upper class social circles as Ian Rutledge before the war. Bess had been raised in India while her father, an army colonel, was stationed there, and learned many soldierly skills including riding and shooting. Now back in England, Bess was not allowed to join any of the armed forces during World War I, so she has enlisted as a combat nurse, and is often stationed at field hospitals just behind the trenches on the Western Front.

Caroline and David wrote over a dozen novels in this series, while at the same time maintaining their output of Ian Rutledge novels.

== Death of Caroline ==
In August 2021, Caroline died from complications of a lung infection, age 86. David decided to continue writing both series on his own, and as of 2026, had produced three Ian Rutledge novels and one Bess Crawford novel.

== Awards ==
A Test of Wills (1996)

- Nominated for John Creasey Award, Edgar Award, Anthony Award, and Dilys Award.
- Won Barry Award for Best First Novel

Wings of Fire (1998)

- Nominated for Dilys Award
- Shortlisted for the first Ellis Peters Mystery Award

Legacy of the Dead (2000)

- Nominated for Anthony Award

The Red Door (2009)

- Finalist for Macavity Award for Best Historical Novel

A Duty to the Dead (2009)

- Finalist for Macavity Award for Best Historical Novel

An Unmarked Grave (2012)

- Won Macavity Award for Best Historical Mystery
- Nominated for Agatha Award for Best Historical Novel.

A Question of Honor (2013)

- Won Agatha Award for Best Historical Novel.
- Finalist for Nero Award

An Unwilling Accomplice (2014)

- Finalist Agatha Award for Best Historical Novel

The Shattered Tree (2016)

- Won Mary Higgins Clark Award

A Forgotten Place (2018)

- Finalist for Sue Grafton Award
- Finalist for Macavity Award for Best Historical Mystery

== Publications ==
Inspector Ian Rutledge

- A Test of Wills (1996) . ISBN 0-06-124284-5
- Wings of Fire (1998) . ISBN 0-312-96568-0
- Search the Dark (1999) . ISBN 0-312-97128-1
- Legacy of the Dead (2000) . ISBN 0-553-58315-8
- Watchers of Time (2001) . ISBN 0-553-58316-6
- A Fearsome Doubt (2002) . ISBN 0-553-58317-4
- A Cold Treachery (2005) . ISBN 0-553-58661-0
- A Long Shadow (2006) . ISBN 0-06-078673-6
- A False Mirror (2007) . ISBN 0-06-078673-6
- A Pale Horse (2008) . ISBN 0-06-123356-0
- A Matter of Justice (2009) . ISBN 0-06-123359-5
- The Red Door (2010) . ISBN 978-0-06-172616-3
- A Lonely Death (2011) . ISBN 978-0-06-172619-4
- The Confession (2012) . ISBN 978-0-06-201566-2
- Proof of Guilt (2013) . ISBN 978-0-06-201568-6
- Hunting Shadows (2014). ISBN 978-0-06-223718-7
- A Fine Summer's Day (2015). ISBN 978-0-06-223712-5
- No Shred of Evidence (2016). ISBN 978-0-06-244022-8
- Racing the Devil (2017) . ISBN 978-0-06-238621-2
- The Piper (2017) . ISBN 978-0-06-267809-6
- The Gate Keeper (2018) . ISBN 978-0-06-267871-3
- The Black Ascot (2019) . ISBN 978-0-06-267874-4
- A Divided Loyalty (2020) . ISBN 978-0-06-290553-6
- A Fatal Lie (2021) . ISBN 978-0-06-290557-4
- A Game of Fear (2022) . ISBN 978-0-06-290559-8
- A Christmas Witness (2025)
- A Day of Judgment (2026)

Bess Crawford

- A Duty to the Dead (2009) . ISBN 978-0-06-179176-5
- An Impartial Witness (2010) . ISBN 978-0-06-179178-9
- A Bitter Truth (2011) . ISBN 978-0-06-201570-9
- An Unmarked Grave (2012) . ISBN 978-0-06-201572-3
- A Question of Honor (2013) . ISBN 978-0-06-223715-6
- An Unwilling Accomplice (2014) . ISBN 978-0-06-223720-0
- A Pattern of Lies (2015) . ISBN 978-0-06-238625-0
- The Shattered Tree (2016) . ISBN 978-0-06-238628-1
- A Casualty of War (2017) . ISBN 978-0-06-267879-9
- A Forgotten Place (2018) . ISBN 978-0-06-267883-6
- A Cruel Deception (2019) . ISBN 978-0-06-285983-9
- A Hanging at Dawn (2020) . ISBN 978-0-06-304856-0
- An Irish Hostage (2021) . ISBN 978-0-06-285985-3
- The Cliff's Edge (2023)

Stand-alone novels

- The Murder Stone (2003) . ISBN 0-553-80348-4
- The Walnut Tree (2012) . ISBN 978-0-06-223699-9
