= Jacqueline Winspear =

English mystery writer (b1955)

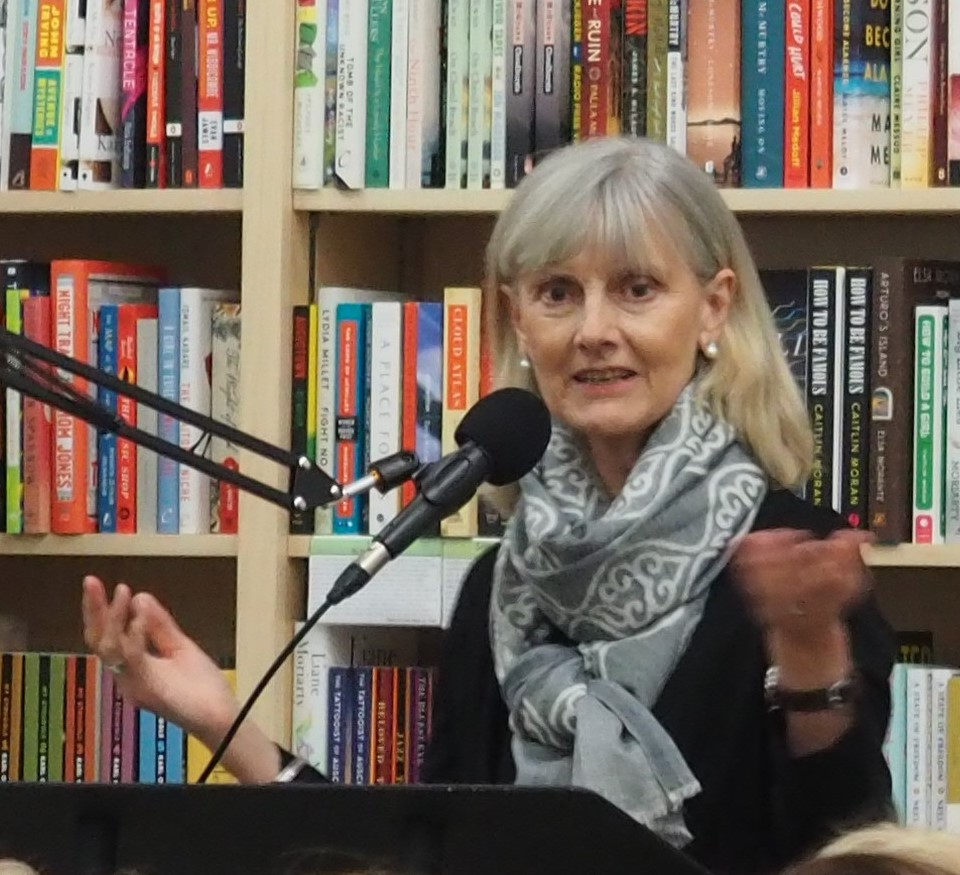
- Born: 30 April 1955 (age 71); Kent, England
- Education: University of London
- Occupation: Writer
- Notable work: Maisie Dobbs
- Spouse: John Morrell

Signature
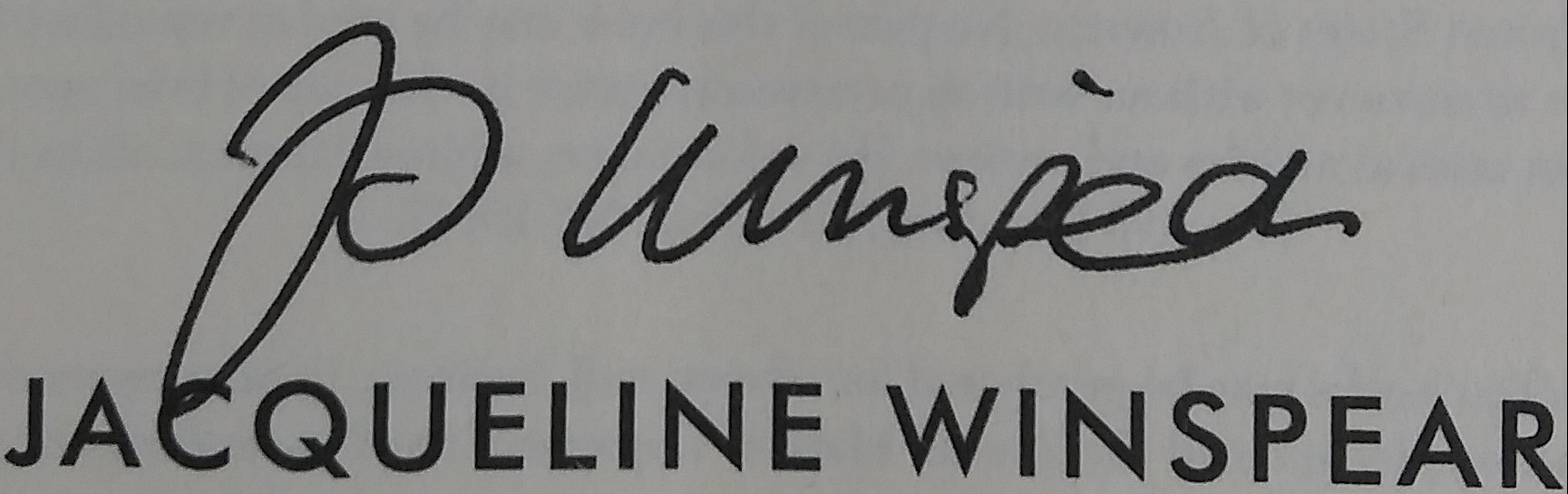

Jacqueline Winspear (born 30 April 1955) is a mystery writer, author of the Maisie Dobbs series of books exploring the aftermath of World War I. She has won several mystery writing awards for books in this popular series.

== Personal life and career ==
Winspear was born on 30 April 1955 and raised in Cranbrook, in Kent. She attended Cranbrook Primary School and Cranbrook School. She was educated at the University of London's Institute of Education and then worked in academic publishing, higher education, and marketing communications. She emigrated to the United States in 1990. Winspear stated that her childhood awareness of her grandfather's suffering in World War I led to an interest in that period.

== Maisie Dobbs series ==
Maisie Dobbs is a private investigator who untangles painful and shameful secrets stemming from war experiences. A gifted working class girl in class-conscious England, she receives an unusual education thanks to the patronage of her employer, who had taken her on as a housemaid.

She interrupts her education to work as a nurse in the Great War, falls in love and suffers her own losses. After the war, she finishes her university education, then works under the tutelage of her mentor. When he retires, she sets up as an investigator in her own office.

Dobbs places emphasis on achieving healing for her clients and insists they comply with her ethical approach.

She grows older throughout the series of novels; further, her cases reflect the times, from the Great War to the Second World War.

== Books ==
=== Maisie Dobbs series ===
1. Maisie Dobbs (2003) ISBN 9781569473306, OCLC 519884816
2. Birds of a Feather (2004)
3. Pardonable Lies (2005)
4. Messenger of Truth (2006)
5. An Incomplete Revenge (2008)
6. Among the Mad (2009)
7. The Mapping of Love and Death (2010)
8. A Lesson in Secrets (2011)
9. Elegy for Eddie (2012)
10. Leaving Everything Most Loved (2013)
11. A Dangerous Place (2015)
12. Journey to Munich (2016)
13. In This Grave Hour (2017)
14. To Die but Once (2018)
15. The American Agent Harper Collins, 2019. ISBN 9780062436665, OCLC 1041763123
16. The Consequences of Fear (2021) ISBN 978-0062868022
17. A Sunlit Weapon (2022)
18. The Comfort of Ghosts (2024)

=== Standalone ===
- The Care and Management of Lies New York : HarperCollins Publishers, 2014. ISBN 9780062336132, OCLC 894542985
- What Would Maisie Do?: Inspiration from the Pages of Maisie Dobbs New York : HarperCollins Publishers, 2019. ISBN 9780062859341
- The White Lady New York : HarperCollins Publishers, 2023. ISBN 978006286798-8

=== Memoir ===
- This Time Next Year We'll Be Laughing (2020) ISBN 978-1641292696 (Ms. Winspear also narrates the Audible audio version of her childhood memoir)
