= A Test of Wills =

1996 historical mystery novel by Charles Todd

- Author: Charles Todd
- Series: Ian Rutledge Mysteries
- Genre: Historical mystery
- Publisher: William Morrow
- Publication date: 1996
- ISBN: 978-0-06-209161-1
- Followed by: Wings of Fire

A Test of Wills is the first in a series of historical mystery novels by American writers Caroline and Charles Todd, writing under the pseudonym Charles Todd, that are set immediately after World War I featuring Inspector Ian Rutledge of Scotland Yard . It was published by William Morrow, an imprint of HarperCollins, in 1996, and won and was nominated for several awards.

== Plot ==
Ian Rutledge has returned from three years on the Western Front a very damaged man. Forced to execute Hamish MacLeod, one of his own men for cowardice, he now hears the voice of Hamish inside his head. His own supervisor, Superintendent Bowles, dislikes him, and cannily gives Rutledge an assignment: A popular colonel in the village of Upper Streetham has been shot from his horse.

In the village, Rutledge determines that Captain Mark Wilton, a popular decorated pilot and chum of the Prince of Wales, was seen arguing with the murder victim the evening before, making him the main suspect. Rutledge realizes the trap that Bowles has set. If Rutledge arrests the war hero, it is likely the end of his career due to political repercussions. But there are other suspects, including a truculent agitator who had loudly called for an end to the local aristocracy, and the ward of the murder victim, who was engaged to Captain Wilton. Rutledge's only hope of a witness might be a returned soldier who is even more damaged by shellshock that he, and fine details begin to obscure the murder. What were Captain Wilton and the murder victim arguing about? Why is Wilton's fiancée unwilling to talk about either the victim or her fiancé? Where is the shotgun that killed the colonel? And does this have anything to do with a child being run over in a motorcar accident several years before?

In the end, Rutledge is able to put the pieces together, confronting a murderer with a broken mind.

== Publication history ==
In the early 1990s, Carolyn Watjen (born Carolyn Linene Teachey) convinced her son David Watjen to collaborate with her on a mystery novel. For the protagonist, they settled on Ian Rutledge, a British veteran of trench warfare during World War I who is attempting to return to his Scotland Yard career as a police detective inspector. The resultant novel was A Test of Wills, which they submitted as an unsolicited manuscript to William Morrow under the single name Charles Todd, not believing it would be accepted. The publisher did offer a single book contract, and their editor was content to use their singular pseudonym Charles Todd as the author. A Test of Wills was subsequently nominated for numerous awards — John Creasey, Edgar, Anthony, and Dilys — and won the Barry Award for Best First Novel. In addition, the Independent Mystery Booksellers Association named A Test of Wills one of the 100 favorite mysteries of the 20th Century, it received a starred review in Publishers Weekly, and The New York Times named it Notable Book of the Year. Caroline and David, as Charles Todd, would go on to write over 20 more novels about Ian Rutledge.

== Reception ==
Publishers Weekly noted, "Todd, an American, depicts the outer and inner worlds of his characters with authority and sympathy as he closes in on his surprising--and convincing--conclusion."

Kirkus Reviews found that the plot unfolded at a perhaps too-slow pace, noting "The 20th century hasn't happened in Upper Streetham, which seems to have been cast out of Rebecca, or in first-novelist Todd's deeply old-fashioned storytelling, which eschews the slightest impropriety in favor of the patient subtlety and circumlocution that held readers in thrall 70 years ago. A feast for the like-minded."

Writing for Isthmus, Becky Collins was not a fan of the book, commenting, "Charles Todd's A Test of Wills is so boring I can barely summon the energy to write about it ... [The internal dialogue of Hamish] alternately serves as the voice of Rutledge's conscience and harshest critic. But this feature alone isn't enough to carry the story. The mystery itself is just dull, and the solution is infuriatingly manipulative."
