= Maisie Dobbs =

2003 mystery novel by Jacqueline Winspear

- Front Cover of First Edition
- Author: Jacqueline Winspear
- Language: English
- Series: Maisie Dobbs
- Genre: Mystery
- Publisher: Soho Press
- Publication date: 1 July 2003
- Publication place: United States
- Media type: Print (Hardcover & Paperback); Audiobook E-book
- Pages: 294(US first edition)
- ISBN: 978-1-56947-330-6 (US)
- OCLC: 51251843
- Followed by: Birds of a Feather

Maisie Dobbs is a 2003 mystery novel by Jacqueline Winspear. Set in England between 1910 and 1929, it features the title character Maisie Dobbs, a private investigator building her business in the aftermath of the First World War. Generally well received by critics, mostly because of Maisie's strength of character, the novel was nominated for several awards and received the 2003 Agatha Award for Best First Novel. It is the first in the Maisie Dobbs series of novels.

== Plot ==
Maisie becomes a maid at the Belgravia Mansion of Lady Rowan Compton in 1910 at thirteen years old, after her mother dies, and she must help her father make ends meet. Soon after getting caught in Lady Compton's library fulfilling her joy of reading and learning, Maisie is introduced to Maurice Blanche, close friend of the Comptons, and becomes his pupil. Blanche, a discreet investigator, teaches Maisie as much as he can about psychology, science, and anything else Maisie is willing to learn. When Maisie becomes old enough she attends Girton College at Cambridge University, but threats of war soon intervene. World War I intensifies, and the pressures of war can be felt in Maisie's England. Deciding that the war efforts are extremely important to her and her country, Maisie volunteers as a nurse at the front, where she meets a young man, with whom she falls in love. Part of the mystery surrounding Maisie is what happens to the young man.

After the war, Maisie apprentices with Blanche in his investigative work. In 1929, after Blanche has retired, Maisie opens her own investigation business. Her first seemingly open-and-shut case involves her in a mystery surrounding something known as The Retreat, a suspicious home for veterans of the war. Maisie must act fast when she learns that Lady Compton's own son has signed over his fortune to The Retreat and is about to take asylum there. With the help of Billy Beale, a caretaker at her office and veteran of the Great War himself, she is able to infiltrate The Retreat. As Maisie uncovers the mystery of The Retreat she is also confronted with her own ghosts from the war after ten years of holding the memories at bay.

== Major themes ==
In an interview with Jacqueline Winspear, Andi Schechter of Library Journal points out that "World War I is a major theme" in the book. Winspear notes that Maisie is "very much a woman of her time" and her interest in the lives of women in Europe during the years surrounding World War I became a backdrop for the story.

== Development history ==
Jacqueline Winspear became deeply interested in World War I and its after effects because of her grandfather, who was severely wounded and shell-shocked after the Battle of the Somme in 1916. At first she did not set out to write a war novel, but her deep interest in history provided a framework for the character of Maisie Dobbs to develop. In what she describes as "a moment of artistic grace", Winspear says the character of Maisie Dobbs developed in her mind while stuck in traffic. From there, Winspear began intensely researching the Great War and 1920s England. While recovering from an accident that broke her arm and crushed her shoulder, Winspear completed over half of Maisie Dobbs with just one hand on the keyboard. She sent out sample chapters and proposals to thirty literary agents and received several phone calls back within a few weeks. Within a few months she had signed a contract with an agent and sold the book by the next spring. The book was published the following year by Soho Press, Incorporated.

== Reception ==
Maisie Dobbs was mostly well received by critics. The title character was described as strange, clever, and resourceful by New York Times Book Review crime columnist Marilyn Stasio. Reviewer for School Library Journal Susan H. Woodcock characterized Maisie as a strong protagonist. The book received a starred review from Publishers Weekly and was called an inspired debut. It was also featured as one of the 12 best mystery books of 2003 in Publishers Weekly. In addition, Maisie Dobbs was chosen as one of School Library Journal's best adult books for high school students in 2003.

Not everyone was impressed with Winspear's debut novel. Kirkus Reviews stated: "Winspear rarely attempts to elevate her prose past the common romance, and what might have been a journey through a strata of England between the wars is instead just simple, convenient and contrived." NPR book critic Maureen Corrigan noted that the coincidences in the plot are too "wopping", but commented that the secondary characters are "winning" and Maisie herself is what truly draws readers in as "part clairvoyant, part intellectual, and part new age therapist".

== Awards and nominations ==
Award	Year	Result
Agatha Award, Best First Novel	2003	Winner
Alex Award	2004	Among 10 winners
Barry Award, Best First Mystery Novel	2004	Nominated
Dilys Award	2004	Nominated
Edgar Award	2004	Nominated
Macavity Awards, Best First Mystery Novel	2004	Winner
