= Inspector Ian Rutledge =

Inspector Ian Rutledge is a fictional character in the Inspector Ian Rutledge Series of mystery/detective novels by Caroline and Charles Todd. To date the series comprises twenty-four novels and four short stories. The series revolves around the cases of Inspector Ian Rutledge, a veteran of the First World War who has returned to the police force (Scotland Yard) as a detective, but is battling with post-traumatic stress disorder. As a consequence he is haunted by the memory of a fellow soldier who is a constant voice in his head. He must hide this information from those around him in order to avoid the social stigma which accompanied psychological, mental, or emotional issues in the early 20th century.

== History of Ian Rutledge ==
Following the court martial of Corporal Hamish Macleod for failure to follow orders in the field, Macleod's commanding officer, Ian Rutledge, is forced to execute Macleod. Rutledge is then unexpectedly buried alive with the man's corpse when an artillery shell explodes in the camp. After being rescued, Rutledge discovers that it was an air pocket created by Hamish's corpse which kept him (and no one else) alive underground. He must live with his guilt, which is now personified by Hamish's consistent voice living in his head. The existence of Hamish's voice is a secret Rutledge must keep from everyone, especially his jealous Scotland Yard superior who wants to see him removed, all while solving murders. When Rutledge returns from the Western front in 1919 he is treated in a hospital for his various symptoms only to be left by his fiancée, Jean.

== Books ==
Title	Publication year	Book year
A Test of Wills	1996	1919/6
Wings of Fire	1998	1919/7
Search the Dark	1998	1919/8
Legacy of the Dead	2000	1919/9
Watchers of Time	2001	1919/10
A Fearsome Doubt	2002	1919/11
A Cold Treachery	2005	1919/12
A Long Shadow	2006	1920/1
A False Mirror	2007	1920/3
A Pale Horse	2008	1920/4
A Matter of Justice	2009	1920/5
The Red Door	2010	1920/6
The Kidnapping	2010	1920
A Lonely Death	2011	1920/7
The Confession	2011	1920/8
Proof of Guilt	2013	1920/9
Hunting Shadows	2013	1920/8
A Fine Summer's Day	2015	1914/6
No Shred of Evidence	2016	1920/10
Racing the Devil	2017	1920/11
The Piper	2017	1914/3
The Gate Keeper	2018	1920/12
The Black Ascot	2019	1910/1920
A Divided Loyalty	2020	1921/2
A Fatal Lie	2021	1921
A Game of Fear	2022	1921
