= Dave Graf =

American football player (born 1953)

No. 55, 58
- Position: Linebacker

Personal information
- Born: August 5, 1953 (age 73); Dunkirk, New York, U.S.
- Listed height: 6 ft 2 in (1.88 m)
- Listed weight: 215 lb (98 kg)

Career information
- High school: Dunkirk
- College: Penn State
- NFL draft: 1975: 17th round, 421st overall pick

Career history
- Cleveland Browns (1975–1979); Washington Redskins (1981)

Career NFL statistics
- Sacks: 0.5
- Fumble recoveries: 2
- Interceptions: 1
- Stats at Pro Football Reference

David Francis Graf (born August 5, 1953) is an American former professional football player who was a linebacker in the National Football League (NFL) for the Cleveland Browns and the Washington Redskins. He played college football for the Penn State Nittany Lions and was selected in the 17th round of the 1975 NFL draft with the 421st overall pick.
