= 4th Reconnaissance Squadron (disambiguation) =

The 4th Reconnaissance Squadron is an active United States Air Force unit.

4th Reconnaissance Squadron may also refer to:

- The 4th Space Operations Squadron, designated the 4th Reconnaissance Squadron, Long Range, Photographic from June 1945 to November 1945, the 4th Reconnaissance Squadron, Very Long Range, Photographic from November 1945 to April 1946, and the 4th Reconnaissance Squadron, Photographic from September 1946 to July 1949.
- The 394th Combat Training Squadron, designated the 4th Reconnaissance Squadron from January 1938 to December 1939, the 4th Reconnaissance Squadron (Medium Range) from December 1939 to November 1940 and 4th Reconnaissance Squadron (Heavy) from November 1940 to April 1942

== See also ==
- 4th Expeditionary Reconnaissance Squadron
- 4th Strategic Reconnaissance Squadron
- 4th Tactical Reconnaissance Squadron
- 4th Observation Squadron
