= Richard P. Klocko =

United States Air Force general

Richard Phillip Klocko
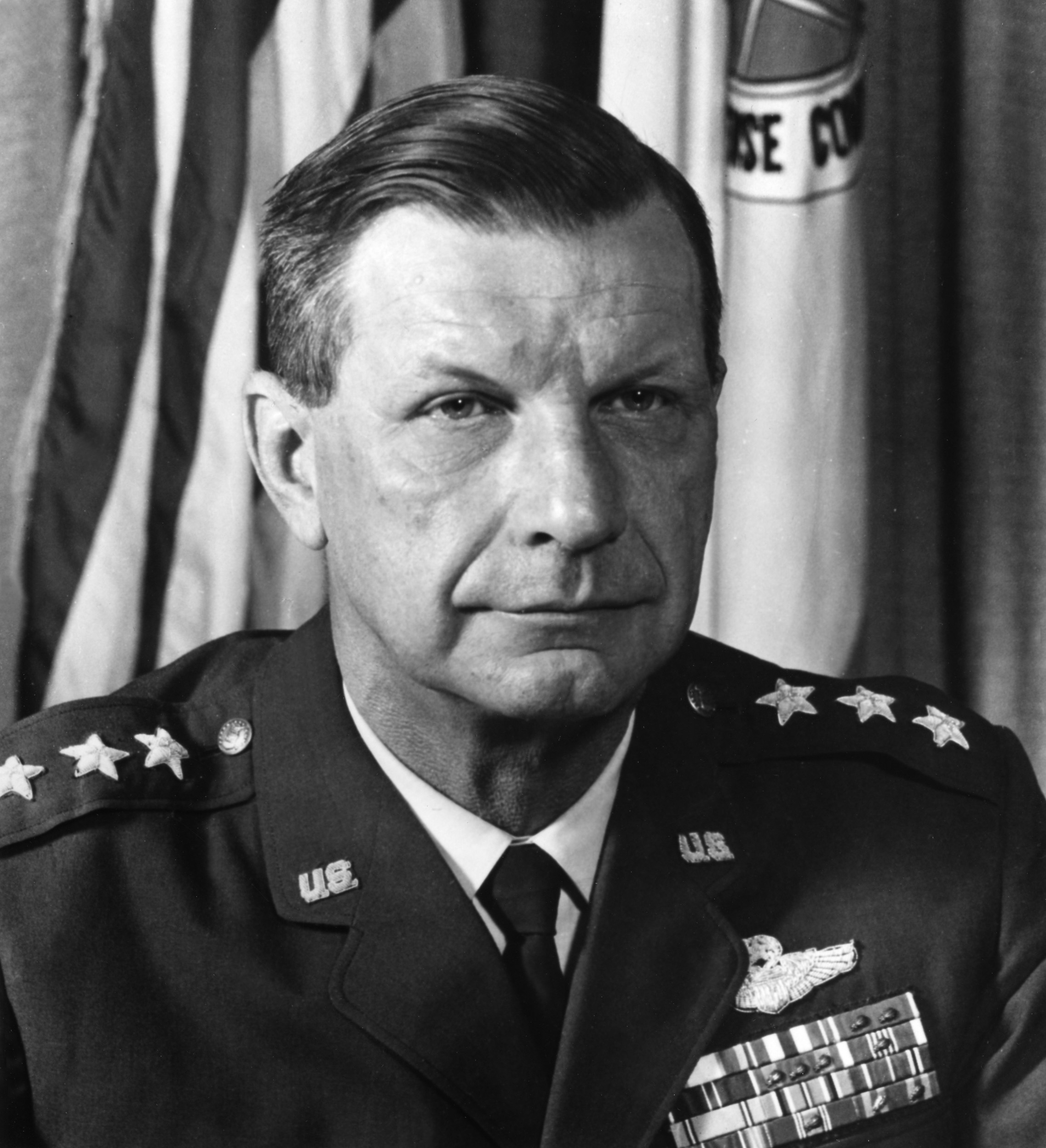
- Born: February 26, 1915; Dunkirk, New York, US
- Died: April 19, 2011 (aged 96); Hilton Head Island, South Carolina, US James Ronald "Ron" Helmly
- Military career
- Allegiance: United States
- Branch: United States Air Force
- Service years: 1941–1971
- Rank: Lieutenant General
- Nickname: "Dick"
- Awards: Air Force Distinguished Service Medal, Silver Star, Legion of Merit with two oak leaf clusters, Bronze Star Medal, Air Medal with two oak leaf clusters and the Army Commendation Medal with oak leaf cluster

Lieutenant General Richard Phillip Klocko (February 26, 1915 – April 19, 2011) was an American Air Force lieutenant general and command pilot who was director, Defense Communications Agency, Washington, D.C.

== Biography ==
Klocko was born in Dunkirk, New York, in 1915. He graduated from Dunkirk High School in 1933, received a congressional appointment to the U.S. Military Academy and graduated from there in 1937. After graduation, he completed primary and advanced flying training in October 1938.

The general's first assignment in the Army Air Corps was a 2 1/2-year tour with the 36th Pursuit Squadron, Langley Field, Va. In January 1941, he was transferred to the 36th Pursuit Group at Losey Field, Puerto Rico, where he served until June 1942. At that time he was reassigned to England where he served in the Headquarters European Theater of Operations until October 1942.

In October 1942, he was assigned to command the 350th Fighter Group being formed in England. Klocko readied the unit, equipped with P-39 fighters, for combat and moved to North Africa to support the invasion. In February 1943, while on a special mission over enemy lines, dropping messages to isolated units, he was taken a prisoner of war. For this special mission, Klocko received the Silver Star from the commanding general of the 1st Armored Division. He remained a prisoner of war in Germany until April 1945.

Following the end of the war, Klocko was assigned to the War Department General Staff, Washington, D.C., from August 1945 to October 1947. He was then appointed chief, Supplemental Research Branch, Director of Intelligence, Headquarters U.S. Air Force. From August 1949 to July 1950 Klocko attended the Air War College, and from July 1950 until July 1952, he served both as an instructor and member of the Air War College faculty.

Klocko remained at Maxwell Air Force Base, Ala., until July 1954 serving as a member of the Graduate Study Group, working on policy and doctrine for Air Force operations.

Klocko was then assigned to the U.S. Air Force Security Service, Kelly Air Force Base, Texas, as deputy chief of staff operations. He served in this capacity until June 30, 1955, when he was reassigned as chief of staff, U.S. Air Force Security Service, a position he held until July 1956. During these assignments, he received the Legion of Merit for his contribution to the Security Service mission.

In July 1956, Klocko was appointed commander, 6900th Security Wing, Frankfurt, Germany. He commanded the wing until August 1960. During this assignment he was promoted to brigadier general. In August 1960, Klocko was reassigned as deputy commander, U.S. Air Force Security Service. He was promoted to major general in January 1962 and became commander of U.S. Air Force Security Service on Sept. 1, 1962.

His decorations include the Air Force Distinguished Service Medal, Silver Star, Legion of Merit with two oak leaf clusters, Bronze Star Medal, Air Medal with two oak leaf clusters and the Army Commendation Medal with oak leaf cluster.

He died on April 19, 2011, in Hilton Head Island, South Carolina. He was buried at the West Point Cemetery.
