= Horatio G. Brooks =

American railroad engineer

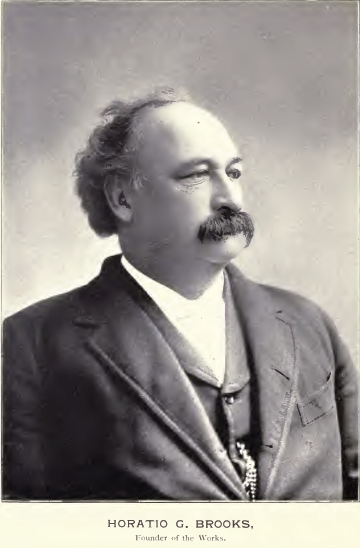
- Born: October 30, 1828; Portsmouth, New Hampshire, US
- Died: April 20, 1887 (aged 58); Dunkirk, New York, US
- Resting place: Forest Hill Cemetery, Fredonia, New York, US
- Known for: founder of Brooks Locomotive Works, three-term mayor of Dunkirk, New York
- Spouse: Julia A. Haggett

Horatio G. Brooks (October 30, 1828 – April 20, 1887) worked as chief engineer for the New York and Erie Railroad (NY&E) until the railroad moved its steam locomotive maintenance facilities from Dunkirk, New York, to Buffalo. In 1869 he leased the former NY&E shops in Dunkirk and formed Brooks Locomotive Works. Brooks also served for three terms as mayor of Dunkirk. He was a leading figure in the business and social life of the area around Dunkirk, and western New York state.

== Family and early life ==
Horatio Brooks was born on October 30, 1828, in Portsmouth, New Hampshire. His family moved to Dover, New Hampshire, in 1838.

He married Julia A. Haggett, of North Edgecomb, Maine, on March 6, 1851.

== Career ==
In 1844, he began working as an apprentice machinist in the shop of Isaac and Seth Adams, his cousins. He started with the Boston and Maine Railroad (B&M) at their shops in Andover, Massachusetts, in 1846, and worked his way up to become a fireman in 1848 and an engineer in May 1849. His experience on the B&M led to his next position as an engineer for the New York and Erie Railroad in 1850; in this position he operated the first locomotive in Chautauqua County, New York, on November 28, 1850.

He moved west in 1856 at the request of his friend from the B&M, Charles Minot, who was superintendent of the Ohio and Mississippi Railroad, where Brooks became master mechanic of the line. The move was the result of a trainmen strike against the Erie, for which both Brooks and Minot were identified for dismissal; after the superintendent during the strike resigned, Minot was recalled to the Erie and he brought Brooks back with him. Brooks was appointed superintendent of the western division of Erie Railroad in October 1862, and superintendent of motive power in 1865.

When Jay Gould ordered that the railroad's shops at Dunkirk, New York, be closed with work consolidated to other locations on the line, Brooks leased the shops buildings and formed Brooks Locomotive Works in October and November 1869.

== Death and legacy ==
Horatio Brooks died on April 20, 1887, survived by his wife and two daughters (a third daughter preceded him in death).

The Brooks Locomotive Works remained in the family for a while, with his sons-in-law Edward Nichols and Frederick H. Stevens both serving as president, Nichols from 1887 to 1892 and Stevens from 1896 to the merger that formed Alco in 1901. Stevens continued on with Alco, becoming chairman of the board of directors in 1905.

In 1898, the Stevens family donated the Horatio G. Brooks Dunkirk homestead to YMCA to become the organization's hospital and library; the donation was valued at $150,000 (equivalent to $5,805,000 in 2025). It became known as the Brooks Memorial Hospital. By 1944, the original building was slated to be razed.

Horatio Brooks's wife Julia died in 1896, leaving many shares of company stock and large amounts of cash to their descendants and family. She was buried beside her late husband in Forest Hill Cemetery.

Monuments to Horatio Brooks commemorating his work as president of Brooks Locomotive Works and his contributions to the community were proposed as early as 1903.

A locomotive that bore his name in honor was involved in a collision in 1923 when it ran out of control onto another line.

Brooks was remembered in celebration in 1923 by employees of the Brooks plant who had worked there for 25 or more years; he was hailed as "Dunkirk's first citizen."

Brooks was one of a few men nominated to be included in the Hall of Fame for New York State's exhibit at the 1939 World's Fair.
