= Chautauqua County/Dunkirk Airport =

Airport in New York, United States

- IATA: DKK; ICAO: KDKK; FAA LID: DKK

Summary
- Airport type: Public
- Owner: Chautauqua County
- Serves: Dunkirk, New York
- Elevation AMSL: 693 ft (211 m)
- Coordinates: 42°29′36″N 079°16′19″W
- Interactive map of Chautauqua County/Dunkirk Airport

Runways
Direction	Length		Surface
Direction	ft	m	Surface
6/24	6,000	1,829	Asphalt
15/33	4,000	1,219	Asphalt

Statistics (2006)
- Aircraft operations: 37,548
- Based aircraft: 41
- Source: Federal Aviation Administration

Chautauqua County/Dunkirk Airport (IATA: DKK, ICAO: KDKK, FAA LID: DKK) is a county-owned public-use airport in Chautauqua County, New York, United States. It is located three nautical miles (6 km) east of the central business district of Dunkirk, New York.

== Airport ==
Chautauqua County/Dunkirk Airport covers an area of 450 acres (180 ha) at an elevation of 693 feet (211 m) above mean sea level. It has two asphalt paved runways: 6/24 is 6,000 by 100 feet (1,524 x 30 m) and 15/33 is 4,000 by 100 feet (1,219 x 30 m).

For the 12-month period ending July 19, 2006, the airport had 37,548 aircraft operations, an average of 102 per day: 94% general aviation and 5% air taxi and 1% military. At that time there were 41 aircraft based at this airport: 78% single-engine, 17% multi-engine, 2% jet and 2% helicopter.

== Accidents and incidents ==
- On July 16, 2015 a Cessna 162 with only 1 pilot on board crashed shortly after takeoff from Dunkirk. The pilot reported that the right door opened inflight and he was unable to secure it. While attempting to secure the door, he lost control of the aircraft and crashed approximately one mile northeast of runway 6.
- On May 17, 2007, a Beechcraft Baron flying from Oshawa Executive Airport to New Castle Airport experienced an in-flight engine failure and attempted to divert to Dunkirk. The pilot was cleared for the VOR approach to Runway 24; however he missed the approach and the aircraft was observed in a flat spin, impacting the ground about 1/2 mile south-southwest of the approach end of the runway. The pilot and two passengers were fatally injured.
- On December 14, 2005, a Piper PA-46 and a Piper Aerostar collided at the intersection of runway 6/24 and runway 15/33. Both aircraft were landing at the time of the collision. The NTSB placed the blame on the pilot of the PA-46 who was using the incorrect common traffic advisory frequency and landed on runway 6, while the Aerostar and an uninvolved Cessna were using runway 15 that was favored by the current wind conditions. The wingtips of the aircraft contacted. Both aircraft were substantially damaged but there were no injuries.

== See also ==
- List of airports in New York
