= WDOE =

Radio station in Dunkirk, New York, United States

Coordinates: 42°27′49″N 79°21′21″W

- Dunkirk, New York; United States
- Broadcast area: Western New York
- Frequency: 1410 kHz
- Branding: Classic Hits 101.5 FM and 1410 AM

Programming
- Format: Classic hits
- Affiliations: ABC News Radio; Premiere Networks; Westwood One; Buffalo Bills; Buffalo Sabres

Ownership
- Owner: Chadwick Bay Broadcasting
- Sister stations: WBKX

History
- First air date: 1949 (as WFCB)
- Former call signs: WFCB (1949–1957)
- Call sign meaning: W Dunkirk-On-Erie

Technical information
- Licensing authority: FCC
- Facility ID: 49209
- Class: D
- Power: 1,000 watts day 31 watts night
- Translators: 101.5 W268CX (Dunkirk); 105.5 W288EJ (Dunkirk)

Links
- Public license information: Public file; LMS
- Webcast: Listen Live
- Website: chautauquatoday.com

WDOE (1410 AM) is a radio station located in Dunkirk, New York. It is owned by Alan Bishop, who also owns sister station WBKX in Fredonia. The station operates on an AM frequency of 1410 kHz. On December 7, 2012, WDOE began simulcasting on an FM translator at 94.9 MHz. On November 5, 2020, it added a second FM signal at 101.5 MHz. The station then dropped is 94.9 FM signal in the spring of 2022. In 2024 WDOE added another FM signal at 105.5 serving the Westfield, NY area.

WDOE operates a mostly automated classic hits format and features newsman Greg Larson. Dan Palmer, a New York State Broadcasters Hall of Famer, hosts the morning show from 6:00-8:45 AM, and Greg hosts "Viewpoint," a daily 15-minute public affairs program. The station also broadcasts local high school football, basketball, baseball, and softball games, mainly for Dunkirk and Fredonia high schools.

On Saturdays, WDOE broadcasts the nationally syndicated Backtrax USA from 8:00-10:00 PM and American Top 40: The 1970s from 5:00-8:00 PM. Sunday mornings at 10:00 AM, local personality Tina Zboch hosts an hour-long polka show.

WDOE also serves as an affiliate of ABC News and Buffalo Bills football. Former Bills announcer Van Miller was one of the station's first employees. Danny Neaverth also worked at the station in the late 1950s.

Former logo
