= 35th Signal Battalion (United States) =

35th Signal Battalion - Enhanced (ESB-E)
- Active: 1942–1945; 1948–1959; 1980–present
- Country: United States
- Branch: U.S. Army Reserve
- Type: Battalion
- Size: 389
- Part of: 210th Regional Support Command
- Garrison/HQ: Juana Diaz, Puerto Rico (Headquarters)
- Motto: We Carry The Word
- Engagements: World War II; Global War on Terrorism; Iraq War
- Decorations: Meritorious Unit Commendation

Commanders
- Current commander: LTC Erin G. Begonia

Insignia
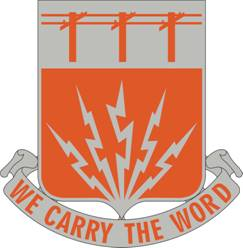
- Distinctive Unit Insignia

The 35th Signal Battalion - Enhanced is a reserve unit of the United States Army. The 35th provides critical battlefield communication support for combat operations worldwide. It is headquartered at the Fort Allen Armed Forces Reserve Center Fort Allen, Puerto Rico. The 35th Signal Battalion - Enhanced has four companies: HHC, A Co, B Co, and C Co.

== Lineage ==
- Constituted on 11 May 1942 in the Army of the United States as the 35th Signal Construction Battalion
- Activated 23 February 1943 at Camp Crowder, Missouri
- Reorganized and redesignated on 20 May 1945 as the 35th Signal Light Construction Battalion
- Inactivated 5 October 1945 at Camp Polk, Louisiana
- Allotted 12 January 1948 to the Organized Reserves
- Activated 16 January 1948 with headquarters at Newark, New Jersey

(Organized Reserves redesignated 25 March 1948 as the Organized Reserve Corps; redesignated 9 July 1952 as the Army Reserve)

- Reorganized and redesignated 1 November 1950 as the 35th Signal Aviation Construction Battalion
- Reorganized and redesignated 25 April 1952 as the 35th Signal Construction Battalion
- Reorganized and redesignated 15 July 1953 as the 35th Signal Battalion
- Location of headquarters changed 7 February 1958 to Jersey City, New Jersey
- Inactivated 24 July 1959 at Jersey City, New Jersey
- Activated 16 November 1980 at Fort Allen, Puerto Rico
- 807th Signal Company Activated 1 November 2004 in support of Operation Iraqi Freedom and Operation Enduring freedom Fort Allen, Puerto Rico
- 35th SIG BN deployed as the 35th Integrated Theater Signal Battalion in support of OPERATION IRAQI FREEDOM on 8 July 2007. Fort Allen, Puerto Rico
- Reorganized 30 January 2011 as the 35th Expeditionary Signal Battalion (ESB)
- B Company, 35th Expeditionary Signal Battalion deployed to Iraq in support of OPERATION IRAQI FREEDOM on 23 September 2009. Aguadilla, Puerto Rico
- 35th Expeditionary Signal Battalion deployed to Kuwait in support of OPERATION ENDURING FREEDOM on 27 November 2014.
- A Company, 35th Expeditionary Signal Battalion, deployed to Kuwait in January 2022, returning in October 2022.
- B Company, 35th Expeditionary Signal Battalion, deployed to Poland in October 2021 and returning in August 2022.
- Reorganized 1 October 2022 into the 35th Expeditionary Signal Battalion - Enhanced (ESB-E)

== Honors ==
=== Campaign streamers ===
- World War II
  - Normandy (with arrowhead)
  - Northern France
  - Rhineland
  - Ardennes-Alsace
  - Central Europe

=== Decorations ===
- Meritorious Unit Commendation, streamer embroidered EUROPEAN THEATER (35th Sig Const Bn cited for period 7 Jun – 6 Aug 1944; GO 44 Hq, 1st Army, 16 Mar 1945)

== Subordinate units ==
- Headquarters and Headquarters Company (HHC), 35th Signal Battalion | Fort Allen, Puerto Rico
  - S1 – Personnel
  - S2/S3 – Operations, Plans, Training, Intelligence & Security
  - S4 – Logistics
  - Chaplain - Religious Services
  - 764 QM Det
- A Company | Yauco, Puerto Rico
- B Company | Aguadilla, Puerto Rico
- C Company | Puerto Nuevo
- 807th Signal Company - deactivated in 2007, Puerto Rico

== Coat of arms ==
Shield
Tenne, five flashes radiating from base point argent, on a chief of the last three telephone poles palewise connected by two wires throughout of the first.

Crest
That for the regiments and separate battalions of the Army Reserve: On a wreath of the colors (argent and tenne) the Lexington Minute Man proper. The statue of the Minute Man, Captain John Parker (H.H. Kitson, sculptor) stands on the Common in Lexington, Massachusetts.

Motto
We carry the word!

Orange and white are the colors of the Signal Corps. The telephone poles are symbolic of the construction activities of the organization. The five flashes commemorate the campaigns of World War II. Additionally, the flashes are indicative of messages carried over the wires. The three poles and five flashes are suggestive of the numerical designation of the organization.
