= William L. Carpenter =

American geologist (1844–1898)

William Lewis Carpenter
- Born: January 13, 1844; Dunkirk, New York, U.S.
- Died: July 10, 1898 (aged 54); Madison Barracks, Jefferson County, New York, U.S.
- Years active: 1861–1898
- Known for: U.S. Army Officer, naturalist and geologist

William Lewis Carpenter (January 13, 1844 – July 10, 1898) was an American naturalist and geologist who helped document the minerals and resources of the Black Hills of South Dakota which inadvertently led to the Great Sioux War of 1876.

== Early career ==
During the American Civil War he served as a midshipman in the U.S. Navy from 1861 to 1864. Wanting to see more action, he resigned from the Navy and joined the Army. He became a private in Battery "D" 2nd Artillery on July 29, 1864. He transferred to Battery "L" September 25, 1865. He served at the Siege of Petersburg, Virginia, and with the Army of the Potomac. He made corporal on September 28, 1866, and sergeant on January 29, 1867.

After publication of several scientific articles, ranging in topic from naturalist to geological surveys, he was appointed a second lieutenant in the U.S. Army on April 5, 1867. He was assigned to the 9th Infantry Regiment and encouraged to continue his scientific research on the frontier.

== Black Hills duty ==
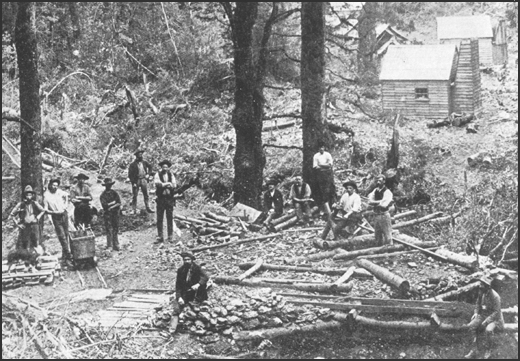
Gold miners in the Black Hills of South Dakota

In 1872–1874 as part of the 9th Infantry Regiment, Second Lieutenant Carpenter documented in a series of reports information of minerals, including gold, being seized from illegal miners and trespassers who were being ejected (See: Fort Laramie Treaty of 1868) from the Black Hills of South Dakota.

Carpenter was promoted to First Lieutenant for "exceptional duties" on December 31, 1873. His and other reports lead to Custer's 1874 Black Hills Expedition that set out on July 2, 1874, and returned on August, 30, 1874. Listed as "Bill Louis (sic) carpenter" he briefed naturalist George Bird Grinnell and others for that expedition.

In 1875, Lt. Carpenter, under Colonel Richard Irving Dodge became part of the 1875 Newton-Jenney Party which was a scientific expedition sponsored by the United States Geological Survey to map the Black Hills of South Dakota. Lt. W. Carpenter was commended for his "exceptional diligence and scientific assistance" and that he "contributed greatly" to the 1880 Black Hills Geological report.

In 1876, Carpenter was recorded as a participant in the Battle of the Rosebud in Montana Territory on June 17, 1876, as First Lieutenant of Company G, 9th Infantry, in which 1,200 cavalrymen under General George Crook supported by 300 Crow (Absaroke) and Shoshone warriors were attacked by about 1,500 Sioux and Cheyenne warriors under Chief Crazy Horse.

Carpenter was second in command of Company G, 9th Infantry Regiment who was documented as "awaiting reinforcements after the Battle of the Rosebud" on June 20, 1876.

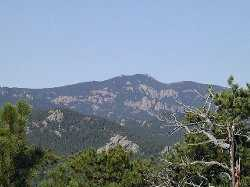
The Black Hills, South Dakota, United States

In 1877, under orders from General Philip Sheridan (later in 1883, Commanding General of the United States Army), Lt. William Lewis Carpenter made his final report on the "Geology and Natural History of the Big Horn Mountains." This report provided the economic reasons of the land and gold rush into the Black Hills of South Dakota 1873–1877, and was well received by the scientific community. Nominated by geologist W. P. Jenney, who encouraged him to go into academics, William L. Carpenter was elected a "Fellow" of the American Association for the Advancement of Science on September 4, 1877.

In 1880 he was enumerated in the U.S. federal census as a soldier in the unorganized territory of Nebraska. In 1882 he was listed as an officer of the Department of the Platte: "First Lieut. W. L. Carpenter, Ninth Infantry, Company B, Fort Niobrara."

His later duties included scientific collections and observations.

== Later career ==
9th Infantry coat of arms

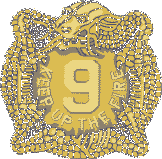
9th Infantry Distinctive Unit Insignia

Carpenter was promoted to captain in 1887.

In 1892, after 37 years of service in the Civil War and Indian Wars, the 9th Infantry Regiment was transferred to routine garrison duty in Madison Barracks, New York.

In Feb 1894, Captain Carpenter was at Madison Barracks where he was appointed to serve on an Army court-martial: "A general court-martial is appointed to meet at Madison Barracks, New York, on Feb. 21, 1894. Detail...William L. Carpenter, Ninth Infantry..." The 9th Infantry's official 1909 history includes several mentions of his service.

== Personal ==
Carpenter was the son of William Lewis Carpenter (Senior) (born July 17, 1813, in Batavia, New York, died in 1867) and Mamie Frances Bristol (born about 1813). He was the only son of three children. His immigrant ancestry is from the Rehoboth Carpenter family through William Carpenter (born 1605 in England).

On March 12, 1878, Carpenter married Ann Curtis Steever, who was born c. 1844 in New York. They had one child, a son, Marsh Steever Carpenter, born in 1883. In 1897 Carpenter joined the District of Columbia chapter of the Sons of the American Revolution. After his death from Bright's Disease on July 10, 1898, at Madison Barracks, his widow was appointed postmistress of Fort Myer, Arlington County, Virginia, in 1899 as cited in The Washington Post, May 24, 1899: "Mrs. W. L. Carpenter, widow of the late Capt. Carpenter, Ninth United States Infantry, has been appointed postmistress at Fort Myer, Va. The office was sought for by numerous candidates, but Fourth Assistant Postmaster General Bristow decided to give the plum to Mrs. Carpenter. Her late husband died at Madison Barracks, N.Y., on July 10, 1898, after an illness of several months. He had a long record of honorable service, extending over more than thirty years." A detailed obituary issued as a military order is reproduced on pp. 848–849 in "The Carpenter Memorial". He and his wife are interred in Arlington National Cemetery.
