= Brooks Memorial Hospital =

Hospital in Dunkirk, New York

Coordinates: 42°28′48″N 79°20′5″W

- Brooks-TLC Hospital System, affiliated with Kaleida Health

Geography
- Location: Dunkirk, Chautauqua County, New York, United States

Organization
- Network: Affiliated with Kaleida Health

Links
- Lists: Hospitals in New York State

Brooks Memorial Hospital is a hospital in Dunkirk, New York. It is managed by the Brooks-TLC Health System, and is affiliated with Kaleida Health.

== History ==
Brooks Memorial Hospital was named after Horatio G. Brooks and Julia A. Brooks. The children of Horatio and Julia had donated the family mansion to be used as a hospital. That is where Brooks Memorial Hospital was established. They opened the hospital in 1899, and ever since, it has served the community of Dunkirk and surrounding regions. In 2017, it was announced that Brooks Memorial Hospital would move to Pomfret, New York.. The plans to move seemed stagnant since 2017. In 2026, Brooks-TLC Hospital System, along with Kaleida Health broke ground on building a new facility in Fredonia, New York to be called "Northern Chautauqua Hospital"

== Brooks-TLC Hospital System ==
The Brooks-TLC Hospital System manages the Brooks Memorial Hospital in Dunkirk. Previously, it used to manage other hospitals such as Tri-County Memorial Hospital in Gowanda, and Lake Shore Hospital in Hanover.

Tri-County Memorial Hospital was a hospital located in Gowanda, New York. Tri-County Memorial Hospital served the Gowanda community for over 60 years as an acute care hospital facility, It closed in 2009 after a historic flash flood across the region, leading it to be demolished in 2011.

Lake Shore Hospital was a hospital located in Hanover, New York. It opened in 1965, than merged with Tri-County Memorial Hospital in Gowanda in 2002 to create the TLC Health System. It underwent years of financial strain before closing for good in 2020.
