= 191st Regional Support Group =

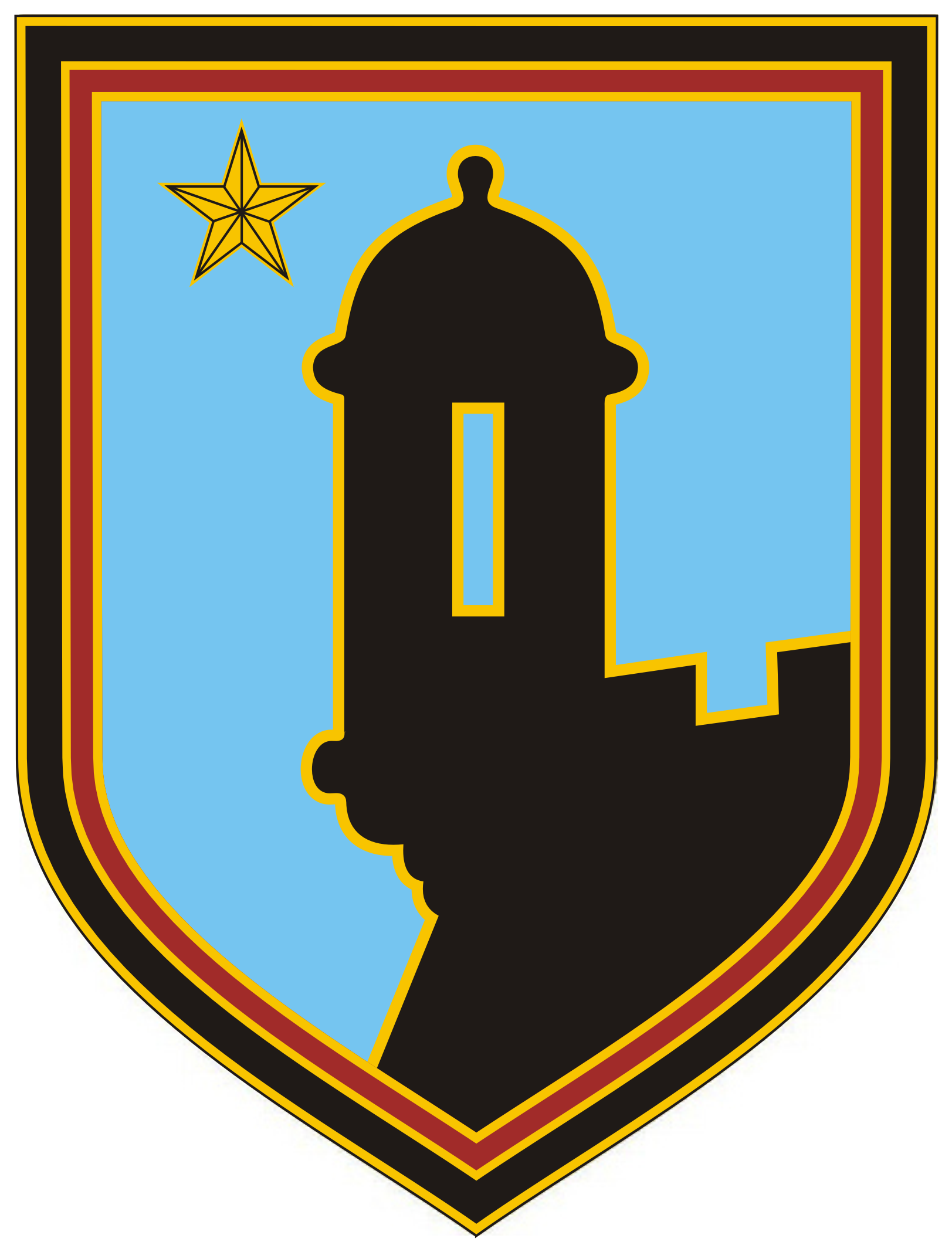
- Active: 2008 - present
- Country: United States
- Branch: United States Army National Guard
- Type: Sustainment
- Size: Brigade
- Part of: Puerto Rico Army National Guard
- Garrison/HQ: Fort Allen
- Mottos: Domestic and Global Support

Commanders
- Current commander: Col. Arnold Rivera-Sanchez
- Command Sergeant Major: CSM Cruz Ortolaza

Insignia
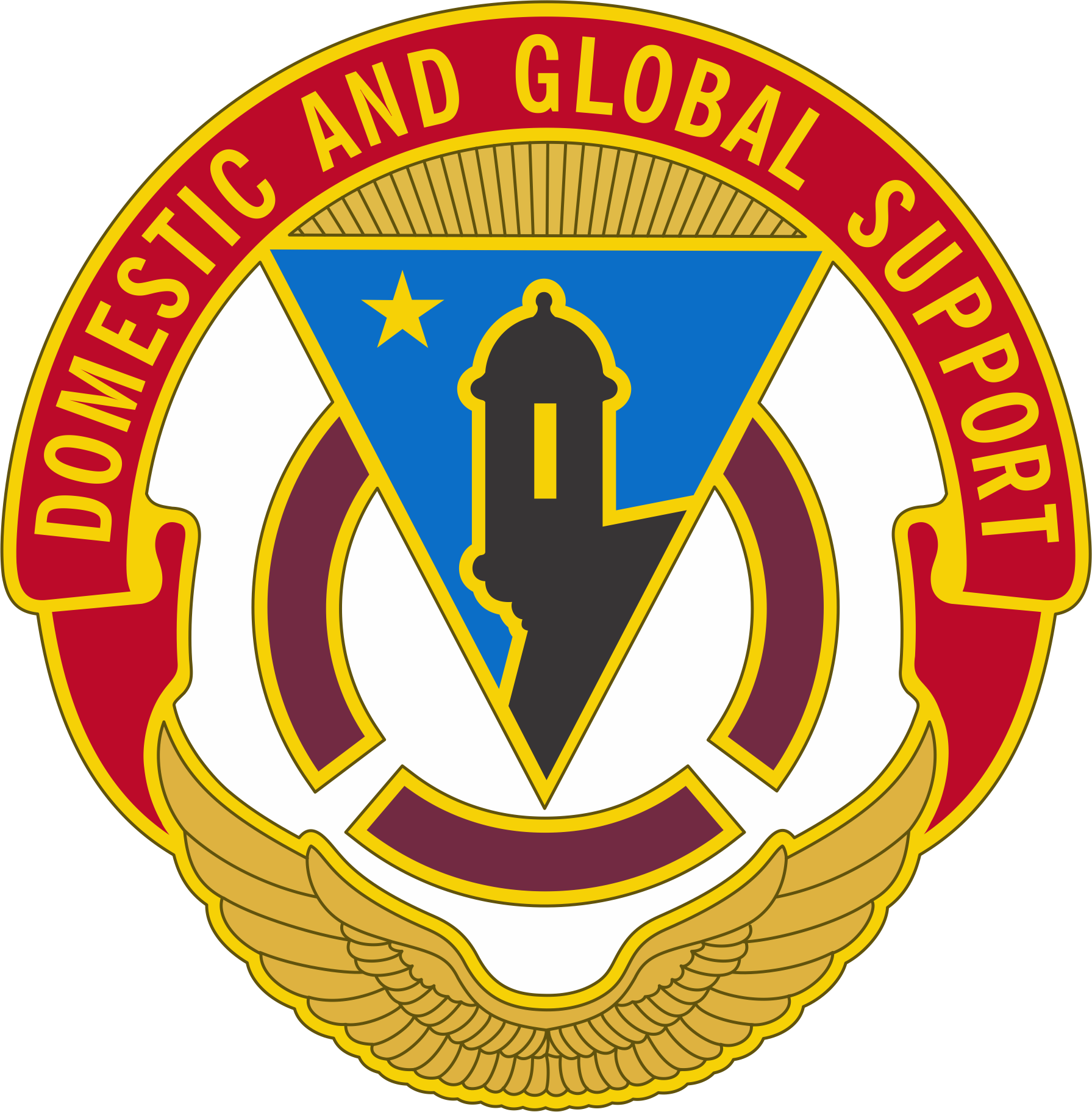
- Identification symbol

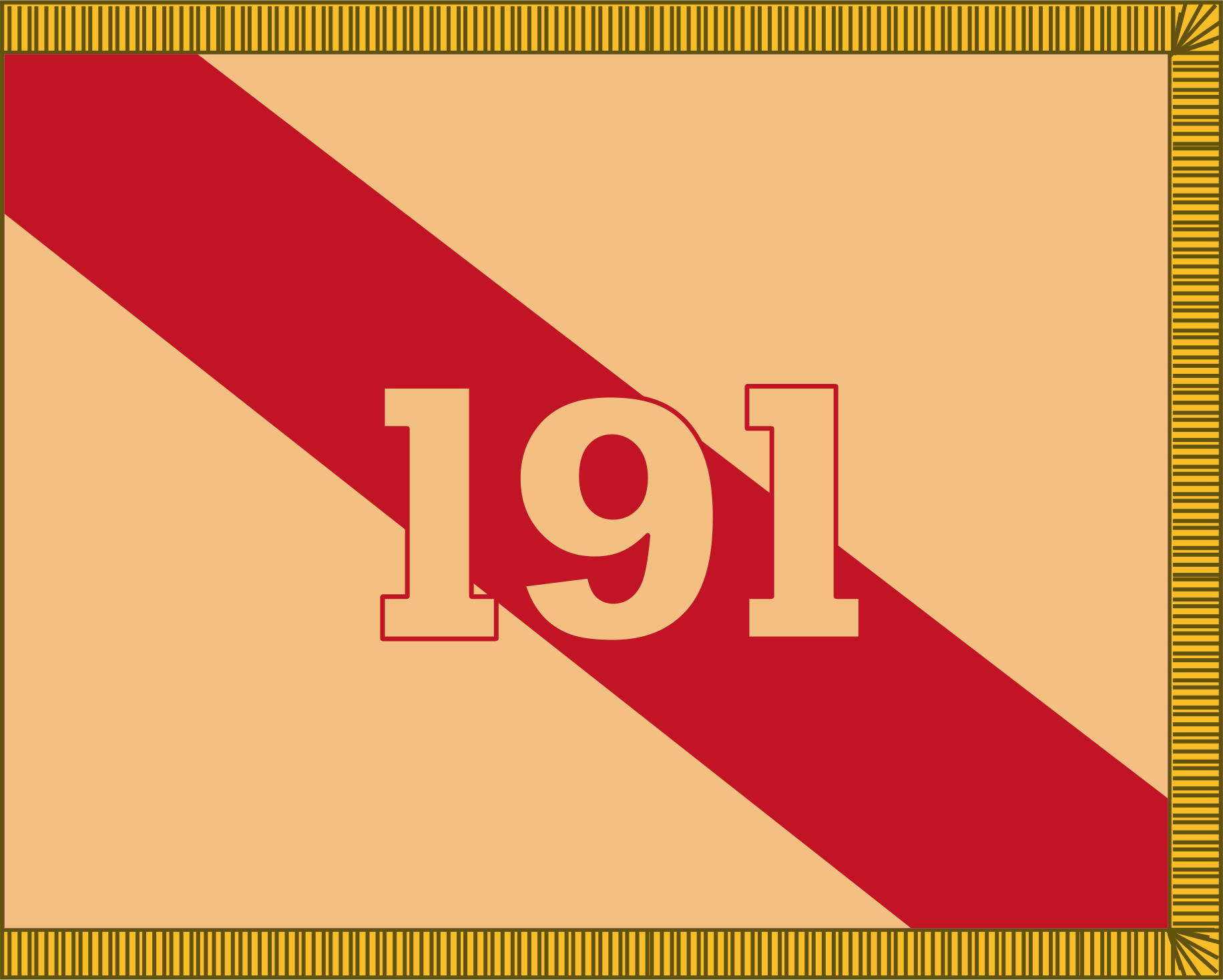
- 191st Regional Support Group Flag

191st Regional Support Group (191st RSG) is a regional support group of the Puerto Rico Army National Guard. The unit's federal (MTOE/TDA) mission is '..Deploys to provide contingency and expeditionary Base Operations Support, with responsibilities for managing facilities, providing administrative and logistical support of soldier services, and ensuring the security of personnel and facilities on a base camp.'

The unit has been in command of the Joint Task Force Guantanamo Headquarters and Headquarters Company since its arrival in December 2008. Their mission while deployed is expansive, ranging from service member safety to housing issues. In addition to its far-reaching responsibilities, the group has also had to learn to work with and rely on one another, since the unit was formed shortly before deploying.

The 191st Regional Support Group most notable deployment occurred from October 2021 to July 2022 in Central and Eastern Europe under Operation Atlantic Resolve, where it supported over 14,000 troops across 14 forward operating sites in Poland, Lithuania, and Latvia, while adapting to heightened demands following Russia's February 2022 invasion of Ukraine.

== Organization ==
- 191st Regional Support Group, at Fort Allen
  - Headquarters and Headquarters Company, 191st Regional Support Group, at Fort Allen
  - 1930th Support Detachment (Contracting Team)
  - 292nd Combat Sustainment Support Battalion
    - Headquarters and Headquarters Company, 292nd Combat Sustainment Support Battalion
    - 219th Quartermaster Detachment (Tactical Water Distribution Team) (Hoseline)
    - 714th Quartermaster Company (Water Purification and Distribution)
    - 755th Transportation Company (Medium Truck) (Cargo)
    - 770th Transportation Company (Light-Medium Truck), at Camp Santiago Joint Training Center
    - 840th Ordnance Company (Classification and Inspection Company), at Fort Allen
  - 3678th Combat Sustainment Support Battalion
    - Headquarters and Headquarters Company, 3678th Combat Sustainment Support Battalion
    - 105th Quartermaster Company (Water Purification and Distribution)
    - 162nd Quartermaster Company (Water Purification and Distribution)
    - 783rd Ordnance Company (Support Maintenance)
    - 1243rd Transportation Company (Light-Medium Truck)
    - 1473rd Quartermaster Company (Supply)

== Insignia ==
Shoulder Sleeve insignia is a Sea Blue shield with a black and red border it contains a gold star in the upper left and in the center the El Morro fortress. The insignia was approved on 3 April 2012.

The Distinctive Unit Insignia is a enamel pin with a down pointing blue triangle with a small gold star and the Elm Morro fortress in it. Below the triangle is a segmented circle in brick red. Below the circle is a pair of golden wings. Above the triangle is a soldier red scroll with the motto "Domestic and Global Support."
