= Chadwick Bay =

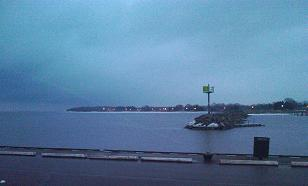
- Chadwick Bay – January 2010

- Location within New York
- Location: Dunkirk, New York
- Coordinates: 42.490613°N 79.338099°W
- Islands: none

Chadwick Bay is the name of a bay located in Dunkirk, New York, on Lake Erie. It is also known as Dunkirk Harbor and also Garnsey's Bay.

The bay takes its name from Solomon Chadwick who first immigrated to the area from Weston, Massachusetts, in 1810. The bay has become a popular symbol of the local area as many businesses, charities, and government organizations have attached the name Chadwick Bay to their products and or services.
