= Dunkirk, New York =

Dunkirk, New York Chadwicks Bay, Ganadawao
- City
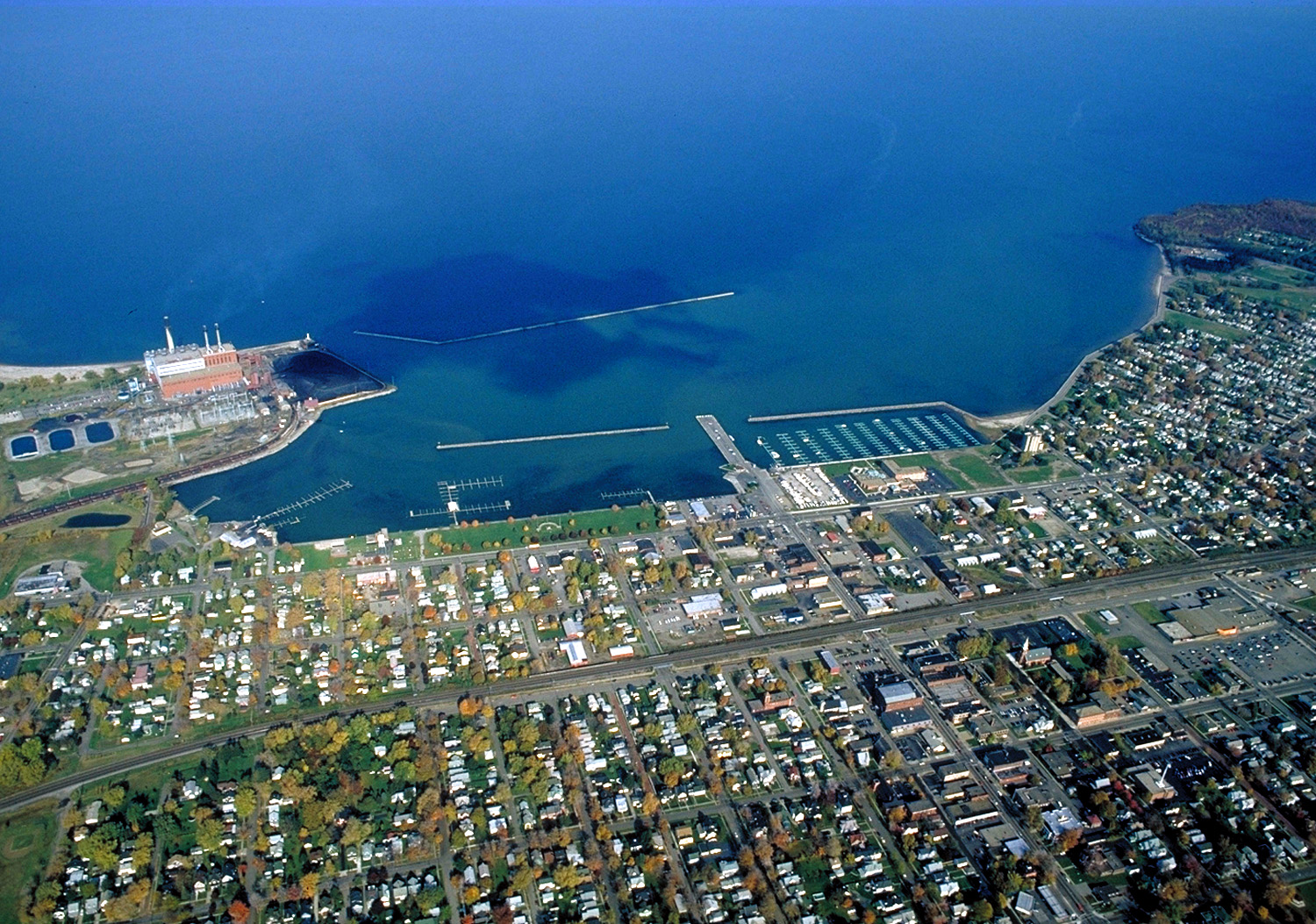
- Aerial view of Dunkirk, facing north over Lake Erie

- Location of Dunkirk in New York Dunkirk (the United States)
- Coordinates: 42°28′46″N 79°20′02″W
- Country: United States
- State: New York
- County: Chautauqua
- Established: 1880 (officially incorporated)

Government
  - Type: Mayor-Council
  - Mayor: Kate Wdowiasz (D)
  - Common Council: Members: • At-Large: Nick Weiser (D); • W1: Natalie Luczkowiak (D); • W2: Abigail Yerico (R); • W3: James Stoyle (R); • W4: Nancy Nichols (R)

Area
  - Total: 4.57 sq mi (11.83 km^{2})
  - Land: 4.54 sq mi (11.77 km^{2})
  - Water: 0.023 sq mi (0.06 km^{2})
- Elevation: 617 ft (188 m)

Population (2020)
  - Total: 12,743
  - Density: 2,803.9/sq mi (1,082.59/km^{2})
- ZIP Codes: 14048; 14166 (PO box)
- Area code: 716
- FIPS code: 36-013-21105
- Website: cityofdunkirk.com

Dunkirk is a city in Chautauqua County, New York, United States. It was settled around 1805 and incorporated in 1880. The population was 12,743 as of the 2020 census. Dunkirk is bordered on the north by Lake Erie. It shares a border with the village of Fredonia to the south, and with the town of Dunkirk to the east and west. Dunkirk is the westernmost city in the state of New York.

== History ==
The European-American demarcation and settlement of Chadwick Bay began in 1826. and later the town was named after Dunkirk in France

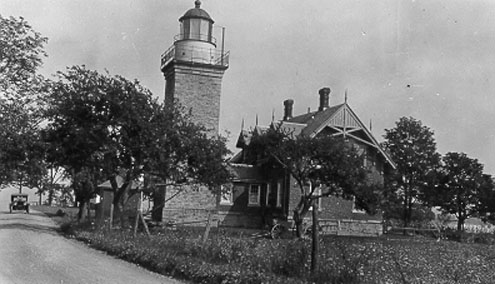
Point Gratiot Lighthouse on Lake Erie in Dunkirk.

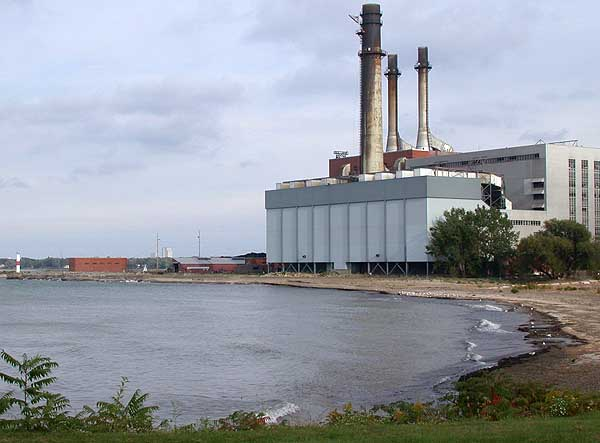
NRG Energy Power plant along Lake Erie in Dunkirk, shuttered since 2016.

The Dunkirk Lighthouse at Point Gratiot was built soon after and still stands. Dunkirk served as a minor railroad hub and steamship port on Lake Erie into the early 1900s. Both freight and passenger ships traveled the lakes.

The Chautauqua County Fair, which had been held sporadically over the years starting in 1821, was first held regularly in Dunkirk in 1881 on land acquired for its permanent use.

A major employer in Dunkirk in the second half of the 19th century was Brooks Locomotive Works, founded in 1869 by Horatio G. Brooks. The Brooks plant built almost 4,000 steam locomotives, for which they won several awards at international exhibitions, and a few of their locomotives were hailed as the fastest and largest locomotives in the world. Brooks Locomotive Works was merged into American Locomotive Company in 1901. The homestead of Horatio G. Brooks became the Brooks Memorial Hospital following a donation by Brooks's daughter in 1898.

The city thrived as a steel town for Roebling and others through the 1950s. In addition, it was a manufacturing leader with Plymouth Tube and Ralston Purina. Its coal-burning Niagara Mohawk Power Corporation plant provided power for the region. The plant was mothballed in 2016, negatively impacting Dunkirk's tax base. NRG Energy acquired the plant and proceeded with plans to convert it from coal-burning to run on natural gas. Since the 1970s, population has declined following a regional drop in manufacturing as the steel industry and other restructured. Overall employment has declined in the area.

Dunkirk gained international recognition in 1946 for the Dunkirk-to-Dunkerque campaign. It was a humanitarian assistance program for its namesake and sister city, Dunkerque, France, which had been devastated in World War II. Dunkirk-to-Dunkerque became the model for similar relief efforts in cities elsewhere in the United States.

Beginning in the 1980s, the city refocused its economic efforts on revitalizing its pier and fishing, to improve the quality of life for residents and attract more tourists. In addition, in 2016 it attracted a high-tech drug manufacturing project as part of business related to the state project of area investment called the "Buffalo Billion."

In 2016, Willie Rosas, a former law enforcement officer, became the first Hispanic to be elected mayor in the State of New York.

== Geography ==
Dunkirk lies on the southeastern shore of Lake Erie and is 45 miles (72 km) southwest of Buffalo.

According to the United States Census Bureau, the city has an area of 4.6 square miles (11.8 km^{2}), of which 4.5 square miles (11.7 km^{2}) is land and 0.04 square miles (0.1 km^{2}), or 1.10%, is water.

=== Climate ===
According to the Köppen climate classification system using 1991-2020 data, Dunkirk has an oceanic climate (Cfb) closely bordering on both a humid subtropical climate (Cfa) and a humid continental climate (Dfa/Dfb), owing to the significant moderating influence of Lake Erie that prevails especially during the summer months. The plant hardiness zone is 7a, accommodating for plants that can withstand an average minimum air temperature between 0 °F (−18 °C) and 5 °F (−15 °C).

Climate data for Chautauqua County/Dunkirk Airport, 1991–2020 normals, extremes 1945–1953, 1997–present
Month	Jan	Feb	Mar	Apr	May	Jun	Jul	Aug	Sep	Oct	Nov	Dec	Year
Record high °F (°C)	72 (22)	74 (23)	81 (27)	86 (30)	89 (32)	94 (34)	99 (37)	96 (36)	96 (36)	87 (31)	85 (29)	71 (22)	99 (37)
Mean maximum °F (°C)	58.8 (14.9)	58.0 (14.4)	67.7 (19.8)	79.3 (26.3)	84.2 (29.0)	89.2 (31.8)	89.5 (31.9)	88.8 (31.6)	86.3 (30.2)	79.4 (26.3)	68.7 (20.4)	59.6 (15.3)	91.7 (33.2)
Mean daily maximum °F (°C)	34.1 (1.2)	35.1 (1.7)	42.7 (5.9)	55.4 (13.0)	67.1 (19.5)	76.0 (24.4)	80.0 (26.7)	78.6 (25.9)	72.2 (22.3)	61.0 (16.1)	49.2 (9.6)	39.0 (3.9)	57.5 (14.2)
Daily mean °F (°C)	26.7 (−2.9)	27.0 (−2.8)	34.0 (1.1)	45.2 (7.3)	56.6 (13.7)	66.1 (18.9)	70.7 (21.5)	69.3 (20.7)	62.8 (17.1)	52.2 (11.2)	41.7 (5.4)	32.8 (0.4)	48.8 (9.3)
Mean daily minimum °F (°C)	19.4 (−7.0)	18.9 (−7.3)	25.3 (−3.7)	34.9 (1.6)	46.2 (7.9)	56.2 (13.4)	61.4 (16.3)	60.1 (15.6)	53.4 (11.9)	43.5 (6.4)	34.3 (1.3)	26.6 (−3.0)	40.0 (4.5)
Mean minimum °F (°C)	−1.2 (−18.4)	0.0 (−17.8)	7.5 (−13.6)	23.1 (−4.9)	31.9 (−0.1)	43.3 (6.3)	49.8 (9.9)	48.6 (9.2)	39.7 (4.3)	29.1 (−1.6)	20.6 (−6.3)	11.1 (−11.6)	−5.1 (−20.6)
Record low °F (°C)	−16 (−27)	−28 (−33)	−11 (−24)	18 (−8)	27 (−3)	39 (4)	45 (7)	43 (6)	32 (0)	22 (−6)	3 (−16)	−12 (−24)	−28 (−33)
Average precipitation inches (mm)	1.66 (42)	1.21 (31)	1.73 (44)	2.78 (71)	3.08 (78)	3.70 (94)	3.65 (93)	3.30 (84)	3.55 (90)	3.86 (98)	3.09 (78)	2.38 (60)	33.99 (863)
Average precipitation days (≥ 0.01 in)	13.5	10.5	11.1	13.0	12.2	11.9	10.9	11.2	11.0	14.7	13.2	15.4	148.6
Source 1: NOAA
Source 2: National Weather Service

== Demographics ==
Historical population
Census	Pop.	Note	%±
1870	5,231		—
1880	7,248		38.6%
1890	9,416		29.9%
1900	11,616		23.4%
1910	17,221		48.3%
1920	19,336		12.3%
1930	17,802		−7.9%
1940	17,713		−0.5%
1950	18,007		1.7%
1960	18,205		1.1%
1970	16,855		−7.4%
1980	15,310		−9.2%
1990	13,989		−8.6%
2000	13,131		−6.1%
2010	12,563		−4.3%
2020	12,743		1.4%
U.S. Decennial Census

=== 2020 census ===
As of the 2020 census, Dunkirk had a population of 12,743. The median age was 39.9 years. 22.5% of residents were under the age of 18 and 18.3% of residents were 65 years of age or older. For every 100 females there were 96.2 males, and for every 100 females age 18 and over there were 93.8 males age 18 and over.

99.4% of residents lived in urban areas, while 0.6% lived in rural areas.

There were 5,431 households in Dunkirk, of which 27.0% had children under the age of 18 living in them. Of all households, 31.4% were married-couple households, 23.6% were households with a male householder and no spouse or partner present, and 34.4% were households with a female householder and no spouse or partner present. About 36.4% of all households were made up of individuals and 14.8% had someone living alone who was 65 years of age or older.

There were 6,119 housing units, of which 11.2% were vacant. The homeowner vacancy rate was 1.5% and the rental vacancy rate was 6.9%.

Racial composition as of the 2020 census
Race	Number	Percent
White	8,120	63.7%
Black or African American	818	6.4%
American Indian and Alaska Native	139	1.1%
Asian	63	0.5%
Native Hawaiian and Other Pacific Islander	3	0.0%
Some other race	1,735	13.6%
Two or more races	1,865	14.6%
Hispanic or Latino (of any race)	4,515	35.4%

=== 2010 census ===
As of the 2010 census, there were 12,563 people, 5,477 households, and 3,690 families residing in the city. The population density was 2,774.6 people per square mile (1,119.2 per km^{2}). There were 6,071 housing units at an average density of 1,340.6 per square mile (517.4 per km^{2}). The city's racial makeup of the city was 65.70% White, 5.1% Black or African American, 0.52% Native American, 0.50 Asian, 0.02% Pacific Islander, 9.14% from other races, and 1.8% from two or more races. Hispanic or Latino of any race were 26.40% of the population.

There were 5,477 households, out of which 28.2% had children under the age of 18 living with them, 39.4% were married couples living together, 16.7% had a female householder with no husband present, and 39.1% were non-families. 33.4% of all households were made up of individuals, and 16.0% had someone living alone who was 65 years of age or older. The average household size was 2.37 and the average family size was 3.02.

In the city, the population was spread out, with 25.3% under the age of 18, 9.0% from 18 to 24, 26.5% from 25 to 44, 21.5% from 45 to 64, and 17.6% who were 65 years of age or older. The median age was 37 years. For every 100 females, there were 90.9 males. For every 100 females age 18 and over, there were 85.8 males.

The median income for a household in the city was $28,313, and the median income for a family was $35,058. Males had a median income of $29,462 versus $21,682 for females. The per capita income for the city was $15,482. About 18.5% of families and 22.3% of the population were below the poverty line, including 38.0% of those under age 18 and 11.1% of those age 65 or over.

== Education ==
- Dunkirk High School, home of the Marauders, is part of the public Dunkirk City School District.
- Northern Chautauqua Catholic School is a K-8th grade school under the Roman Catholic Diocese of Buffalo.

== Media ==
- The Observer newspaper is published in Dunkirk.
- WDOE AM radio station in Dunkirk, co-owned with Fredonia FM sister station, WBKX.

== Infrastructure ==
=== Transportation ===
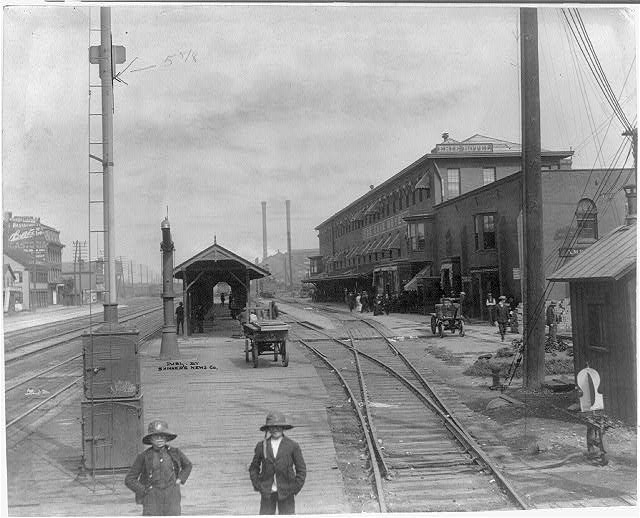
Union Depot, Dunkirk, between c. 1890 and c. 1900

The Chautauqua County/Dunkirk Airport, in the town of Dunkirk, provides training facilities and charter services.

Freight railroad service in Dunkirk is provided by CSX Transportation (via the Buffalo-Cleveland-Willard (Ohio)-Chicago Main Line) and Norfolk Southern Railway (Buffalo-Cleveland-Fort Wayne-Chicago Main Line). The Lake Shore Limited daily Amtrak passenger train passes through the city but does not stop. Erie Railroad and New York Central trains stopped at one station. Nickel Plate and Pennsylvania Railroad trains stopped at another station. As recently as 1968 the New York Central operated a Buffalo-Chicago daytime train, #51, the former Empire State Express, that made a stop westbound in Dunkirk. Two other daily trains eastbound stopped in Dunkirk, #64 and #90, the former Chicagoan. In the late 1990s Amtrak considered adding the city as a stop between Buffalo and Erie. Dunkirk was listed as a stop with service "to commence on a date to be announced" on several timetables, but the stop was never added.

The New York State Thruway (Interstate 90) passes through the southern edge of the city, with access from Exit 59 (NY Route 60) just east of the city limits. The Thruway leads northeast 42 miles (68 km) to the outskirts of Buffalo and southwest 28 miles (45 km) to the Pennsylvania border. New York State Route 5 runs through the center of the city, leading northeast 9 miles (14 km) to Silver Creek and southwest 18 miles (29 km) to Westfield. New York State Route 60 runs from Dunkirk south, heading toward Jamestown, New York.

=== Public safety ===
The city of Dunkirk has its own police force and a paid fire department with three stations in the city.

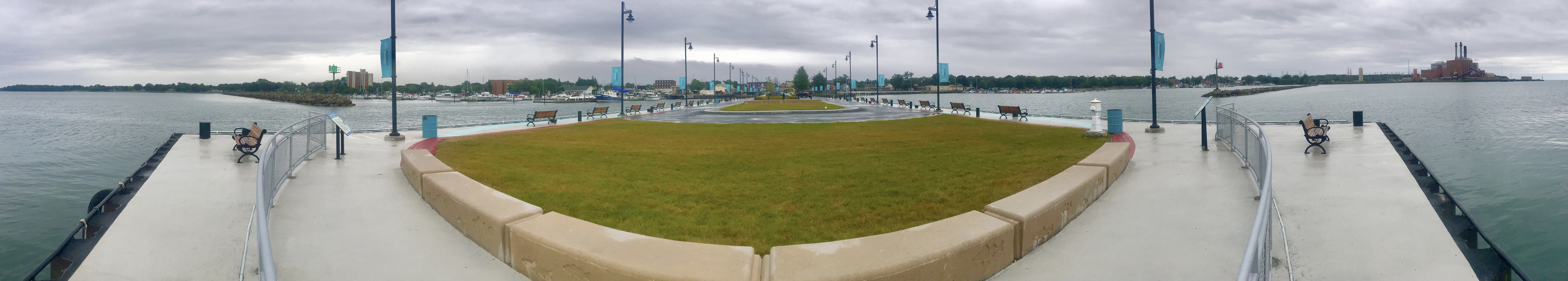
Dunkirk City Pier

== Notable people ==
- Samuel Hopkins Adams, author
- Edna A. Boorady, lawyer and diplomat
- Mark Brazill, creator of That '70s Show
- Horatio G. Brooks founder of Brooks Locomotive Works
- June Card, operatic soprano and stage director
- William L. Carpenter, U.S. Army officer, geologist
- Richard H. Cosgriff, Union Army soldier who received the Medal of Honor
- Dave Criscione, retired Major League Baseball catcher
- Celestine Damiano, former Bishop of Camden
- Katharine Bement Davis, social reformer
- Mike DiMuro, MLB umpire
- Ray DiMuro, retired MLB umpire
- Francis S. Edwards, former US congressman
- Mike Friedman, pro-racing cyclist
- Daniel G. Garnsey, former US congressman
- Dave Graf, retired NFL linebacker
- Grasshopper, guitarist and songwriter for seminal alternative rock band Mercury Rev
- Ross Graves, former New York politician
- Chad Green, former minor league baseball player
- H. B. Halicki, director of Gone in 60 Seconds and The Junkman; born in Dunkirk
- Norm Hitzges, host on Sportsradio 1310 AM and 96.7 FM the Ticket in the Dallas-Fort-Worth area and Texas Radio Hall of Famer
- Thomas Horan, a Medal of Honor Recipient at the battle of Gettysburg (1863) during the Civil War, was born in Dunkirk in 1839 and died 1902. His grave is at Saint Mary's Cemetery in Dunkirk.
- Jerry Interval, portrait photographer
- Teresa Jordan, geologist at Cornell University
- Richard P. Klocko, Air Force lieutenant general, command pilot, director of Defense Communications Agency
- John T. McDonough, former Secretary of State of New York
- Sean Patrick McGraw, country music artist
- Jim McGuire, former MLB player
- Todd Alessi, baseball player, 1988 State Championship MVP
- Cindy Miller, pro golfer
- Van Miller, play-by-play announcer for the Buffalo Bills and WIVB-TV sportscaster
- Chris Poland, former guitarist of thrash metal band Megadeth
- Gar Samuelson, former drummer of thrash metal band Megadeth
- William J. Scheyer, Major general in the Marine Corps during World War II
- Murray Shelton, member of the College Football Hall of Fame
- Wendy Corsi Staub, New York Times best selling author
- Grace Hyde Trine, writer, lecturer, dramatic reader
- Elisha Ward, former New York state senator
- Cory Wells, One of three lead singers of the band Three Dog Night

== See also ==
- Chadwick Bay
- Universal Stainless
