= WBKX =

Coordinates: 42.367°N 79.386°W

- Fredonia, New York; United States
- Broadcast area: Western New York; Jamestown NY area
- Frequency: 96.5 MHz
- Branding: "Kix Country 96.5 and 100.3"

Programming
- Format: Country
- Affiliations: Today's Best Country; ABC Radio; Buffalo Bills Radio Network

Ownership
- Owner: Chadwick Bay Broadcasting
- Sister stations: WDOE

History
- First air date: pre-1989
- Former call signs: WCQA (to 2000)
- Call sign meaning: W B KiX

Technical information
- Licensing authority: FCC
- Class: WBKX: A W262BX: D
- ERP: WBKX: 1,400 watts W262BX: 250 watts
- HAAT: WBKX: 209 meters W262BX: -10 meters
- Translator: 100.3 MHz (W262BX)

Links
- Public license information: Public file; LMS
- Website: wbkxcountry.com

WBKX (96.5 FM) is a radio station that is based in Dunkirk, New York and also broadcasts at 100.3 FM (via translator W262BX) in Jamestown, New York. The station, along with WDOE, is owned by Alan Bishop.

The station broadcasts a country music format at 96.5 MHz in Dunkirk and 100.3 MHz in Jamestown and is branded as "Kix Country." The station broadcasts a local morning show hosted by Tony Lynn. Other dayparts use the Local Radio Network 24-hour country format.

The station was originally known as WCQA, 96.5 "The Bull," also under a country format. Said format was adopted after the demise of the station's longtime country outlet, WBUZ. (Shortly before WBUZ's end, WCQA submitted a petition to the Federal Communications Commission (FCC) to move to the Jamestown, New York suburb of Falconer; however, it was rescinded when WBUZ failed, leaving Dunkirk with WCQA as the lone commercial radio station.) However, after 2000, the station shifted to a satellite adult contemporary format from ABC and changed their branding to "96 Kix". After a few years, and numerous complaints, WBKX decided to revert to the country format in 2006. In 2009, WBKX began simulcasting at 100.3 FM to make a big competition in Jamestown competing with WHUG "My Country 101.9".
