= Brooks Locomotive Works =

American manufacturer (1869–1901)

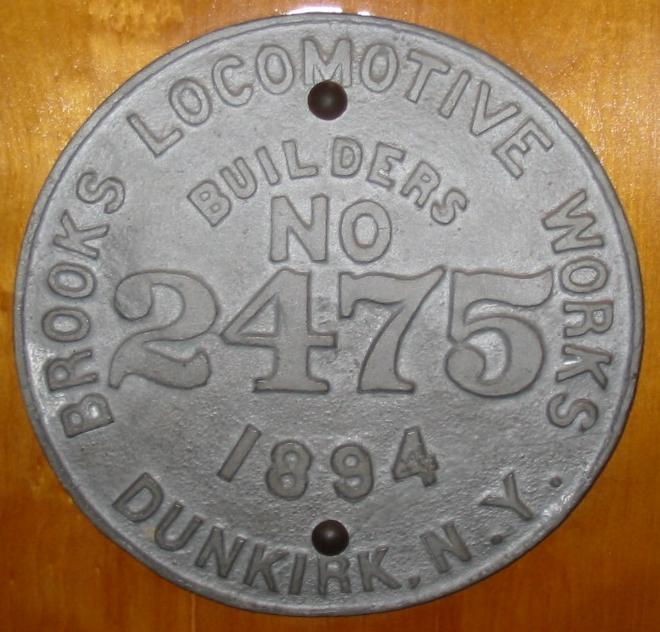
- Builder's plate from Brooks Locomotive Works, 1894
- Industry: Rail transport
- Founded: November 13, 1869
- Founders: Horatio G. Brooks
- Defunct: 1901
- Fate: Merged
- Successor: American Locomotive Company
- Headquarters: Dunkirk, New York, United States
- Products: Steam locomotives and rolling stock, cotton machinery

The Brooks Locomotive Works manufactured railroad steam locomotives and freight cars from 1869 through its merger into the American Locomotive Company (ALCO) in 1901.

== History ==
When the New York and Erie Railroad (NY&E) relocated its shops facilities from Dunkirk, New York, to Buffalo in 1869, Dunkirk lost its largest employer. Coming to the city's rescue was Horatio G. Brooks (1828–1887), the former chief engineer of the NY&E who was at the controls of the first train into Dunkirk in 1851. In 1869, Brooks leased the Dunkirk shops facility from the NY&E and formed the Brooks Locomotive Works. The new company officially opened on November 13, 1869. The company's first steam locomotive was completed the following month as part of an order for the NY&E, the company's first customer.

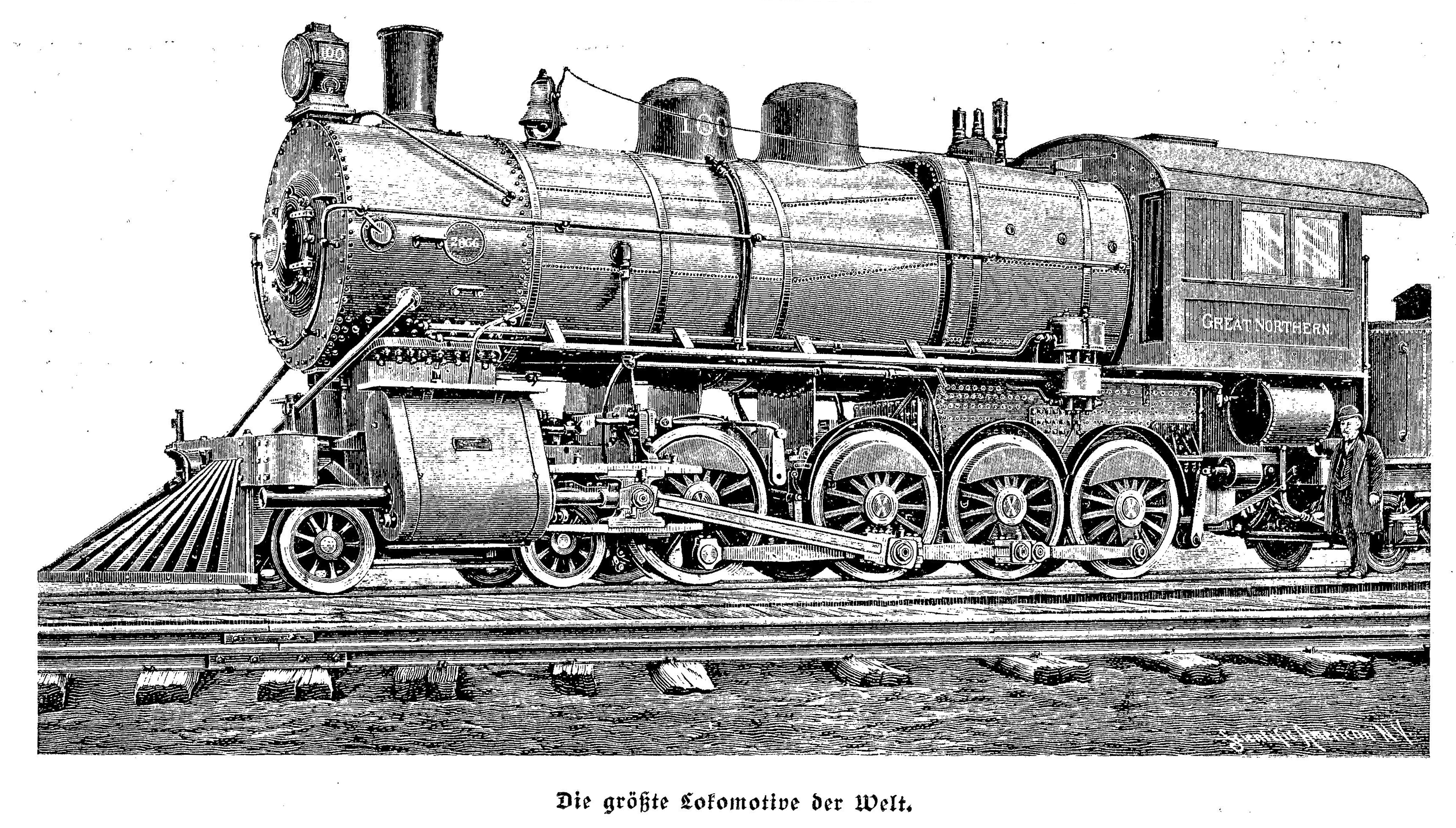
Brooks Locomotive Works locomotive for Great Northern Railway (1899)

Within a few of years of opening Brooks was producing as many as seven new locomotives per month, compared to one per month while the facility was controlled by the NY&E. Brooks built locomotives for nearly all of the major railroads of the time, producing 37 new locomotives in its first year and 43 new locomotives in its second year of operations.

After the financial crisis of 1873, orders for new equipment dropped off, but Brooks was able to recover enough business to avoid bankruptcy. Brooks locomotives were displayed a few years later at the National Railway Appliance Exhibition in Chicago, where they were judged the Best in Show. Brooks locomotives were also favorably received and awarded at the World's Columbian Exposition in 1893.

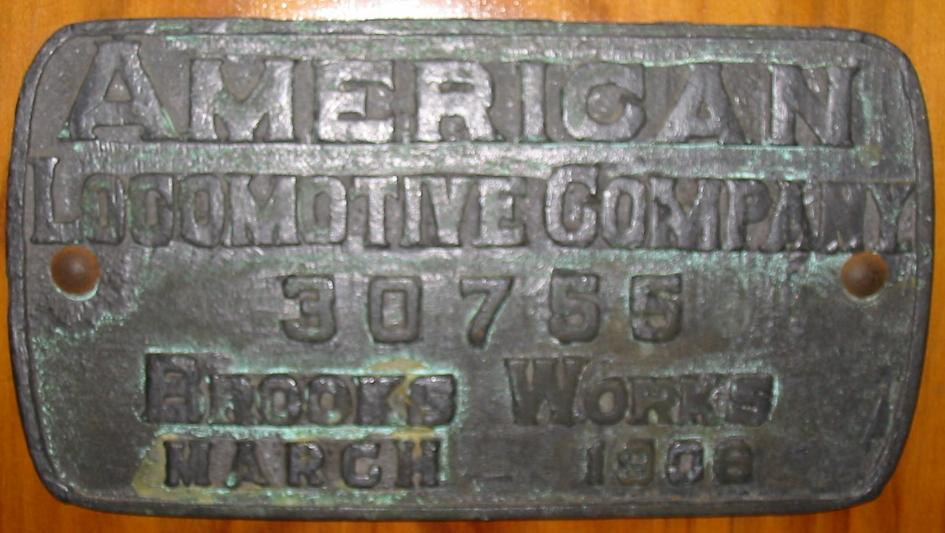
Builder's plate from ALCO-Brooks locomotive, 1906

The 1890s brought another period of depressed sales following another financial crisis. The company produced 226 new locomotives in 1891, but only 90 new locomotives in 1894. The company briefly gained some positive publicity in 1895 when one of its locomotives held the speed record for rail vehicles; a Brooks-built locomotive was driven at 92.3 mph (149 km/h) on the Lake Shore and Michigan Southern Railway on October 24, 1895. Brooks also gained positive publicity for building some exceptionally large locomotives at the end of the 19th century, including locomotives for both Great Northern Railway and Illinois Central Railroad that were hailed as being the largest in the world. However Brooks was not able to recover business as easily as the previous downturn and, following brief participation in a widespread strike by machinists in May, the company was merged with several other manufacturers in 1901 to form the American Locomotive Company. The last Brooks locomotive, serial number 3883, built for the Lake Shore Railroad, was completed on June 22, 1901.

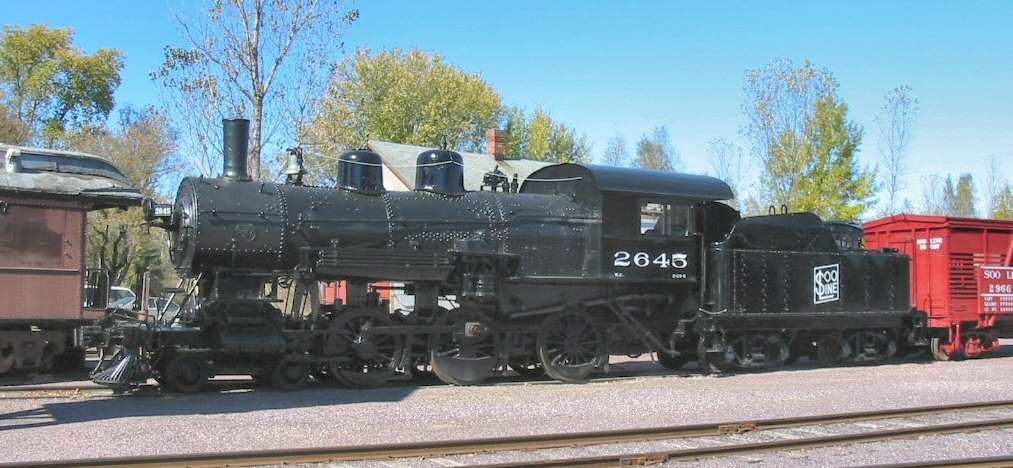
Brooks s/n 3687, Soo Line 2645 preserved at the Mid-Continent Railway Museum, North Freedom, WI.

Horatio Brooks died in April 1887; he was succeeded as president of the company by his son-in-law, Edward Nichols. Nichols died on January 7, 1892, and was succeeded by then vice president Marshall L. Hinman. Hinman resigned from the presidency in December 1896 to be succeeded by another of H.G. Brooks's sons-in-law, Frederick H. Stevens. Stevens led the company until the merger with Alco in 1901.

Following the merger, the Brooks plant built one of the first orders booked by ALCO, consisting of fifteen 2-8-0 locomotives for Mexican Central Railroad. ALCO produced locomotives at this facility until 1934 when the shop was renamed ALCO Thermal Products Division. Locomotives produced at the former Brooks plant after ALCO's formation came to be known as ALCO-Brooks locomotives.

Although new locomotives were no longer being produced at the former Brooks shops in Dunkirk, shop forces were kept busy for some time building spare parts for ALCO locomotives. Production had shifted from locomotives to heat exchangers, high-pressure vessels and pipes of all sizes.

After World War II, production at the Dunkirk plant never got back to its prewar levels. ALCO finally closed the facility in 1962.

== Timeline ==
- November 11, 1869: Horatio Brooks leases the shops facility in Dunkirk and officially opens the Brooks Locomotive Works
- 1883: Brooks locomotives are named the Best in Show locomotives at the National Railway Appliance Exhibition in Chicago.
- February 22, 1884: Brooks completes its 1,000th new locomotive.
- November 30, 1891: Brooks completes its 2,000th new locomotive.
- July 23, 1898: Brooks completes its 3,000th new locomotive.
- 1901: Brooks and several other locomotive manufacturers are merged into the American Locomotive Company
- 1934: New locomotive construction at the Brooks plant ends as the plant is renamed ALCO Thermal Products Division.
- 1962: ALCO closes the former Brooks plant in Dunkirk, laying off the remaining 750 laborers at the facility.

== Preserved Brooks locomotives ==
Brooks Locomotive Works sold locomotives to all of the major railroads of the late 19th century. Following is a partial list (in serial number order) of Brooks-built locomotives that have been preserved, engines built from 1901 onwards were post-ALCO merger.

Serial number	Wheel arrangement (Whyte notation)	Build date	Operational owner(s)	Disposition
494	2-6-0	January 1881	Utah and Northern Railway 23, then 80; Pacific and Arctic Railway and Navigation Company 51	Whitehorse, Yukon Territory, Canada
522	2-6-0	April 1881	Klondike Mines Railway 1	Minto Park, Dawson City, Yukon Territory, Canada
567	2-6-0	August 1881	Utah and Northern Railway 37, then 94, White Pass and Yukon Route 52	Skagway, Alaska
1535	2-6-0	May 1889	Quincy & Torch Lake Railroad 1 Thomas F. Mason	Quincy Mine, Hancock, Michigan
2475	2-6-0	October 1894	Quincy & Torch Lake Railroad 3	Huckleberry Railroad, Flint, Michigan
2725	0-4-0	1896	Transvaal & Delgoa Bay Collieries Ltd, then the City of Cape Town	Static display in Choo Choo Park, Cape Town, South Africa.
2779	4-4-2T	1897	Bisai Railway 1, Nagoya Railroad 1	Museum Meiji-mura, Inuyama, Aichi, Japan
2951	2-8-0	June 1898	Colorado and Southern Railway 74, Rio Grande Southern Railroad 74	On static display at the Colorado Railroad Museum, Golden, Colorado.
3687	4-6-0	November 1900	Wisconsin Central Railway 247, to Soo Line Railroad 2645	Mid-Continent Railway Museum, North Freedom, Wisconsin
3697	2-6-0	December 1900	Illinois Central Railroad 3706	Illinois Railway Museum, Union, Illinois
3925	4-6-0	July 1901	New Zealand Railways Department Class Ub 17	On static display at Waitara, New Zealand. Retrieved from Oamaru Locomotive Dump, 2009.
4062	2-8-0	December 1901	Lake Shore and Michigan Southern Railway 780	abandoned in the Maine North Woods following Eagle Lake and West Branch Railroad service
46448	4-6-0	September 1909	Western Pacific 94	On static display at the Western Railway Museum in Rio Vista Junction, California
47764	2-8-0	April 1910	Tooele Valley Railway 11 formerly Buffalo and Susquehanna Railroad 169	On static display in Tooele, Utah at the Tooele Valley Railroad Museum, last used in operational service in 1962.
55972	2-8-2	August 1916	Southern Pacific (Texas and New Orleans) 786	Undergoing restoration by the Austin Steam Train Association in Cedar Park, Texas.
56532	0-6-0	December 1916	Fletcher Granite Company of Westford, MA, last used in 1953, formerly Boston and Maine Railroad 444	On static display at the Chautauqua County Fairgrounds, Dunkirk, NY, 3 miles from where it was built.
57954	2-8-2	September 1917	Formerly Northern Pacific 1762, currently Spokane, Portland and Seattle 539	On static display inside an interpretive center in Kalama, Washington
61858	2-8-2	August 1920	Formerly Minarets and Western 101, currently Valley Railroad 40.	Operational at the Connecticut Valley Railroad, based in Essex, Connecticut.
66544	4-12-2	1926	Union Pacific 9000; prototype, last retired and last surviving of this 88-unit series	On static display at the RailGiants Train Museum inside the Fairplex, Pomona, California
