= Choo choo park =

Park in Claremont, Cape Town, South Africa

Choo Choo Park
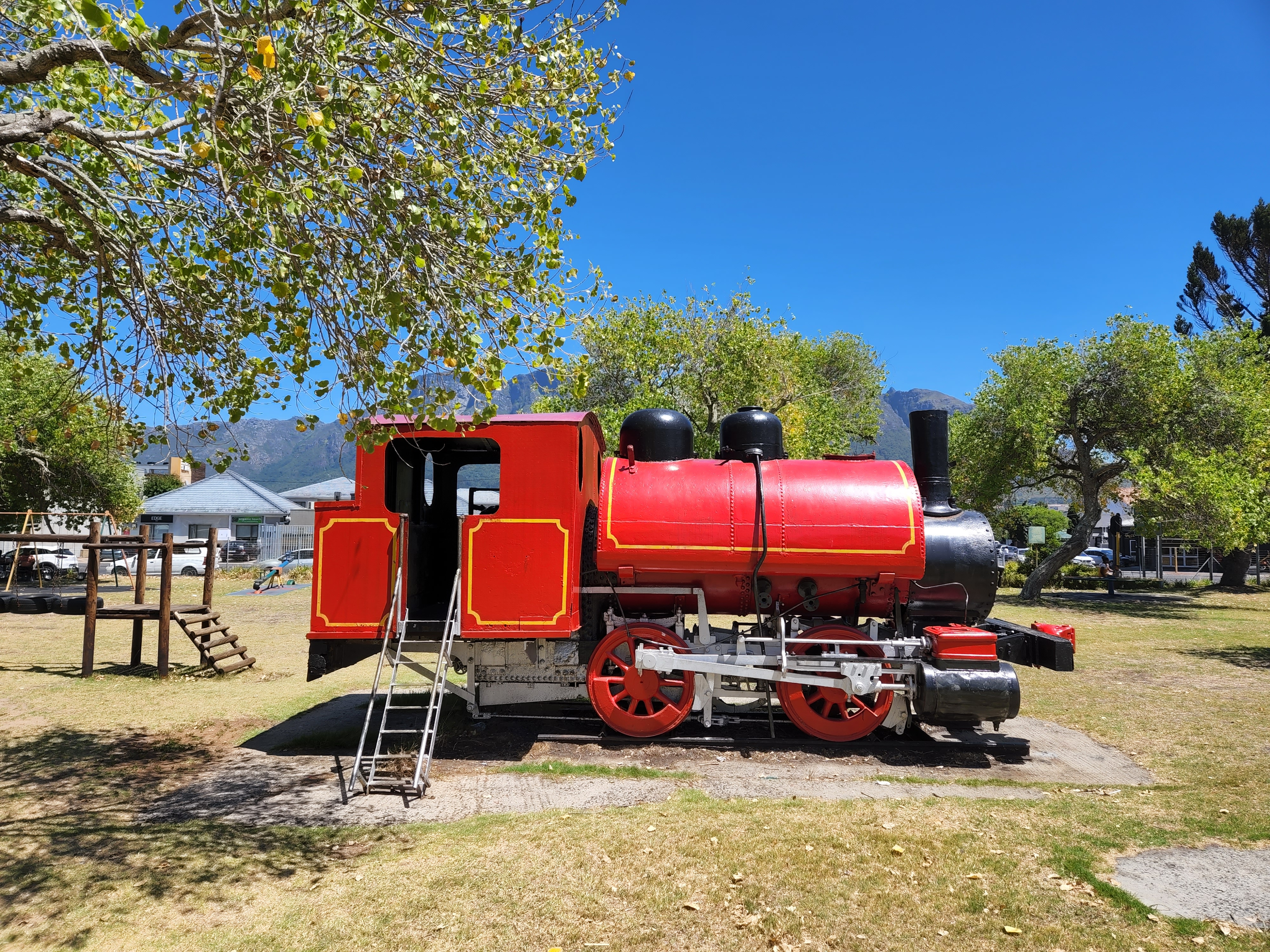
- The train at Choo Choo park in 2023.
- Interactive map of Choo Choo Park
- Type: Playground
- Location: 43 Belvedere Rd, Claremont, Cape Town, 7708, South Africa
- Coordinates: 33.978340°S 18.483047°E
- Operator: City of Cape Town

Choo Choo Park is a public playground in Claremont, Cape Town, in South Africa and is named after the steam train installed in the middle of the park. The 0-4-0 saddle-tank locomotive was built by the Brooks Locomotive Works in 1896 with the serial number 2725. It was originally run by the Transvaal & Delgoa Bay Collieries Ltd near Witbank after which it was acquired by the City of Cape Town to work the Dock Road and the Table Bay power stations at the foreshore. During this later period of its working life the train acquired the nickname “Dyna-Mo” or “Dinah-Mo”. The train was moved to its present position in Choo Choo Park some time after the closure of the power stations in 1962.
