= Fort Allen (Puerto Rico) =

National Guard military installation

- Juana Díaz, Puerto Rico
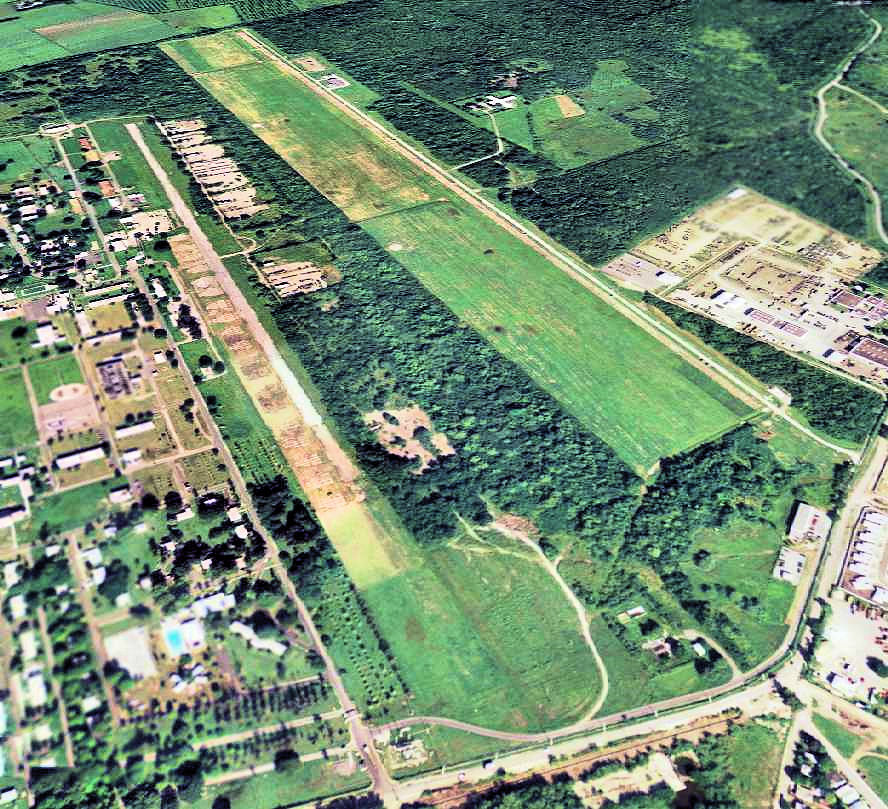
- An October 30, 2004 USGS aerial view looking northwest at the site of Losey AAF

Site information
- Type: Military Base
- Controlled by: Puerto Rico National Guard

Location
- Location within Puerto Rico
- Coordinates: 18°00′32″N 066°30′22″W

Site history
- Built: 1941
- In use: 1941-present

Garrison information
- Garrison: 35th Signal Battalion; 191st Regional Support Group

Fort Allen, officially Fort Allen Training Center, is a Puerto Rico National Guard military installation located on a 373-hectare (921-acre) facility in Juana Díaz, Puerto Rico.

== History ==
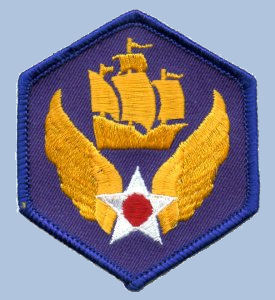
Losey Field
- Part of Sixth Air Force

Site information
- Type: Military airfield
- Controlled by: United States Army Air Forces

Site history
- In use: 1941-1944

Losey Field was established by the United States Army Air Corps (USAAC) in 1941 and was used during World War II by fighter & bomber units. It was named for Captain Robert M. Losey, an aeronautical meteorologist who in April 1940 became the United States' first military casualty in World War II. Units assigned were:

- 4th Tactical Reconnaissance Squadron (13th Composite Wing, 72nd Observation Group) 1 April 1941 – 27 October 1943
- 20th Troop Carrier Squadron (Sixth Air Force Base Command) 10 May–June 1942
- 36th Fighter Group (Headquarters), January 1941-May 1943

22d Fighter Squadron, 6 January-13 December 1941 (P-40 Warhawk)
23rd Fighter Squadron, 6 January-31 May 1941; 15 November-13 December 1941(P-40 Warhawk)
32d Fighter Squadron, 6 January 1941-19 February 1942; 9 March-14 June 1943 (P-40 Warhawk)

- 417th Bombardment Squadron (25th Bombardment Group) 29 May 1943 – 24 March 1944 (B-18 Bolo)

Subsequently:

- 1944: After the departure of the 417th Bombardment Squadron in 1944, the airfield was turned over to Army ground forces.
- 1949: Losey Army Airfield was transferred to United States Army (USA) ground forces and became Camp Losey.
- 1950: Camp Losey was renamed Fort Allen in memory former United States Army Signal Corps commander Brigadier General James Allen. Its new mission providing operational support for the United States and North Atlantic Treaty Organization (NATO) troops during the Korean War.
- 1959: Fort Allen was transferred to the Army's Caribbean Signal Agency.
- 1963: The United States Navy (USN) took control of the military post and redesignated as Naval Radio Station Fort Allen, Puerto Rico.
- 1970: The Headquarters & Communications Center of Naval Communication Station (NAVCOMMSTA) Puerto Rico relocated from San Juan to Fort Allen.
- 1980: The U.S. Navy moved the Naval Communication Station Puerto Rico Headquarters & Communication Center from Fort Allen to Naval Station Roosevelt Roads.
- 1980: On 16 November 1980 Fort Allen became the Headquarters for the United States Army Reserve (USAR) 35th Expeditionary Signal Battalion.
- 1981: The United States Immigration and Naturalization Service (INS) under a presidential order reconfigured Fort Allen as a processing center for Cuban and Haitian refugees.
- 1983: In August 1983 after negotiations with the United States Department of Defense realign Fort Allen by officially transferring 500 aches of land of Fort Allen to the Puerto Rico National Guard (PRNG). One portion was transfer to the Naval Communication Station and another portion was transferred to the United States Army Reserve. The 35th Signal Battalion, along with other U.S. Army Reserve units remain as tenants.
- 1985: The Puerto Rico National Guard Language Center (PRNGLC) relocated to Fort Allen.
- 1997: The U.S. Navy built a receiver site for the Relocatable Over-the-horizon radar (ROTHR) on government land at Fort Allen.
- 1999: The National Guard Youth Challenge Program was established on post.
- 2007: Soldiers from the 35th Signal Battalion, 1st Mission Support Command, were deployed from Fort Allen to support Operation Iraqi Freedom and Operation Enduring Freedom.
- 2011: The Fort Allen Armed Forces Reserve Center (AFRC) was inaugurated and dedicated posthumously to the 6th Adjutant General of the Puerto Rico National Guard and founder of the Language Center at Fort Allen, Major General Salvador Padilla Escabi.

== Current use ==
Since the Navy left Fort Allen in 1980 there's been no regular Active Duty military personnel assigned on post, but the Puerto Rico Army National Guard and U.S. Army Reserve do have permanent Active Guard Reserve personnel present. Fort Allen, while still a federally-owned facility, is operated by the Puerto Rico National Guard (PRNG). Its mission is educational in scope and that of providing support to the Puerto Rico Army National Guard and Army Reserve units stationed in southern Puerto Rico. There is not a Commissary at Fort Allen but FIGNA operates a PX on base for authorized patrons.

=== Units and tenant units ===
- Army National Guard
  - 191st Regional Support Group (HHC)
  - 240th Military Police Company
  - 192nd Support Battalion, C Company (Med)
  - 105th Quartermaster Company
  - 482nd Chemical Company
  - 714th Quartermaster Company

=== LTC Hernan G Pesquera U.S. Army Reserve Center ===
LTC Hernan G. Pesquera United States Army Reserve Center (USARC) is located on 16 hectares (40 acres) within the grounds of Fort Allen, Puerto Rico. This facility is named after retired Army Reserve Lieutenant Colonel and federal judge Hernan Gregorio Pesquera.

Units at the LTC Hernan G. Pesquera United States Army Reserve Center (USARC)

- United States Army Reserve
  - 35th Expeditionary Signal Battalion Headquarters and Headquarters Company (HHC)
  - 204 Transportation MDM Truck Company (POL 5K) (EAB LINEHAUL)
  - 276th Maintenance Support Company (SPT MAINT)

=== Major General Salvador Padilla Escabi Armed Forces Reserve Center ===
On March 4, 2011 a 55,037 square feet (5,113.1 m^{2}) Armed Forces Reserve Center (AFRC) was inaugurated at Fort Allen to relocate the U.S. Army Reserve 8th Multifunctional of the 180th Division and retention office. The Puerto Rico Army National Guard 201st Regiment Multifunctional Training Brigade was located on the Fort Allen Armed Forces Reserve Center. A 155 square feet (14.4 m^{2}) Unheated storage building was also built. It also has a fitness room, locker rooms, weapons simulator, classrooms and private offices, and an armory/vault. The Fort Allen Armed Forces Reserve Center can accommodate 150 Guard and Reserve Soldiers rotating and 126 military personnel per weekend.

This facility was dedicated posthumously to the 6th Adjutant General of the Puerto Rico National Guard (PRNG), former Secretary of State of Puerto Rico and founder of the Language Center at Fort Allen, Major General Salvador M. Padilla Escabi.

=== Officer Candidate School, NCO Academy & Language Center ===
The Puerto Rico Army National Guard Officer Candidate School, NCO Academy and the Language Center for the Puerto Rico Army and Air National Guard recruits are located at Fort Allen.

=== Over-the-horizon radar ===
The United States Navy leases 47-hectare (117-acre) of the other than operational area for a Relocatable Over the Horizon (ROTHR) receiver site was built in 1997 on government land at Fort Allen as part of a surveillance network which is designed to monitor flights over an area encompassing more than 1,000,000 square miles (2,600,000 km^{2}) in South America. The (ROTHR) radar consists of 34 antennas and support structure from 71 feet (22 m) to 123 feet (37 m) tall.

=== Youth Challenge Program ===
The National Guard Youth Challenge Program Community Outreach Youth Program came aboard to Fort Allen in 1999 to intervene and reclaim the lives of 16- to 18-year-old high school dropouts, producing program graduates with the values, life skills, education, and self-discipline necessary to succeed as productive citizens. Participants of the Youth Challenge Program live in Fort Allen during the program.

== See also ==
- Army National Guard
- Puerto Rico National Guard
- Losey Field
- Military of Puerto Rico

== Bibliography ==
- Maurer, Maurer (1983). Air Force Combat Units Of World War II. Maxwell AFB, Alabama: Office of Air Force History. ISBN 0-89201-092-4.
- Maurer, Maurer, ed. (1982) [1969]. Combat Squadrons of the Air Force, World War II (PDF) (reprint ed.). Washington, DC: Office of Air Force History. ISBN 0-405-12194-6. LCCN 70605402. OCLC 72556.
