= 4th Reconnaissance Squadron =

4th Reconnaissance Squadron

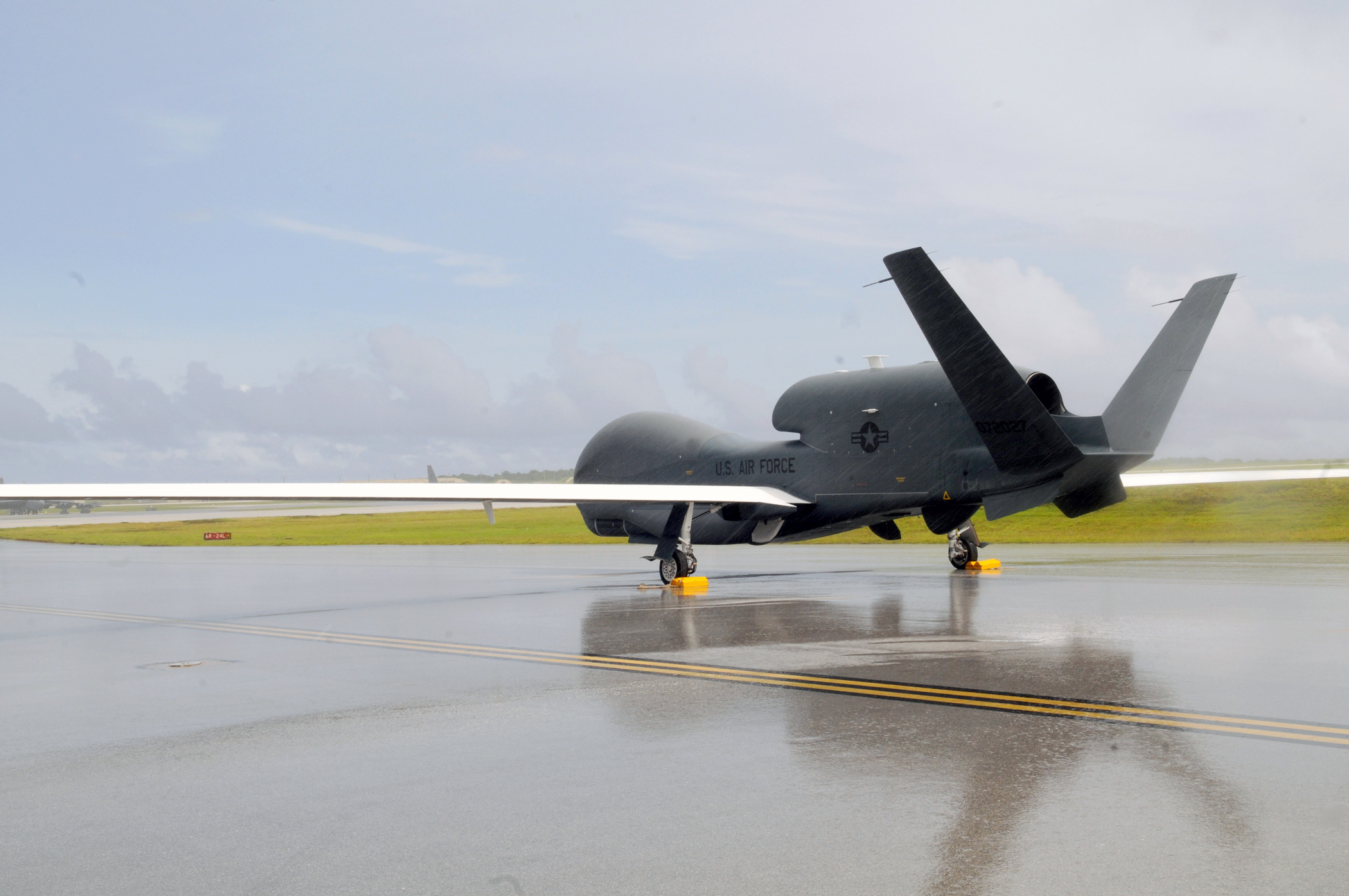
- RQ-4 Global Hawk in the rain at Andersen AFB
- Active: 1941–1949; 1966–1971; 2005; 2009–2014; 2020–present
- Country: United States
- Branch: United States Air Force
- Role: Reconnaissance
- Part of: Air Combat Command
- Garrison/HQ: Yokota Air Base, Japan
- Nickname: Crows
- Engagements: Iraq War; War in Afghanistan
- Decorations: Air Force Meritorious Unit Award; Air Force Outstanding Unit Award

Insignia
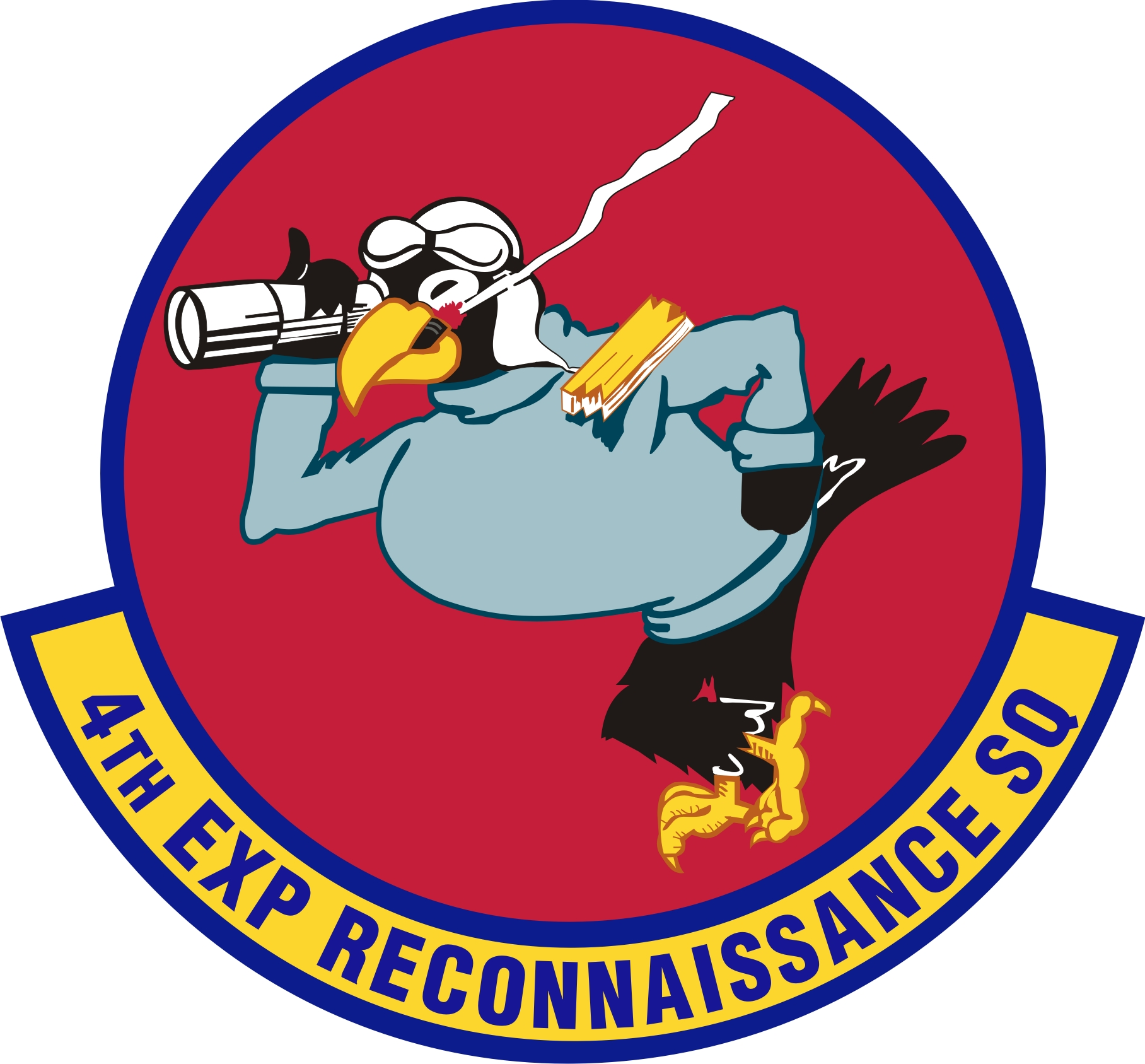
- 4th Reconnaissance Squadron emblem (Note: The World War II emblem was updated 1 February 2010. All elements have been brought within the disc.)

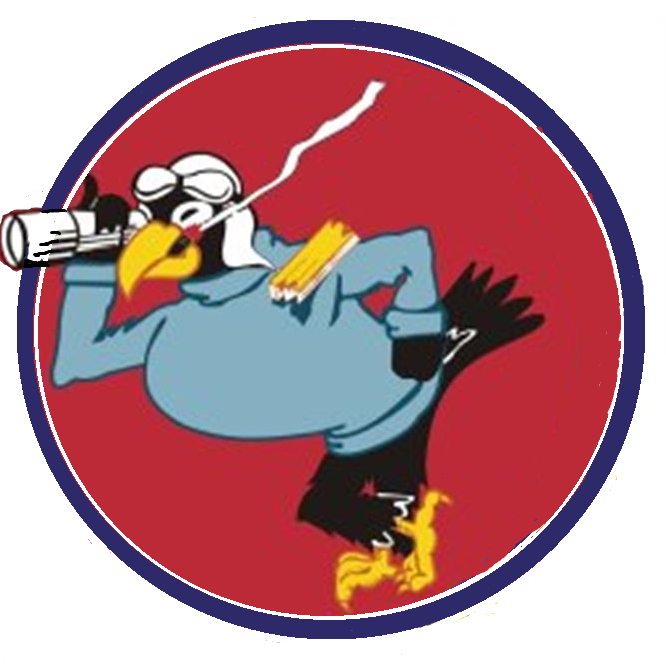
- 4th Observation Squadron emblem (Note: Approved 12 March 1943. /desscription :.)

The 4th Reconnaissance Squadron is an active United States Air Force unit, assigned to the 319th Operations Group and stationed at Yokota Air Base, Japan, from which it operates RQ-4 Global Hawk unmanned vehicles. It was most recently activated in July 2020.

The squadron was first activated as the 4th Observation Squadron in Puerto Rico in 1941. During World War II it served from island bases in the eastern Caribbean Sea. It moved to Panama and remained active after the war as the 4th Tactical Reconnaissance Squadron, becoming one of the first jet equipped reconnaissance squadrons in the Air Force before being inactivated in 1949's military budget reductions.

The squadron was active again from 1966 to 1971, primarily training crews for the Vietnam War until 1969, when it became an operational unit.

In 2005, the squadron was converted to provisional status as the 4th Expeditionary Reconnaissance Flight and flew missions in Iraq until July of that year. It was again activated in Afghanistan as the 4th Expeditionary Reconnaissance Squadron in 2009, operating Beechcraft MC-12W Liberty aircraft until 2014. It was withdrawn from provisional status shortly before activating in 2020.

== Mission ==
The squadron operates the Northrop Grumman RQ-4 Global Hawk unmanned vehicle. In addition to its aircraft, the squadron has a transportable shelter, which contains the "cockpits" for its RQ-4s. It is responsible for launch and recovery of its aircraft, which are typically handed off to units at Beale Air Force Base, California and Grand Forks Air Force Base, North Dakota for operations.

== History ==
=== Caribbean operations ===
==== World War II ====
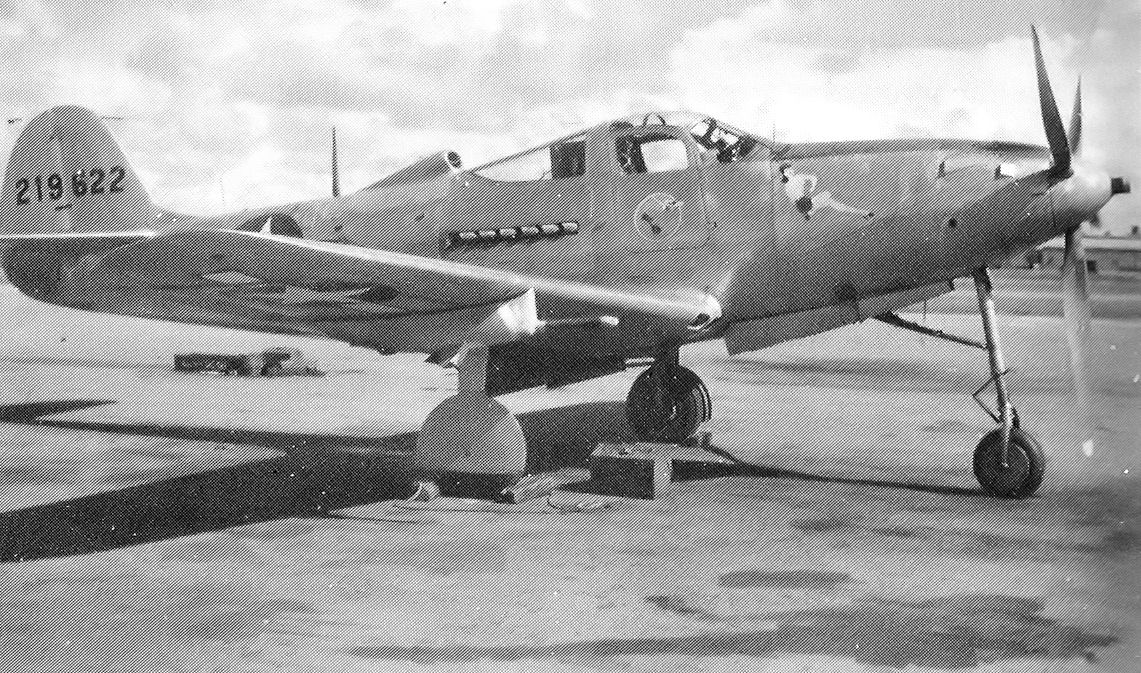
4th Reconnaissance Squadron P-39 at Borinquen Field (Note: Aircraft is Bell P-39Q-5-BE Airacobra, serial 42-19622. Taken in 1943.)

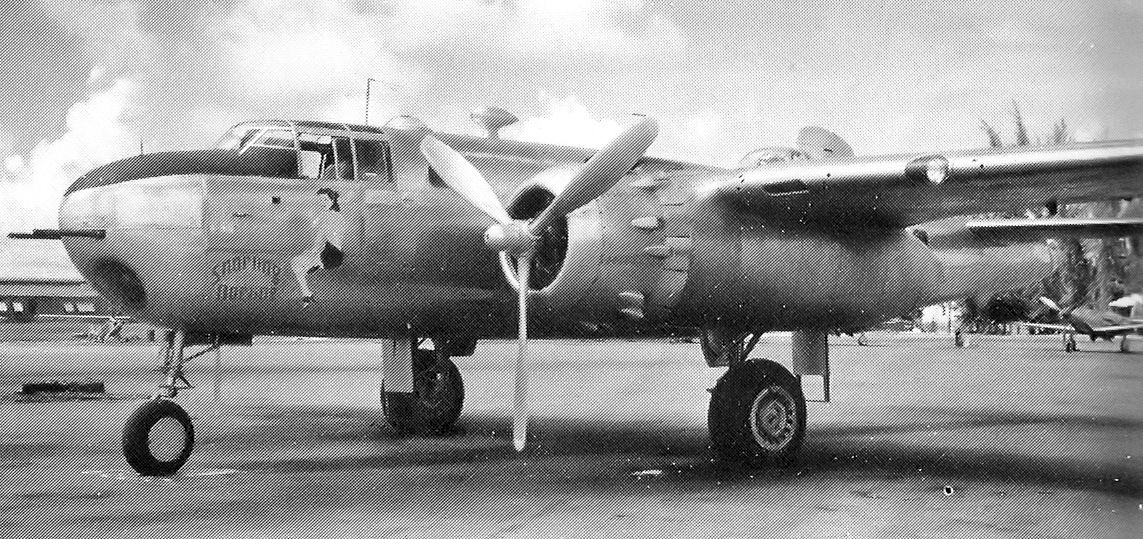
4th Reconnaissance Squadron B-25G Mitchell 1943, Borinquen Field, Puerto Rico,

The squadron was first activated in April 1941 as the 4th Observation Squadron. Initially planned to serve as the main observation unit for the 13th Composite Wing, the unit in fact led something of a nomadic existence, being successively attached or assigned to the Puerto Rican Department, the 72d Observation Group, to the Antilles Air Task Force from 23 March 1943 until 1 June 1943, and finally to the Antilles Air Command itself from 1 June 1943 until the end of the war. In fact, this squadron was the only squadron to both start and finish the war in the Antilles throughout.

The squadron was initially stationed at Ponce Air Base, Puerto Rico when activated. The unit itself had been formed from cadre drawn from Air Corps units already in Puerto Rico. By 5 June 1943, the squadron strength had increased to 12 aircraft. By the end of the month, one of the Curtiss O-52 Owls had been sent on detached service to Haiti, apparently in connection with the attempt that poor nation was making to establishing a coastal patrol of its territorial waters at the time. In early July 1943, the squadron received the first three of a number of Bell P-39Q Airacobra fighters that it was to operate until the end of the war.

On 27 October 1943, the squadron moved en masse to Borinquen Field, as Losey Field was turned over to the Army Ground Forces due to its rather poorly situated runways. At this time, and since the squadron's assignment to Antilles Air Command on 1 June, the unit became one of the primary tactical operating units in the area. Fortunately, the command recognized the new importance of the unit, and lobbied for equipment more capable than previously assigned.

The following month, reflecting the changing war situation, the squadron received a North American B-25D Mitchell and four new B-25Gs, and in February 1943 added three more P-39Qs (for a total of nine), three new P-39Ns, and Douglas B-18 Bolos.

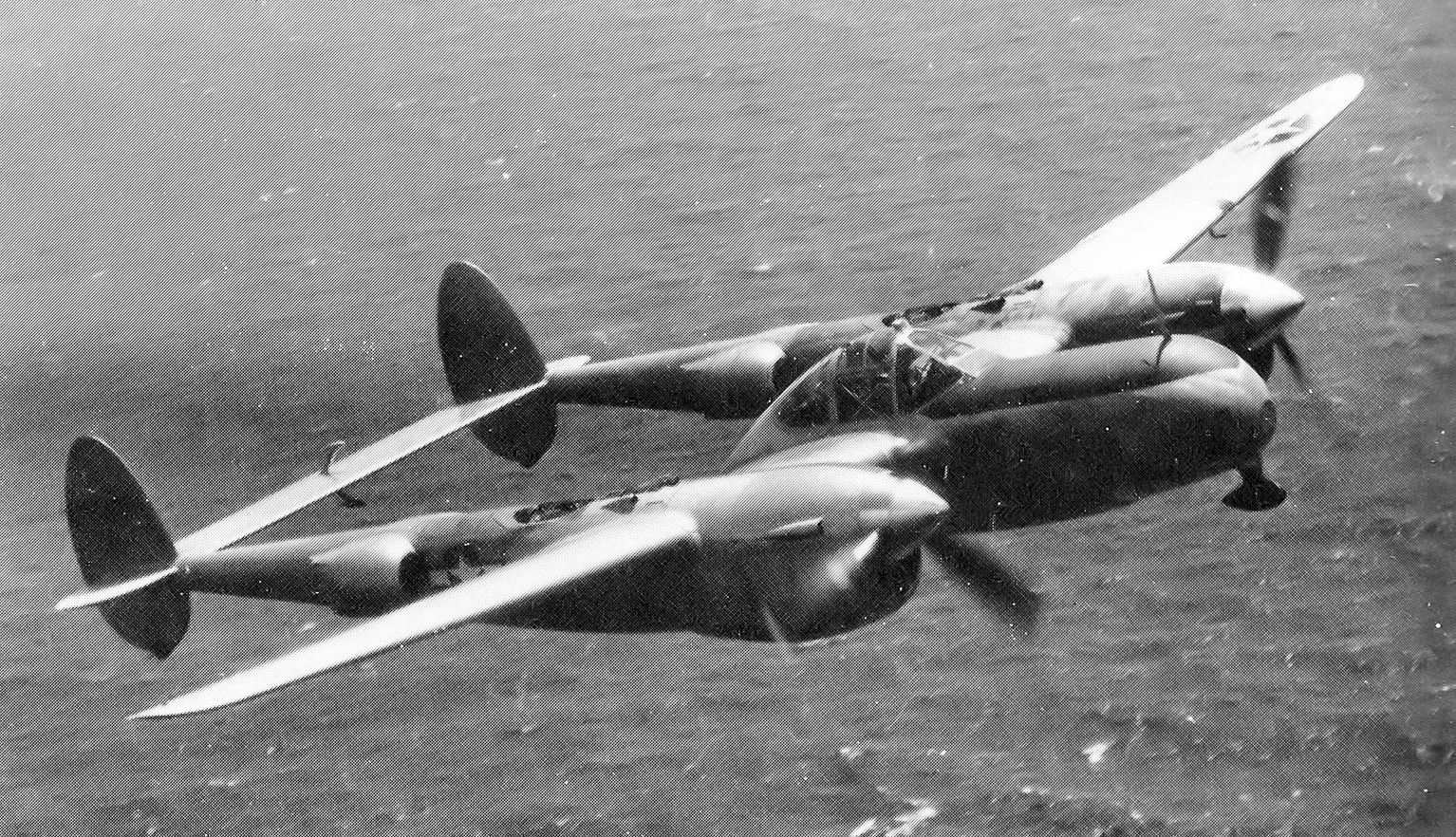
4th Reconnaissance Squadron F-5 Lightning near Coolidge Field, Antigua

The squadron was occasionally tasked to perform flights throughout the Caribbean and, on one occasion, when the new airport was dedicated at Ciudad Trujillo in the Dominican Republic, every available P-39 was sent over (with belly tanks) where they put on a very lengthy aerial display for the locals.

By 10 March 1944, unit strength had been considerably depleted, and the on-hand aircraft census consisted of three B¬25Ds and B-25Gs, a B-18 and a B-18C, three P-39Ns, and three P-39Qs. In October 1944, the Squadron received additional B-25D's. Shortly thereafter, the squadron was redesignated the 4th Tactical Reconnaissance Squadron.

Aside from frequent detachments of aircraft throughout the entire Caribbean basin during most of the war on an "as needed" basis, the unit itself did not move as a whole again until 21 May 1945 when it moved from Borinquen to Coolidge Field on Antigua where the unit also welcomed with six new Lockheed F-5G Lightnings in June.

==== Move to Panama ====
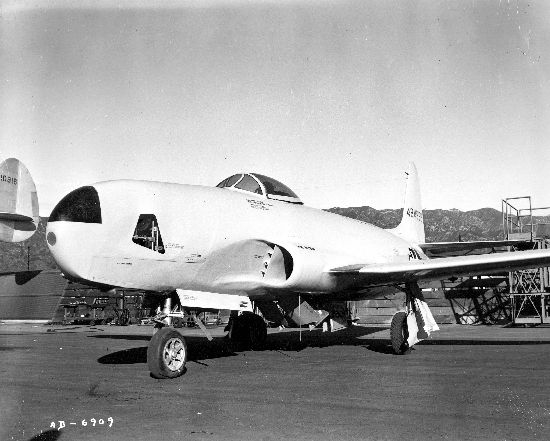
Lockheed FP-80 Shooting Star

The squadron remained active after the war, moving from the Antilles to Rio Hato Army Air Base in March 1946, when it was assigned to Caribbean Air Command. In 1947, it became one of the first reconnaissance units of the new United States Air Force to be equipped with jet aircraft, when it began to fly the Lockheed RF-80 Shooting Star, moving to France Field, Panama Canal Zone in December. Because the runways at France Field were to short to accommodate the new jets, the squadron's Shooting Stars used the runway at the neighboring Coco Solo Naval Base, although this involved extensive taxiing until the planes were finally moved to the ramp at Coco Solo. President Truman's reduced 1949 defense budget required reductions in the number of units in the Air Force, and the squadron was inactivated on 14 March.

=== Vietnam war era ===
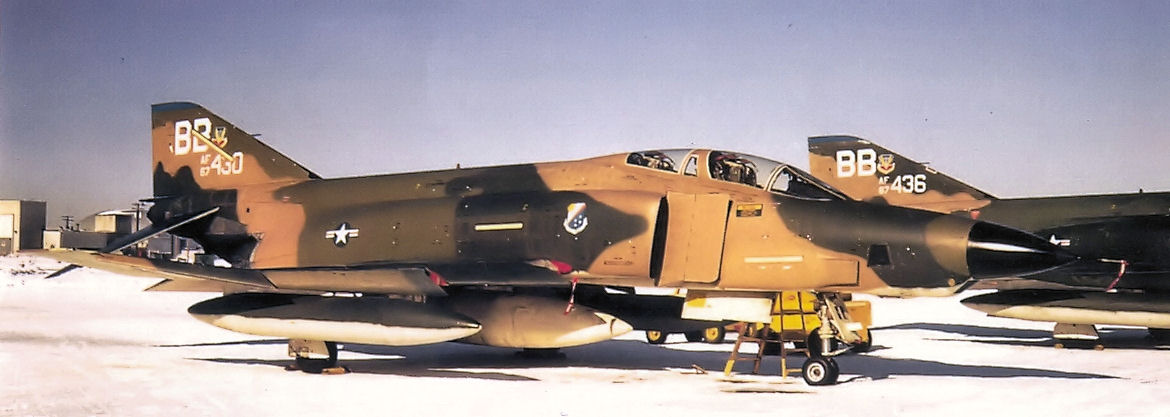
Bergstrom RF-4 after transfer to the 45th Tactical Reconnaissance Squadron (Note: Aircraft is McDonnell RF-4C-33-MC Phantom II, serial 67-0430.)

The squadron was organized in November 1966 as part of the 75th Tactical Reconnaissance Wing at Bergstrom Air Force Base, Texas. The squadron was an operational training unit and prepared aircrews for the Vietnam War. In November 1969, it became an operational unit, maintaining a worldwide mobility capability and training for operational missions. In October 1971, the squadron was inactivated and its personnel, mission and equipment were assigned to the 45th Tactical Reconnaissance Squadron, which was activated in its place.

=== Expeditionary operations ===
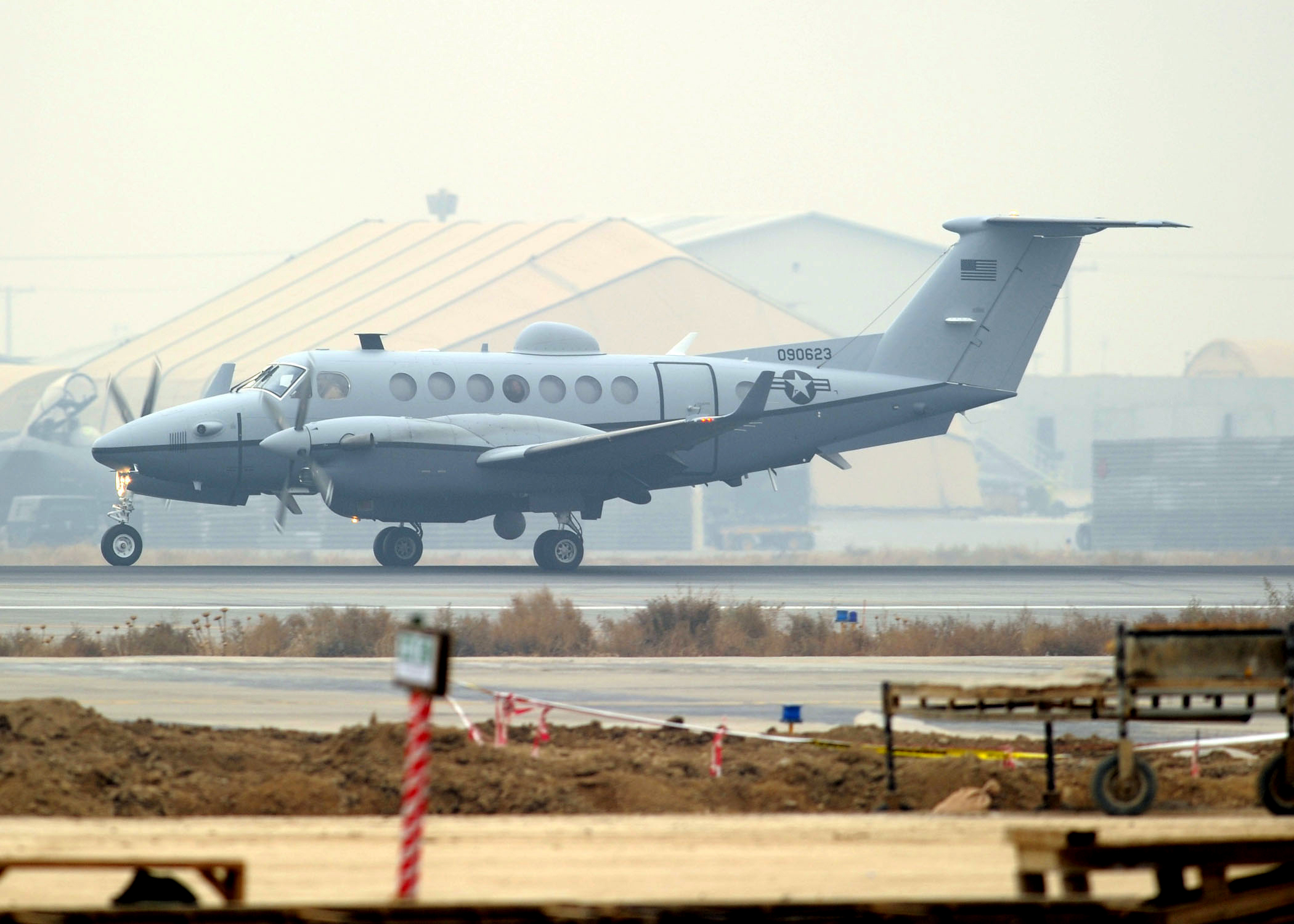
Airmen welcome the first Air Force MC-12 to be based in Afghanistan (Note: Aircraft is Beechcraft MC-12W Liberty, serial 09-623, operated by the 4th Expeditionary Reconnaissance Squadron.)

In January 2005, the squadron was converted to provisional status as the 4th Expeditionary Reconnaissance Flight and assigned to Air Combat Command to activate or inactivate as needed for operations. It was immediately activated at Balad Air Base, Iraq and flew missions with the Beechcraft RC-12D Guardrail in the Iraq War for six months before inactivating.

It was activated as the 4th Expeditionary Reconnaissance Squadron in June 2009 at Kandahar Air Base, Afghanistan. In November 2009, it moved to Bagram Airfield, Afghanistan to operate the Beechcraft MC-12W Liberty with crews deployed from other locations. Along with the 361st Expeditionary Reconnaissance Squadron, it was one of two MC-12 squadrons comprising Project Liberty. (Note: >Everstine mentions a third squadron, the 362d Expeditionary Reconnaissance Squadron, operating in Iraq.) Airmen deploying to the squadron came from units flying other types of aircraft and went through flight training at Key Field, Mississippi.

On 1 October 2014, the squadron inactivated, as its mission was assigned to Joint Task Force Thor and MC-12W operations transferred from the Air Force to the Army. The squadron flew over 40,000 combat flights in Afghanistan. In its last year of operation it participated in the capture or death of over 2400 enemy combatants, including 375 identified as "high value."

=== Return to regular status ===
On 21 July 2020, the squadron returned to regular status, dropping the "expeditionary" and becoming the 4th Reconnaissance Squadron. Two days later, it was activated with station at Andersen Air Force Base, Guam, where it took over the personnel, mission, and RQ-4 Global Hawks of Detachment 1, 319th Operations Group, which was discontinued. The activation ceremony took place, however, at Yokota Air Base, Japan, where the unit was deployed at the time it activated. The change in designation also involved the transfer of maintenance of the squadron's RQ-4s to the military. Maintenance for Detachment 1 had been performed by civilian contractors. The unit deployed each year to bases in Japan during the typhoon season in Guam.

In June 2026, the squadron made its move to Yokota permanent. The move was made to provide persistent reconnaissance in a region where challenges to a free and open Indo-Pacific continue to increase. The squadron's aircraft made the move in late May.

== Lineage ==
- Constituted as the 4th Observation Squadron on 22 November 1940

Activated on 1 April 1941
Redesignated 4th Observation Squadron (Medium) on 26 February 1942
Redesignated 4th Observation Squadron on 4 July 1942
Redesignated 4th Reconnaissance Squadron (Special) on 25 June 1943
Redesignated 4th Tactical Reconnaissance Squadron on 20 May 1944
Redesignated 4th Tactical Reconnaissance Squadron (Photographic) on 17 June 1948
Inactivated on 14 March 1949
Redesignated 4th Tactical Reconnaissance Squadron and activated on 25 Oct 1966 (not organized)

- Organized on 18 November 1966

Inactivated on 15 October 1971

- Redesignated 4th Expeditionary Reconnaissance Flight, converted to provisional status, and activated on 31 January 2005

Inactivated on 7 July 2005

- Redesignated 4th Expeditionary Reconnaissance Squadron on 16 May 2007

Activated on 26 June 2009
Inactivated on 1 October 2014

- Withdrawn from provisional status and redesignated 4th Reconnaissance Squadron on 21 July 2020

Activated on 23 July 2020

=== Assignments ===
- 13th Composite Wing, April 1941
- Puerto Rican Department, 14 July 1941
- 72d Observation Group, 29 March 1942 (attached to Puerto Rican Department until 23 March 1943, then to Antilles Air Task Force)
- Antilles Air Command, 1 June 1943
- Caribbean Air Command, 25 August 1946 (attached to Provisional Composite Reconnaissance Group after 1 February 1948)
- 6th Fighter Wing, 1 June 1948 (attached to Provisional Composite Reconnaissance Group)
- 5600th Group, 28 July 1948
- 5600th Wing (later 5600th Composite Wing), 20 August 1948 – 14 March 1949
- Tactical Air Command, 25 October 1966 (not organized)
- 75th Tactical Reconnaissance Wing, c. 18 Nov 1966;
- 67th Tactical Reconnaissance Wing, 15 July – 15 October 1971
- Air Combat Command to activate or inactivate as needed, 31 January 2005 – 21 July 2020

332nd Expeditionary Operations Group, 1 January 2005 – 7 July 2005
451st Expeditionary Operations Group, 26 June 2009
455th Expeditionary Operations Group, 23 November 2009 – 1 October 2014

- 319th Operations Group, 23 July 2020 – present

=== Stations ===
- Ponce Air Base (later Losey Field), Puerto Rico, 1 April 1941
- Borinquen Field, Puerto Rico, 27 October 1943
- Coolidge Field, Antigua, 21 May 1945
- Borinquen Field, Puerto Rico, 5 October 1945
- Rio Hato Army Air Base, Panama, 20 August 1946
- France Field, Panama Canal Zone, 11 December 1947
- Howard Field, Panama Canal Zone, 20 August 1948 – 14 March 1949
- Bergstrom Air Force Base, Texas, 18 November 1966 – 15 October 1971
- Balad Air Base, Iraq, 1 January 2005 – 7 July 2005
- Kandahar Air Base, Afghanistan, 26 June 2009
- Bagram Airfield, Afghanistan, 23 November 2009 – 1 October 2014
- Andersen Air Force Base, Guam, 23 July 2020
- Yokota Air Base, Japan, 15 June 2026 – present

=== Aircraft ===
- North American O-47,1941–1945
- Curtiss O-52 Owl, 1941–1944
- Bell P-39 Airacobra, 1943–1945
- North American B-25 Mitchell, 1944–1946
- Lockheed F-5 Lightning, 1945–1946
- Stinson O-49 Vigilant, 1941–1945
- Martin B-26 Marauder, 1944–1945
- de Havilland F-8 Mosquito 1947–1948
- Lockheed RF-80 Shooting Star, 1947–1949
- McDonnell RF-4C Phantom II, 1969–1971
- Beechcraft RC-12D Guardrail, 2005
- Beechcraft MC-12W Liberty, 2009–2014
- Northrop Grumman RQ-4 Global Hawk, 2020–present
