= Dunkirk High School =

Coordinates: 42.477533°N 79.340032°W

Location
- 75 W 6th St; Dunkirk, New York 14048; United States

Information
- Type: Public
- Established: 1965
- NCES School ID: 360942000719
- Principal: Rebecca Farwell Adam Hernandez Connie Meginnins Joshua Tedone
- Teaching staff: 87.17 (FTE)
- Grades: 7 - 12
- Enrollment: 896 (2023–2024)
- Student to teacher ratio: 10.28
- Colors: Maroon & White
- Mascot: Marauder
- Website: www.dunkirkcsd.org/dunkirkhs/site/default.asp

Dunkirk High School (DHS) is a public high school located in Dunkirk, New York. It is situated on 6th Street, a few blocks from the city downtown. The High School currently enrolls 756 students in grades 7 through 12.

== School overview ==
Dunkirk High School serves as the only public High School in the city. The school enrolls 603 students in grades 9 through 12. The ethnic break-down is as follow: White 51%, Hispanic 40%, Black 9% and Asian 1%. The faculty is composed by 60 classroom teachers. The graduation rate is 71%.

== Sports activities ==
- Bowling
- Basketball
- Wrestling
- Cross Country
- Golf
- Indoor Track
- Outdoor Track
- Soccer
- Swimming
- Tennis
- Cheerleading
- Softball
- Volleyball
- Football
- Baseball
