= Howard Air Force Base =

Airport

Howard Air Force Base
- Part of Air Combat Command
- Located near Balboa, Panama
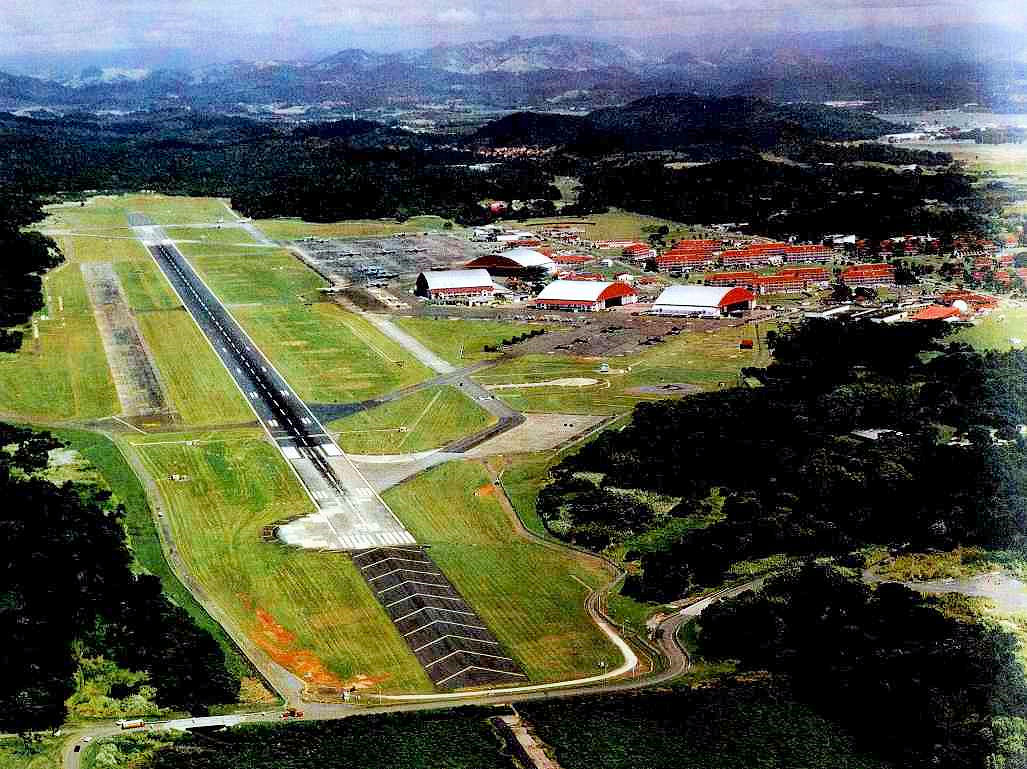
- Howard Air Force Base, Canal Zone, about 1970

Site information
- Type: Public
- Controlled by: United States Air Force

Location
- Coordinates: 8°54′54″N 79°35′58″W

Site history
- Built: 1939
- In use: 1942-1999

Howard Air Force Base (IATA: BLB, ICAO: MPHO) is a former United States Air Force base located in Panama. It discontinued military operations on 1 November 1999 as a result of the Torrijos-Carter Treaties, which specified that US military facilities in the former Panama Canal Zone be closed and the facilities be turned over to the Panamanian government.

The airport is located 9.7 kilometres (6.0 mi) southwest of Balboa, at the southern (Pacific) end of the Panama Canal. Most of the area around it was uninhabited and formed part of the Panama Canal Zone watershed, although Panama City could be reached by crossing the nearby Bridge of the Americas.

After demilitarization, the facility reopened as Panamá Pacífico International Airport in 2014.

== Overview ==
For over 50 years, Howard Air Force Base was the bastion of US air power in Central and South America. In its heyday, it was the center for counter-drug operations, military and humanitarian airlift, contingencies, joint-nation exercises, and search and rescue. It boasted fighters, cargo planes, tankers, airborne warning and control aircraft, operational support airlift "executive" jets, and search and rescue helicopters.

It was also home to a host of transient U.S. Army and U.S. Navy aircraft. Personnel assigned to tenant commands at Howard AFB tracked drug traffickers from South America, and its cargo aircraft, primarily rotational Lockheed C-130 Hercules aircraft from the active duty U.S. Air Force, the Air Force Reserve and the Air National Guard, provided theater airlift for United States Southern Command (USSOUTHCOM) contingencies, exercises, and disaster relief, and conducted search and rescue in the vast region.

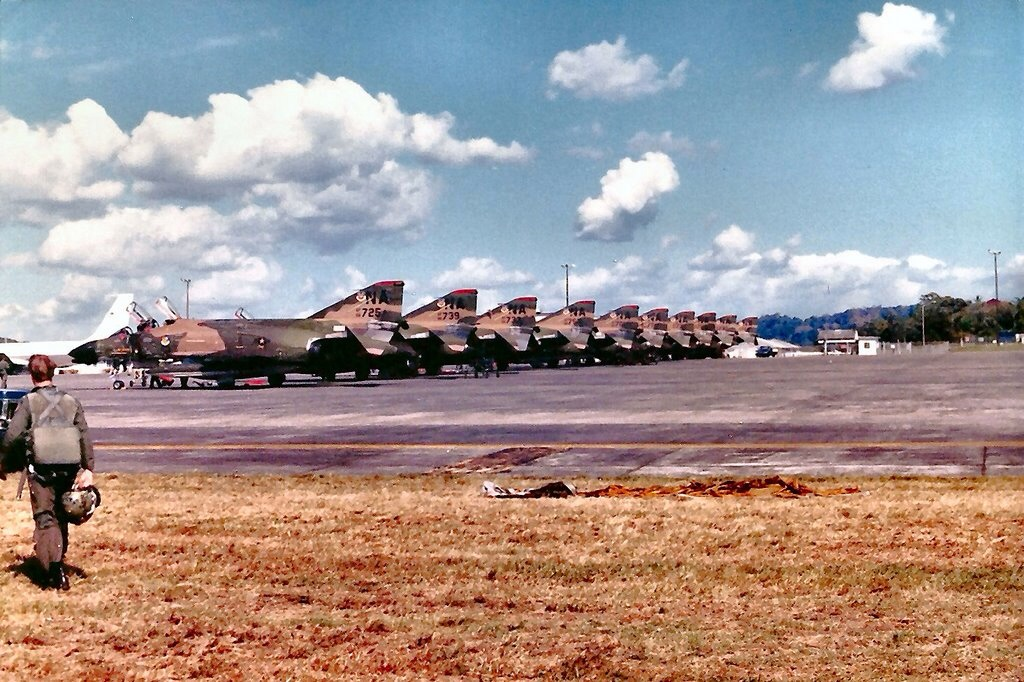
McDonnell-Douglas F-4D Phantoms deployed at Howard Air Force Base, 1980

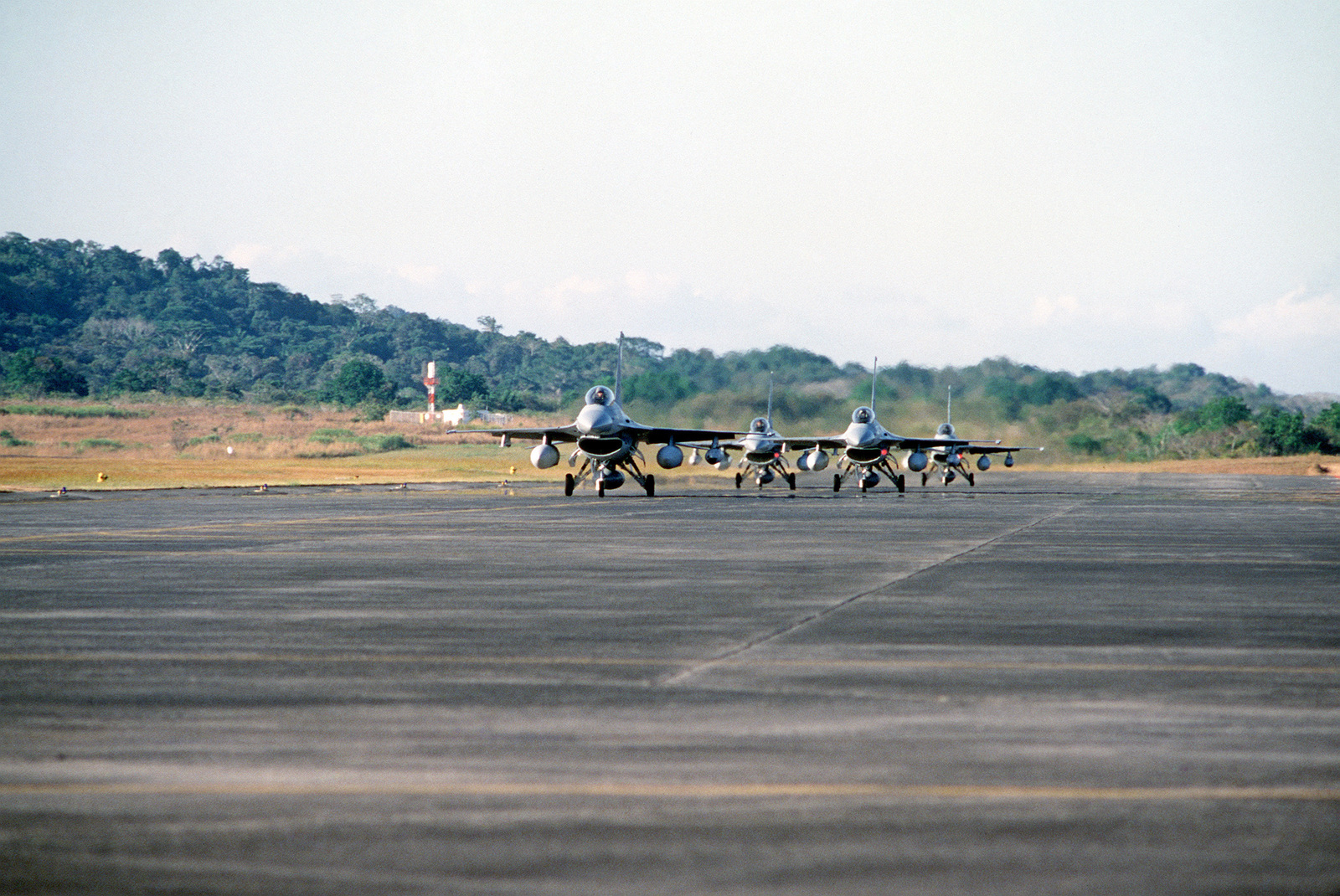
Four F-16 Fighting Falcon aircraft taxi to the parking apron upon their arrival for Exercise KINDLE LIBERTY 83.

Only a portion of the transports, several special-mission C-130s, ten C-27A Spartan aircraft, and executive jets belonged to the host unit, the 24th Composite Wing, later redesignated the 24th Wing. Although Regular Air Force C-130 aircraft rotated to Howard AFB for 90-day detachments in the 1970s and early 1980s in the support mission called CORONET OAK, this mission was later transferred to the Air Force Reserve and the Air National Guard, which then provided C-130s for VOLANT OAK. Vought A-7 Corsair II and later General Dynamics F-16 Fighting Falcon fighters also rotated through Howard AFB.

== History ==
Carved out of the jungle, 460 metres (500 yd) from the Pacific Ocean, Howard Air Base opened in 1942. It was named after Major Charles H. Howard (1892–1936), who flew in Panama in the late 1920s.

The only five-star general in Air Force history, Henry H. "Hap" Arnold played a prominent role in the history of Howard AFB and military aviation in Panama. As a captain, Arnold led the first air unit, the 7th Aero Squadron, to the Isthmus on March 29, 1917. Within a week, he left for Washington, DC, and more pressing duties there. When he returned to Panama in May 1939, he was a major general and chief of the Army Air Corps. The purpose of his visit was to select a site for a new air base. He chose what is now Howard AFB and suggested the name Howard Field, in honor of Major Charles H. Howard, a personal friend and former subordinate who had served in Panama during the period 1926–1929 and who had been part of Arnold's crew on his famed flight of B-10 bombers to Alaska in 1934. Major Howard died in an air crash on October 25, 1936. On December 1, 1939, the new air base officially became Howard Field.

Construction began shortly thereafter and the first troops arrived on May 15, 1941. Howard Field hosted both fighter and bomber aircraft during the World War II era. The base was inactivated on January 1, 1950, and its real estate turned over to the Army.

The Air Force continued to use Howard as a deployment site for joint training exercises during the 1950s, and by December 1961 all USAF flying operations in Panama relocated to Howard. On October 1, 1963, the Air Force officially reclaimed Howard from the Army and the base played a central role in US military operations in Latin America ever since, largely due to its 2,600-metre (8,500 ft) runway and its status as the only jet-capable US air field south of the Rio Grande.

Control of the Panama Canal changed hands on 31 December 1999, from the United States to Panama. Department of Defense elements began drawing down more than a year earlier, in anticipation of the deadline established by the Panama Canal Treaty of 1977. The last of the fixed-wing US aircraft departed Howard Air Force Base on 1 May 1999. On 1 November 1999, the 24th Wing inactivated and Howard Air Force Base was turned over to the Panamanian government.

== Previous names ==
- Bruja Point Military Reservation, 11 August 1928
- Fort Bruja, 1929
- Fort Kobbe (named after Maj Gen William A. Kobbe, USA, who died 1 November 1931) 1932; airfield section of Fort Kobbe named Howard Field, 1 December 1939
- Howard Air Base, 10 July 1941
- Howard Air Force Base, 1948 – February 1950; October 1955 – 1999

== Major commands to which assigned ==
- Panama Canal Department, 1 December 1939 – 19 October 1940
- Panama Canal Air Force, 19 October 1940 – 5 August 1941
- Caribbean Air Force, 5 August 1941 – 18 September 1942
- Sixth Air Force, 18 September 1942 – 31 July 1946
- Caribbean Air Command, 31 July 1946 – 8 July 1963

Operations at Howard drew down during the summer of 1949 and all training ceased on 11 October 1949; the base was transferred in inactive status to United States Army Caribbean in February 1950. In the 1950s, Albrook AFB used Howard to reduce aircraft activity at Albrook; a joint United States Army Caribbean, and Caribbean Air Comd, USAF, agreement (18 August 1955) permitted the resumption of regular flying operations at Howard in October 1955.

- United States Air Forces Southern Command, 8 July 1963 – 1 January 1976
- Tactical Air Command

USAF Southern Air Division, 1 January 1976 – 1 January 1989
830th Air Division, 1 January 1989 – 15 February 1991
Air Forces Panama, 15 February 1991 – 11 February 1992

- Tactical Air Command, 11 February – 31 May 1992
- Air Combat Command, 31 May 1992 – 1 November 1999

== Major units assigned ==
- 16th Air Base Group, 15 May 1941 – c. June 1943
- 44th Reconnaissance Squadron, 8 July – 27 October 1941
- 15th Air Base Squadron, 15 May 1941 – 1 October 1945
- 7th Reconnaissance Squadron, 26 November – 11 December 1941
- 59th Bombardment Squadron, 28 October – 11 December 1941
- 397th Bombardment Squadron, 26 November – 10 December 1941
- 51st Pursuit Squadron, 10–23 December 1941
- 53d Fighter Group, 1 January – 26 November 1942
- 72nd Observation Group, 18 January 1942 – 1 November 1943
- 40th Bombardment Group, 16 June – 16 September 1942
- 20th Troop Carrier Squadron, 19 February 1942 – 9 June 1943
- 37th Fighter Group, 20 September 1942 – 1 November 1943
- VI Air Force Ground Support Command, 14 October 1942 – 21 August 1943
- 6th Bombardment Group, 14 January – 1 November 1943
- 40th Bombardment Group, 2–16 June 1943
- 43d Fighter Squadron, 9 February – 6 April 1944; 29 August 1944 – 10 January 1945
- 51st Fighter Squadron, 10 June 1944 – 15 October 1946
- 32d Fighter Squadron, 10 January 1945 – 15 October 1946
- 28th Fighter Squadron, 25 September 1945 – 15 October 1946
- 30th Fighter Squadron, 25 September 1945 – 15 October 1946
- 1300th Military Airlift Squadron, tenant unit administratively assigned to the 437th Military Airlift Wing, 1 March 1978 - 1 December 1982
- 1978th Communications Group (Air Force Communications Command)
- 582nd Air Service Group, 20 September 1946 – 26 July 1948
- 36th Fighter Group, 15 October 1946 – 13 August 1948

Redesignated 36th Fighter Wing, 2 July 1948 - 13 August 1948

- 530th Aircraft Control and Warning Group, 15 October 1946 – 16 April 1948
- 5605th Air Base Group, 26 July 1948 – 25 April 1949
- 23d Fighter Wing, 25 April 1949 - 24 September 1949

23rd Air Base Group, 25 April 1949 - 24 September 1949

- 560th Air Base Squadron, 24 September 1949 - 15 December 1949
- 5700th Air Base Group (Wing), 24 October 1954 – 8 November 1967
- 605th Air Commando Squadron, 16 November 1963 – 30 September 1972
- 5700th Operations Squadron, 15 May 1964 – 15 March 1968
- 61st Military Airlift Group 1 Dec 1984-1 June 1992
- 24th Composite Wing (various designations), 3 January 1968 – 1 November 1999

24th Air Base Group, 8 November 1967 - 1 January 1976
Redesignated: 24th Combat Support Group, 1 January 1976 - 1 November 1999

- 6933rd Electronic Security Squadron

== Education ==
The Department of Defense Education Activity (DoDEA) formerly operated Howard Elementary School for children of American military dependents. The DoDEA secondary schools in Panama were Curundu Middle School and Balboa High School.

== See also ==
- List of former United States military installations in Panama
- List of United States Air Force installations
