= 43rd Fighter Squadron =

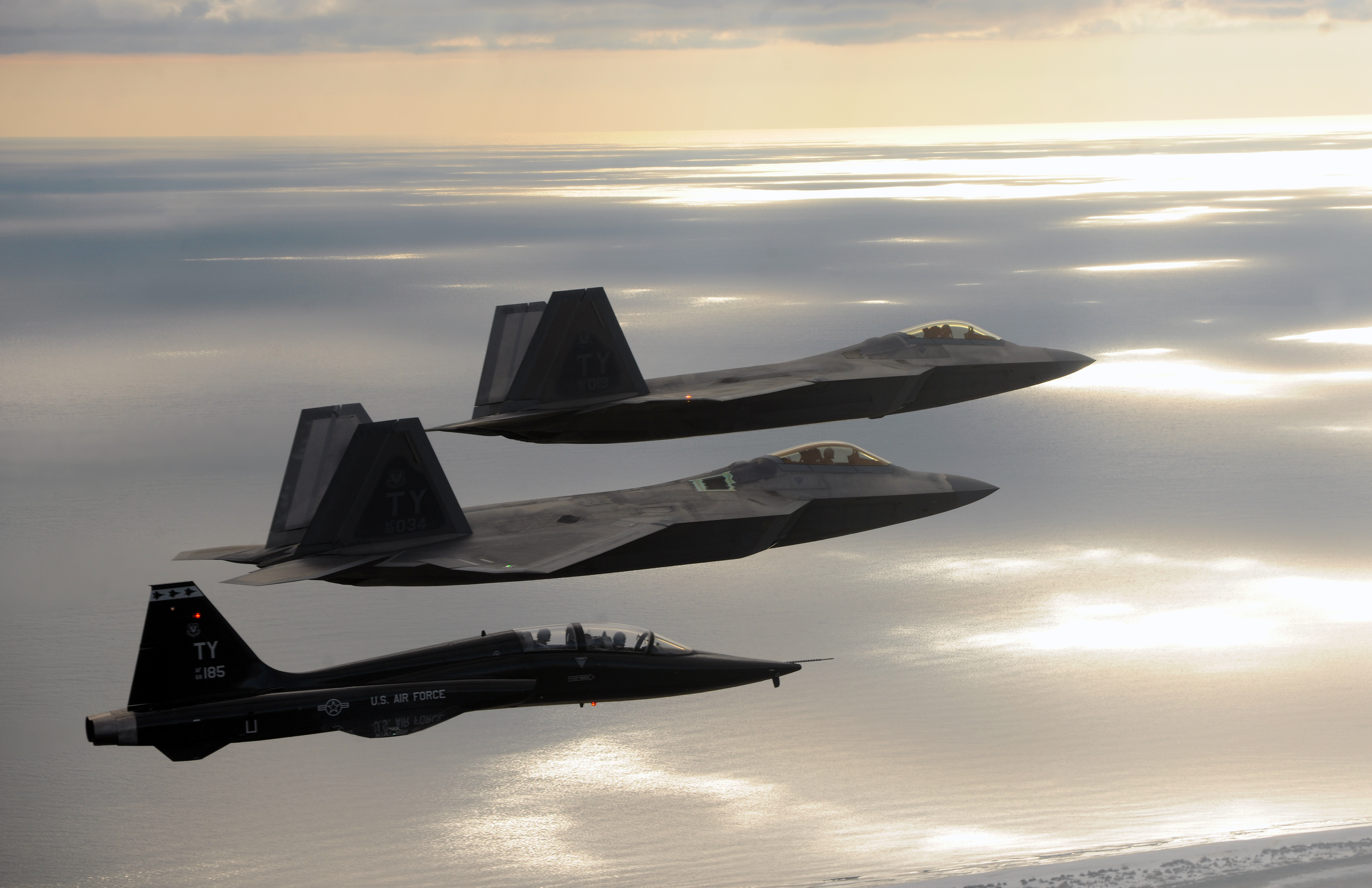
- 43rd Fighter Squadron F-22A Raptors (Note: Aircraft are Lockheed Martin Block 10 F-22A Raptor 01-4019 and 02-4034.)
- Active: 1917–1919; 1922–1936; 1940–1946; 1964–1994; 2002–2023
- Country: United States
- Branch: United States Air Force
- Role: Fighter training
- Part of: Air Combat Command
- Garrison/HQ: Tyndall Air Force Base
- Nickname: Hornets
- Motto: Vespa Maculata
- Engagements: World War I Vietnam War
- Decorations: Air Force Outstanding Unit Award

Insignia
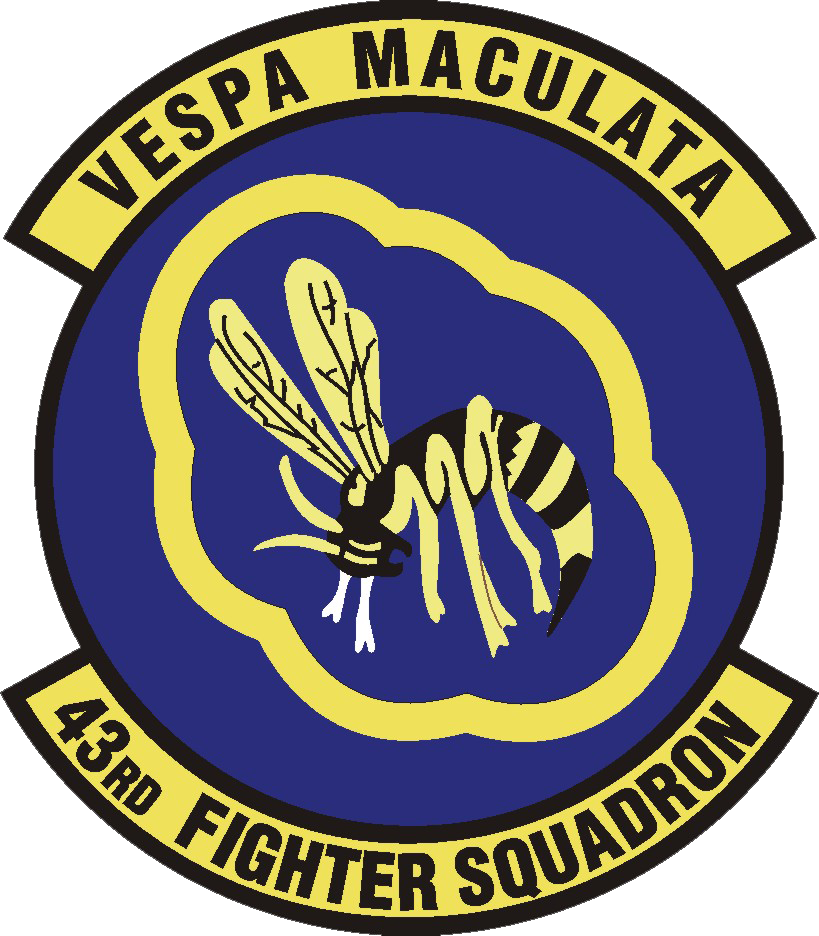
- 43d Fighter Squadron emblem

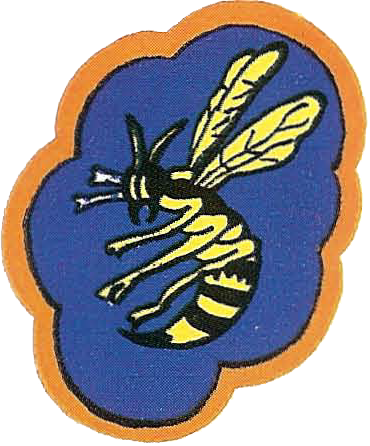
- 43d School Squadron emblem (approved 22 May 1924)

The 43rd Fighter Squadron is an inactive United States Air Force unit, and was part of the 325th Fighter Wing at Tyndall Air Force Base, Florida. It had conducted advanced fighter training for F-22 Raptor pilots.

The squadron is one of the oldest in the United States Air Force, its origins dating to 13 June 1917, when it was organized at Kelly Field, Texas as the 43rd Aero Squadron. The squadron deployed to England as part of the American Expeditionary Force during World War I. The squadron saw combat during World War II, served in the Vietnam War and later became part of the Alaskan Air Command (AAC) during the Cold War.

== Mission ==
The 43d Fighter Squadron is responsible for providing air dominance training for the F-22 Raptor.

== History ==
=== World War I ===
The 43d Fighter Squadron traces its lineage to the 43d Aero Squadron, first activated 13 June 1917, at Camp Kelly, Texas. In March 1918, the squadron moved to England, where it trained until reassigned to France where it landed on 25 October, reaching on the same day the Air Service Replacement Concentration Barracks at St. Maixent. Ordered to 3rd Aviation Instruction Center, the squadron arrived at the Issoudun Aerodrome on 1 November. The armistice signed on 11 November made it redundant, and it stayed at Issoudun until early 1919, when it moved to the harbor of Bordeaux, France, leaving France on 18 March, bound for the United States

=== Inter-war years ===
The 43d was reactivated on 22 July 1922, at Kelly Field, Texas, and was redesignated the 43d School Squadron in January 1923. The squadron flew various aircraft, including the DH-4, Spad XIII, SE-5, MB-7, AT-4, AT-5, PW-9, P-1, and P-12. The 43d became known as the "Hornets" as depicted by their emblem, a poised Vespa Maculata, or American "Yellow Jacket," the most formidable of the wasp family, surrounded by an ovate cloud. The emblem was approved in 1924 and the Hornet signifies the speed, agility and hard-hitting capabilities of the squadron while the cloud represents their domain - the skies. In March 1935, the 43d was redesignated the 43d Pursuit Squadron, flying as part of the 3d Wing Advanced Flying School until it was inactivated in September 1936.

=== World War II ===
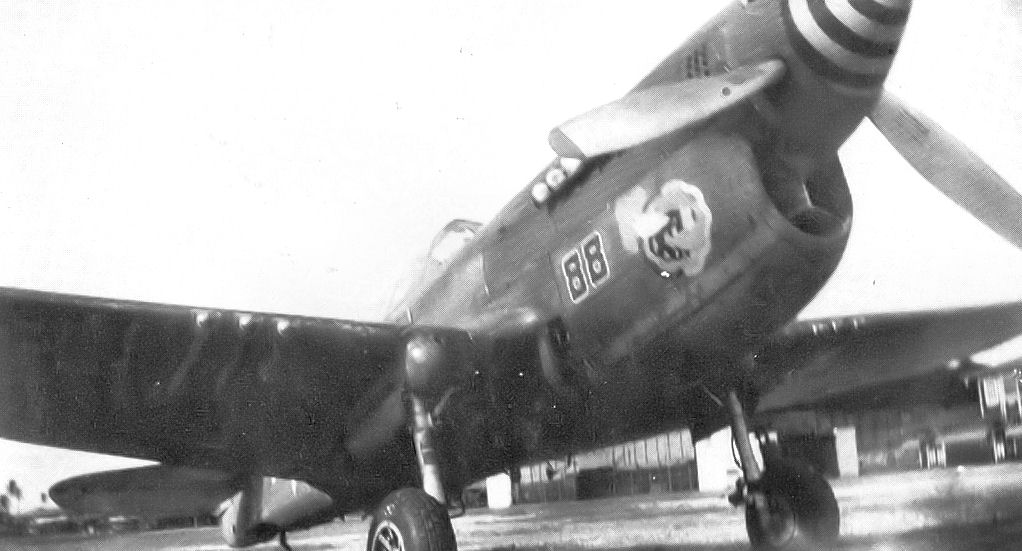
43d Fighter Squadron P-40N Warhawk, Howard Field, Canal Zone, May 1944

It was re-established in 1939 as the 43d Pursuit Squadron (Interceptor) and activated on 1 February 1940 at Albrook Field, Panama Canal Zone. This unit was part of the build-up of the Canal Zone's defenses as war approached. Assigned to the 16th Pursuit Group (Interceptor), and equipped with Curtis P-36A Hawks. In July 1941, the squadron began to convert from P-36As to new Curtiss P-40 Warhawks and, upon completion of this conversion, "A" Flight was transferred to the Top Secret "Project X" on 18 August. This, of course, was the reinforcement of Trinidad. Another flight later moved on to Zandery Field, Surinam, by January 1942.

After the Japanese Attack on Pearl Harbor, the unit moved to La Joya #1 (Pacora) Airfield in Panama in January 1942. In Panama, the squadron was assigned to the Panama Interceptor Com¬mand (PIC). Re-designated as the 43d Fighter Squadron on 13 June 1942. On 20 August, the squadron began re-equipping with the new Bell P-39 Airacobra, while the Zandery Field and Trinidad detachments remained. active with P-40Cs On 1 September the detachments aircraft were reassigned to the XXXVI Fighter Command, Antilles Air Task Force, although its personnel returned home to the main body of the squadron.

Operating air defense patrols throughout 1943 from La Joya, on 9 February 1944, the squadron finally moved to Howard Field, having been deployed to an auxiliary base longer than any other Squadron in Sixth Air Force. In March, the squadron was selected to serve as a "model" squadron for the Brazilian 1st Fighter Squadron, which was in training with the 30th Fighter Squadron at Aguadulce Field. During this operational observation, four Brazilian officers and 36 enlisted men were briefly attached to the squadron. Moved back to Howard Field in August 1943. One more move was made to France Field on 10 January 1945, replacing the 32d Fighter Squadron.

Unit activities ran down with the end of the war in Europe in May 1945. The squadron ceased all flying activities in June. By October 1945, the squadron was reduced to a non-operational administrative organization. Inactivated on 15 October 1946.

=== Vietnam War ===
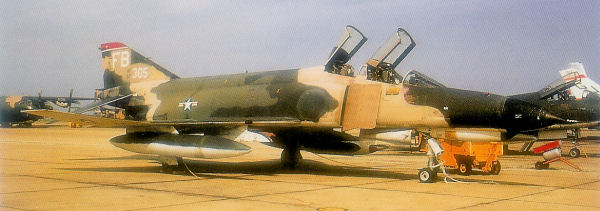
McDonnell Douglas F-4E-35-MC Phantom II, AF Serial No. 67-0305 of the 43d TFS

The squadron lay dormant nearly two decades before it was awakened as the 43d Tactical Fighter Squadron at MacDill Air Force Base, Florida, in January 1964 flying the F-84 Thunderstreak. The Hornets converted from the F-84 to the F-4 Phantom II, and in August 1965, deployed to Clark Air Base, Philippines, where they were in reserve support to the 47th Tactical Fighter Squadron who were flying combat missions over Southeast Asia from Ubon Royal Thai Air Force Base, Thailand.

In November 1965, the Hornets became the first fighter squadron assigned to Cam Ranh Air Base, South Vietnam, with an advance party arriving on 28 October. During its time in Southeast Asia, the squadron flew 1,207 combat missions and earned the Air Force Outstanding Unit Award for its service. In January 1966, the 43rd TFS returned to MacDill AFB, to serve as an F-4 replacement-training unit until March 1970.

=== Alaskan service ===
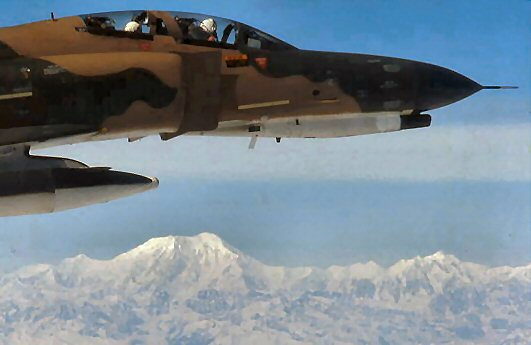
43rd F-4 flying near Denali about 1977

In June 1970, the 43 TFS was moved to Elmendorf Air Force Base, Alaska, under the 21st Composite Wing, and from 1991 the 21st Tactical Fighter Wing. The squadron was one of two units assigned to Alaskan Air Command. Flying the F-4E Phantom II, the 43d inherited a dual mission of Alaskan air defense and close air support for U.S. Army forces. In addition to flying out of Elmendorf AFB in Anchorage, the squadron also sat air defense alert at King Salmon and Galena Air Force Stations.

The squadron assumed North American Aerospace Defense Command air defense alert in October 1970 and between 1970 and 1982, the squadron's pilots intercepted more than 100 Soviet aircraft in Alaskan air space. In 1977 the 43rd TFS won the Hughes Trophy for the best air-to-air squadron in the United States Air Force.

In 1982, the 43 TFS began converting to the McDonnell Douglas F-15A Eagle. Without help from a combat ready unit, the squadron developed its own F-15 training program and completed the first ever F-15 low runway condition reading tests. The squadron continued to provide air defense for North America until 1 January 1994, when it was inactivated.

=== Return to fighter training ===
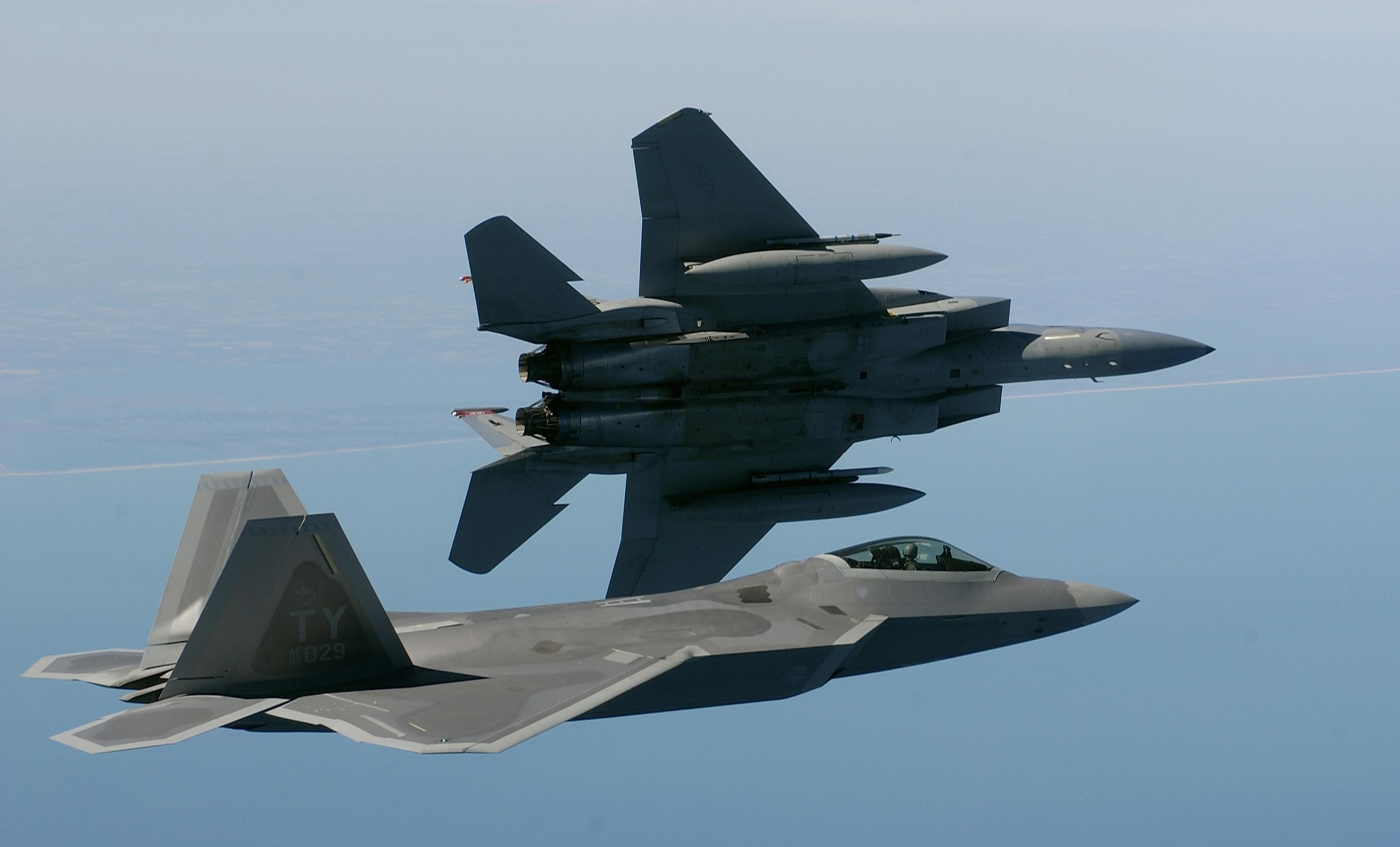
An F-22 observes as an F-15 Eagle banks left. The F-22 was slated to replace the F-15C/D.

On 25 October 2002, The 43d Fighter Squadron was reactivated with a new mission and a new aircraft. Assigned to the 325th Fighter Wing, Air Education and Training Command, Tyndall Air Force Base, Florida, the 43 FS is the first squadron to provide training for Air Force pilots in the F-22 Raptor. The squadron transitioned to Air Combat Command when the 325th Fighter Wing assumed an operational mission, but the 43 FS continued to train Raptor pilots.

After Hurricane Michael severely damaged Tyndall in 2018, the squadron was relocated to nearby Eglin Air Force Base. The F-22 pilot training mission was transferred to the 71st Fighter Squadron at Langley Air Force Base in 2023 and the unit was inactivated that year.

== Lineage ==
43rd Aero Squadron

- Organized as the 43rd Provisional Squadron on 13 June 1917

Redesignated 43rd Aero Squadron on 26 June 1917
Demobilized on 17 April 1919

- Reconstituted and consolidated with the 43rd School Squadron on 8 April 1924

43rd Pursuit Squadron

- Authorized as the 43rd School Squadron on 10 June 1922

Organized as the 43rd Squadron (School) on 7 July 1922
Redesignated 43rd School Squadron on 25 January 1923
Consolidated with the 43rd Aero Squadron on 8 April 1924
Redesignated 43rd Pursuit Squadron on 1 March 1935
Inactivated on 1 September 1936
Disbanded on 1 January 1938

- Consolidated with the 43rd Tactical Fighter Squadron on 27 March 1964 effective 22 December 1939

43rd Fighter Squadron

- Constituted as the 43rd Pursuit Squadron (Interceptor) on 22 December 1939

Activated on 1 February 1940
Redesignated: 43rd Fighter Squadron on 15 May 1942
Redesignated: 43rd Fighter Squadron, Single Engine on 12 April 1944
Redesignated: 43rd Fighter Squadron, Two Engine on 13 January 1945
Redesignated: 43rd Fighter Squadron, Single Engine on 8 January 1946
Inactivated on 15 October 1946

- Redesignated 43rd Tactical Fighter Squadron, activated and organized on 8 January 1964
- Consolidated with the 43rd Pursuit Squadron on 27 March 1964 effective 22 December 1939

Redesignated 43rd Fighter Squadron on 26 September 1991
Inactivated on 1 January 1994

- Activated on 1 October 2002

Inactivated on c. 30 September 2023

=== Assignments ===
- Unknown, 13 June – 24 August 1917
- Fairfield Aviation General Supply Depot, 25 August 1917
- Unknown, 18 December 1917 – 24 October 1918
- Air Service Replacement Concentration Barracks, 25 October 1918
- 3d Aviation Instruction Center, 1 November–c. 5 January 1919
- Commanding General, Services of Supply, January–17 April 1919
- 10th Group (School) (later 10th School Group), 7 July 1922
- Air Corps Advanced Flying School, 16 July 1931
- 3d Wing (attached to Air Corps Advanced Flying School), 1 March 1935 – 1 September 1936
- 16th Pursuit Group (later 16th Fighter Group), 1 February 1940
- XXVI Fighter Command, 1 November 1943
- 6th Fighter Wing, 25 August – 15 October 1946
- 15th Tactical Fighter Wing, 8 January 1964 (attached to 405th Fighter Wing, c. 20 August 1965, 12th Tactical Fighter Wing, 1 November 1965-c. 4 January 1966)
- 21st Composite Wing, 15 July 1970
- 343d Tactical Fighter Group, 15 November 1977
- 21st Tactical Fighter Wing, 1 January 1980
- 21st Operations Group, 26 September 1991
- 3d Operations Group, 19 December 1991 – 1 January 1994
- 325th Operations Group, 1 October 2002 – c. 30 September 2023

=== Stations ===
- Camp Kelly (later Kelly Field, Texas, 13 June 1917
- Wilbur Wright Field, Ohio, 25 August 1917
- Ellington Field, Texas, 18 December 1917 – 17 February 1918
- South Carlton, England, 16 March 1918 (Note: Detachments at Hooton Park, Grantham, and Beaulieu, after 14 August 1918.)
- Codford, England, 14 October 1918
- St. Maixent, France, 25 October 1918
- Issoudun Aerodrome, France, 1 November 1918
- Bordeaux, France, c. 6 January – 18 March 1919
- Hazelhurst Field, New York, c. 5–17 April 1919
- Kelly Field, Texas, 7 July 1922 – 1 September 1936
- Albrook Field, Panama Canal Zone, 1 February 1940
- La Joya Airfield, Panama, 13 July 1942
- Howard Field, Panama Canal Zone, 9 February 1944
- La Chorrera Airfield, Panama, 6 April 1944
- Howard Field, Panama Canal Zone, 29 August 1944
- France Field, Panama Canal Zone, 10 January 1945 – 15 October 1946
- MacDill Air Force Base, Florida, 8 January 1964

Deployed at Clark Air Base, Philippines, c. 20 August – 31 October 1965
Deployed at Cam Ranh Air Base, South Vietnam, 1 November 1965 - c. 4 January 1966

- Elmendorf Air Force Base, Alaska, 15 July 1970 – 1 January 1994
- Tyndall Air Force Base, Florida, 1 October 2002 – 10 September 2018
- Evacuated to Eglin Air Force Base, Florida, 10 September 2018 – c. 30 September 2023

=== Aircraft ===
- Probably Curtiss R-4 (1917–1918)
- Probably Curtiss JN-4 (1917–1918)
- Airco DH.4 (1918)
- SPAD S.XIII (1918)
- Royal Aircraft Factory S.E.5 (1918)
- Thomas-Morse MB-7 (1922–1929)
- Curtiss AT-4 (1922–1929)
- Curtiss AT-5 (1922–1929)
- Curtiss P-1 Hawk (1928–1935)
- Boeing PW-9 (1929–1931)
- Boeing P-12 (1932–1936)
- Curtiss P-36 Hawk (1940–1941)
- Curtiss P-40 Warhawk (1941–1942, 1943–1945)
- Bell P-39 Airacobra (1942–1944)
- Lockheed P-38 Lightning (1945–1946)
- Republic P-47 Thunderbolt (1946)
- Republic F-84 Thunderjet (1964)
- McDonnell F-4 Phantom II (1964–1982)
- McDonnell Douglas F-15 Eagle (1982–1993)
- Lockheed Martin F-22 Raptor (2002–2023)

== See also ==
- List of American Aero Squadrons
