= Air Forces Panama =

USAF Southern Air Division 830th Air Division

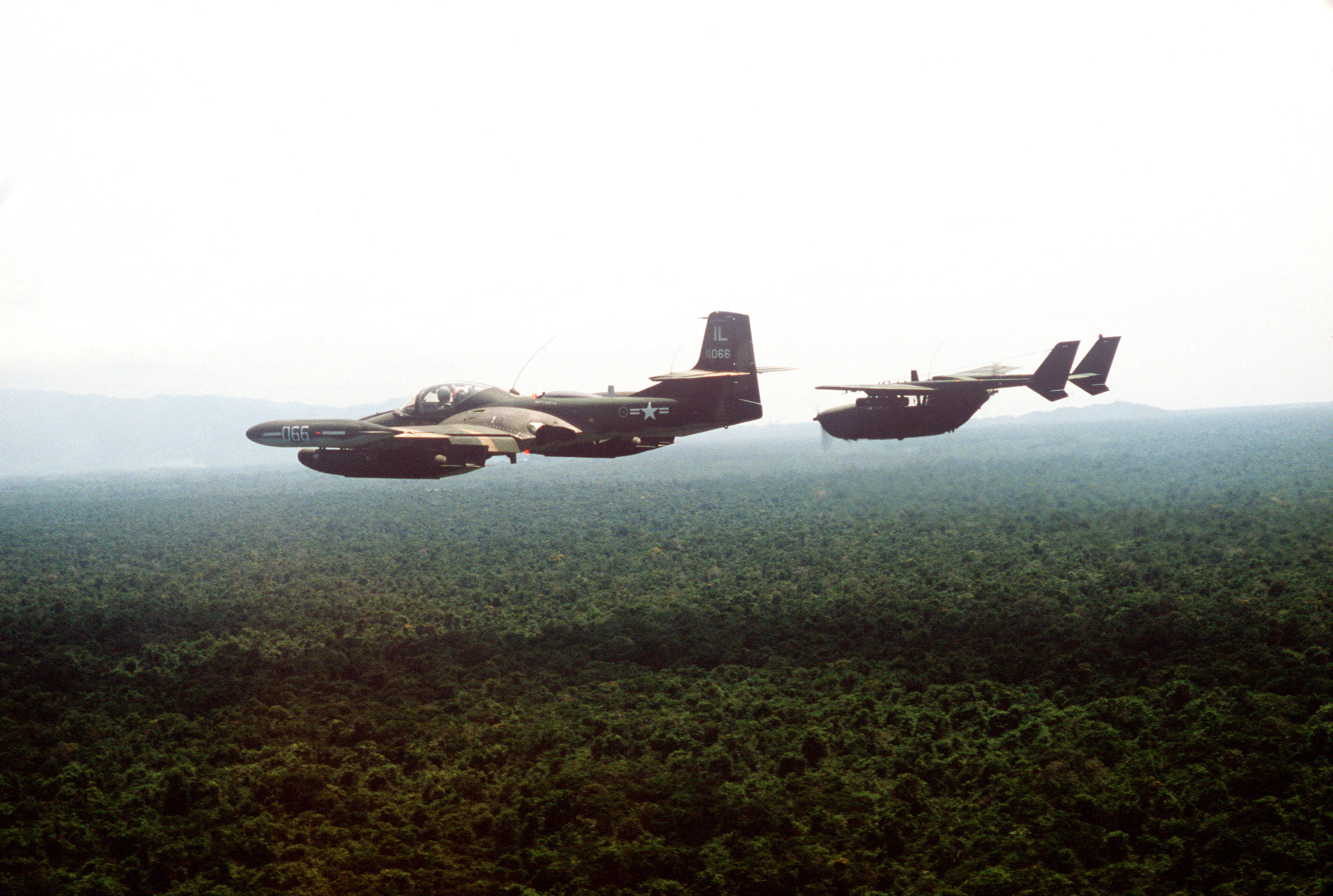
- Cessna OA-37 and Cessna O-2A over Honduras in 1984
- Active: 1976–1992
- Country: United States; Panama
- Branch: United States Air Force
- Role: Command of regional air forces
- Part of: Tactical Air Command
- Decorations: Air Force Outstanding Unit Award; Air Force Organizational Excellence Award

Insignia
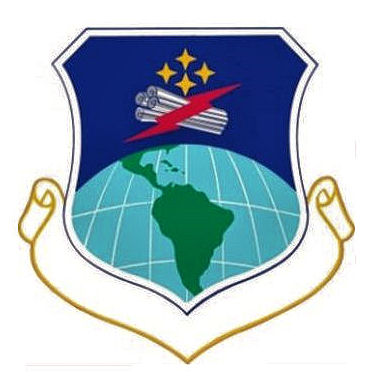
- Air Forces Panama emblem (Approved for Southern Air Division) (Note: The heraldic description of the emblem is: Azure, issuing from base a demi-globe light blue gridlined argent below four rolled parchments arraswise of the second and of the third surmounted by a lightning bolt bendsinisterwise gules below four mullets of four points palewise one, two, and one or, all within a diminished bordure argent.)

Air Forces Panama is an inactive United States Air Force (USAF) headquarters. It was assigned to Tactical Air Command, most recently to Twelfth Air Force. Its headquarters were located at Albrook Air Force Station and Howard Air Force Base in the Panama Canal Zone (later Panama). The organization was inactivated on 11 February 1992.

The unit was activated as the USAF Southern Air Division in 1976 to replace the United States Southern Command Air Forces as the USAF component of United States armed forces in the Panama Canal Zone. Southern Command Air Forces was simultaneously disestablished as a Major Command and USAF responsibility for South and Central America was transferred to Tactical Air Command. It was also renamed the 830th Air Division before receiving its final designation. After the transfer of the Panama Canal Zone to Panama, its remaining responsibilities were transferred to the 24th Wing, one of its former components.

The unit served during a period when USAF presence in Panama was gradually reduced, with some of its functions and organizations transferred to locations in the United States or discontinued. It operated its own aircraft, primarily in a forward air control and training mission, but also relied on airlift and fighter aircraft and crews rotating to its bases from other units. Although it focused on USAF representation, including training and foreign military sales, the unit also participated in Operation Just Cause and provided forces for Operations Desert Shield and Desert Storm.

== History ==
Air Forces Panama was first activated at Albrook Air Force Station as USAF Southern Air Division, which replaced United States Air Forces Southern Command as the United States Air Force (USAF) component of the United States Armed Forces in the Panama Canal Zone in January 1976. The division commander was also "dual-hatted" as the vice commander of United States Air Force Southern Command. (Note: The Commander of Twelfth Air Force was the commander of United States Air Force Southern Command, which replaced the former major command.)

The division also managed United States Air Force relationships with the Air Forces of friendly Latin American countries. One aspect of these relationships was the Foreign Military Sales program. It assisted Mexico in Mexico's purchase of Northrop F-5 Freedom Fighters. In 1984 the division delivered Lockheed T-33 T-Birds to Ecuador and Cessna A-37 Dragonflys to the Dominican Republic. Many of the Foreign Military Sales programs were given operation names using the word "Peace" as their first element. (Note: Examples included Peace Pelican (C-130As for Bolivia), Peace Amazon (F-5s for Brazil), Peace Emerald II (AC-47s for Colombia), Peace Bonito (F-5s for Honduras), Peace Cargo (C-130As and T-33s for Mexico) and Peace Delta III (maintenance of F-16s for various nations). Abstract, USAF Southern Air Division History 1988.)

=== Aircraft ===
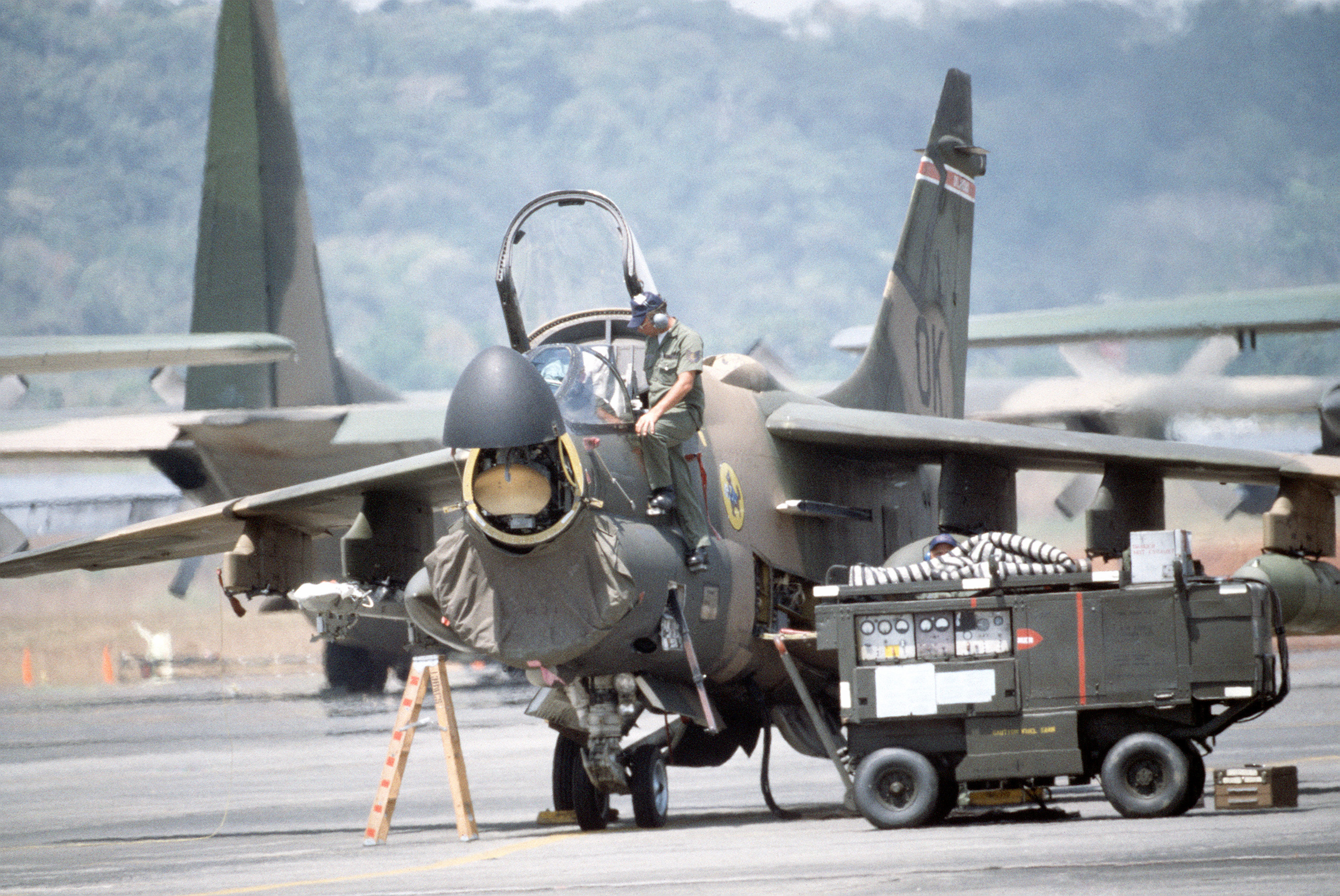
A-7D of the 138th Tactical Fighter Group in Panama 1983

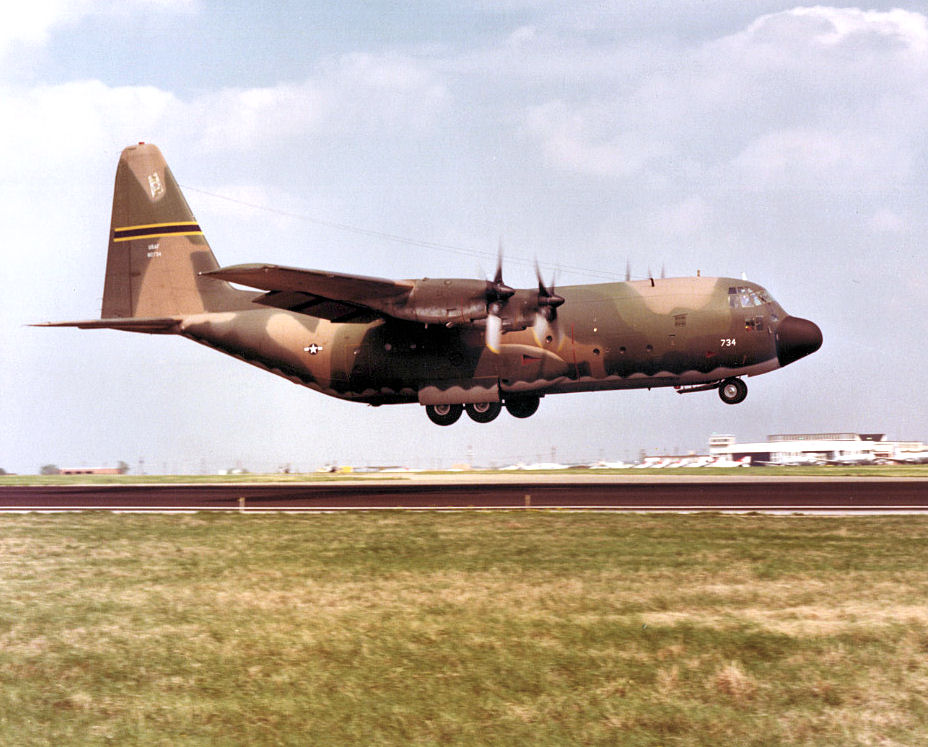
C-130 of the Air National Guard (Note: Aircraft is Lockheed C-130B-LM of the 181st Tactical Airlift Squadron Serial 58-0734.)

The division provided air defense of the Panama Canal, controlling fighter aircraft rotated through Howard Air Force Base. Initially, these were LTV A-7 Corsair IIs rotating from units of Tactical Air Command, but in January 1978, the responsibility for providing these planes shifted to the Air National Guard under Operation Coronet Cove. The National Guard also deployed Fairchild Republic A-10 Thunderbolt IIs after 1985. In 1990, the A-7s were replaced by McDonnell Douglas F-15 Eagles and General Dynamics F-16 Fighting Falcons.

Lockheed C-130 Hercules aircraft also rotated to Panama for airlift support in the region. When the division activated, these aircraft were provided by active units of Military Airlift Command, in Operation Volant Oak. In October 1977, this mission was also transferred to the Guard, along with units of the Air Force Reserve. Since 1975, USAF airlift management had been centralized with Military Airlift Command (MAC), which had established the 1300th Military Airlift Squadron at Howard in March 1975. After October 1984, the division provided support to the 61st Military Airlift Group, whose 310th Military Airlift Squadron replaced the 1300th Military Airlift Squadron and operated several types of aircraft, including the Volant Oak Lockheed C-130 Hercules and the Alenia C-27 Spartan STOL aircraft.

=== Disaster and humanitarian relief ===
On occasion the division provided disaster relief assistance to Latin American nations using assigned and rotational aircraft and forces. In 1979, during the Sandinista insurrection in Nicaragua, the division evacuated United States embassy personnel, American citizens and third country nationals from Nicaragua. In 1988 Volant Oak C-130s were dispatched to Jamaica to provide relief after Hurricane Gilbert struck the island. Similar relief operations were conducted in Antigua following Hurricane Hugo in 1989. Other counties that received this type of support included Guatemala, the Dominican Republic, Panama and Colombia.

=== Training foreign air forces ===
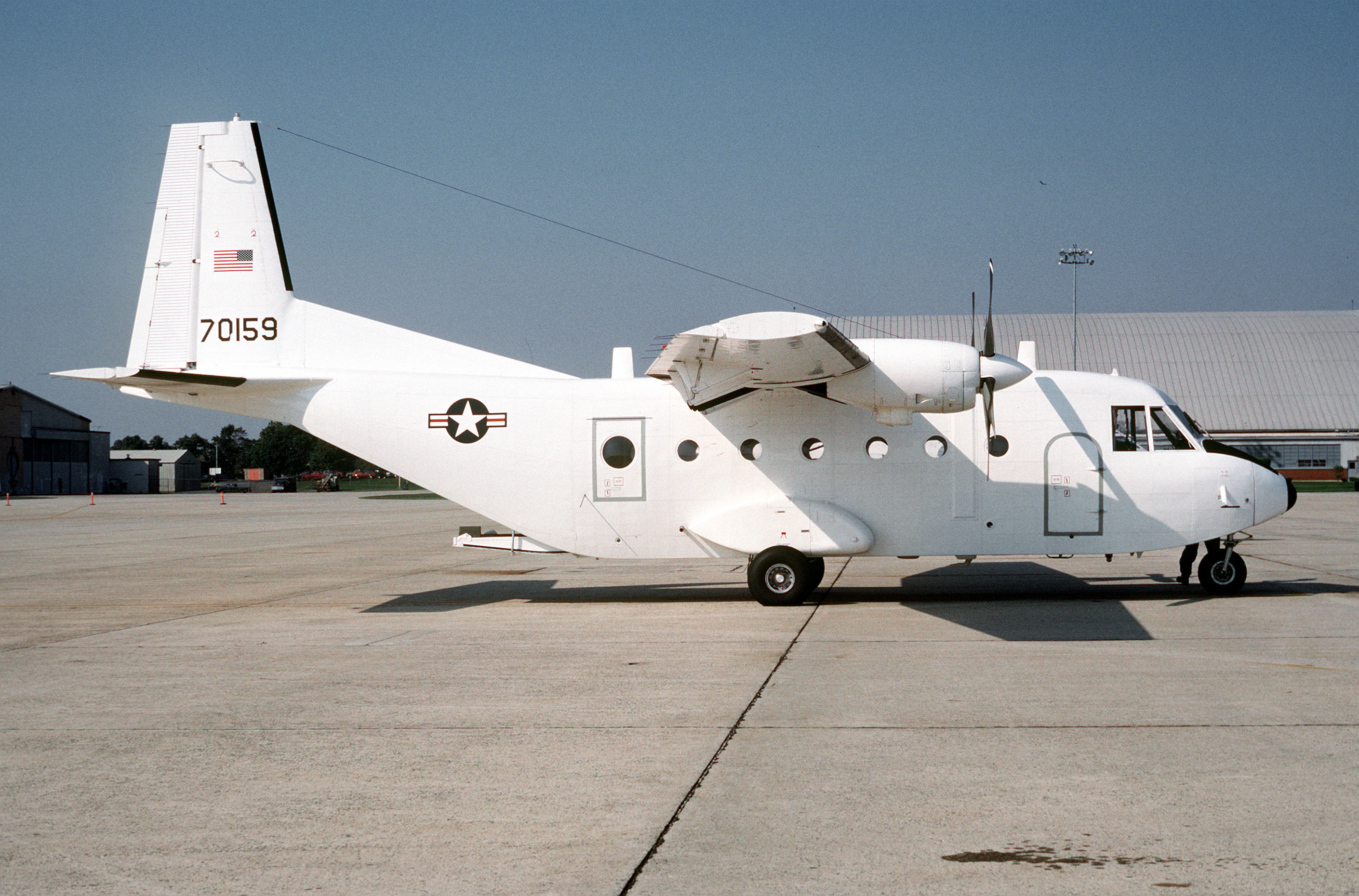
CASA C-212 as operated by civilian contractor for 830th AD

The division's foreign military sales responsibilities gave it the mission of training recipients on the equipment they purchased. For example, it trained Mexican technicians in logistics and maintenance for the new F-5s aircraft their country had purchased. Not all training was performed at the divisions bases in the Canal Zone. The division deployed mobile technical training units to Colombia, the Dominican Republic, Ecuador, El Salvador and Honduras. Division A-37 aircraft were used to conduct pilot training.

The Inter-American Air Forces Academy was assigned to the division. The Academy provided technical training and education for airmen and officers from approximately fourteen Latin American countries The academy also maintained a center for translating USAF training publications into Spanish for use by Latin American countries. In October 1989, the academy moved to Homestead Air Force Base, Florida and was reassigned from the division.

=== Other operations ===
The division participated in various training exercises,. Joint exercises included paratroop drops and close air support for Army troops. It also conducted numerous combined exercises with various Latin American countries. The division also became involved in counternarcotics operations.

Following the ouster of the Shah of Iran in the Islamic Revolution in February 1979, the Shah was temporarily removed to Contadora Island, Panama in December using aircraft assigned to the division. That year also saw the division performing hot weather testing of the Boeing E-4B Airborne Command Post aircraft.

In December 1989, division aircraft, particularly OA-37s of the 24th Tactical Air Support Squadron flew missions supporting Operation Just Cause, the American effort to oust Manuel Noriega as the president of Panama. Noriega was taken into custody for trial on drug related charges and the operation was terminated on 11 January 1990. The 24th Squadron flew 372 sorties during Just Cause. Unlike other OA-37s in the Air Force inventory, the 24th's Dragonflies retained a full attack capability because one of the squadron's missions was training Latin American pilots on both the attack and observation versions of the aircraft.

The following year, the division deployed OA-37 Forward Air Controllers to Southwest Asia for Operation Desert Shield. Its pilots continued to serve in Southwest Asia as battalion air liaison officers during Operation Desert Storm, even as the squadron was being inactivated at its home station.

=== Reorganizations ===
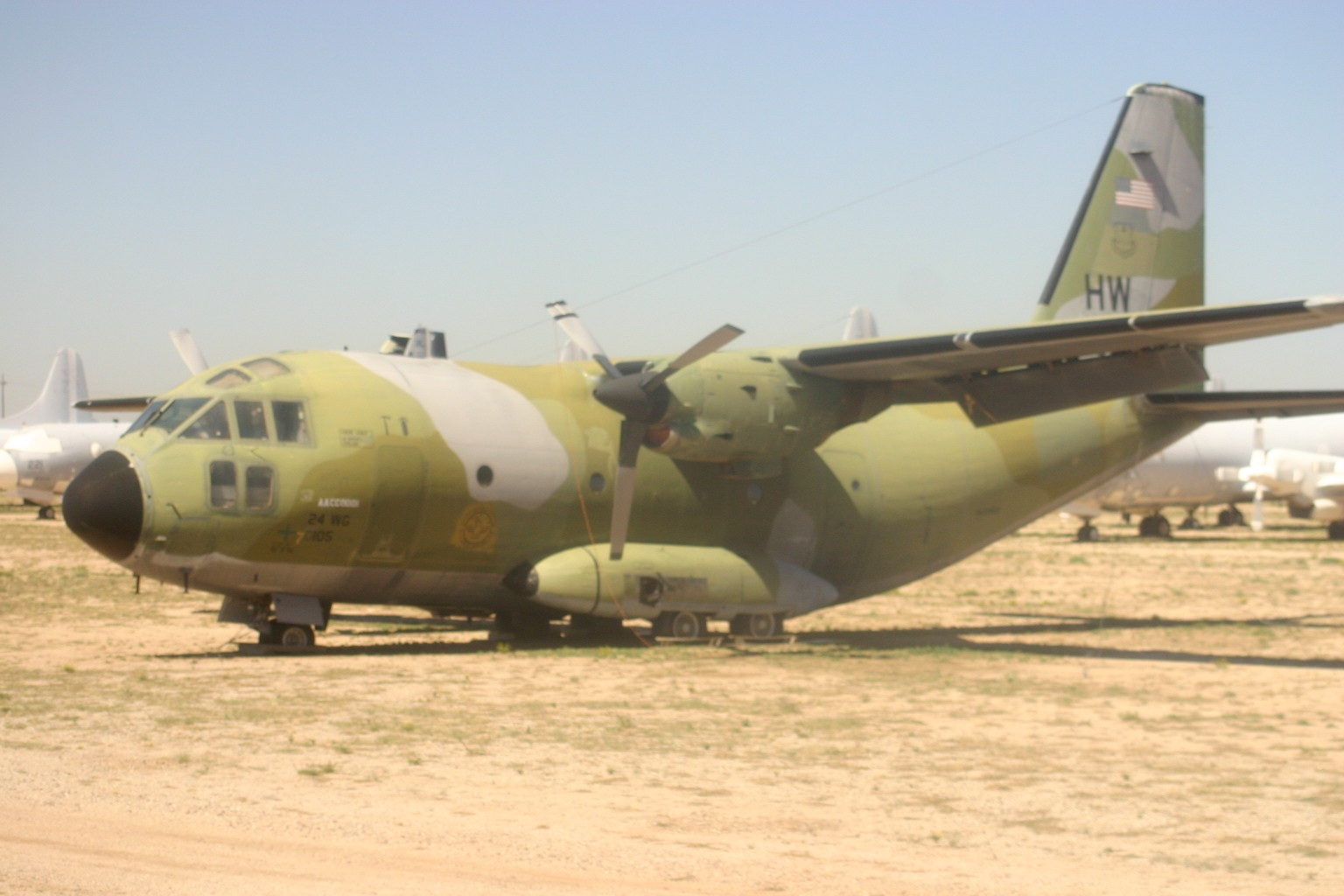
C-27A from Howard AFB

In January 1987, the unit's command relationships were shuffled and it focused on its mission in Panama, losing its responsibility for managing relationships with Latin American countries as it was reassigned to Twelfth Air Force. At the same time, its 24th Composite Wing was inactivated and the wing's subordinate units at Howard Air Force Base were assigned directly to the division and Col Harold E. Watson, the 24th Wing's commander became the division commander. .

Much of the January 1987 reorganization was reversed two years later, when the name of the division changed to the 830th Air Division and the 24th Composite Wing was again activated. The division also became United States Southern Command Air Forces's forward element with the reorganization, ending the previous arrangement in which the division commander was also the deputy commander of that command. The 630th Aircraft Control and Warning Squadron, which had been activated in 1988 and assigned to the division to manage the Caribbean Basin Radar Network Southern Regional Operations Center was transferred to the 24th Wing. Three months later, the division returned to Albrook Air Force Station from Howard after an absence of almost twelve years.

1990 saw continuing reductions in the division's footprint in Panama as its Directorate of Latin American Affairs moved to Twelfth Air Force at Bergstrom Air Force Base and the Permanent Secretariat of the System of Cooperation Among the American Air Forces joined the Inter-American Air Forces Academy at Homestead.

In February 1991, the division became Air Forces Panama and once again assumed responsibility for the subordinate units of the 24th Composite Wing, which was inactivated. The takeover of the 24th Wing's responsibilities resulted in a move of headquarters to the 24th's former location at Howard. The assignment of the 24th Tactical Air Support Squadron lasted only two weeks, as it was inactivated on 1 March. The 24th Squadron was the last unit in the regular Air Force to operate the OA-37.

Air Forces Panama was inactivated in February 1992 when responsibility for its area was assumed by Twelfth Air Force and it was replaced in Panama by the 24th Wing, which was once again activated and its commander, Brigadier General David Oakes became the commander of the wing.

== Lineage ==
- Established as the USAF Southern Air Division on 24 November 1975

Activated on 1 January 1976
Redesignated 830 Air Division on 1 January 1989
Redesignated Air Forces Panama on 15 February 1991
Inactivated on 11 February 1992

=== Assignments ===
- Tactical Air Command, 1 January 1976
- Twelfth Air Force, 31 January 1987 – 11 February 1992

=== Stations ===
- Albrook Air Force Station, Panama Canal Zone, 1 January 1976
- Howard Air Force Base, Panama Canal Zone, 15 August 1977
- Albrook Air Force Station, Panama, 1 March 1989
- Howard Air Force Base, Panama, 15 February 1991 – 11 February 1992

=== Components ===
==== Wing ====
- 24th Composite Wing: 1 January 1976 – 31 January 1987, 1 January 1989 – 15 February 1991

==== Groups ====
- 24th Combat Support Group: 31 January 1987 – 1 January 1989, 15 February 1991 – 11 February 1992
- 24th Medical Group (see USAF Clinic, Howard)
- 1978 Communications Group (later 24th Communications Group): 1 September 1990 – 1 October 1991

==== Squadrons ====
- 24th Air Base Operability Squadron, 15 August 1988 – 1 January 1989 (not operational)
- 24th Comptroller Squadron, 15 August 1988 – 1 January 1989, 15 February 1991 – 11 February 1992
- 24th Consolidated Aircraft Maintenance Squadron, 31 January 1987 – 1 January 1989, 15 February 1991 – 11 February 1992
- 24th Supply Squadron, 31 January 1987 – 1 January 1989
- 24th Tactical Air Support Squadron: 31 January 1987 – 1 January 1989, 15 February – 1 March 1991
- 630th Aircraft Control & Warning Squadron (later 24th Air Support Operations Squadron), 1 April 1988 – 1 January 1989; 15 February 1991 – 11 February 1992
- 4400 Air Postal Squadron, 31 January 1987 – 1 January 1989, 15 February – 15 November 1991

==== Other ====
- Inter-American Air Forces Academy: 1 January 1976 – 1 October 1989
- USAF Clinic, Howard (later 24th Medical Group), 31 January 1987 – 1 January 1989, 15 February 1991 – 11 February 1992

=== Commanders ===
- Maj Gen James M. Breedlove, 1 January 1976
- Maj Gen Robert B. Tanguy, 6 April 1977
- Brig Gen Thomas E. Wolters, 27 June 1980
- Maj Gen William E. Masterson, 1 February 1981
- Maj Gen Henry D. Canterbury, 13 December 1984
- Col Harold E. Watson, 17 January 1987
- Brig Gen Robin G. Tornow, 22 June 1988
- Brig Gen David Oakes, 24 May 1990 – c. 11 February 1992

=== Aircraft ===
Rotational aircraft

- LTV A-7 Corsair II, 1974–1990
- Fairchild Republic A-10 Thunderbolt II, 1985-c.1988
- Lockheed C-130 Hercules, 1976–1984
- McDonnell Douglas F-15 Eagle, 1990–1992
- General Dynamics F-16 Fighting Falcon, 1990–1992

Assigned aircraft

- Cessna A-37 Dragonfly, 1985–1992
- Cessna O-2 Skymaster, 1976–1986
- Bell UH-1 Huey, 1976–1986 (Note: The division also operated civilian contractor CASA C-212 Aviocar aircraft from the late 1980s until 1 October 1991 that were stationed at Howard. Abstract History 830 Air Division [1991].)

=== Awards and campaigns ===
Award streamer	Award	Dates	Notes
	Air Force Outstanding Unit Award	20 December 1989 – 14 February 1991	830th Air Division
	Air Force Organizational Excellence Award	1 February 1981 – 31 January 1983	USAF Southern Air Division
	Air Force Organizational Excellence Award	1 January 1986 – 31 December 1987	USAF Southern Air Division

Campaign Streamer	Campaign	Dates	Notes
	Just Cause	20 December 1989 – 31 January 1990	830th Air Division, Panama

== See also ==
- List of United States Air Force air divisions
- System of Cooperation Among the American Air Forces
- Organization of American States
- Military Assistance Program
- List of C-130 Hercules operators
