= United States Air Forces Southern Command =

Inactive U.S. Air Force major command

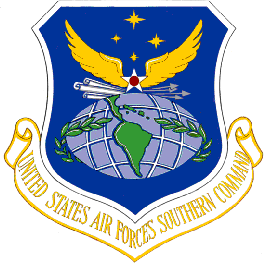
- USAF Southern Command emblem
- Active: 20 November 1940 – 1 January 1976 (35 years, 1 month) Detailed: 8 July 1963 – 1 January 1976 (as United States Air Forces Southern Command) 31 July 1946 – 8 July 1963 (as Caribbean Air Command) 18 September 1942 – 31 July 1946 (as Sixth Air Force) 5 August 1941 - 18 September 1942 (as Caribbean Air Force) 20 November 1940 – 5 August 1941 (as Panama Canal Air Force)
- Country: United States
- Branch: United States Air Force
- Type: Major Command
- Garrison/HQ: Howard Air Force Base, Panama
- Engagements: World War II - Antisubmarine

Commanders
- Notable commanders: Hubert R. Harmon

The United States Air Forces Southern Command is an inactive Major Command of the United States Air Force. It was headquartered at Albrook Air Force Base, Canal Zone, being inactivated on 1 January 1976.

Initially designated Panama Canal Air Force when first established in October 1940, its mission was the defense of the Panama Canal. Later it took on United States Air Force relations, including foreign military sales (FMS) and disaster relief assistance, with the Latin American nations. The command supported disaster relief to countries such as Guatemala, Jamaica, Nicaragua, the Dominican Republic, Panama and Colombia. It also assisted states in Central and South America in purchases of United States military aircraft and trained their technicians in logistics and maintenance for the aircraft.

== History ==
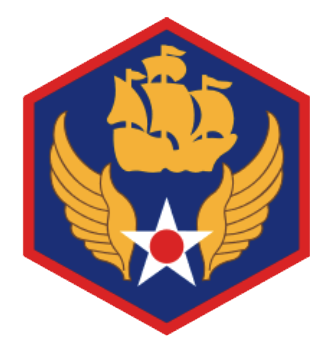
Sixth Air Force (1942–1946) Emblem

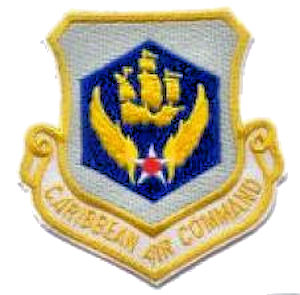
Caribbean Air Command (1946–1963) Emblem

The initial U.S. Army air forces that were established in Panama in February 1917 were under the control of HQ U.S. Army Troops in the Panama Canal Zone, and, when the Panama Canal Department was formed in 1917, came under that headquarters.

France Field was the first permanent Army aerodrome in the Canal Zone. But by 1932 it had becoming too small for the numbers of aircraft being assigned to the Canal Zone, as well as having a poor landing surface; offering no room for expansion; and providing little defense for the Pacific entrance to the Panama Canal. A second permanent army airfield, Albrook Field was therefore opened that year. A third airfield, Howard Field was built on the Canal Bruja Point Military Reservation, opening on 1 December 1939. By 1940, a rapid increase in the number of flying squadrons in both the Canal Zone as well as in Panama as a result of the pre–World War II mobilization of the Air Corps warranted a new organization, and the Panama Canal Air Force was created as a major command.

After several organizational changes, Sixth Air Force became the controlling USAAF authority for the Caribbean, Central America, and South America. Through all these redesignations it was part of the Caribbean Defense Command, (10 February 1941 – 1 November 1947), which was the senior United States Army headquarters in the Canal Zone. The Caribbean Interceptor Command, was the Air Force component (10 February 1941 – 17 October 1941) of the CIC until being inactivated and replaced by VI Interceptor Command.

=== World War II ===
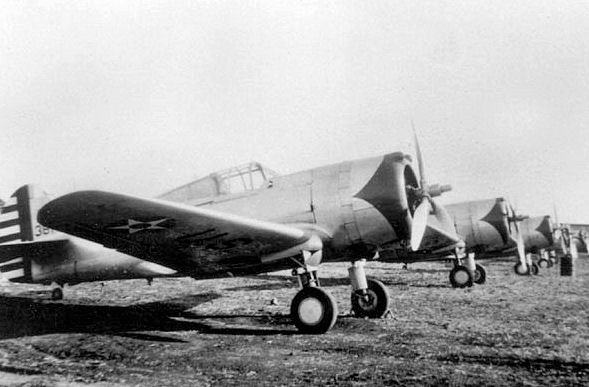
32d Pursuit Squadron P-36 Hawks at Ponce Field, Puerto Rico, 1941

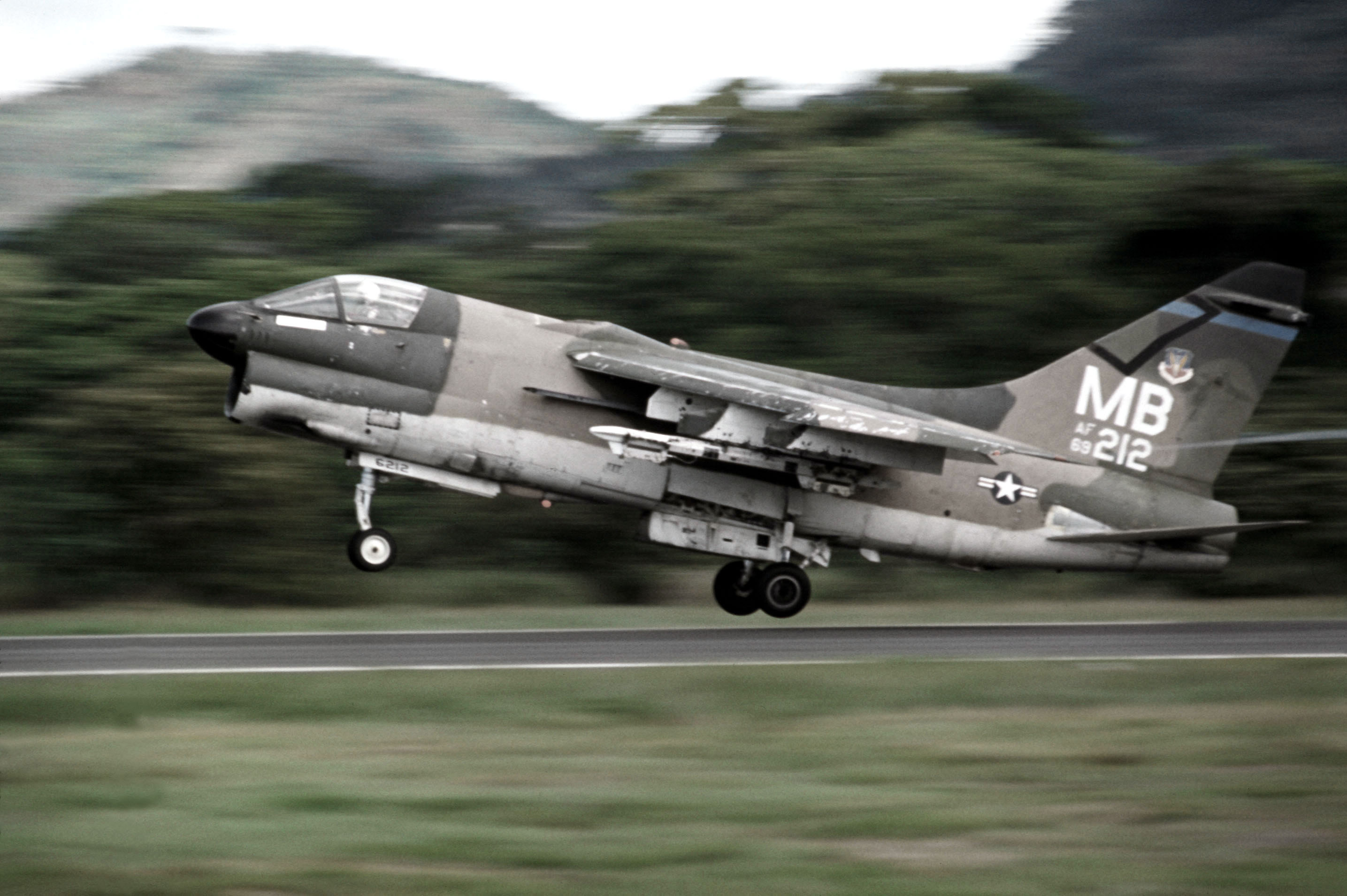
An A-7D of the 355 TFS/354 TFW takes off from Howard AFB in the Panama Canal Zone during a 1977 deployment.

In early 1942 the Nazi Germany's Kriegsmarine, began anti-shipping operations using U-boats in the Caribbean. The subs sank several tankers in the harbor at Sint Nicholaas, Aruba and even shelled an oil refinery on the island. The refineries at the island of Aruba and Curaçao possessed oil from wells in Venezuela, and accounted for one-third of the Allies' supply of gasoline.

The first wartime mission of the newly created Sixth Air Force was to perform antisubmarine operations in the Caribbean and the Gulf of Mexico areas and to cover Allied shipping convoys in the area. The Sixth Air Force expanded throughout the Caribbean and Latin America, stationing units from Cuba in the north to British Guiana and Surinam on the northern coast of South America to protect the Venezuelan oilfields. Air bases were established along the western coast of South America, in Peru, Ecuador as well as in the Galápagos Islands, Panama, Guatemala and Costa Rica. In order to protect the vital Air Transport Command South Atlantic Air Route to Europe and North Africa, Sixth Air Force combat units were stationed in Brazil to patrol the South Atlantic air routes.

Sixth Air Force had the responsibility for tracking down submarine wolfpacks, which consisted of groups of three of more subs attacking Allied shipping using a strategy now known as "Search and Destroy". As most shipping in the Caribbean was not in defensive convoys, aerial surveillance of the area was crucial to their safety. However, in the fall of 1942 the German Navy changed tactics and reduced their submarine activity in the Caribbean region to concentrate its activity on the North Atlantic convoy route and the approaches to northwest Africa. With the withdrawal of submarines from the Caribbean region the Sixth Air Force concentrated its efforts as a striking force on its primary function of guarding against possible attacks on the Panama Canal.

=== Post-war mission ===
With the end of the war, most of the wartime Caribbean air bases used for antisubmarine patrols were returned to civil authorities in late 1945 or early 1946. The Lend-Lease air bases from Great Britain, which were on 99-year leases were reduced to skeleton units and used largely as MATS weather stations. They were all closed for budgetary reasons in 1949.

The postwar Sixth Air Force, redesignated Caribbean Air Command as part of the 1946 USAAF reorganization, and its successor units returned to its prewar mission, the defense of the Panama Canal; support for friendly Latin American air forces, and to provide support to Latin American nations engaged in anti-communist activities during the Cold War. Howard Air Force Base became a focus for military air support, with many surplus USAF aircraft being transferred to Latin American air forces there, as well as the establishment of the Inter-American Air Forces Academy, which provided technical training and education for airmen and officers from approximately 14 Latin American countries.

In the post Vietnam War drawdown of the USAF, the United States Air Forces Southern Command was inactivated in 1976 for budgetary reasons. Most of its functions and resources passed to the Tactical Air Command, which established the USAF Southern Air Division (later 830th Air Division; Air Forces Panama) as the USAF component of the United States Armed Forces in the Panama Canal Zone.

=== Lineage ===
- Established as Panama Canal Air Force on 19 October 1940
- Activated as a Major Command on 20 November 1940

Redesignated as Caribbean Air Force on 5 August 1941
Redesignated as 6th Air Force on 18 September 1942
Redesignated as Caribbean Air Command on 31 July 1946
Redesignated as United States Air Forces Southern Command on 8 July 1963

- Inactivated as a Major Command on 1 January 1976

=== Units assigned ===
- Commands

VI Bomber Command, 25 October 1941 – 1 November 1946
VI Interceptor Command, 17 October 1941

Redesignated as: VI Fighter Command, May 1942 – October 1943

XXVI Fighter Command, 6 March 1942 – 25 August 1946
XXXVI Fighter Command, 21 August 1942 – 30 April 1943
VI Air Force Service Command, Undetermined (included Panama Air Depot at Albrook Army Airfield)
Antilles Air Command, 11 July 1941 – 22 January 1949

- Wings

6th Fighter Wing, 25 August 1946 – 28 July 1948
13th Composite Wing, 1 November 1940 – 25 October 1941
19th Composite Wing, 25 January 1933

Redesignated: 19 Wing on 14 July 1937
Redesignated: 19 Bombardment Wing on 19 October 1940 – 25 October 1941

23d Fighter, 25 April – 24 September 1949
24th Composite, 1967–1976
36th Fighter Wing, 2 July 1948 – 13 August 1948

Attached to 6th Fighter Wing, 2–28 July 1948

5600 Wing, later 5600 Composite Wing, 26 July 1948 - undetermined
5620 Wings
5700 Composite, 1948–1949; Air Base, 24 October 1954 – 8 November 1967
5900 Wing

- Groups

25th Bombardment Group, 1 November 1940 – 25 October 1941
32d Pursuit Group, 1 January 1941 – 18 September 1942
36 Pursuit Group (Interceptor), 3 June – 25 October 1941
37th Pursuit Group (Interceptor), 19 November 1940 – 18 September 1942
53d Fighter Group, 1 January – 6 March 1942

- Squadrons

4th Tactical Reconnaissance Squadron, 25 August 1946 – 1 February 1948
20th Transport Squadron, 15 December 1940 – 20 September 1948

Attached to: 314th Troop Carrier Group [later, 314th Troop Carrier Group, Heavy; 314th Troop Carrier Group, Medium], c. November 1946-16 June 1948

=== Stations ===
- Permanent

Albrook Air Force Station, Canal Zone, 1932–1976
France Air Force Base, Canal Zone, 1917–1949
Howard Air Force Base, Canal Zone, 1939–1976
Rio Hato Army Air Base, Panama, 1931–1948
Borinquen (later Ramey) Air Force Base, Puerto Rico, 1936–1971

(Assigned to Strategic Air Command, 26 May 1949)

- Wartime/Lend-Lease

Aguadulce Army Airfield, Panama, 1941–1945
Anton Army Airfield, Panama, 1943
Arecibo Field, Puerto Rico, 1941–1943
Atkinson Air Force Base, British Guiana

APO 602, Antilles Air Command, 1941–1948

Batista Army Airfield, Cuba, 1942–1943

APO 632, Caribbean Base Command, Transferred to Air Transport Command, June 1943

Beane Air Force Base, Saint Lucia, 1941–1949
Belém Army Airfield, Brazil, 1941–1945
Benedict Army Airfield, Saint Croix, 1941–1942
Calzada Larga Army Airfield, Panama, 1942–1944
Camaguey Air Base, Cuba, 1942–1944
Camden Auxiliary Air Base, Trinidad, 1942-1949
Carlsen Air Force Base, Trinidad, 1941–1949
Chame Army Airfield, Panama, 1942–1945
Coolidge Air Force Base, Antigua, 1941–1949
Saint Thomas Airport, Saint Thomas, 1942–1943
Dakota Army Airfield, Aruba, 1942–1944

APO 811, Antilles Air Command

David Army Airfield, Panama, 1941–1945
Edinburgh Field, Trinidad, 1942-1949

APO 687, Antilles Air Command

Guatemala City Air Base, Guatemala, 1941–1949
Hato Army Airfield, Curaçao, 1942-1945

APO 812, Antilles Air Command

La Chorrera Army Airfield, Panama, 1941–1944
Losey Army Airfield, Puerto Rico, 1941–1944
Madden Army Airfield, Panama, 1944
Patilla Point Army Airfield, Panama, 1944
Piarco Airport, Trinidad, 1941–1943
Pocri Army Airfield, Panama, 1944
Salinas Army Airfield, Ecuador, 1942–1943

APO 661. Sixth AF, Also used by United States Navy

Seymour Island Army Airfield, Galápagos Islands, 1942–1945

APO 662. Sixth AF, Closed 26 April 1945

Talara Army Airfield, Peru, 1942–1943

APO 817, Sixth AF (Limited use until 1947 by AAFCS)

Vernam Air Force Base, Jamaica, 1941–1949
Waller Air Force Base, Trinidad, 1941–1949

APO 695/803 Antilles Air Command

Zandery Army Airfield, Surinam, 1941–1946

== List of commanders ==
No.	Commander		Term		
No.	Portrait	Name	Took office	Left office	Term length
1	Frank M. Andrews	Major General; Frank M. Andrews	6 December 1940	19 September 1941	287 days
2	Davenport Johnson	Major General; Davenport Johnson	19 September 1941	23 November 1942	1 year, 65 days
3	Hubert R. Harmon	Major General; Hubert R. Harmon	23 November 1942	8 November 1943	350 days
4	Ralph H. Wooten	Brigadier General; Ralph H. Wooten	8 November 1943	16 May 1944	190 days
5	Edgar P. Sorensen	Brigadier General; Edgar P. Sorensen	16 May 1944	21 September 1944	128 days
6	William O. Butler	Major General; William O. Butler	21 September 1944	24 July 1945	306 days
7	Earl H. DeFord	Brigadier General; Earl H. DeFord	24 July 1945	1 February 1946	192 days
8	Hubert R. Harmon	Major General; Hubert R. Harmon	1 February 1946	4 October 1947	1 year, 245 days
-	Glen C. Jamison	Brigadier General; Glen C. Jamison; Acting	4 October 1947	13 November 1947	40 days
9	Willis H. Hale	Major General; Willis H. Hale	13 November 1947	20 October 1949	1 year, 341 days
10	Rosenham Beam	Brigadier General; Rosenham Beam	20 October 1949	15 November 1950	1 year, 26 days
11	Emil C. Kiel	Brigadier General; Emil C. Kiel	15 November 1950	11 June 1953	2 years, 208 days
12	Reuben C. Hood	Major General; Reuben C. Hood	11 June 1953	20 June 1956	3 years, 9 days
13	Truman H. Landon	Major General; Truman H. Landon	20 June 1956	3 August 1959	3 years, 44 days
14	Leland S. Stranathan	Major General; Leland S. Stranathan	3 August 1959	11 September 1963	4 years, 39 days
15	Robert A. Breitweiser	Major General; Robert A. Breitweiser	11 September 1963	6 August 1966	2 years, 329 days
16	Reginald J. Clizbe	Major General; Reginald J. Clizbe	6 August 1966	14 June 1968	1 year, 313 days
17	Kenneth O. Sanborn	Major General; Kenneth O. Sanborn	14 June 1968	7 April 1972	3 years, 298 days
18	Arthur G. Salisbury	Major General; Arthur G. Salisbury	7 April 1972	October 1974	c. 2 years, 191 days
19	James M. Breedlove	Major General; James M. Breedlove	October 1974	1 January 1976	c. 1 year, 78 days
