= William Ormond Butler =

US Army Air Force major general (1895–1962)

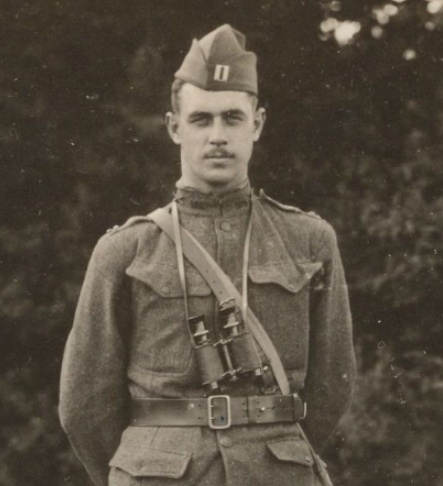
- As commander of Company B, 2nd Balloon Squadron, in Forêt de la Reine, France, July 1918
- Born: 23 September 1895; Marshall, Virginia, U.S.
- Died: 29 October 1962 (aged 67); Alamo, California, U.S.
- Burial place: Marshall Cemetery, Marshall, Virginia, U.S.
- Military career
- Allegiance: United States
- Branch: Field Artillery (1917–1920); United States Army Air Corps (1920–1946)
- Service years: 1917–1946
- Rank: Major General
- Nickname: Bruce
- Commands: Sixth Air Force; Eastern Flying Training Command; Eleventh Air Force
- Conflicts: World War I; Western Front; World War II; Aleutian Islands campaign
- Awards: Legion of Merit (2); Croix de guerre 1914–1918

William Ormond "Bruce" Butler (23 September 1895 – 29 October 1962) was a United States Army Air Force major general. He graduated from the United States Military Academy at West Point, New York, in April 1917 and was commissioned in the Field Artillery Branch. After service on the Western Front in World War I, he transferred to the United States Army Air Corps in 1920. During World War II, he commanded the Eleventh Air Force in Alaska.

== Early life ==
William Ormond "Bruce" Butler was born in Marshall, Virginia, on 23 September 1895, the son of Robert Ormond Butler, an engineer, and Mary McGeorge née Hume. They returned to Mary's ancestral home in Marshall for the birth of each of their three children. The family was living in Marietta, Ohio, where Butler's father was engaged in the construction of a new dam, when Butler heard that Congressman George White was conducting examinations for entry to the United States Military Academy at West Point, New York. Butler passed the examination and secured an alternative appointment, and ultimately secured an admission.

== World War I ==
Butler entered West Point on 14 June 1913. He played American football as a lineman on the West Point Cadets football team, which won the annual Army–Navy Game in all four years that he played. His class graduated early, on 20 April 1917, two weeks after the American entry into World War I, with Matthew Ridgway, J. Lawton Collins and Mark W. Clark, all future generals, and William Kelly Harrison Jr. and Daniel Noce, future lieutenant generals, being among his fellow graduates. He was ranked 33rd in the class of 139 cadets and was commissioned as a Second Lieutenant in the 6th Field Artillery Regiment.

Promoted to first lieutenant on 15 May 1917, Butler joined the 6th Field Artillery Regiment in Douglas, Arizona, on 12 June. The regiment formed part of the First Expeditionary Division of the American Expeditionary Force (AEF), which departed for France on 28 July. While en route, Butler was promoted to the temporary rank of Captain (temporary) in the Field Artillery Branch on 5 August.

From 1 September to 15 October, Butler underwent aerial observer training in Valdahon, France. He went to the Lorraine front, where he was an observer with the French 73rd Balloon Company from 1 to 20 November. This was followed by duty at the training center at Gondrecourt-le-Château. He returned to the front on 22 December as aerial observer with the French 91st Balloon Company west of Toul. He was cited for exceptionally meritorious and efficient service by Général de division Fénelon François Germain Passaga, the commander the French XXXII Army Corps, and was awarded the French Croix de guerre 1914–1918. On 1 March 1918, Butler returned to the AEF as the commander of Company B, 2nd Balloon Squadron.

Butler returned to the United States in July 1918 and became an instructor at the U.S. Army Balloon School at Lee Hall, Virginia with the rank of major in Air Service from 17 August 1918. He became the first member of West Point class to join the Air Service.

== Between the wars ==
After the war ended, Butler returned to the Field Artillery. In November 1919, he was transferred to Camp Pike, Arkansas, where he commanded a battalion of the 10th Field Artillery Regiment. On 5 January 1920, he entered the Field Artillery School at Fort Sill, Oklahoma, from which he graduated on 7 December. He was promoted to the substantive rank of captain in the Field Artillery on 25 August 1919, and reverted to that rank on 13 February 1920.

Butler transferred to the Air Service on 1 July 1920. He went to Langley Field, Virginia, where he attended the Airship School. On completing the flying course there, he remained as a flying instructor until 30 June 1922, and commanded the 19th Airship Company until 31 August 1925. He was a student officer at the Air Service Primary Flying School at Brooks Field, Texas, from 12 September 1925 to 4 January 1926, and at the Air Service Advanced Flying School at Kelly Field, Texas, where he completed the Special Observation Course from 4 January to 18 March 1926. He was now rated as an airship pilot, a balloon observer, and an air observer. He commanded the 12th Airship Company at Scott Field, Illinois, 28 May 1926 to 6 April 1929.

On 25 May 1929, Butler departed for the Philippines, where he was the post exchange officer of the 4th Composite Group at Nichols Field from 15 June 1929 until 15 February 1930. He commanded the 66th Service Squadron there until 1 July 1930, and then was executive Officer of Nichols Field and 4th Composite Group until 18 June 1931, when he returned to the United States.

Butler attended the Air Corps Tactical School at Maxwell Field, Alabama, from which he graduated on 12 June 1932, ranked third in his class. He was promoted to major in the Air Corps on 1 August 1932. He then attended the United States Army Command and General Staff College at Fort Leavenworth, Kansas, from 25 August 1933 to 22 June 1935; this time he was ranked top of his class. He attended the Air Corps Flying School at Randolph Field and Kelly Fields, and graduated as a rated airplane pilot on 7 October 1936. While there, he was promoted to the temporary rank of lieutenant colonel on 26 August. From 1 January 1937 to 6 June 1938, Butler was the commander of France Field in the Panama Canal Zone.

== World War II ==
In June 1939, Butler became executive officer of the 5th Air Base at Hamilton Field, California. In March 1940 he went to March Field, California, as executive Officer of the 1st Bombardment Wing. He then became chief of staff of the Fourth Air Force there on 4 December. He was promoted to colonel on 16 October 1940 and brigadier general on 14 March 1942.

Butler became Commanding General of the Eleventh Air Force at Fort Richardson, Alaska, on 24 March 1942, with the rank of major general from 25 October 1942. In October 1943, Butler was designated the Deputy Commander of the Allied Expeditionary Air Force. He was awarded the Legion of Merit for this service. He returned to the United States in April 1944 as commander of the Army Air Forces Eastern Flying Training Command. In September 1944, he assumed command of the Sixth Air Force, based in the Panama Canal Zone. He was awarded a Bronze Oak Leaf Cluster to his Legion of Merit for this service.

Butler retired from the Army on 31 January 1946 with the rank of major general due to a heart condition.

== Death and legacy ==
Over the following years, Butler was frequently hospitalised in the base hospital at Maxwell Air Force Base. He lived on a plantation in Prattville, Alabama nearby Maxwell Air Force Base. In 1962 he flew to Alamo, California, where his daughter Anne lived. He died at her home there on 29 October 1962. He was survived by his wife Helen née Daniell, daughter Anne and sons William Ormond Butler Jr. and Edwin D. Butler. He was buried in the local cemetery in his home town of Marshall, Virginia. His papers for the period from 1942 to 1945 are held by the Air Force Historical Research Agency.

== Dates of rank ==
Insignia	Rank	Component	Date	Reference
	Second Lieutenant	6th Field Artillery Regiment	20 April 1917	
	First Lieutenant	6th Field Artillery Regiment	15 May 1917	
	Captain (temporary)	Field Artillery	5 August 1917	
	Major	Air Service	17 August 1918	
	Captain	Field Artillery	25 August 1919	
	Captain (reverted)	Field Artillery	13 February 1920	
	Major	Air Corps	1 August 1932	
	Lieutenant Colonel (temporary)	Air Corps	26 August 1936	
	Lieutenant Colonel	Air Corps	1 June 1940	
	Colonel (temporary)	Air Corps	16 October 1940	
	Colonel	Army of the United States	11 December 1941	
	Brigadier General	Army of the United States	14 March 1942	
	Major General	Army of the United States	25 October 1942	
	Major General	Retired	31 January 1946	
