= XXXVI Fighter Command =

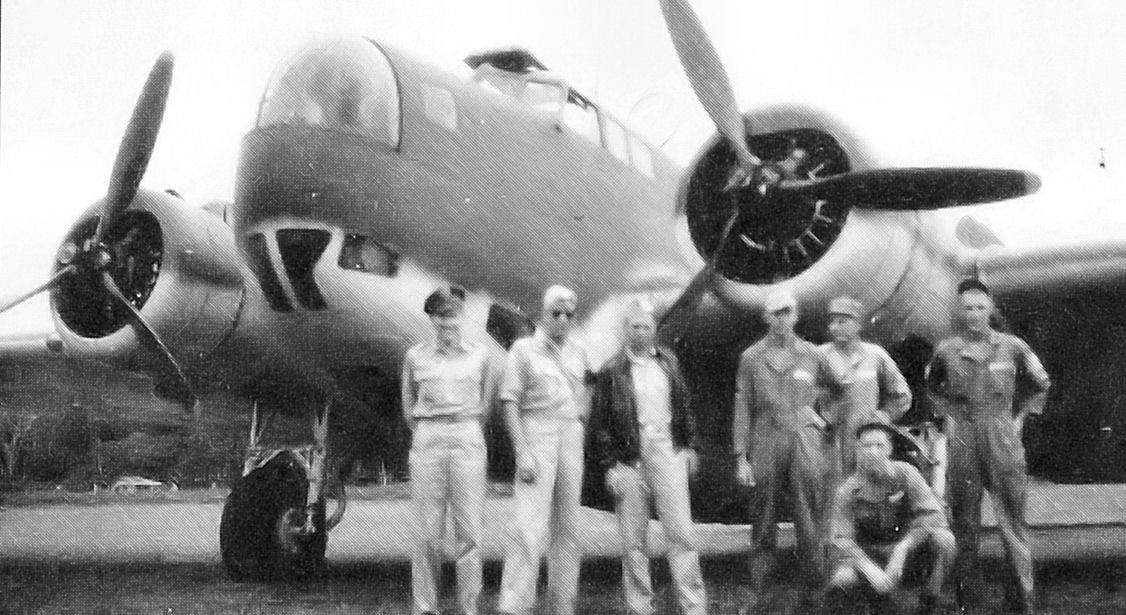
- A B-18 Bolo of the 9th Bombardment Group at Trinidad in 1942
- Active: 1942–1943
- Country: United States
- Branch: United States Air Force
- Role: Command of tactical units
- Engagements: American Theater of World War II

The XXXVI Fighter Command is a disbanded United States Air Force unit. Its last assignment was with Sixth Air Force, based at Waller Field, Trinidad, where it was disbanded on 30 April 1943.

== History ==
On 16 May 1942, Sixth Air Force established the Trinidad Detachment (Note: It was also referred to as the Trinidad Region. Hagedorn, p. 60.) of its 6th Fighter Command at Port-of-Spain, Trinidad to control operations in its Trinidad Sector. The detachment was also tasked with coordinating with the Trinidad Base Command and United States Navy elements in the sector. The detachment drew its personnel from 6th Fighter Command and the 13th Composite Wing in Puerto Rico. On 5 June, the detachment was renamed the Trinidad Detachment of the Antilles Air Task Force.

On 21 August, the 36th Fighter Command was activated on Trinidad to replace the detachment. Its attached units included both fighter and bomber units performing antisubmarine patrols and air defense missions. VI Fighter Command was redesignated the Antilles Air Task Force in March 1943 and assumed command of Army Air Forces units in the Antilles. XXXVI Fighter Command was disbanded the following month.

== Lineage ==
- Constituted as the 36th Fighter Command on 9 August 1942 (Note: Maurer indicates that the unit was constituted as the "XXXVI" Fighter Command. However, the unit was constituted and activated with an arabic number in its name. The use of roman numerals to designate Army Air Forces combat commands did not begin until September 1942. "Air Force Historical Research Agency Organizational Reconds: Types of USAF Organizations". Air Force History Index. 9 January 2008.)

Activated on 21 August 1942
Redesignated XXXVI Fighter Command c. 18 September 1942
Disbanded on 30 April 1943

=== Assignments ===
- Sixth Air Force, 21 August 1942
- Antilles Air Task Force (later Antilles Air Command), 1 March 1943– 30 April 1943

=== Stations ===
- Waller Field, Trinidad, 21 August 1942 – 30 April 1943 (Note: Hagedorn states that command headquarters was located in Port-of-Spain, rather than at the airfield. Hagedorn, p. 60.)

=== Components ===
- 9th Bombardment Group, 21 August 1942 – 30 April 1943
- 25th Bombardment Group, 15 October – 8 December 1942 (attached)
- 59th Bombardment Squadron, 21 August 1942 – 19 March 1943
- Detachment, 22nd Fighter Squadron, 1 September 1942 – 30 April 1943 (attached)
- Detachment, 43rd Fighter Squadron, 1–4 September 1942 (attached)

=== Campaign ===
Campaign Streamer	Campaign	Dates	Notes
	Antisubmarine	21 August 1942 – 30 April 1943	
