= Emil C. Kiel =

United States Air Force general (1895–1971)

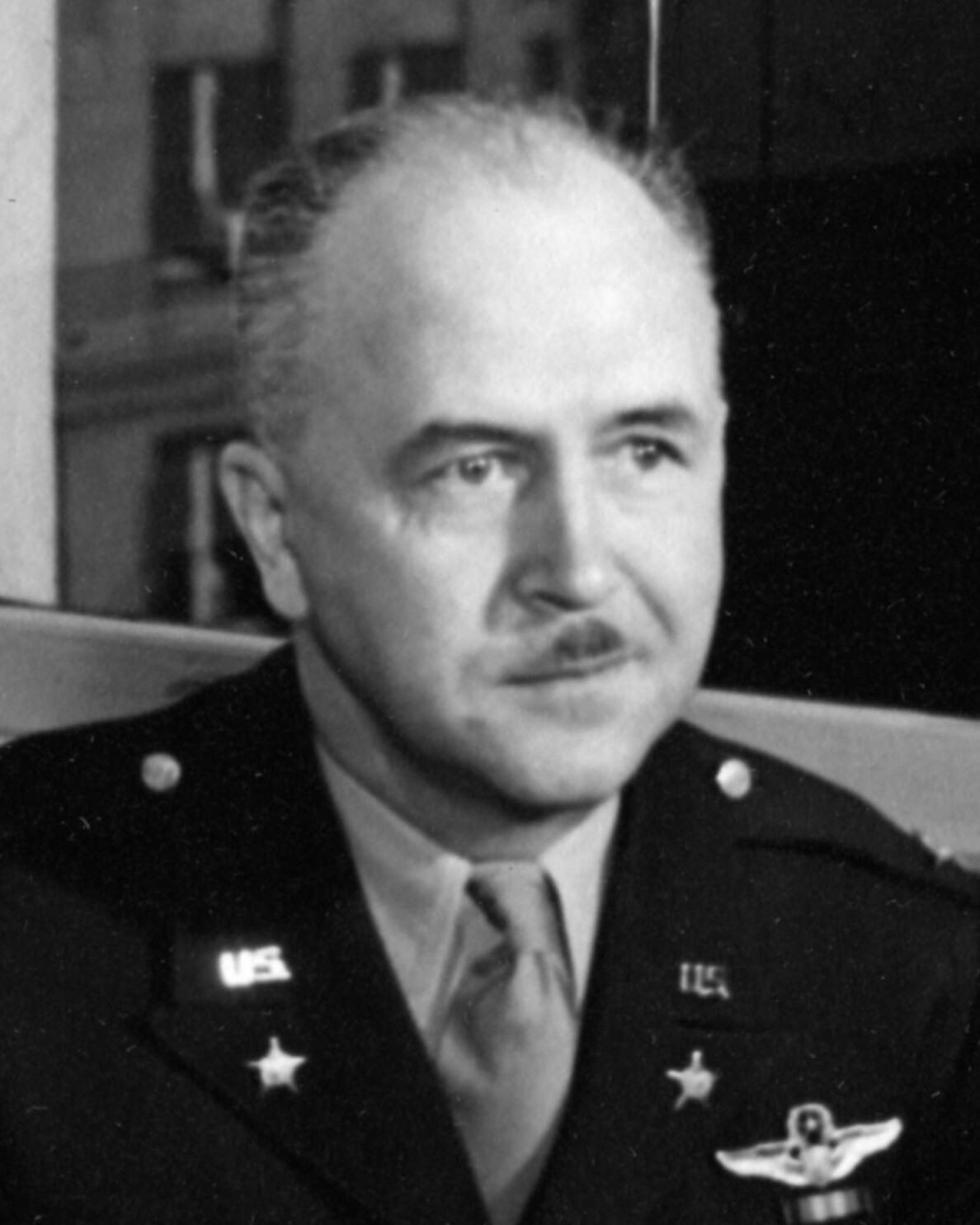
- Kiel in the 1950s
- Born: September 25, 1895; Manitowoc, Wisconsin
- Died: December 1, 1971 (aged 76)
- Military career
- Allegiance: United States of America
- Branch: United States Air Force
- Service years: World War I World War II
- Rank: Brigadier general

Emil Charles Kiel (September 25, 1895 – December 1, 1971) was a brigadier general in the United States Air Force.

== Biography ==
Kiel was born Emil Charles Kiel in Wisconsin in 1895. He would attend The Stout Institute. Kiel died on December 1, 1971.

== Career ==
Kiel joined the United States Army Reserve in 1917. He would become an aviator and be assigned as an instructor with the 91st Aero Squadron. During World War II he served in the Office of the Chief of the United States Army Air Corps before becoming Chief of Staff of the Fourth Air Force and the Eighth Air Force. Following the war he was given command of Scott Air Force Base, Sheppard Air Force Base, and Caribbean Air Command.

Awards he received include the Distinguished Service Medal, the Legion of Merit, the Bronze Star Medal, the Air Medal, and the Croix de Guerre of France. Kiel was also an Honorary Commander of the Order of the British Empire.
