= Robin G. Tornow =

United States Air Force general

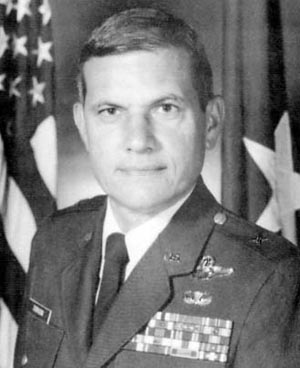
A photo of Robin G. Tornow

Robin Gene Tornow (April 20, 1942 – August 22, 2010) was a brigadier general in the United States Air Force.

== Biography ==
Tornow was born in Monroe, Wisconsin, in 1942. He attended the University of Texas at Austin. Tornow died on August 22, 2010.

== Career ==
Tornow graduated from the United States Air Force Academy in 1964. During the Vietnam War he served with the 19th Tactical Air Support Squadron. Following his service in the war he was assigned to RAF Lakenheath in England and later joined the faculty at the Air Force Academy. Later he was given command of the 334th Tactical Fighter Squadron. In 1983 he was assigned to The Pentagon and in 1986 he was given command of the 405th Tactical Training Wing. He assumed command of the United States Air Force Southern Air Division in 1988, which he headed during the United States invasion of Panama. In 1990 he was named Commandant of the Air Force Reserve Officer Training Corps. His retirement was effective as of June 1, 1993.

Awards he received include the Silver Star, the Legion of Merit with oak leaf cluster, the Distinguished Flying Cross, the Meritorious Service Medal with oak leaf cluster, the Air Medal with three silver oak leaf clusters and bronze oak leaf cluster, the Air Force Commendation Medal with oak leaf cluster, and the Army Commendation Medal.
