= Leland S. Stranathan =

United States Air Force general (1904–1983)

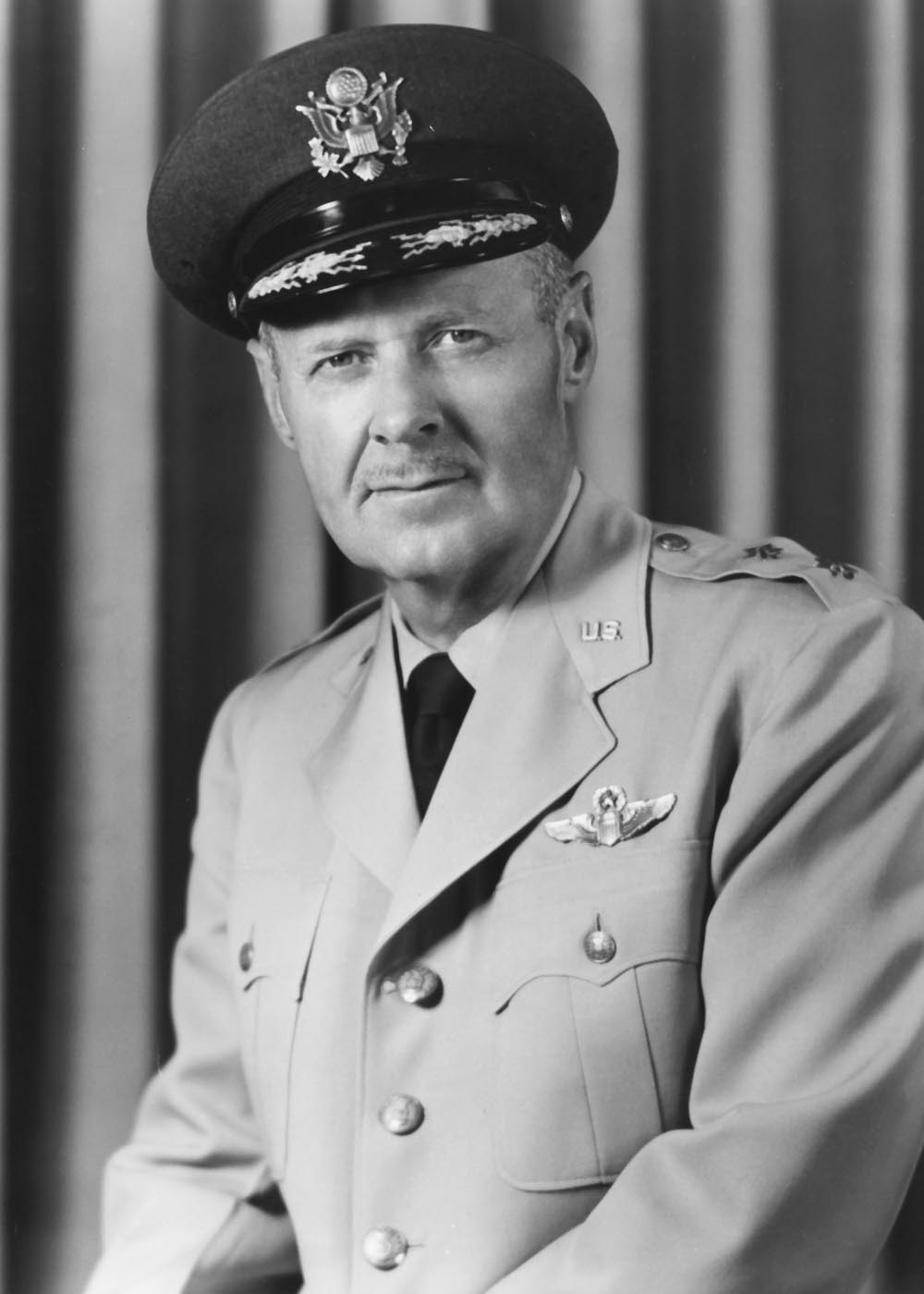
- Born: 28 June 1904; Glenwood, Iowa
- Died: 22 August 1983 (aged 79)
- Burial place: Fort Sam Houston National Cemetery
- Military career
- Allegiance: United States
- Branch: United States Army (1927–1947); United States Air Force (1947–1963)
- Service years: 1927–1963
- Rank: Major General
- Commands: Caribbean Air Command; 475th Fighter Group; 308th Bombardment Wing
- Conflicts: World War II
- Awards: Legion of Merit (2); Distinguished Flying Cross; Air Medal

Leland S. Stranathan (28 June 1904 – 22 August 1983) was a United States Air Force (USAF) general who served in Europe and the Pacific during World War II. After the war he was in charge of the Field Command, Armed Forces Special Weapons Project at Sandia Base, and the Caribbean Air Command.

== Early life ==
Leland Samuel Stranathan was born in Glenwood, Iowa on 28 June 1904. He graduated from Glenwood High School in 1921 and entered the University of Southern California later that year. He graduated in 1926 with a Bachelor of Arts degree, majoring in business administration.

Stranathan was a Flying Cadet from 28 June to 22 July 1927, and from 28 October 1927 to 31 October 1928. He was part of the first class of Primary Flying School students to go through March Field, California, after it was reactivated after World War I. His first instructor was Second Lieutenant Hoyt Vandenberg. He then attended the United States Army Air Corps Advanced Flying School bombardment course at Kelly Field, Texas, and was commissioned as second lieutenant in the Air Reserve on 22 October 1928. His first assignment was to Langley Field, Virginia.

On 2 February 1929, Stranathan received a permanent commission in the Army Air Corps, and in March was posted to Bolling Field, D.C., where his main duty was transporting dignitaries. He was promoted to first lieutenant on 1 October 1934. After serving as an instructor at Randolph Field, Texas, he commanded the 50th Observation Squadron at Luke Field in the Territory of Hawaii, from 23 March to 3 September 1937.

== World War II ==
Stranathan was promoted to captain on 2 February 1939, and graduated from the Air Corps Tactical School in 1940. He was assigned to Maxwell Field, Alabama, where he became assistant director of training on 22 August 1940. He was promoted to major on 15 March 1941, lieutenant colonel on 5 January 1942, and colonel on 1 March 1942. He was commander of Blytheville Field, Arkansas, from 1 July 1942 to 1 January 1943, and Tyndall Field, Alabama, from 1 February 1943 to 14 May 1944.

From 8 July to 1 September 1943, Stranathan was detached for service with the Eighth Air Force in England, observing flexible gunnery tactics. He returned for a second tour in England and Italy from 5 January to 10 March 1944. He served as assistant chief of staff, A-3 (Operations) of the Army Air Forces Eastern Flying Training Command at Maxwell Field from 15 May to 16 July 1944, and then became the commander of the Flexible Gunnery School at Laredo Field, Texas, until 2 December 1944.

On 14 December 1944, Stranathan became chief of staff of the 315th Bombardment Wing. This was initially located at Colorado Springs, Colorado, but it moved to Guam in March and April 1945 and became part of the Twentieth Air Force. Stranathan participated in the B-29 air raids on Japan, for which he was awarded the Distinguished Flying Cross and the Air Medal.

== Post-war ==
Stranathan commanded the 315th Bombardment Wing from 24 October to 21 December 1945, when he became its chief of staff once more, and then from 25 January to 2 April 1946. He then served as A-3 of the Fifth Air Force in Japan until 30 September. He commanded the 308th Bombardment Wing from 1 October to 31 December 1946, and then the 475th Fighter Group from 1 January to 11 June 1947. Returning to the United States, he attended the National War College, and then was deputy director of the United States Air Force (USAF) Directorate of Training and Requirements from 23 June to 26 December 1948.

From 17 January 1949 to 2 February 1950, Stranathan was the chief of the Operations and Training Division of the Armed Forces Special Weapons Project, with the rank of brigadier general from 13 September 1949. He became its deputy chief on 3 February 1950, served as the commanding general of its Sandia Base in New Mexico from 12 February to 30 April 1951, and became commander of its Field Command on 1 May 1951. He was promoted to major general on 21 May 1953.

In 1955 Stranathan became director of development planning at USAF Headquarters. He was and observer at the British nuclear tests at Maralinga in Australia in 1956. His final command, in 1959, was commanding general of the Caribbean Air Command from 3 August 1959 to 8 September 1963. He retired on 10 October 1963. He died on 22 August 1983, and was buried in Fort Sam Houston National Cemetery.

== Dates of rank ==
Insignia	Rank	Component	Date	Source
	Second Lieutenant	Air Reserve	22 October 1928	
	Second Lieutenant	Air Corps	2 February 1929	
	First Lieutenant	Air Corps	1 October 1934	
	Captain	Air Corps	2 February 1939	
	Major (temporary)	Army of the United States	15 March 1941	
	Major	Army of the United States	10 October 1941	
	Lieutenant Colonel (temporary)	Army of the United States	5 January 1942	
	Lieutenant Colonel	Army of the United States	1 February 1942	
	Colonel	Army of the United States	1 March 1942	
	Colonel	Army of the United States (Air Corps)	7 July 1942	
	Colonel	Army of the United States	6 July 1943	
	Major	Air Corps	2 February 1946	
	Colonel	United States Air Force	2 April 1948	
	Brigadier General (temporary)	United States Air Force	13 September 1949	
	Major General (temporary)	United States Air Force	21 May 1953	
