= 6933d Electronic Security Squadron =

The 6933rd Electronic Security Squadron was a signals intelligence unit of the United States Air Force Security Service (USAFSS). It was initially designated the 6933rd Radio Group Mobile.

During the Cold War, the U.S. Air Force established the Karamürsel Air Station, just outside the village of Karamürsel, on the Sea of Marmara in Turkey. The Station was originally built by the German Luftwaffe during World War II. The USAF opened the Station in 1957 for the 6933rd Radio Group Mobile communications operations and designated it Detachment 3 of The United States Logistics Group (TUSLOG). It was also known as Mainsite, as it exercised administrative control over at least two other sites designated Det 3-1 and Det 3-2. The site remained in operation until the late 1970s.

TUSLOG Det 3 (USAF) (6933rd RGM, USAFSS) was first established at Ankara in 1956 then moved to Karamursel and operated from 1957 to 1975. Det 3 became the 6933rd Security Wing around 1964 or 1965. Also when the 6933rd became a Wing-level unit, all of the Security Service units in Turkey plus the 6937th Communications Group (USAFSS) in Peshawar, Pakistan became subordinate units to the wing.

Fixed Operations significantly improved with the installation of a USAFSS AN/FLR-9 "Elephant Cage" antenna at the 6933rd SS, Karamursel AS, Turkey.

TUSLOG Det 3-1 was on a mountain top in Trabzon, Turkey. It was manned by the US Air Force and protected by the Turkish Army.
