= James M. Breedlove =

United States Air Force general

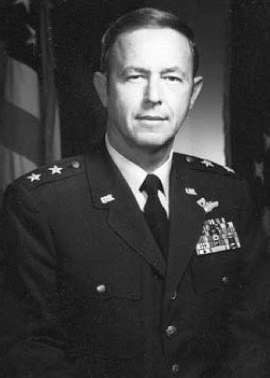
- Born: September 8, 1922; Franklin, Kentucky
- Died: January 9, 2016 (aged 93); Lubbock, Texas
- Military career
- Allegiance: United States of America
- Branch: United States Air Force
- Service years: 1947–1977
- Rank: Major general
- Commands: U.S. Air Force Southern Air Division of the Tactical Air Command

James Montgomery Breedlove (September 8, 1922 – January 9, 2016) was an American air force major general who was commander, U.S. Air Force Southern Air Division of the Tactical Air Command and deputy commander in chief, United States Southern Command, Quarry Heights, Canal Zone.

== Biography ==
Breedlove was born in Franklin, Kentucky, in 1922, where he graduated from Franklin High School in 1940. He attended Emory Junior College, Valdosta, Georgia, until June 1942, and then the University of Louisville, Kentucky. In September 1943 he entered the U.S. Military Academy at West Point, New York, and graduated in June 1947 with a Bachelor of Science degree and a commission as a second lieutenant in the U.S. Army Air Corps.

After graduation from the academy, he attended pilot training at Randolph Air Force Base, Texas, and Williams Air Force Base, Arizona. He graduated in October 1948 and was assigned as a jet fighter pilot with the 56th Fighter-Interceptor Group, Selfridge Air Force Base, Michigan. In December 1950 he was transferred to the 3625th Combat Crew Training Wing, Tyndall Air Force Base, Florida.

In December 1951, during the Korean War, Breedlove went to Korea and served with the 601st Aircraft Control and Warning Squadron at Kimpo, as a controller. He flew 39 combat missions.

In November 1952, he returned to the United States and went to Langley Air Force Base, Virginia, where he was assistant base operations officer. Later, he joined the 404th Tactical Fighter Group and performed duties as a squadron supply officer, fighter pilot, flight commander and squadron operations officer.

In December 1955, Breedlove became operations officer for the 50th Fighter-Bomber Wing at Hahn, Germany. In January 1957 he was assigned to the U.S. Air Forces in Europe as aide-de-camp to the commander in chief, and in September 1957 he became chief, Jet Aircraft Branch, Directorate of Operations.

Breedlove returned to the United States in December 1957 as assistant executive to the deputy chief of staff, operations, Headquarters U.S. Air Force, Washington, D.C. In August 1962 he entered the Armed Forces Staff College at Norfolk, Virginia. From January 1963 to January 1966, he was assigned as operations officer of the 3510th Flying Training Wing, Randolph Air Force Base, Texas, and later became director of operations.

In January 1966, General Breedlove went to England, where he attended the Imperial Defence College in London. In January 1967 he was assigned as a special assistant to the deputy chief of staff, operations, Headquarters 3d Air Force at South Ruislip. He later became deputy commander for operations, 81st Tactical Fighter Wing, at Bentwaters. In July 1968 he assumed duties as director of readiness inspection, Headquarters U.S. Air Forces in Europe, Lindsey Air Station, Germany.

General Breedlove was transferred to Thailand in June 1969 as vice commander of the 388th Tactical Fighter Wing at Korat Royal Thai Air Force Base, and assumed command of the wing in December 1969. He flew 162 combat missions with a total of 378 flying hours in the F-4E Phantom II aircraft.

In August 1970 General Breedlove was assigned as vice commander of the 3500th Pilot Training Wing at Reese Air Force Base, Texas, and assumed command of the wing in October 1970. He became deputy chief of staff, operations, Air Training Command, with headquarters at Randolph Air Force Base, Texas, in April 1971. He was assigned as deputy director, Defense Mapping Agency, Department of Defense, in August 1973.

General Breedlove assumed command of the U.S. Air Forces Southern Command in the Canal Zone in October 1974. When the Tactical Air Command assumed responsibility for USAFSO January 1, 1976, he was appointed commander, U.S. Air Force Southern Air Division of the Tactical Air Command and deputy commander in chief, U.S. Southern Command.

He was a command pilot. His military decorations and awards include the Legion of Merit with oak leaf cluster, Distinguished Flying Cross, Bronze Star Medal, Air Medal with nine oak leaf clusters, Air Force Commendation Medal with oak leaf cluster, Distinguished Unit Citation Emblem, Air Force Outstanding Unit Award Ribbon with oak leaf cluster, Republic of Korea Presidential Unit Citation, and the Royal Thai Supreme Command Forward Master Badge.

He was promoted to the grade of major general May 1, 1973, with date of rank August 5, 1969. He retired in May 1977. He later lived in Horseshoe Bay, Texas, and died in Lubbock, Texas, on January 9, 2016.
