= The Pratt and Buckingham Octagon House =

Pratt and Buckingham Octagon House
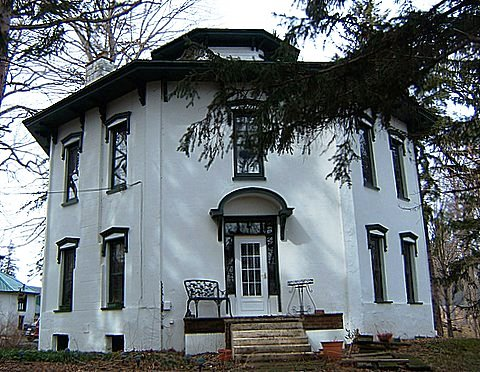
- The Pratt and Buckingham octagon house

- Location within New York The Pratt and Buckingham Octagon House (the United States)

General information
- Location: 99 Chestnut Street, Fredonia, New York
- Coordinates: 42.43879°N 79.33814°W

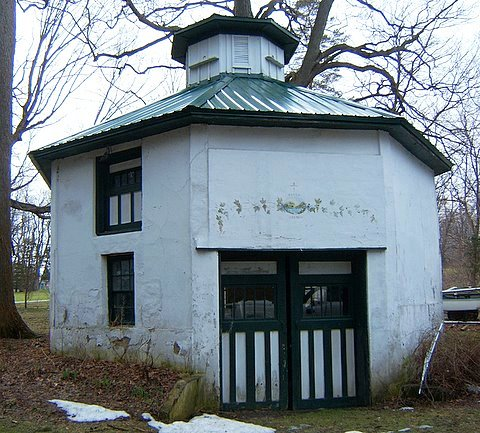
The Pratt and Buckingham octagon carriage house

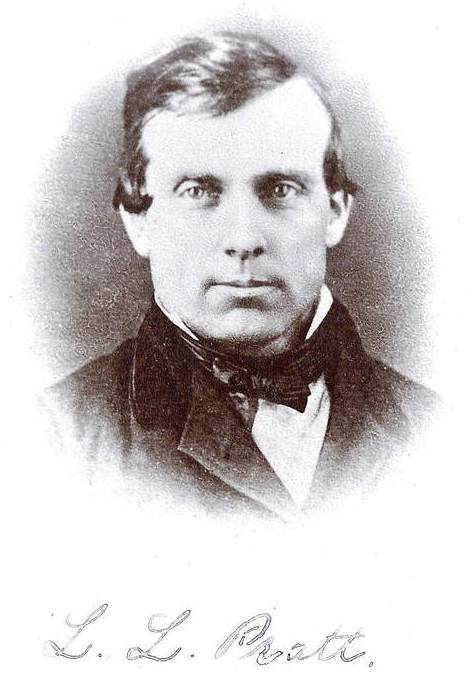
Levi L. Pratt

The Pratt and Buckingham Octagon House is a historic octagon house in Fredonia, Chautauqua County, New York that was built in ca. 1865. It is a private home at 99 Chestnut Street; the rear of the property is on Canadaway Creek.

== The site ==
The octagon house is situated on a promontory about 25 feet above and 75 feet westerly from a natural ford on Canadaway Creek. The promontory is located at the junction of the upper and lower portage trails that ran along the westerly side of the creek during Native American times. The lands in this region were occupied by the Erie people until the mid-seventeenth century, then by the Seneca people until the end of the eighteenth century. Following the Treaty of Big Tree in 1797, the lands were transferred to the Holland Land Company, which subdivided them for sale as farms. Canadaway Creek's name was derived from the Native American name pronounced "Ga-Na-Da Wa O," which was translated as "running through the hemlocks." The Seneca settlement of Ga Na Da Wa O extended from Lake Erie southerly to Laona, New York, and the later village of Fredonia and city of Dunkirk, New York were known as the settlement of Canadaway from 1809 to 1817.

== Construction and design ==
According to tax and census records, the house was built between 1865 and 1867 by Levi Louis "L. L." Pratt (1818 - 1905) and his wife Sarah "Selina" Buckingham (1825 - 1907). Pratt, a native of Northampton, Massachusetts was a journalist and a brother of celebrated architect William Fenno Pratt (1814 - 1900), designer of the Evergreens in Amherst, Massachusetts. The layout of the Pratt and Buckingham octagon follows much of Amherst College graduate Orson Squire Fowler's recommendations in a drawing which he credited to others and labeled as the "best plan yet."

In her 1966 book featuring this home, State University of New York at Fredonia professor Jewel Helen Conover noted that the grout walls are 24 inches thick. In his 1997 book containing references to this home, State University of New York at Fredonia professor Daniel D. Reiff further noted that the walls are composed of lime grout containing an aggregate of small stones, brick chips, and twigs. An octagonal carriage house of similar construction was noted by both Conover and Reiff; it remains on the premises. The house and the carriage house each feature a low-pitched, hip roof, which is topped by an octagonal cupola. As noted by Reiff, the wide, bracketed eaves of the house recall Italianate style, while the caps at each window of the house, and the pilaster strips along each corner, give hints of Greek Revival style.

As explained by State University of New York at Fredonia archives volunteer Kathryn S. Silliman in her 1993 article, the home features pointed, decorative window caps, and the windows themselves are recessed, allowing for flower boxes on the ledges. The front entrance is crowned by a curved cap with brackets, to match the ornate cornice brackets. Although Fowler had advised that the first floor be raised enough so that the house could be entered through the basement, the Pratt and Buckingham octagon is not raised. However, as Silliman noted, the home is situated on a slope, allowing the basement to be entered by a few steps downward at the rear of the home. A kitchen was originally located at that sub-level, just as advocated by Fowler.

Pratt was the editor of a Fredonia newspaper, and Buckingham was the daughter of well known Fredonians. In terms of the home's architectural significance, an examination of the floor plans and their relatively minor alterations over the years indicates that the style and layout of the house remain essentially as Fowler, Pratt, and Buckingham originally intended. Regarding the home's historical significance, folklore concerning an Underground Railroad connection with the house proves false. However, census records, deed records, tax records, and newspaper sources indicate that Pratt and Buckingham had at least an indirect connection with the significantly large anti-slavery movement in the Fredonia region.

In 1958, during the home's careful stewardship by Fredonia lawyer Donald C. Brandt and local teacher Kathryn Ogden and their family, the house was included in The Octagon Fad. Conover's and Reiff's research began during the Brandt and Ogden ownership as well. Silliman's article appeared when the home was owned and under restoration by Fredonia architect William McGraw and his family. As Silliman noted, McGraw pointed out several more of the original, architectural features, which he and his family preserved. Considering the structural research by Conover, Reiff, Silliman, and McGraw, along with further historical discoveries in local records, has helped to paint a clearer picture of the house in relationship to its earliest occupants.

== Floor plans ==
The eight sides of the home each have an exterior dimension of 17 feet 2 inches. Of two exterior doorways that existed in the sub-level kitchen, one remains and is in use. The other is closed but visible. The former kitchen is now a furnace room and utility room. Also at the sub-level, two original, parallel, bearing walls of grout construction run the width of the structure, supporting the first and second floors as well as the cupola. A large work area between those two walls is now a recreation room. Two rooms that served as living quarters for hired hands are found on either side of the two bearing walls. They now function as an artist's studio and as a workshop, respectively.

Originally and today, on both the first and second floors, four rectangular rooms and four triangular rooms (or areas) alternately flank a central stairway and an L-shaped central hallway. The rectangular rooms on the first floor were most likely a dining room, a parlor, a library, and a kitchen, as they each remain today.

Also on the first floor, one of the triangular rooms retains its original use as the front entryway. It features a circular stairway to the second floor. The opposite triangular room was once the rear entryway, perhaps featuring another circular stairway and/or a dumb waiter to and from the basement kitchen. The other two triangular areas are now bisected by walls, such that approximately half of each of those triangular areas became parts of their respectively adjoining rectangular rooms. This most likely occurred in the 1920s, at which time, the window in one of those triangular rooms was closed and sealed.

In subsequent years, the triangular area that originally featured the rear entryway has contained a large closet and a full bath. The original, back entrance to the first floor of the home has been closed; instead, a rear entrance doorway to the first floor now stands in the location where an original window once stood in the adjoining kitchen.

The rectangular rooms on the second floor were probably a master bedroom, a boys' bedroom, a girls' bedroom, and a servant's or guest's bedroom. Their use today is essentially the same, with the exceptions that a few closets have been added, and that one of the children's bedrooms now contains a full bath. The open, triangular area above the front entryway features an original, wrap-around balcony. The opposite triangular room, which is now a full-bath, is located over the former, rear entryway. Therefore, the room may have once contained the upper terminus of the other spiral stairway.

As on the first floor, the other two triangular rooms have been split by partitioning walls, allowing the extra triangular spaces from each to be added to each of the adjoining bedrooms. Likewise, the window in one of those triangular rooms has been closed. Although architectural plans from the 1960s appear to have called for the re-opening of that window, it remains sealed both inside and out.

The central stairway is accessed from the L-shaped central hallway, which leads from an interior doorway in the kitchen. The hallway also provides entrance to the dining room and to the parlor. The central stairway featured a 3-step spiral at its base as late as the mid-1950s. That space now contains two landings instead. From the first landing, two steps downward through a former door once provided an additional entrance to the library. Beneath the first-floor stairway is a straight flight of stairs leading to the basement. On the second floor, at the top of the central stairway, there is an original stairway with one landing and one turn, leading to a trap door in the cupola. The central stairway, the circular stairway, and the cupola stairway all feature original, low handrails with three/quarter balusters.

== Other alterations ==
Although a double-door entry from the parlor/living room to the dining room still exists, the matching double-door entry from the parlor/living room to the library has been closed, so that the library is now accessed only from the original front entryway. Four chimneys each had three fireplaces, which were situated one above the other on the ground floor, first floor, and second floor. Most of those have been closed and sealed, but three remain in working order and in use (one in the basement and two on the first floor). At least one of the chimneys has been replaced and upgraded. The sub-level kitchen was most likely decommissioned in the 1920s or earlier. Upgrades to the first floor kitchen took place in the 1920s, the 1960s, and the 1980s, respectively.

Other changes to the home since its original construction have been the addition of lighting, plumbing, central heating, and security systems. The cucumber wood floors have been protected by suitable coverings, but the home features original, natural woodwork and period decor. An enclosed porch replaced the original rear steps during the early twentieth century, and the original brick and slate steps at the front entryway were replaced in the late twentieth century. In the 1920s, a two-car garage with a rear loft was constructed next to the carriage house. The loft and a shop beneath it served as work space for those who managed the Concord grape vineyards on the property.

== History ==
Pratt's father was an architect and a member of the Massachusetts state legislature. Levi Louis "L.L." Pratt began his journalism career as an apprentice at the Northampton Courier, where he met his lifelong friends Beman Brockway (1815 - 1892) and Willard McKinstry (1815 - 1899). Each of the three was a staunch Whig. Brockway and Pratt soon operated a newspaper in the Chautauqua County village of Mayville, New York, while McKinstry operated another in nearby Erie, Pennsylvania. Members of Brockway's family settled in southern Chautauqua County, and his sister Nancy married Benjamin Greely (Greeley), first cousin of Horace Greeley, whose family members had also settled in southern Chautauqua County and nearby Erie County, Pennsylvania.

Pratt and McKinstry eventually took over The Fredonia Censor newspaper, and Pratt was named Fredonia's Post Master by President Zachary Taylor. However, because Pratt was reassigned the Post Master position by President Millard Fillmore, and because many Whigs considered Fillmore a traitor to the abolitionist cause, Pratt became the editor of a new paper called The Fredonia Advertiser. In that position, he supported Fillmore, evidently forgiving him for the compromise that many felt had at least temporarily saved the Union. Pratt and McKinstry remained friendly rivals, and Pratt became a Village Trustee. In that capacity, he helped to lobby Albany for a state normal school to be established in Fredonia, the predecessor of today's State University of New York at Fredonia.

Deed records show Pratt's purchase of the land for the octagon in 1855, with financial assistance from his wife's family. Pratt's in-laws were the former drover and real estate developer Alanson Buckingham (1797 - 1881) and his wife Sarah Akin (1801 - 1887). Although the home has been rumored over the years to have been part of the Underground Railroad, the house was not completed in time for that enterprise. Yet, the Buckinghams and the Pratts were at least distantly connected to the anti-slavery movement. The Buckinghams, for example, were once associated with a private school that was attended by Hanson Risley, an abolitionist whose daughter Olive Risley Seward was adopted as a late-life companion by William H. Seward.

Shortly before Pratt became the editor of the Advertiser, the newspaper published a statement of outrage at the recapture of an Underground Railroad refugee in Chautauqua County. McKinstry had expressed even stronger editorial outrage over the recapture. However, since Pratt's newspaper was not as openly abolitionist in its editorial stance as was McKinstry's, the main reason for the Underground Railroad rumors about the octagon may be the fact that the house was built on a documented route for refugees who had been escorted by Eber M. Pettit to his parents' Underground Railroad station one mile north of the Pratt lands.

According to the 1850 census, Pratt was living in the McKinstry household on West Main Street in Fredonia, but for the 1855 census, he was listed in the West Main Street household of his in-laws, which was also on Pettit's route. With Pratt were his new bride Selina and their young son John (1854 - 1872). In 1860, Pratt was still with his wife and son in the Buckingham household, along with two young daughters, Sarah (1855 - 1886) and Harriet (born 1859). In 1865, Pratt and his family were living in a small house while the octagon was under construction.

For the next few years, Pratt took out several mortgages with wealthy Fredonians. He also sold his newspaper and began selling insurance. Tax records indicate that the house was complete by 1867 and valued at $9000 in currency of the period. According to census records, the Pratt family seems to have lived in the octagon from that time until at least 1871, when Pratt left town alone, having been recruited by his old friend Brockway for a newspaper position with the Watertown Daily Times in Watertown, NY, where Pratt would remain a highly respected citizen for the rest of his life. Pratt may have intended to return to Fredonia after earning enough money in Watertown to pay his mortgage debt. Or, his family may have intended to join him in Watertown.

However, with young son John's sudden death from spinal meningitis the following year, all plans must have changed. Fredonia's cemetery records show that young John was buried at Forest Hill Cemetery in the village. Yet, census records show that Selina and her daughters spent the rest of their lives with other Buckingham family members in Ohio. Upon her death in 1907, Selina was buried back in Fredonia, as had been daughter Sarah upon her death in 1886. Daughter Harriet may have been buried there as well, but that is not confirmed at this writing. Pratt and his wife had never divorced, but cemetery records indicate that following his 1905 funeral in Watertown NY, Pratt was buried in his hometown of Northampton MA.

After the death of young John, the octagon was foreclosed upon and then conveyed by a sheriff's deed to the Fredonia lawyer Isaac A. Saxton, Jr. (1822 - 1884), and his wife Louisa Pier (1824 - 1907), who was a graduate of Mount Holyoke and a preceptor of the Fredonia Academy. Saxton had been one of the Fredonians who loaned money to Pratt for the octagon's construction. Saxton also owned several other properties in Fredonia, including his parents' home and 100-acre farm near the Pettit home. The Saxtons, Pettits, and Piers were longtime, active members of the Fredonia Baptist Church, an anti-slavery congregation.

Before moving to the octagon, the Saxtons had lost two children, Louisa Evelyn (1858 - 1865) and Isaac Clarence (1860 - 1863). A third child, Isaac "Henry" Saxton (1864 - 1933), grew up in the octagon, and a fourth child Evaline "Eva" Saxton was born there in 1876. Although Henry became a successful real estate developer in Chicago, census and deed records indicate that he kept the octagon until 1917, renting it to various families as caretakers of the home and managers of the surrounding farm. The Saxtons and three of their children were buried in Fredonia's Forest Hill Cemetery. According to deed records for the past hundred years, the octagon has been owned by only four other families, three of those families having lived there for at least a quarter-century each.
