= Greta Morine-Dershimer =

American education researcher

Greta Morine-Dershimer is an American education researcher. She is Professor Emerita in the University of Virginia’s School of Education and Human Development. She has served as an officer of the American Educational Research Association, and is a former editor of Teaching and Teacher Education.

== Education ==
Born Greta Mae Gailewicz in Fredonia, New York, Morine-Dershimer is a 1953 graduate of Fredonia Teachers College, now State University of New York at Fredonia. She taught in elementary and junior high schools in diverse settings for ten years. In 1965 she earned her doctorate in education from Teachers College, Columbia University.

== Career ==
Before her appointment to the University of Virginia in 1989, Morine-Dershimer's career as an education professional, researcher, and theorist, and as an educator of teachers, included appointments at Hofstra University, the Far West Laboratory for Educational Research and Development in San Francisco, and Syracuse University. At the University of Virginia she was Director of Teacher Education and Senior Researcher in the Commonwealth Center for the Education of Teachers.

In her research, Morine-Dershimer has specialized in teacher education and in teachers' and pupils' thinking and learning strategies in dynamic classroom settings. She has particularly investigated classroom discourse and "how different instructional processes led to different responses from students." She was a pioneer of in-depth study of visual and verbal material from videotaped recordings of actual classrooms, with associated interviews of teachers and pupils. She maintained that sound education research is founded securely upon evidence and cautioned that "policy-makers and teachers need to know the status of research on programs that are popularized without supportive evidence." Morine-Dershimer has argued that because "the teacher's selection of instructional strategy can play a role in determining who participates and who is heard in class discussions," the teacher can, in selecting a strategy, "in effect 'create' new groups of pupils" who are better included.

== Works ==
Morine-Dershimer is the author of six books, more than 20 book chapters, and numerous journal articles. Her books include A Primer for the Inner-City School (coauthored with Harold Morine, 1970), Discovery: A Challenge to Teachers (with Harold Morine, 1973), Creating the School: An Introduction to Education (with Bruce R. Joyce, 1976), Teacher Plan and Classroom Reality (1979), and Talking, Listening, and Learning in Elementary Classrooms (1985). Her articles include “Classroom Management and Classroom Discourse” in Handbook of Classroom Management, edited by Carolyn M. Evertson and Carol S. Weinstein (2006). Morine-Dershimer is a community advocate in Charlottesville, Virginia.
