= Goldhaber =

Goldhaber is a German surname meaning "gold oats"; or "possessor of gold". Notable people with the surname include:

- Gerson Goldhaber (1924–2010), German-born American physicist, brother of Maurice Goldhaber
- Gertrude Scharff Goldhaber (1911–1998), German-American physicist, wife of Maurice Goldhaber
- Marcus Goldhaber (born 1978), American jazz vocalist and band leader
- Maurice Goldhaber (1911–2011), Austro-Hungarian-born American physicist
- Nat Goldhaber, American venture capitalist, computer entrepreneur and politician
- Sulamith Goldhaber (1923–1965), Austrian-born American physicist, wife of Gerson Goldhaber
