= WNYF =

WNYF refers to multiple television stations in New York State:

- WNYF-TV (SUNY Fredonia), Fredonia, New York—a student television station at the State University of New York
- WNYF-CD, a low-power television station (channel 35/PSIP 28) licensed to serve Watertown, New York, USA
- WWNY-CD, a low-power television station (channel 18/PSIP 28) licensed to serve Massena, New York, USA, formerly known as WNYF-CD, WNYF-LD, and WNYF-LP; repeater for WNYF-CD
