= Fredonia Gas Light Company =

The Fredonia Gas Light Company, founded in 1858, was the first natural gas company in the United States. It was founded by a group of entrepreneurs after William Hart, considered the "father of natural gas" in the U.S., drilled in 1821 the first natural gas well in America along Canadaway Creek in Fredonia, New York. The well was approximately 27 feet (8.2 m) deep; by contrast, modern wells are over 7,500 feet (2,300 m) deep. The well was actually a big hole dug with shovels. The pipeline to transport the gas was made from hollowed out logs connected together with tar and rags.
