= WCVF-FM =

WCVF-FM (Fredonia Radio Systems)
- Fredonia, New York; United States
- Broadcast area: Fredonia, New York Dunkirk, New York
- Frequency: 88.9 MHz
- Branding: The Voice

Programming
- Format: Variety
- Affiliations: NPR

Ownership
- Owner: State University of New York; (SUNY Fredonia)
- Sister stations: WDVL 89.5 The Inferno

History
- Founded: 1948
- First air date: 1978
- Former call signs: WCVF-AM
- Call sign meaning: "Community Voice of Fredonia"

Technical information
- Licensing authority: FCC
- Facility ID: 4302
- Class: A
- ERP: 130 watts
- HAAT: −35.0 meters (−114.8 ft)
- Transmitter coordinates: 42°27′08″N 79°20′14″W

Links
- Public license information: (Fredonia Radio Systems) Public file; LMS
- Webcast: Listen Live
- Website: fredoniaradio.com

WCVF-FM (88.9 MHz) is a college radio station in Fredonia, New York. The station is licensed to the State University of New York at Fredonia. "CVF" stands for "Campus and Community Voice of Fredonia," the station's slogan. The station primarily features Alternative and Indie rock, but includes an eclectic mix of genres. Listeners can catch a mix of Classic Rock, Blues, Jazz, Folk, Hip Hop, and decade-specific hours, like 70s, 80s, 90s, and 2000s music. Live programs hosted by student and community jocks can be of any format or genre, from talk, music, and radio drama.

WCVF-FM also covers local and international news, written and read by students of the university. The station's music director reports to the North American College & Community Radio Chart for charting and, along with production and program directors, devotes time slots for new music sent to the station. The radio station gives a voice to local and campus musicians, playing their music on the air. Local artists in the Western New York area submit their music to the station to be played on local music segments and during standard broadcasting hours.

WCVF-FM is entirely student-run. WCVF-FM is a part of Fredonia Radio Systems, an extracurricular club giving students of the college an opportunity to work in all aspects of a radio station.

WCVF broadcasts NPR Monday through Friday: Morning Edition and All Things Considered through a partnership with NPR member station WQLN-FM in Erie, Pennsylvania.

WCVF-FM's sister station, WDVL 89.5 "The Inferno", airs a Top 40 format via streaming on the internet. WDVL was originally founded as an AM station in 1948, making it the oldest radio station in the SUNY college system.

== History ==
WCVF-FM, coupled with its sister station, WDVL, is the oldest radio station in the SUNY college system. Founded in 1948, the radio station began as a production of the English and Drama Department, providing radio programming to students in the dorms via low-powered AM transmitters in the dorm basements, at 600 kHz. Students had been producing shows for WDOE-AM in Dunkirk, New York, before WCVF-AM was established on the SUNY Fredonia campus. In 1966, the early AM station split from academic supervision to be fully operated and funded by the Student Government Association. As the college constructed additional dormitories, WCVF-FM added more transmitters, connecting them to the dorm power wiring in what was known as a "carrier-current" transmission. This expansion included the installation of a transmitter to serve off-campus student housing near Brigham Road in Fredonia. WCVF 88.9 FM was created and had its first broadcast in 1978 under the supervision of Dan Berggren, a professor in the Department of Communications/Media. In 1969, WCVF-FM relocated from its initial home in Fenton Hall to a suite of rooms in the basement of Jewett Hall, an air-conditioned space originally designed as TV studios. For a short time, the station moved and operated from a small press box in Dods Hall. In the summer of 1972, the station moved once again into new student-constructed offices and studios in Gregory Hall. In the late 70s, the station moved one last time to the first floor of McEwen Hall, where it currently resides. It houses four production booths, a handful of offices, and a recording booth nicknamed "Graham Command."

In 2017, WCVF-FM won the award for Best College Radio Station (Under 10,000 students) at the annual Intercollegiate Broadcasting System (IBS) award ceremony in New York City. The station won the same award again in 2018. In 2026, WDVL won Best College Streaming-Only Station (Under 10,000 Students), making this the first win of this kind for WDVL since its creation.

== Notable Radio Shows ==
=== High Noon Friday ===
Started in 1984, High Noon Friday was created to satisfy the need for public service programming. Named after the 1952 movie High Noon, it became the station's first "all-station program", creating an opportunity for every member of every department to contribute. The show is simulcast on both WCVF-FM and WDVL every Friday.

High Noon Friday features local and international news, sports, weather, community-made segments, interviews, and trivia, and is Fredonia Radio System's single longest-running variety program. High Noon Friday is broadcast live every Friday at 12:00 pm. The station celebrated the show turning forty years old in 2024 with an 80s-themed ice-skating event.

Former logo

=== The Local Lo-Down ===
The Local Lo-Down is a prominent local music show that airs on WCVF. Started in 2012, The Local Lo-Down was created to showcase local musical talent around Fredonia, NY, as well as highlight touring artists that come through the area. The show is known for interviewing local bands and broadcasting on-air performances. Throughout the station's history, The Local Lo-Down has been one of the only shows to feature a visual element. Its episodes can be found on the station's YouTube page.

=== Lovercall ===
Lovercall is Fredonia Radio System's late-night, anonymous, dating advice show, exclusive to WCVF-FM's sister station WDVL. Produced by students, for students, the show focuses on answering the student population's questions about love, relationships, and more. Lovercall also works in conjunction with SUNY Fredonia's student-run newspaper, The Leader, writing advice columns and date ideas. In 2024, the show won an award for the Most Creative/Innovative Show at the Intercollegiate Broadcasting System (IBS) ceremony.

== See also ==
- List of radio stations in New York
- State University of New York at Fredonia
