= United States Post Office–Fredonia =

US Post Office-Fredonia may refer to:

- United States Post Office (Fredonia, Kansas), listed on the NRHP in Kansas
- United States Post Office (Fredonia, New York), List of RHPs in NY
