= Gaelen Foley =

American author

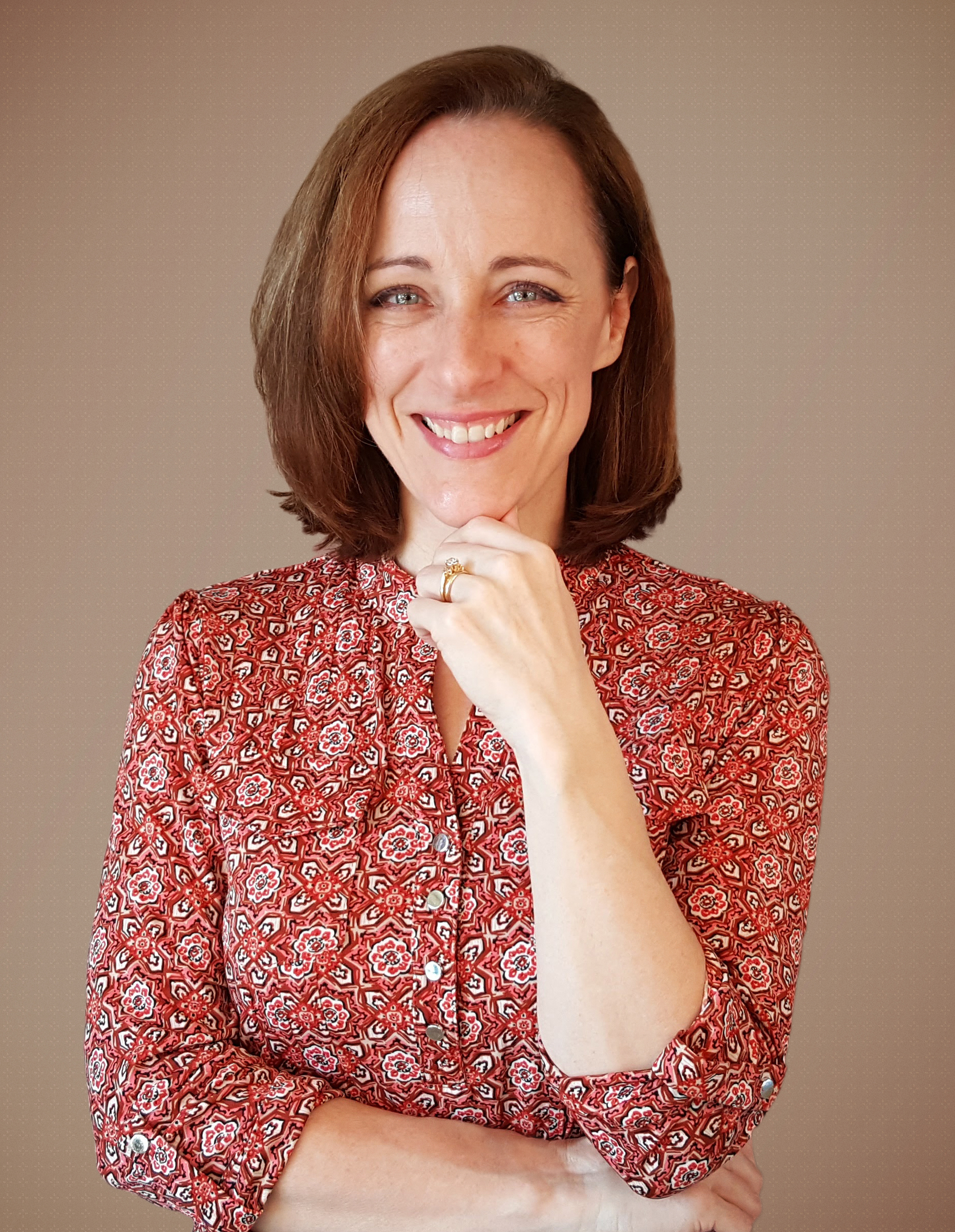
- NYT Bestselling Author Gaelen Foley
- Born: November 16, 1969 (age 56); Pittsburgh, Pennsylvania, U.S.
- Education: State University of New York at Fredonia (BA)
- Occupation: Novelist
- Spouse: Eric Foley
- Writing career
- Pen name: E.G. Foley
- Years active: 1998–present
- Genres: Romance; Middle Grade / YA
- Notable works: The Ascension Trilogy; The Knight Family; The Inferno Club; Moonlight Square; The Gryphon Chronicles
- Website: gaelenfoley.com

Gaelen Foley (born November 6, 1973) is an American author best known for writing romance novels set in the Regency era. She has also been self-publishing middle grade fantasy books under the pen name E.G. Foley since 2012. Her books have been in the USA Today bestseller list regularly since 2000 and the New York Times bestseller list since 2008. Gaelen's novels have been translated into 20+ foreign languages and have sold millions of copies worldwide.

== Biography ==
Gaelen Foley is the eldest of four sisters. She holds a B.A. in English literature with a minor in philosophy from the State University of New York at Fredonia. After college, Foley wrote as much as she could in her free time while working a variety of odd jobs, including: waitressing, library assistant, and medical office staff. In that time, she wrote four full-length manuscripts, honing her craft, before the fifth was picked up by one of the Big Five (publishers), Random House. In 1998 her first romance novel, The Pirate Prince, was published and since then she has penned some 35+ novels.

== Awards and reception ==
- 2009 - Romantic Times Reviewers' Choice Award finalist, Historical Romantic Adventure – My Wicked Marquess
- National Readers' Choice
- Booksellers' Best
- Golden Leaf
- Award of Excellence
- Laurie
- Romantic Times Reviewers' Choice Award for Best First Historical
- The Holt Medallion

== Bibliography ==
=== Writing as Gaelen Foley ===
==== Ascension Trilogy ====
1. The Pirate Prince (1998)
2. Princess (1999)
3. Prince Charming (2000)

==== Knight Miscellany ====
1. The Duke (2000)
2. Lord of Fire (2002)
3. Lord of Ice (2002)
4. Lady of Desire (2003)
5. Devil Takes a Bride (2004)
6. One Night of Sin (2005)
7. His Wicked Kiss (2006)

==== Spice Trilogy ====
1. Her Only Desire (2007)
2. Her Secret Fantasy (2007)
3. Her Every Pleasure (2008)

==== Inferno Club ====
1. My Wicked Marquess (2009)
2. My Dangerous Duke (2010)
3. My Irresistible Earl (2011)
4. My Ruthless Prince (2012)
5. My Scandalous Viscount (2012)
6. My Notorious Gentleman (2013)
7. The Secrets of a Scoundrel (2014)

==== Age of Heroes ====
1. Paladin's Prize (2015)

==== Harmony Falls ====
1. Dream of Me (2016)
2. Belong to Me (2017)

==== Moonlight Square ====
1. One Moonlit Night (2015)
2. Duke of Scandal (2015)
3. Duke of Secrets (2017)
4. Duke of Storm (2017)
5. Duke of Shadows (2018)

=== Writing as E.G. Foley ===
==== The Gryphon Chronicles ====
1. The Lost Heir (2012)
2. Jake & The Giant (2013)
3. The Dark Portal (2013)
4. The Gingerbread Wars (2013)
5. Rise of Allies (2014)
6. Secrets of the Deep (2016)
7. The Black Fortress (2019)
8. The Dragon Lord (2020)
9. The Sorcerer's Army (2022)
10. The Devil's Lair (2023)

==== 50 States of Fear ====
1. The Haunted Plantation (2014)
2. Bringing Home Bigfoot (2014)
3. Leader of the Pack (2014)
4. The Dork & The Deathray (2015)
