= Dunkirk (town), New York =

Town of Dunkirk, New York
- Town
- Location within Chautauqua County and New York state

- Location within New York Location within the United States
- Coordinates: 42°27′51″N 79°20′33″W
- Country: United States
- State: New York
- County: Chautauqua

Government
  - Type: Town Council
  - Town Supervisor: Richard A. Purol (D)
  - Town Council: Members' List: • Dr. G. Jay Bishop (R); • Robert L. Penharlow (R); • Henry G. Walldorff (R); • Juan Pagan (D)

Area
  - Total: 6.28 sq mi (16.27 km^{2})
  - Land: 6.23 sq mi (16.13 km^{2})
  - Water: 0.054 sq mi (0.14 km^{2})
- Elevation: 673 ft (205 m)

Population (2020)
  - Total: 1,257
  - Estimate (2021): 1,248
  - Density: 170.4/sq mi (65.78/km^{2})
- Time zone: UTC-5 (Eastern (EST))
  - Summer (DST): UTC-4 (EDT)
- ZIP Codes: 14048 (Dunkirk); 14063 (Fredonia)
- Area code: 716
- FIPS code: 36-21116
- GNIS feature ID: 0978912
- Website: www.townofdunkirkny.gov

Dunkirk is a town in Chautauqua County, New York, United States. The population was 1,257 at the 2020 census.

The town of Dunkirk is split into two sections, east and west, by the city of Dunkirk, which is a separate entity.

== History ==
The area was first settled circa 1808. Development was slow until the New York and Erie Railroad established a station in Dunkirk village in 1851. The town of Dunkirk was established in 1859 from the northern portion of the town of Pomfret. The village of Dunkirk was incorporated in 1837, becoming a city in 1888.

The first naval skirmish in the War of 1812 began in Lake Erie near the mouth of Canadaway Creek, which is now within the boundaries of the western part of the town. A small marker commemorating the event sits near the intersection of Route 5 and Temple Street.

== Geography ==
According to the United States Census Bureau, the town has a total area of 6.3 square miles (16.3 km^{2}), of which 6.2 square miles (16.1 km^{2}) is land and 0.04 square miles (0.1 km^{2}), or 0.85%, is water.

The New York State Thruway (Interstate 90) and NY Route 5 pass through the town. The town of Dunkirk is served by the Buffalo-Chicago main lines of both CSX Transportation and the Norfolk Southern Railway.

The town of Dunkirk is split into an east section and a west section by the city of Dunkirk, which is located in the middle.

=== Adjacent towns and areas ===
(Clockwise)

- Lake Erie
- Sheridan
- Pomfret; Fredonia
- Lake Erie

== Demographics ==
Historical population
Census	Pop.	Note	%±
1860	5,616		—
1900	454		—
1910	429		−5.5%
1920	512		19.3%
1930	726		41.8%
1940	672		−7.4%
1950	887		32.0%
1960	1,541		73.7%
1970	1,646		6.8%
1980	1,584		−3.8%
1990	1,482		−6.4%
2000	1,387		−6.4%
2010	1,318		−5.0%
2020	1,257		−4.6%
2021 (est.)	1,248		−0.7%
U.S. Decennial Census

As of the census of 2000, there were 1,387 people, 519 households, and 333 families residing in the town. The population density was 222.1 inhabitants per square mile (85.8/km^{2}). There were 602 housing units at an average density of 96.4 per square mile (37.2/km^{2}). The racial makeup of the town was 94.16% White, 2.24% Black or African American, 0.58% Native American, 0.07% Asian, 1.66% from other races, and 1.30% from two or more races. Hispanic or Latino of any race were 4.33% of the population.

There were 519 households, out of which 22.5% had children under the age of 18 living with them, 49.1% were married couples living together, 10.4% had a female householder with no husband present, and 35.8% were non-families. 30.3% of all households were made up of individuals, and 13.5% had someone living alone who was 65 years of age or older. The average household size was 2.27 and the average family size was 2.78.

In the town, the population was spread out, with 15.6% under the age of 18, 5.8% from 18 to 24, 20.3% from 25 to 44, 27.2% from 45 to 64, and 31.1% who were 65 years of age or older. The median age was 50 years. For every 100 females, there were 85.9 males. For every 100 females age 18 and over, there were 81.4 males.

The median income for a household in the town was $33,553, and the median income for a family was $40,000. Males had a median income of $32,692 versus $23,194 for females. The per capita income for the town was $19,124. About 7.1% of families and 11.7% of the population were below the poverty line, including 19.5% of those under age 18 and 3.8% of those age 65 or over.

== Communities and locations in Dunkirk ==
- Canadaway Creek – The War of 1812 began near the mouth of Canadaway Creek.
