= Student television station =

A student television station is a television station run by university, high or middle school students that primarily airs school/university news and in many cases, student-produced soap operas, entertainment shows, and other programming.

At the high school level and below, working for a school's television station is often an extracurricular activity but often included in a journalism class taught at the school, in which students learn about the journalistic profession and produce school news reports. Student television stations at this level almost always broadcast through the school's closed circuit television system. Working for a middle or high school student television station can often be an alternative to students interested in journalism, who choose not to work at a school newspaper. Studio and production space is often provided by a community or local public-access television stations.

At the university level, student television stations can either take the form of a student organization or be a broadcast journalism laboratory. Often, the station produces more original programming than would be seen at the high school level. A student television station at a university may either be supported in full or part by the university, or self-sufficient, receiving its operating budget from advertising broadcast on the channel.

== See also ==
- British Student Television
- Cable access
- Journalism
- Texas Student Television
- College radio
- WNYF-TV
- RMITV
