= Rich Ceisler =

Rich Ceisler (March 1, 1956 – August 4, 2014) was an American stand-up comedian, author, and director.

== Early life and education ==
Ceisler attended State University of New York Fredonia, studying Theater Arts. He later pursued graduate studies at Virginia Tech, where he obtained a master's degree in theater.

== Death ==
In August 2014, Ceisler died in Santiago, Dominican Republic at the age of 58 from Guillain–Barré syndrome. He had contracted a rare illness two weeks before he died.
