= Tom Pokel =

American ice hockey player and coach

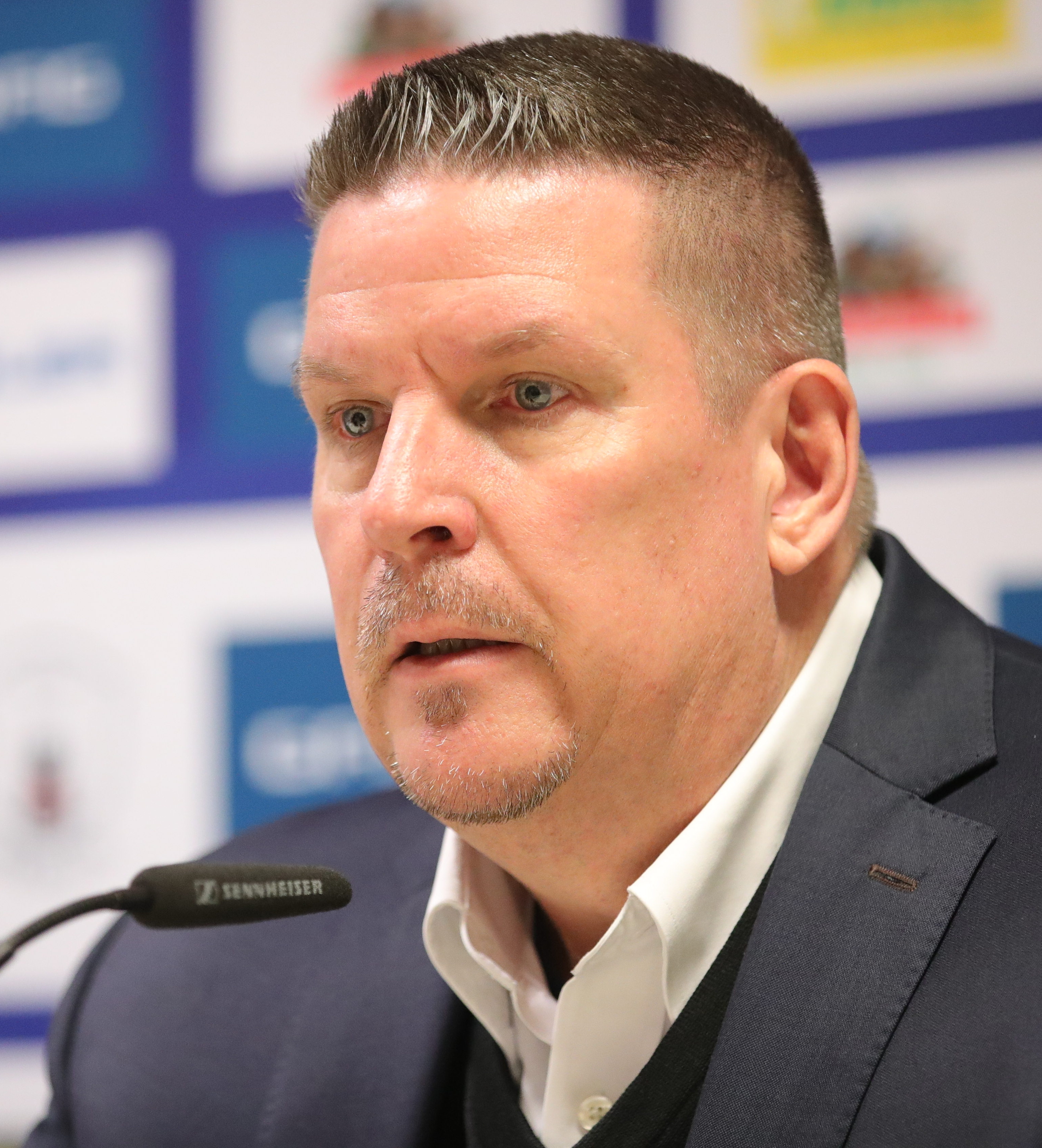
- Tom Pokel in 2022
- Born: September 2, 1967 (age 58) Green Bay, Wisconsin, U.S.
- Height: 5 ft 10 in (178 cm)
- Weight: 185 lb (84 kg; 13 st 3 lb)
- Position: Defense
- Shot: Right
- Played for: SUNY-Fredonia (ECAC-W)
- NHL draft: Undrafted
- Playing career: 1985–1991

Tom Pokel (born September 2, 1967) is an American professional ice hockey coach and a former ice hockey defenseman. He is currently the head coach for the Straubing Tigers of the Deutsche Eishockey Liga (DEL).

== Playing career ==
Pokel attended the State University of New York at Fredonia and was a three-time captain for the men's ice hockey team. He graduated in 1991.

== Coaching career ==
Pokel worked on the Buffalo Sabres' marketing department for six years following his playing career, and in 1995 accepted the head coach position at German second-division side EHC Timmendorfer Strand. After two years in that job, he took over ESC Trier and one year later was named head coach of the Bietigheim Steelers who he guided to promotion from the third to second division in 1999.

In 2001, he moved from Bietigheim to Schwenninger ERC of the German top-flight Deutsche Eishockey Liga (DEL), joining the Wild Wings as an assistant coach. On April 30, 2002, he was promoted to head coach. Pokel and the Wild Wings parted ways in October 2002.

Following a short stint as assistant coach at ERC Ingolstadt, he left Germany for Austria, serving as head coach of VEU Feldkirch, guiding the team to winning the championship in Austria's second division Nationalliga, EHC Lustenau, Graz 99ers and EK Zell am See.

In 2009, Pokel was appointed as head coach of Italian Serie A club SG Pontebba. He would guide the team to three playoff appearances in his three years at the helm.

He signed with fellow Serie A side Kanguro Alleghe Hockey for the 2012-13 campaign.

Pokel then led HC Bolzano to the EBEL Championship in their inaugural season of the Austrian Hockey League in the 2013–14 season. Pokel joined the Vienna Capitals of the Austrian Hockey League (EBEL) on May 26, 2014. He parted company with the Capitals in February 2015. Pokel returned to Bolzano for the 2015-16 campaign and stayed on the job until the conclusion of the 2016–17 season. On October 26, 2017, he was named head coach of the Straubing Tigers of the German DEL.

== International ==
On the back of his successful season with Bolzano, Pokel was named the head coach of the Italy national ice hockey team for competition at the 2014 IIHF World Championship.
