= Fredonia Commons Historic District =

Historic district in New York, United States

- U.S. National Register of Historic Places
- U.S. Historic district
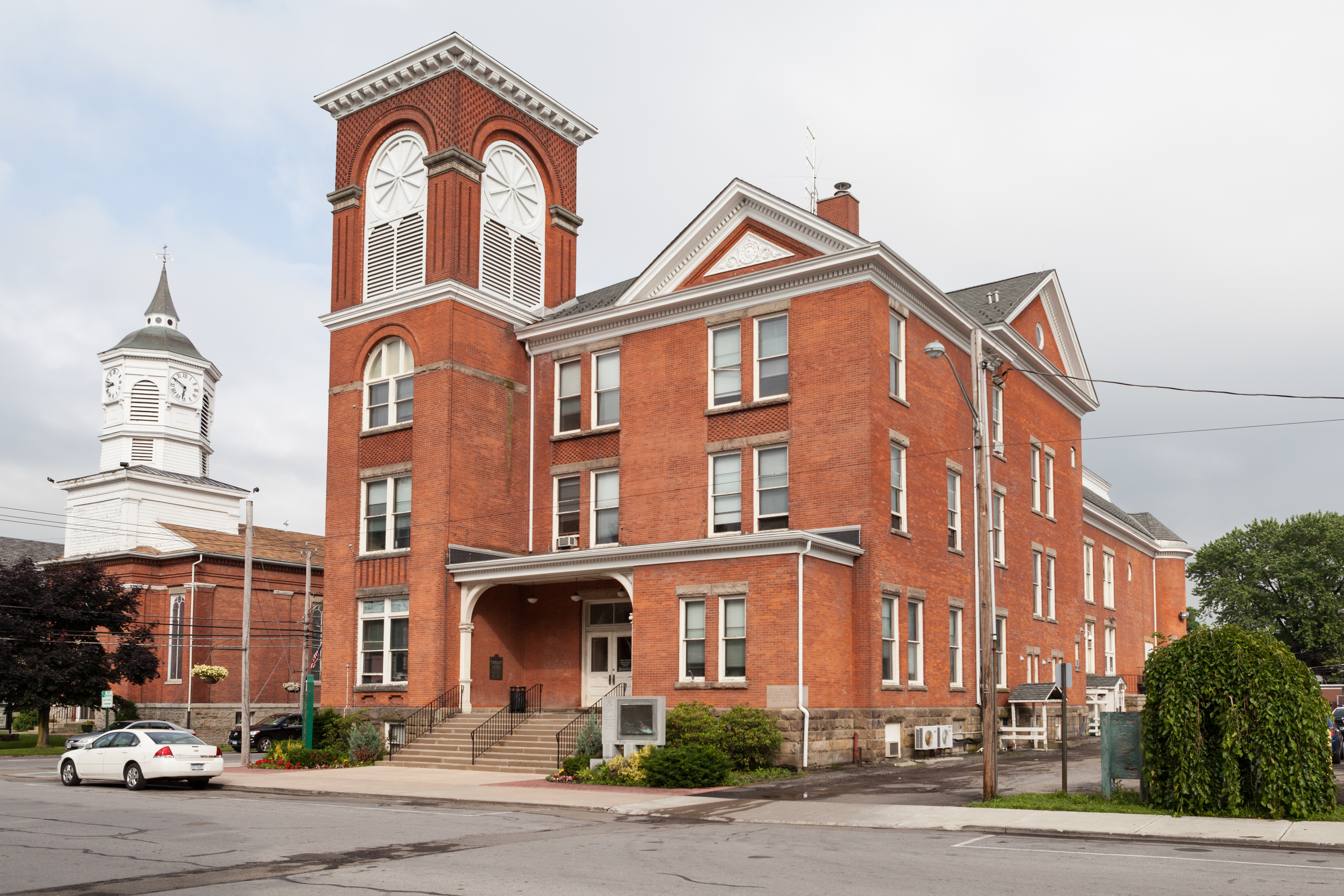
- Fredonia Village Hall in July, 2015

- Location within New York Location within the United States
- Location: Main, Temple, Church, Day, and Center Sts., Fredonia, New York
- Coordinates: 42°26′25″N 79°19′55″W
- Built: 1834
- Architect: Jones, John; Et al.
- Architectural style: Mid 19th Century Revival, Early Republic, Late Victorian
- NRHP reference No.: 78001843
- Added to NRHP: October 19, 1978

Fredonia Commons Historic District is a national historic district located at Fredonia in Chautauqua County, New York. The district encompasses the central core of Fredonia; the main civic buildings, churches and commercial structures clustered around the commons. The district includes approximately 25 structures including the Fenner Fire Station, Village Hall, U.S. Post Office, Darwin R. Baker Library, United Methodist Church, Baptist Church, and Trinity Episcopal Church. Commercial buildings are located along the south side of the commons.

It was listed on the National Register of Historic Places in 1978.
