= State University of New York at Fredonia =

Public university in Fredonia, New York, US

- Former names: Fredonia Academy (1826–1867); Fredonia Normal School (1867–1942); Fredonia State Teachers College (1942–1948); State University of New York College at Fredonia (1948–2023)
- Motto: Where Success is a Tradition
- Type: Public university
- Established: 1826; 200 years ago
- Parent institution: State University of New York
- Endowment: $58.5 million (2025)
- President: Stephen H. Kolison Jr.
- Students: 3,174 (fall 2025)
- Undergraduates: 2,791 (fall 2025)
- Postgraduates: 483 (fall 2025)
- Location: Fredonia, New York, U.S. 42.45344°N 79.33697°W
- Campus: 256 acres (104 ha); Small town
- Colors: Blue and white
- Nickname: Blue Devils
- Sporting affiliations: NCAA Division III, SUNYAC; 16 varsity teams
- Mascot: Freddy
- Website: fredonia.edu

The State University of New York at Fredonia (alternatively SUNY Fredonia, Fredonia State, or Fredonia) is a public university in Fredonia, New York, United States. It is the westernmost member of the State University of New York. Founded in 1826, it is the seventh-oldest college in New York, and second-oldest public school in New York (SUNY and CUNY) after SUNY Potsdam (1816).

Fredonia was one of the state teachers' colleges traditionally specializing in music education, but now offers programs in other areas, including a graduate division. Areas of study include science, communication, music, education, and the social sciences. There are over 80 majors and over 50 minors.

== History ==
=== Fredonia Academy (1826–1867) ===
Opened in 1826 as "Fredonia Academy" under its first principal Austin Smith, the academy enrolled eight students. The first classes began on October 4, 1826. Within one year the academy had 136 students, 81 boys and 55 girls. In 1827 it was a state normal school.

The academy reached peak enrollment in 1856 with 217 students. The school was plagued by financial shortages and was forced to close its doors in 1867.

=== Normal School (1867–1948) ===
In 1867, the college re-emerged for its second phase of existence, as a New York State Normal School. On December 2, 1867, the Fredonia Normal School (as it became commonly known) began classes with 147 students, 62 boys and 85 girls. For students preparing to be teachers, no tuition was charged, books were supplied, and travel costs were reimbursed; in return, students had to promise to teach after graduation. Those students not studying for the teaching profession paid tuition and provided their own textbooks.

Fredonia Normal had a tumultuous existence. With a fluctuating student enrollment and threats of state funding reductions, the school seemed to be in constant jeopardy of closing. Nonetheless, gradually the school was upgraded. In 1930, fifty-eight acres (230,000 m^{2}) of land west of Central Avenue in the Village of Fredonia were bought to house a future campus. In 1938, music building (Mason Hall) was the first to be constructed on the Central Avenue site. New York State Governor Herbert Lehman signed the Feinberg Law in 1942 that changed all state Normal Schools into Teacher Colleges. With this new law, the school officially became the Fredonia State Teachers College.

=== State University System (1948–present) ===
With the formation of the State University of New York on March 13, 1948, the school's name changed again, becoming the State University of New York College at Fredonia. The college created a Division of the Humanities in 1958, and, in 1960, Fredonia was selected by the State University to grant the A.B. degree. Previously, Fredonia's curriculum was restricted to teacher training only.

From the 1940s through the early 1960s, additional buildings were erected: Fenton Hall (administration), Jewett Hall (sciences), Dods Hall (physical education and athletics), an addition to Mason Hall, and residence halls Gregory, Alumni, McGinnies, Chautauqua, and Nixon.

In 1968, the master plan for the modern Central Avenue campus was drafted by the architectural firm of I. M. Pei & Partners of New York at the request of then-president Oscar E. Lanford. A complex came into being that consisted of the Rockefeller Arts Center (building for fine arts), Maytum Hall (administration), Daniel A. Reed Library, McEwen Hall, Campus Center student union (now Williams Center), Houghton Hall (sciences), and LoGrasso Medical Center (infirmary). Maytum Hall, McEwen Hall (lecture rooms), Reed Library, and the Williams Center were all inter-connected, including an elevated walkway connecting McEwen Hall and the Williams Center. Also included in the plan were the suite-style residence halls Kasling, Disney, Grissom, Eisenhower, and Erie Dining Hall (now closed); In 1970, Pei and Cobb returned to Fredonia to construct the second suite-style residence halls of Hemingway, Schulz, Igoe, and Hendrix.

In the early 1970s a second addition was made to Mason Hall (including practice rooms), science building Houghton Hall, and multi-discipline Thompson Hall. In 1981, construction was finally begun on the long-awaited major indoor sports facility, Steele Hall, which had been delayed for nearly nine years due to state funding difficulties throughout much of the 1970s. More recent campus buildings and additions have been the University Commons residence and dining hall, additions to Steele and Mason Halls, and another long-awaited project—the new science building adjoining Houghton Hall. A stadium for athletics—mainly soccer and lacrosse—which included an upgraded, lighted playing field, was recently built over the existing playing fields.

Between 1981 and 1999, the school was an official training camp site of Buffalo Bills.

In 2023, the college received university designation from the state of New York, thus changing its name to its current State University of New York at Fredonia. Because of the university's multiple graduate level programs, SUNY Fredonia met the requirement for this change, that a state college have at least three.

=== Presidents ===
President	Tenure
Joseph A. Allen	1867–1869
J.W. Armstrong	1869–1898
Francis B. Palmer	1898–1907
Myron T. Dana	1908–1922
Howard Griffth Burdge	1922–1928
Hermann Cooper	1929–1931
Leslie R. Gregory	1931–1948
Harry W. Porter	1953–1961
Oscar E. Lanford	1961–1971
Dallas K. Beal	1971–1984
Donald A. MacPhee	1985–1996
Dennis L. Hefner	1997–2012
Virginia Schaefer Horvath	2012–2019
Dennis L. Hefner	2019–2020
Stephen H. Kolison, Jr.	2020–present

- Note: Earlier presidents were principals of Fredonia Academy and are not included in list.

== Buildings ==
=== Architecture ===
Architects I. M. Pei and Henry N. Cobb designed the master plan for the modernized campus in 1968. Many of the buildings are listed in architectural guides as examples of exceptional modern architecture. Some are described in architectural history books. The National Building Museum listed the SUNY Fredonia campus as one of I. M. Pei's ideal places to visit in its 1991 journal Blueprints.

Pei is credited with designing Maytum Hall, Williams Center, Reed Library, Rockefeller Arts Center, and McEwen Hall, as well as its characteristic circular perimeter road, aptly named Ring Road. The design of Daniel Reed Library earned Henry Cobb and I. M. Pei the 1969 Prestressed Concrete Institute Award.

=== Academic and administrative buildings ===
- Reed Library was constructed in 1969. It is approximately the size of a regulation football field, provides seating for over 850 readers, and houses over 250,000 books. It is named for Daniel A. Reed (1875–1959), U.S. Representative from the Fredonia area for over 40 years. A four-story addition to Reed Library, known as the Carnahan-Jackson Center, was constructed in 1992; it includes several study areas, a scholarship center, atrium, elevators, tower study lounge which leads to a fifth story, the Tutoring Center, and the Special Collections & Archives Division of Reed Library.
- Michael C. Rockefeller Arts Center, constructed in 1968, is named after the youngest son of former Governor Nelson A. Rockefeller, who disappeared in 1961 during an anthropological expedition in New Guinea. Designed by I. M. Pei and Partners, Rockefeller Arts Center includes King Concert Hall (a 1,200-seat concert hall), Marvel Theatre (a 400-seat proscenium theatre), Alice E. Bartlett Theatre (a 200-seat maximum black box theatre), an art gallery, and 24 classrooms. This building houses the Department of Theatre and Dance, and the Department of Visual Arts and New Media. The arts center was opened in 1968 by Clint Norton as its first managing director. He was followed by Robert B. D'Angelo, who served from 1970 to 1974 while he also serving as a speech writer and adviser to then Governor Nelson A. Rockefeller. Following D'Angelo in the directorship were Ted Dede, Nancy Palmer, Katherine Rushworth and Radford Thomas. Jefferson Westwood has served as director since 1982.
- Fenton Hall was named for Reuben Fenton (1819–1885), U.S. Senator, and Governor, who was born in Carroll, Chautauqua County. Fenton Hall houses the office of the University President, the Graduate Studies office, as well as classrooms, academic departments and Sprout Café. Computer Science, Modern Languages, English, and Philosophy are some of the departments located in Fenton.
- Mason Hall is home to the School of Music and was named after American music education pioneer Lowell Mason. This hall is actually three buildings, "Old Mason" (the oldest building on the present-day campus site), "New Mason," and the recent addition of two rehearsal rooms, which are all connected together. Mason Hall includes over 100 personal practice rooms, several small ensemble practice rooms, and large ensemble rooms. Both Juliet J. Rosch Recital Hall and Diers Recital Hall are located here, as well as two MIDI technology labs, and a Studio Recording Department.
- Maytum Hall is an eight-story, semi-circular office building and computer center, and was named after Arthur Maytum (1866–1953). He served as chairman of the Board of Visitors of the Fredonia Normal School and Teachers college from 1928 to 1953. He also served as supervisor of the Town of Pomfret from 1931 to 1938.
- Steele Hall is mainly used as a sports center with a basketball court, indoor track, and an ice rink which are used for both campus and community events. It also contains classrooms, a newly constructed natatorium, racquetball courts, dancing practice rooms, and many other facilities.
- Thompson Hall is the largest academic building at SUNY Fredonia. It houses the departments of Multicultural Affairs, Psychology, Political Science, Speech Pathology, Sociology, Business Administration, History, plus the College of Education. The building, planned during the period of nationwide campus upheavals in the late 1960s and early 1970s, was designed to be riot-proof, with its narrow stairwells, dimly lighted hallways, and no operable windows.
- Houghton Hall, Jewett Hall, and the Science Center are the three science buildings at SUNY Fredonia. They house the departments of Geology, Physics, Chemistry, Biology, and Biochemistry, and the 3-2 Cooperative Engineering Program. The Science Center features an observatory, a greenhouse, and an herbarium.
- LoGrasso Hall On campus medical services, along with counseling, and the office of international education.
- McEwen Hall Four-level building, Contains lecture halls, Sheldon Media Labs, and Fredonia Radio Systems (WCVF-FM).
- The College Lodge, located in Brocton, NY and operated by the Faculty Student Association at SUNY Fredonia, is a nature reserve and a certified experiential training facility and conference and events center that offers workforce development, employee training, meetings and other services for businesses and organizations.
- The Center for Innovation & Economic Development (CIED), located in Dunkirk, NY, is a facility that encourages and instructs the development of small businesses and entrepreneurship skills. The CIED was formerly called the Fredonia Technology Incubator.

=== Residence halls ===
SUNY Fredonia has 15 residence halls. Students have a choice of building style: corridor, suite, kitchen suite, or independent living. Corridor-style residence halls are long, staggered hallways with no sections, whereas suites are short corridors with either staggered hallways extending from the main corridor or doors leading into the individual suites.

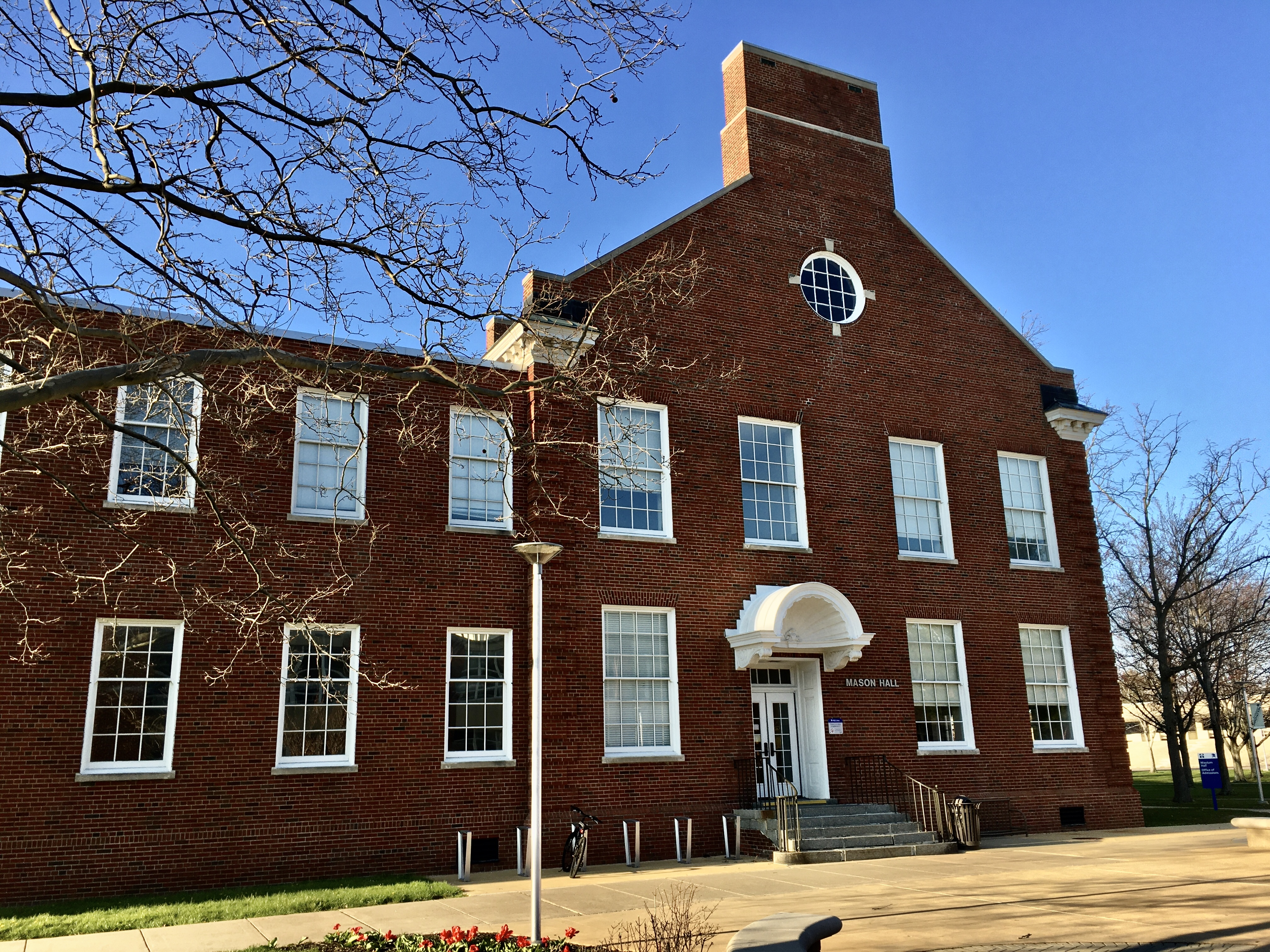
Mason Hall

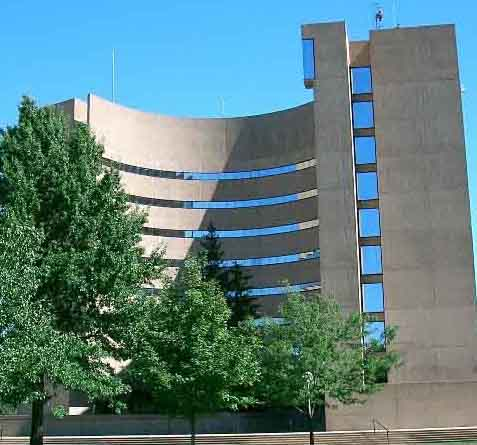
Maytum Hall

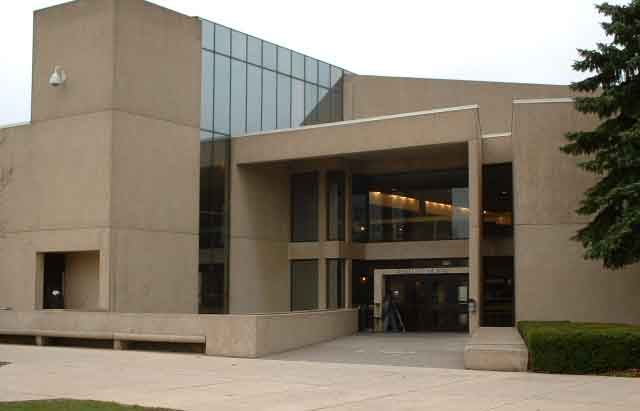
Williams Center

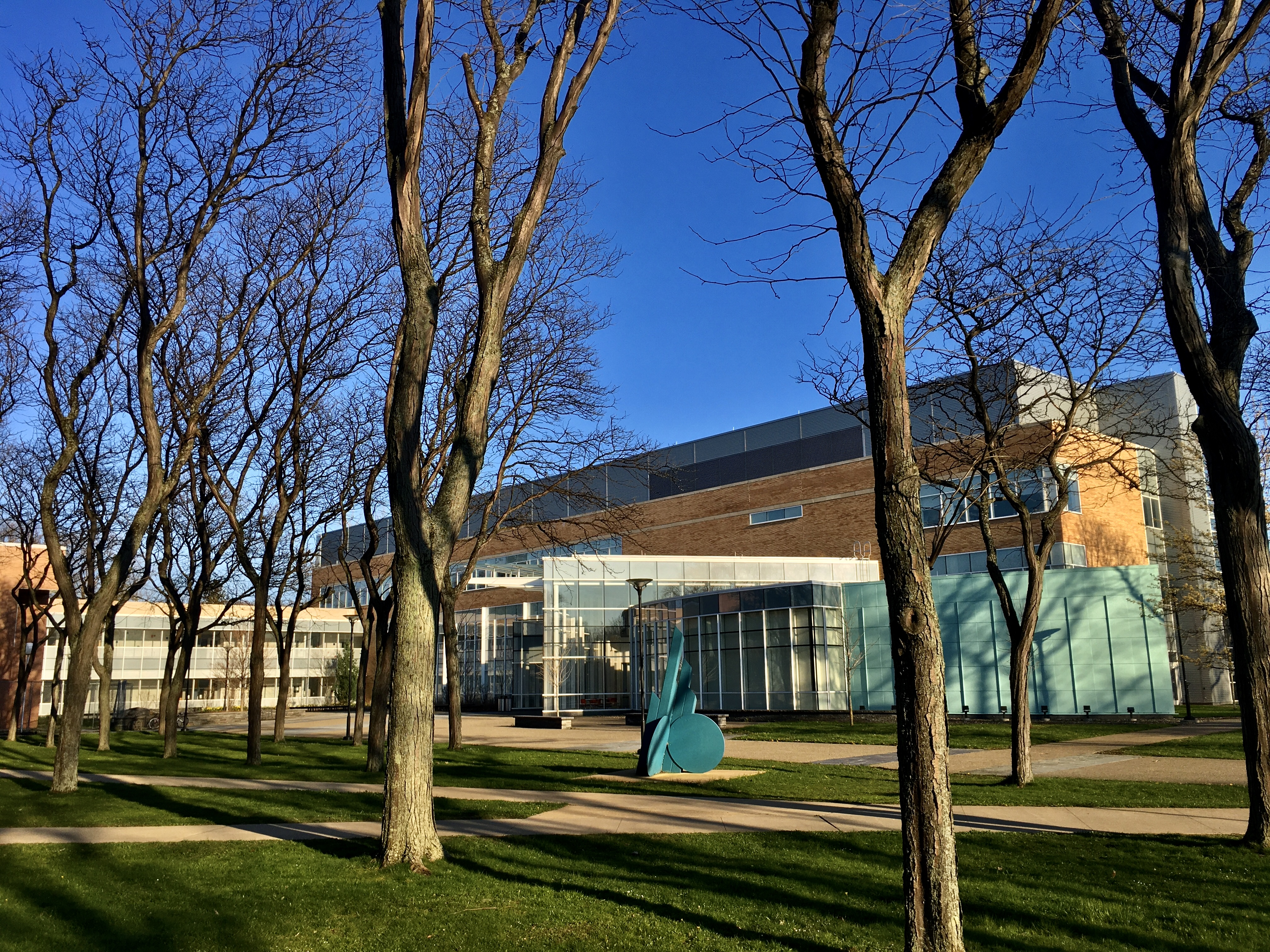
Science Center

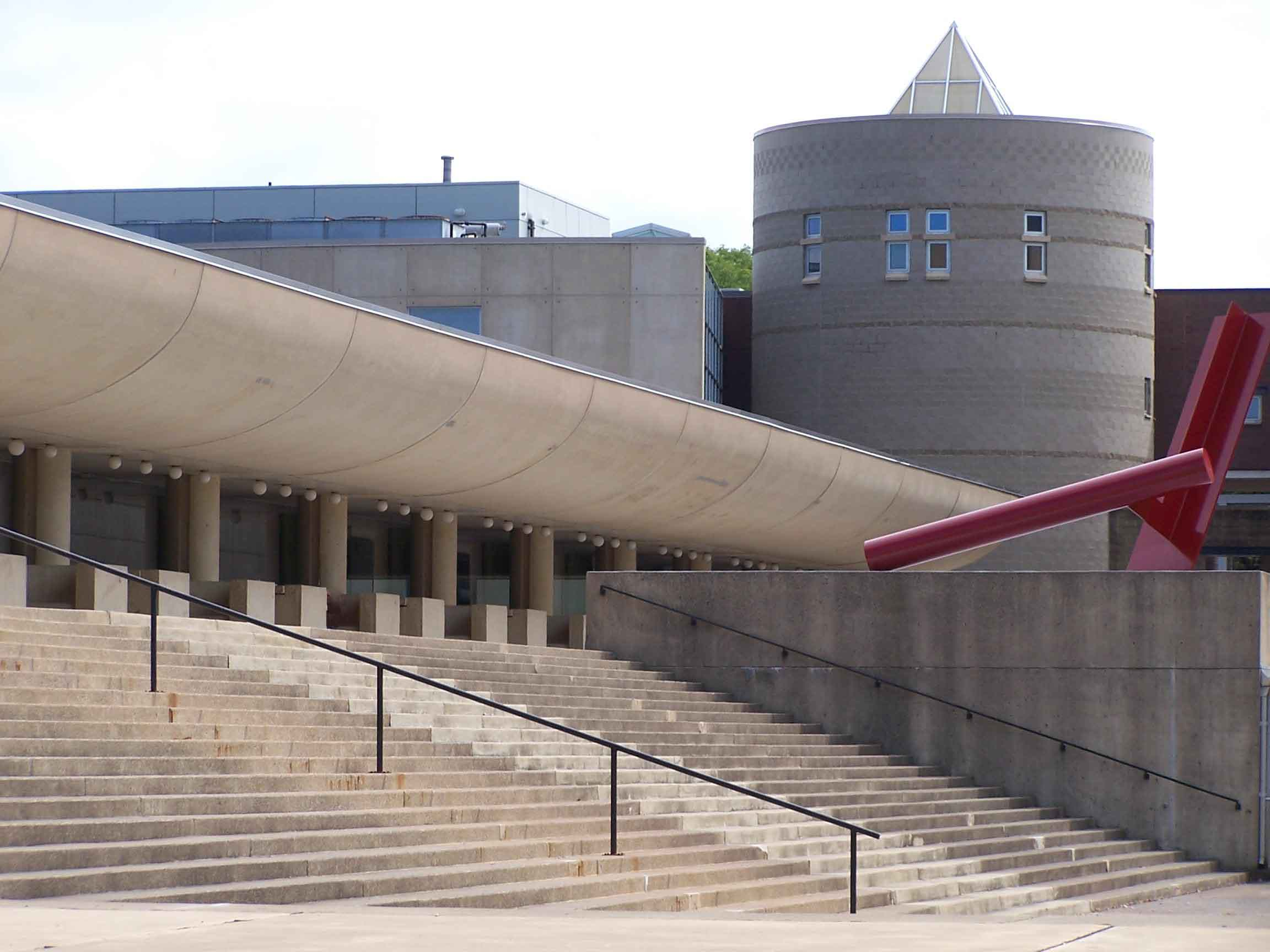
Daniel A. Reed Library with the addition built in 1992

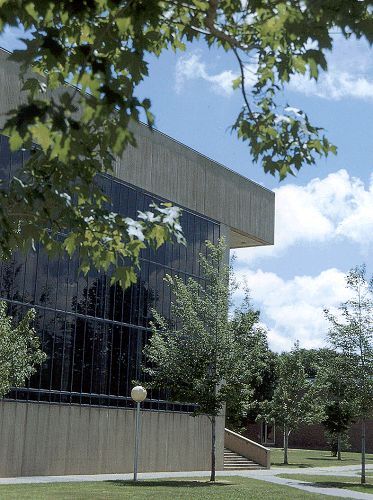
Rockefeller Arts Center

== Academic ==
=== Rankings ===
U.S. News & World Report's 2022–2023 edition of America's Best Colleges ranked Fredonia 70th on their list of Regional Universities North. Fredonia's graduate program in Speech-Language Pathology was ranked 146th.

Academic rankings

Master's
- Washington Monthly: 57

Regional
- U.S. News & World Report: 69

=== Colleges and schools ===
The university is organized into two colleges and two schools:

- College of Liberal Arts and Sciences
- College of Education, Health Sciences, and Human Services
- School of Business
- School of Music

== Student life ==
Undergraduate demographics as of Fall 2023
Race and ethnicity	Total
White	74%
Hispanic	11%
Black	7%
Two or more races	4%
Asian	1%
Unknown	1%
International student	1%
Economic diversity
Low-income (Note: The percentage of students who received an income-based federal Pell grant intended for low-income students.)	38%
Affluent (Note: The percentage of students who are a part of the American middle class at the bare minimum.)	62%

=== On-campus student media ===
WCVF-FM (88.9 MHz) is a college radio station in Fredonia, New York. The station is licensed to the State University of New York at Fredonia. CVF stands for "Campus and Community Voice of Fredonia," the station's slogan. The station primarily features alternative and indie rock, but includes an eclectic mix of genres. Listeners can catch a mix of classic rock, blues, jazz, folk, hip hop, and decade-specific hours, like 70s, 80s, 90s, and 2000s music. Live programs hosted by student and community jocks can be of any format or genre, from talk, music, and radio drama.

WCVF-FM also covers local and international news, written and read by students of the university. The radio station gives a voice to local and campus musicians, playing their music on the air. Local artists in the Western New York area submit their music to the station to be played on local music segments and during standard broadcasting hours. WCVF-FM broadcasts National Public Radio (NPR) Monday through Friday: Morning Edition (7–9 am) and All Things Considered (4–6 pm). These broadcasts are achieved through a partnership with NPR member station WQLN-FM in Erie, Pennsylvania. WCVF-FM has a sister station, WDVL 89.5 "The Inferno," which broadcasts via internet streaming.

The Normal Leader was created in May 1892 by the Agonian Society, an all-male literary organization, and later the Zetesian Society, an all-female organization. The first issues were entirely handwritten, and printed issues began with a renumbered Volume 1, Issue 1 in February 1893. The Normal Leader was a monthly newspaper, costing ten cents a copy or fifty cents for a yearly subscription. On September 28, 1936 The Normal Leader became The Leader on its Vol. XXXVI article No. 3, even though the school did not change its name to SUNY Fredonia until 1948. The Leader is produced by a team of Fredonia students. It is printed by The Jamestown Post-Journal in Jamestown, New York, and is distributed free on campus and in the surrounding community. Today, the paper features mainly news which is pertinent to the SUNY Fredonia campus and community. This bi-weekly publication comes out every Tuesday during the academic year, and can be found around the SUNY Fredonia campus.

WNYF is the student television station of the university. It is sponsored by the Student Association, and was founded in 1979 by two communications students. WNYF's programming includes student-produced programs ranging from entertainment, music, educational television and even a student-written soap opera. In the station's first few months of existence, it began televising the annual dance marathon that raised funds for muscular dystrophy. WNYF maintains an archive of every show produced by the students since 1979. The station was relocated several times, and settled into its current location in Hendrix Hall in 1997. In 2026, a flood in Hendrix Hall forced the station to relocate to McEwen Hall. WNYF formerly broadcast to the campus on cable TV Channel 8, and to the public-access television on Channels 17 in Fredonia and 19 in Dunkirk. Currently, all WNYF broadcasting is done through YouTube.

=== Athletics ===
SUNY Fredonia teams participate as a member of the National Collegiate Athletic Association's Division III. The Blue Devils are a member of the State University of New York Athletic Conference (SUNYAC). Men's sports include baseball, basketball, cross country, ice hockey, soccer, swimming & diving and track & field, while women's sports include basketball, cheerleading, cross country, lacrosse, soccer, softball, swimming & diving, tennis, track & field and volleyball.

When SUNY Fredonia was first known as the Fredonia Normal School, the athletics teams were known as the "Normalites". On January 27, 1936, The Leader issued an article which publicized a contest to come up with a new name for the teams. The committee had chosen two names, Blue Jackets and Blue Devils. The name Blue Devils seemed to be used more than Blue Jackets. In the issue of The Leader on September 30, 1952, the name Blue Devils was used officially for the first time.

== Notable alumni ==
=== Business ===
- Benjamin Franklin Goodrich, 1857 – founder of B.F. Goodrich tire company
- Karl Holz, 1973 – former president of Disney Cruise Lines
- James H. McGraw, 1884 – founder of McGraw-Hill Companies

=== Entertainment ===
- Nick Bernardone, 2008 – writer/producer, five-time Emmy multiple WGA Award winner/nominee and PGA Award winner
- Rich Ceisler, 1978 – stand-up comedian, actor, writer
- Jennifer Cody, 1991 – actress
- Pete Correale, 1992 – stand-up comedian
- Brian Frons, 1977 – president, daytime, Disney-ABC Television Group
- Peter Michael Goetz, 1965 – actor
- Mary McDonnell, 1974 – Academy Award-nominated actress
- Tom Pokel, 1991 – head coach, Italy national ice hockey team
- Andrea Romano, 1977 – casting and voice director; Peabody Award winner, Emmy Award winner
- Kevin Sylvester, 1995 – co-owner of the Buffalo Sports Page

=== Music ===
- Greg Collins, Grammy Award-winning recording engineer/producer
- Dave Fridmann – Grammy Award-winning recording engineer/producer
- Marcus Goldhaber, 2000 (BFA in Musical Theatre) – NYC-based jazz vocalist, bandleader
- Roberta Guaspari, 1969 – music educator
- Onaje Allan Gumbs, 1971 – pianist, composer, and bandleader
- James Houlik, 1964 – tenor saxophonist
- Don Menza – saxophonist, arranger, composer, jazz educator
- Bob McChesney – studio and jazz trombonist
- Kevin Moore – original keyboardist for Dream Theater
- Chris Poland, 1981 – guitar player for heavy metal band Megadeth
- Stephen Roessner, 2004 – Grammy Award-winning recording engineer/producer
- Gar Samuelson, 1982 – drummer for heavy metal band Megadeth

=== Politics, government and law ===
- Paul Cambria, 1969 – First Amendment lawyer
- William Conrad III, 2000 – member of the New York State Assembly
- Marcus M. Drake, 1852 – mayor of Buffalo, 1882
- Reuben Fenton – U.S. senator and governor of New York State 1865–1868 (attended part of a term at Fredonia Academy)
- James Brendan Foley, 1979 – diplomat, served as U.S. ambassador to the Republic of Haiti, and U.S. ambassador to the Republic of Croatia
- Ozra Amander Hadley – governor of Arkansas 1871–1873
- Robert Spitzer, 1975 – political scientist
- Frank Manly Thorn, lawyer, politician, government official, essayist, journalist, humorist, and inventor, sixth superintendent of the United States Coast and Geodetic Survey (1885–1889)

=== Literature and education ===
- Lucille Clifton, 1955 – poet
- Gaelen Foley, 1991 – author
- Greta Morine-Dershimer – education researcher
- Neil Postman, 1953 – educator and author
- Wendy Corsi Staub, 1986 – author
- Jean Webster, 1894 – novelist; graduated from Fredonia Normal School

=== Science ===
- Jeffery W. Kelly, 1982 – B.S. Chemistry
- Michael Marletta, 1973 – chemist and MacArthur Fellow

=== Sports ===
- Bryan Hodgson, 2011 – basketball coach
