= Robert Spitzer (political scientist) =

American political scientist (born 1953)

Robert James Spitzer (born September 12, 1953) is an American political scientist, commentator, and author. Spitzer is the author of numerous books, articles, essays, papers, and op-eds on many topics related to American politics. His areas of specialty include the American presidency and gun politics.

== Career ==
Spitzer is a distinguished service professor emeritus of the political science department at the State University of New York (SUNY) at Cortland. He taught at SUNY Cortland from 1979 to 2021 and as a visiting professor at Cornell University for thirty years. At Cortland, he served as chair of the Political Science Department from 1983 to 1989, 2005 to 2006, and from 2008 to 2020. He served as a member of the New York State Commission on the Bicentennial of the U.S. Constitution from 1986 to 1990. At Cortland, he taught many courses in the political science department, including Introduction to American Politics, The American Presidency, the Legislative Process, and Gun Policy. Since 2023 he has been an adjunct professor at the College of William & Mary School of Law.

== Work ==
=== Views on American presidency ===
In 1983 Spitzer's first book, The Presidency and Public Policy, challenged the model for presidential success espoused by Richard E. Neustadt with a policy approach based on Theodore J. Lowi's "arenas of power." Spitzer argued that the type of policy proposed by a president, not personal political skill, shaped the president's success in Congress. Michael A. Genovese felt "a more explicit application" to Lyndon Johnson's and Ronald Reagan's early years would have improved Spitzer's study, but otherwise gave it a collegial thumbs-up.

Prior to 1988's The Presidential Veto, there had been no analytical, book-length account of the subject in almost 100 years. Spitzer's work examines its history and concludes that the presidential veto has lost the revisionary power as the Founder's understood it at the Constitutional Convention. Melvin A. Kulbicki called the book an excellent text and a "well-written blend of theory and practical politics."

Spitzer served as president of the Presidency Research Group, later renamed the Presidents and Executive Politics section, of the American Political Science Association from 2001 to 2003.

=== Gun control ===
Since the 1980s, Spitzer has written books, spoken at public gatherings, written articles for newspapers, and appeared on numerous radio and television shows about gun control. His written work on the subject has appeared in the Washington Post and the New York Daily News. He has appeared on NPR's Fresh Air With Terry Gross and on MSNBC's Countdown with Keith Olbermann.

After former president Jimmy Carter wrote an op-ed about the 1994 assault weapons ban, the New York Times asked its readers, "Where do you stand on assault weapons?" Spitzer replied that one approach to "breaking the political deadlock over gun control" would be to treat it like international arms relations and "renounce disarmament but embrace arms control, especially for weapons of military origin."

Prior to and since the United States Supreme Court rulings in District of Columbia v. Heller (2008) and McDonald v. Chicago (2010), Spitzer also argues that history and prior law do not support the individualist interpretation of the Second Amendment reflected in these two recent court rulings. Since the cases were handed down, he wrote: "The Heller and McDonald rulings established, as a matter of law, an individual rights interpretation of the Second Amendment. But while judges can change the law, they cannot change history, and the historical record largely contradicts the bases for these two recent rulings."

Spitzer is the author of seven books on gun control: The Politics of Gun Control, The Right to Bear Arms, Gun Control: A Documentary and Reference Guide, coauthor, along with Glenn H. Utter, of Encyclopedia of Gun Control and Gun Rights, Guns across America: Reconciling Gun Rules and Rights, The Gun Dilemma: How History is Against Expanded Gun Rights. and Gun Law History: How Three-Hundred Years of Weapons Laws Built the Nation

=== Other work ===
In addition to the American presidency and gun politics, Spitzer has researched and written on many topics related to American politics and public policy, including the behavior of American institutions, national elections, the mass media, the Constitution, and New York State politics and policy. His monograph The Right to Life Movement and Third Party Politics was a close examination of the New York-based Right to Life political party. His book Saving the Constitution from Lawyers: How Legal Education and Law Reviews Distort Constitutional Meaning, argues that legal training serves the practice of law well, but, according to the Harvard Law Review, "presents a sharp critique of the 'wayward constitutional theorizing' published in law journals." Pulitizer Prize winning historian Jack Rakove said of this book, "Nowhere is the gap between pretension and performance [in legal education] more evident than in the realm of constitutional law, and Robert Spitzer explains why." Since 1997, Spitzer has been series editor for the book series on American Constitutionalism published by SUNY Press.

== Personal life and education ==
Spitzer was born in Utica, New York in 1953. He received his A.B. degree, summa cum laude, from SUNY Fredonia in 1975, his master's degree from Cornell University in 1978, and his Ph.D. from Cornell University in 1980.

https://global.oup.com/academic/product/gun-law-history-9780197857267?lang=en&cc=usItalic text==Partial bibliography==

- 1983 The Presidency and Public Policy
- 1987 The Right to Life Movement and Third Party Politics
- 1988 The Presidential Veto
- 1990 The Bicentennial of the U.S. Constitution
- 1993 President and Congress
- 1993 Media and Public Policy
- 1995 The Politics of Gun Control (10th edition, 2026)
- 2000 Politics and Constitutionalism
- 2001 The Right to Bear Arms
- 2002 Essentials of American Politics
- 2005 The Presidency and the Constitution (with Michael Genovese)
- 2008 Saving the Constitution from Lawyers
- 2009 Gun Control: A Documentary and Reference Guide
- 2011 Encyclopedia of Gun Control and Gun Rights (with Glenn Utter)
- 2015 Guns across America: Reconciling Gun Rules and Rights
- 2021 We the People: Essentials Edition (13th ed., co-author)
- 2023 The Gun Dilemma: How History is Against Expanded Gun Rights
- 2026 Gun Law History: How Three-Hundred Years of Weapons Laws Built the Nation. Oxford University Press
