= WNYF-TV =

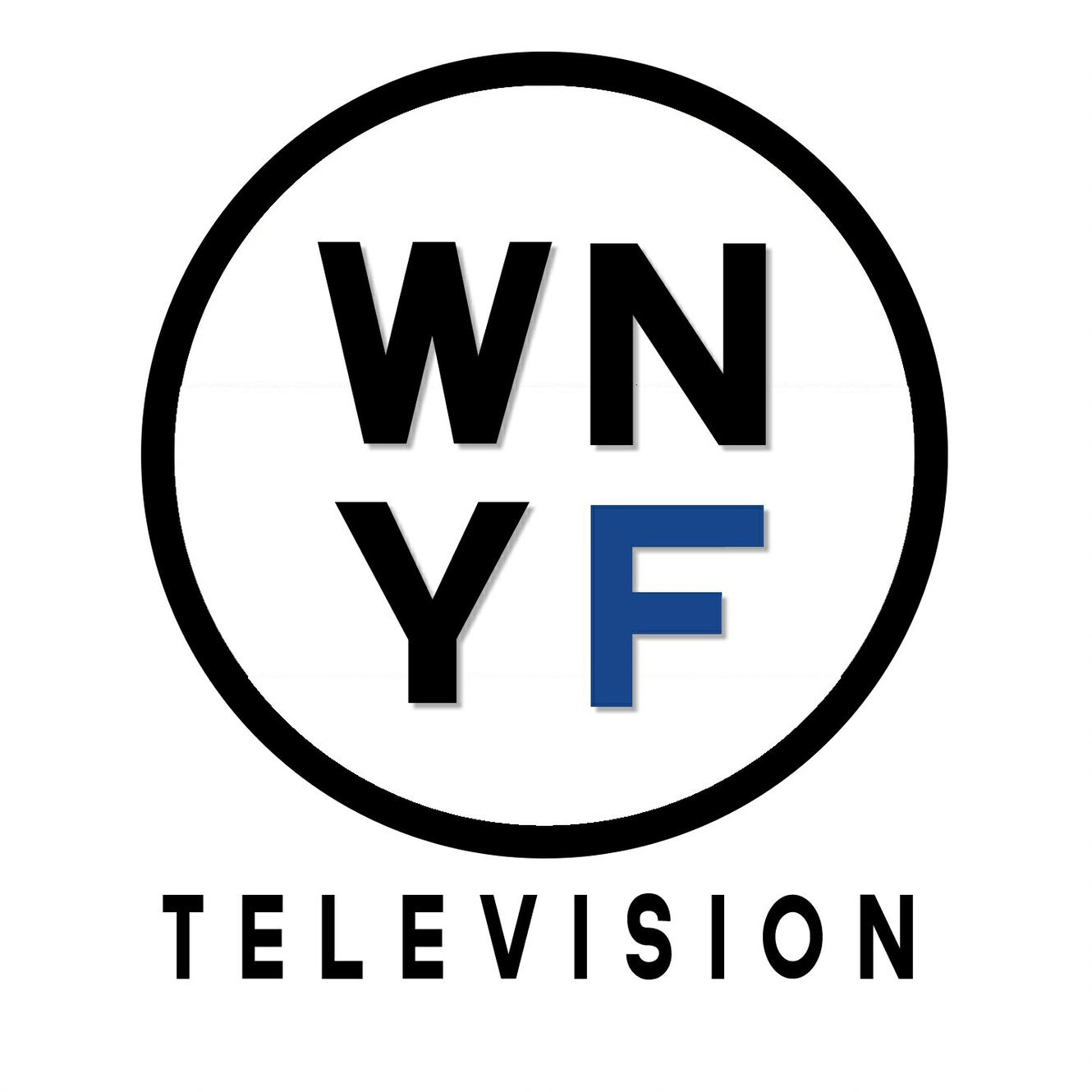
- Fredonia, New York; United States
- City: Fredonia
- Channels: Digital: Campus Channel 11
- Branding: WNYF Television

Programming
- Affiliations: College Broadcasters Inc.

Ownership
- Owner: Student Assembly of the State University of New York (SUNY SA)

History
- Founded: 1979
- Former channel number: Campus Channel 6 Campus Channel 8
- Call sign meaning: Western New York Fredonia

Technical information
- Translator(s): Village of Fredonia: Channel 17 City of Dunkirk: Channel 19

Links
- Website: www.wnyftv.com

WNYF-TV is the student-run TV station of the State University of New York at Fredonia. Sponsored by the Student Association, WNYF was founded in 1979 by two communications students, Robert Raff and Ken Kazubowski. At the time, the TV and Radio majors (BA) were classified under Special Studies, and students developed a custom degree program. Students were limited in hands-on time in the existing black and white studio, and the color studio controlled by the IRC was often booked for months at a time. WNYF immediately gave students enhanced opportunities to develop the necessary skills to excel in the TV industry.

The original student leaders, along with John Malcolm and engineer Bob Kovacs, were able to locate surplus video equipment scattered across the many departments of the college. Negotiations, trades and some "midnight raids" produced almost enough equipment to get the station running. The only piece missing was a small master control switcher, which was purchased with the very first funding from the Student Association.

WNYF's original local programming included a wide variety of student produced programs ranging from entertainment, music, educational and even a student-written soap opera. In the station's first few months of existence, it began televising the annual dance marathon known as Superdance. The event raised funds for Muscular Dystrophy. The around-the-clock coverage of the dance raised the awareness and prestige of this event and substantially increased participation over the next few years.

WNYF maintains an archive of every show produced by the students since then. Relocated several times, WNYF settled into in State University of New York at Hendrix Hall in 1997. In 2026, a flood in Hendrix Hall forced the station to relocate to McEwen Hall.

WNYF formerly broadcast to the campus on cable Channel 11, and to community on Channels 17 in Fredonia and 19 in Dunkirk. Due to budget restrictions and the waning popularity of cable TV, cable broadcasts were ceased in the 2020s. The station currently uploads every episode to their YouTube channel.
