= Marcus Goldhaber =

American jazz musician (born 1978)

Marcus Goldhaber (born September 13, 1978) is NYC based American Jazz vocalist from Buffalo, New York. His debut album, The Moment After, was released in 2006.

== Early life and education ==
A native of Buffalo, New York, Goldhaber, learned songs from the Great American Songbook from his mother, who played them on the piano. After graduating from SUNY Fredonia with a degree in Musical Theater, he worked as an actor in New York City.

== Influences ==
Influences he cites Chet Baker, Harry Connick Jr., and Sarah Vaughn.

== Discography ==
- The Moment After (2006)
- Take Me Anywhere (2008)
- Almost Love (2012)
- A Lovely Way to Spend an Evening (2014)
- Carry You On (2017)
