= United States Post Office (Fredonia, New York) =

- US Post Office--Fredonia
- U.S. National Register of Historic Places
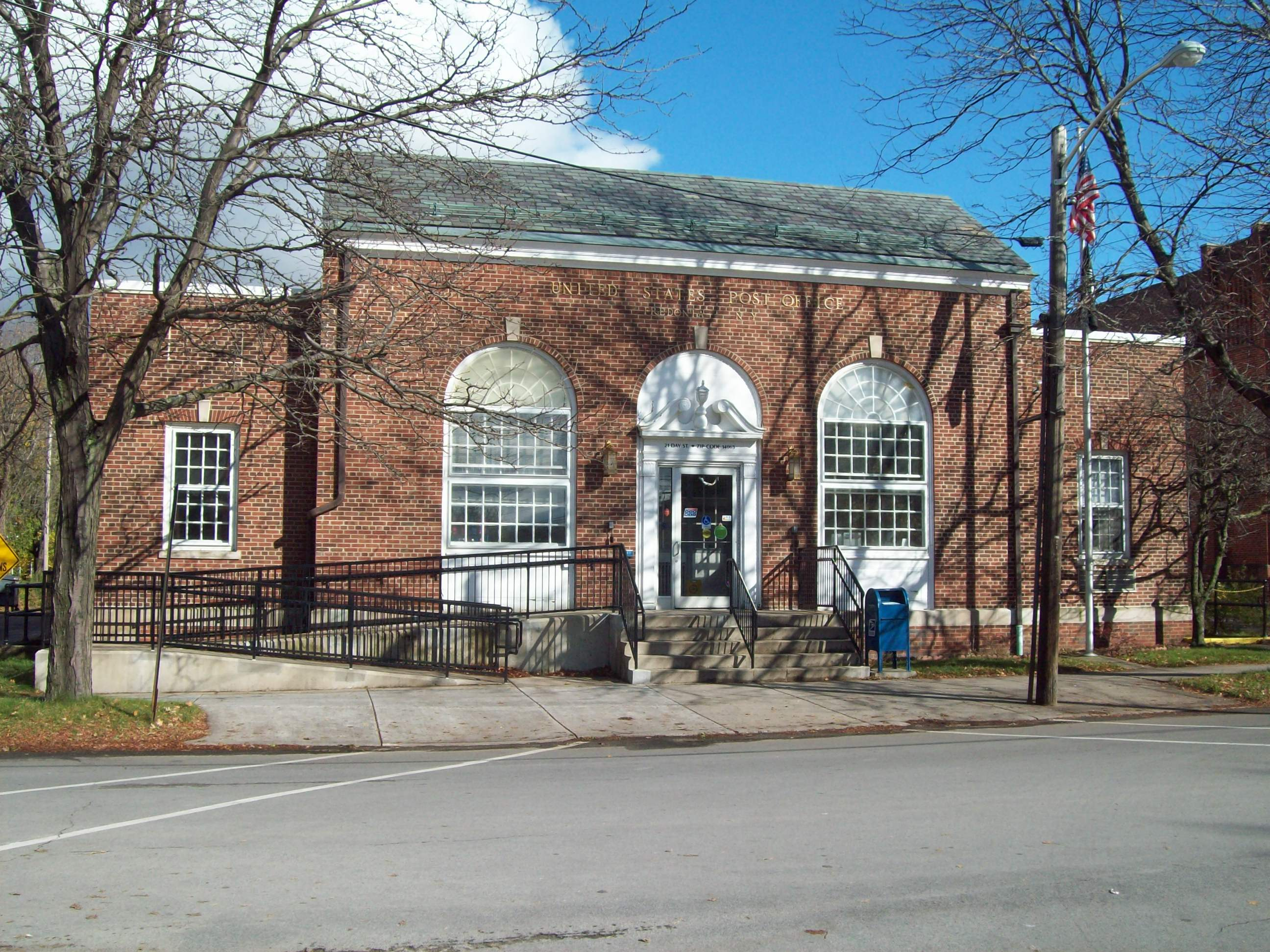
- U.S. Post Office, November 2010

- Location within New York Location within the United States
- Interactive map showing the location for U.S. Post Office-Fredonia
- Location: 21 Day St., Fredonia, New York
- Coordinates: 42°26′28″N 79°19′57″W
- Built: 1935
- Architect: Simon, Louis A.; Blanch, Arnold
- Architectural style: Colonial Revival
- MPS: US Post Offices in New York State, 1858-1943, TR
- NRHP reference No.: 88002515
- Added to NRHP: November 17, 1988

US Post Office—Fredonia is a historic post office building located at Fredonia in Chautauqua County, New York, and within the boundaries of the Fredonia Commons Historic District. It was designed and built in 1935–36 as a Works Progress Administration project, and is one of a number of post offices in New York State designed by the Office of the Supervising Architect of the Treasury Department, Louis A. Simon. It is a one-story, five bay brick structure set on a brick foundation in the Colonial Revival style. The central section features three large round arched openings with cast-stone keystones. The interior features "The Harvest"; a mural from 1937 by artist Arnold Blanch.

It was listed on the National Register of Historic Places in 1989.
