= Canadaway Creek =

River in New York, United States

Coordinates: 42°28′36″N 79°22′08″W

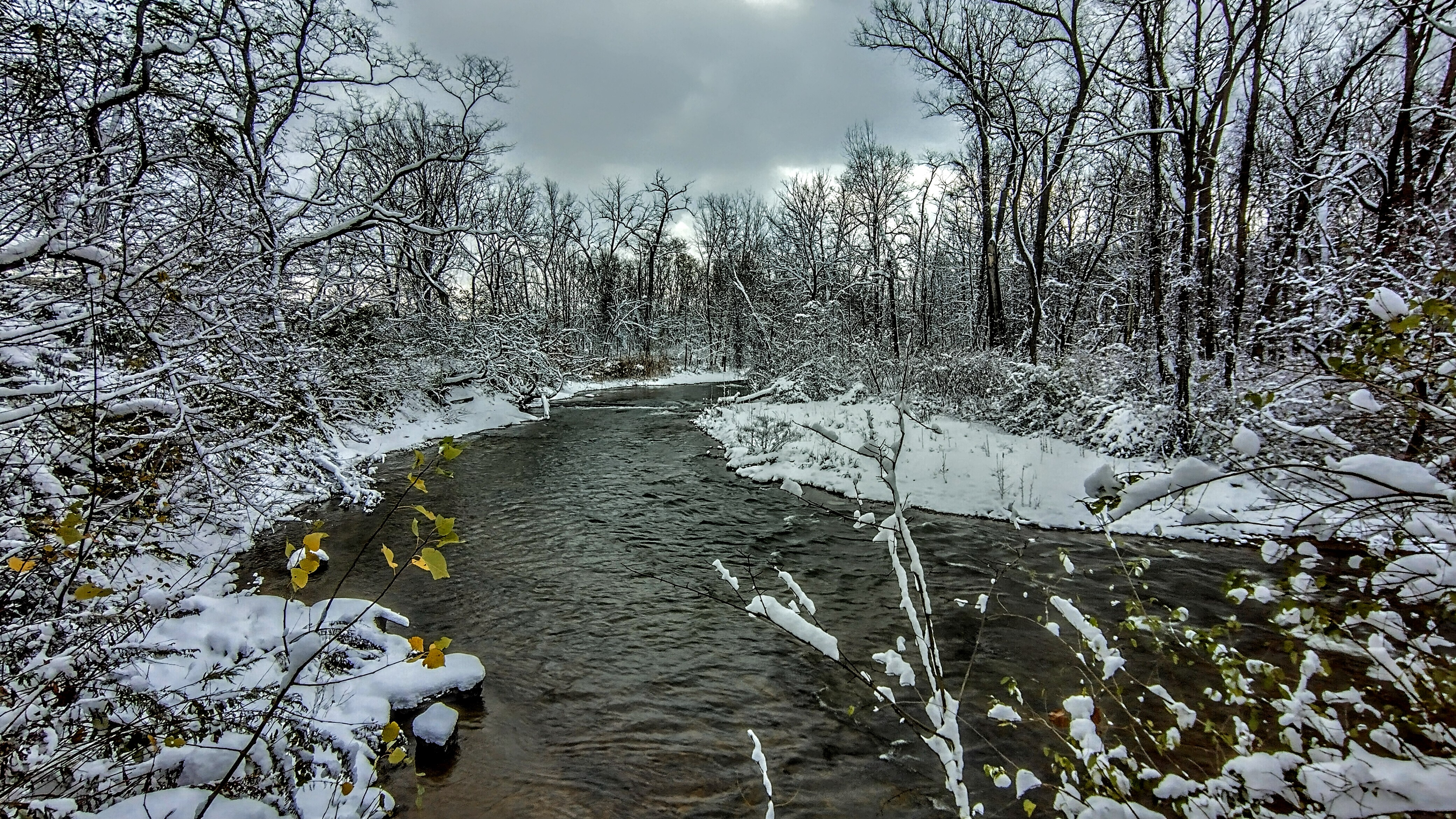
Canadaway Creek in Fredonia, New York

Canadaway Creek is a stream in Chautauqua County, New York, which empties into Lake Erie in Dunkirk, New York.

Non-natives settled on the creek first in 1804, in what was first called "Canadaway" and became Fredonia, New York.
