= Fredonia, New York =

Fredonia, New York Seneca: Ganë́'daweö
- Village
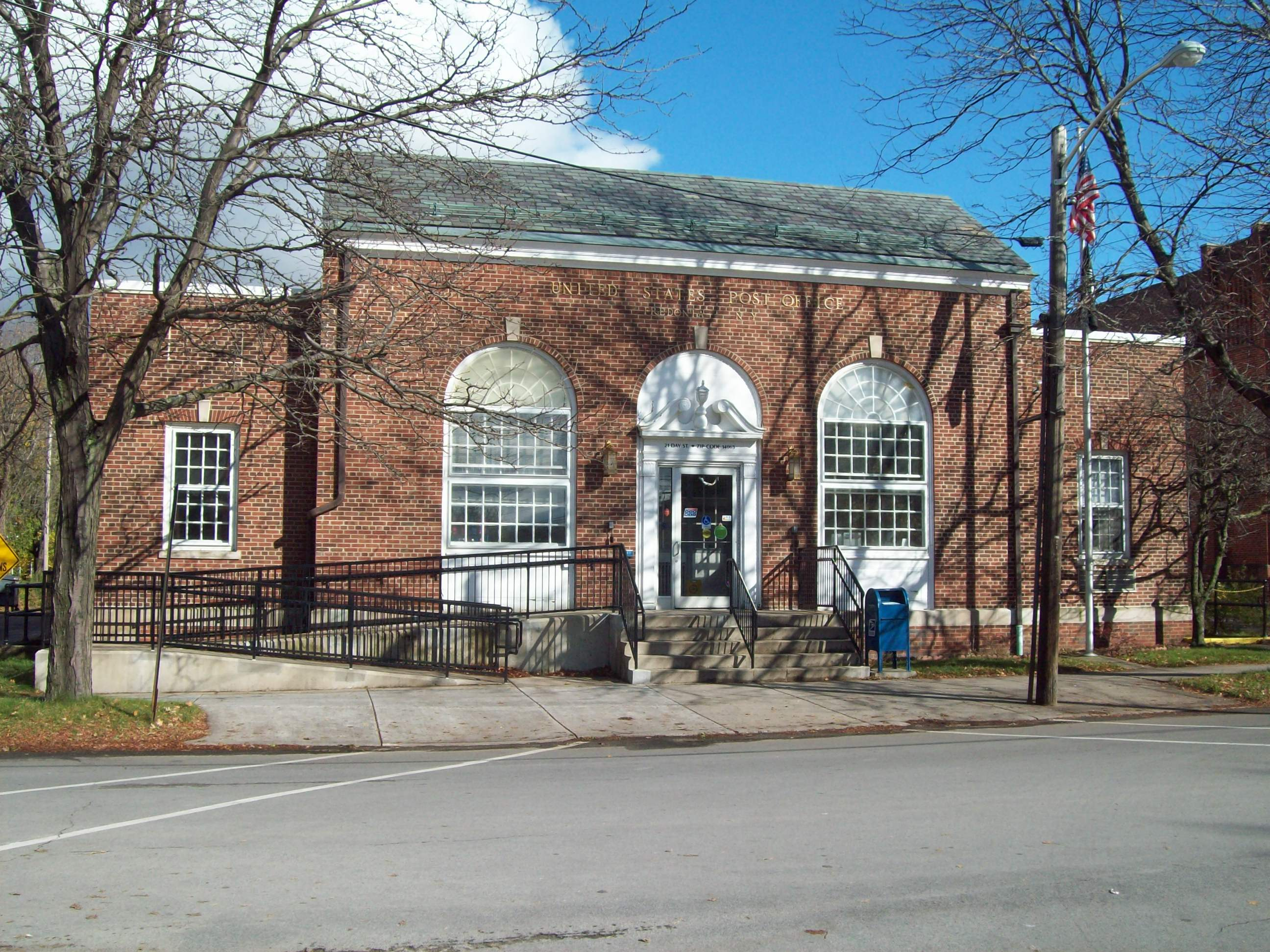
- Post Office, Fredonia, NY

- Location within the state of New York
- Coordinates: 42°26′26″N 79°19′55″W
- Country: United States
- State: New York
- County: Chautauqua
- Town: Pomfret

Area
  - Total: 5.14 sq mi (13.30 km^{2})
  - Land: 5.14 sq mi (13.30 km^{2})
  - Water: 0 sq mi (0.00 km^{2})
- Elevation: 720 ft (220 m)

Population (2020)
  - Total: 9,585
  - Density: 1,866.0/sq mi (720.46/km^{2})
- Time zone: UTC-5 (Eastern (EST))
  - Summer (DST): UTC-4 (EDT)
- ZIP code: 14063
- Area code: 716
- FIPS code: 36-27419
- GNIS feature ID: 2390851
- Website: www.villageoffredoniany.com

Fredonia (Seneca: Ganë́'daweö) is a village in Chautauqua County, New York, United States. The population was 9,871 as of the 2020 census. Fredonia is in the town of Pomfret south of Lake Erie. The village is the home of the State University of New York at Fredonia (in the northwest part of the village).

Fredonia is one of only twelve villages in New York still incorporated under a charter, the other villages having incorporated or re-incorporated under the provisions of Village Law.

== History ==
The village that is now Fredonia was most likely first occupied by early Mound Builders, then the Erie people (13th to 17th centuries), then the Seneca people of the Iroquois.

The area's original name was Canadaway (from the Seneca word Ganadawao, meaning "among the hemlocks"). The Seneca know it today as Ganë́'daweö.

In 1791, Robert Morris purchased the Fredonia land from Massachusetts and sold it to the Holland Land Company. Parcels were sold to pioneers around 1800, and the first settlers came around 1803 or 1804. Among the first settlers included Zattu Cushing, the county's first judge, and David Eason, the county's first sheriff.

In 1821, William Hart dug the first well specifically to produce natural gas in the United States on the banks of Canadaway Creek in Fredonia. It was 27 feet (8.2 m) deep, excavated with shovels by hand, and its gas pipeline was hollowed out logs sealed with tar and rags. It supplied enough natural gas for lights in two stores, two shops and a gristmill (currently the village's fire station) by 1825. Expanding on Hart's work, the Fredonia Gas Light Company was formed in 1858, becoming the first American natural gas company. A stone monument in downtown Fredonia marks the site of the first gas well.

In 1829, the village of Fredonia was incorporated. The name "Fredonia" was coined by Samuel Latham Mitchill, coupling the English word "freedom" with a Latin ending. Mitchill proposed it as a replacement name for the United States. It failed in that regard, but became the name of many towns and cities.

The earliest recorded argument in its favor is found in a broadside, printed probably in 1803, with the title Generic Names for the Country and People of the United States of America. The text refers to its “authors” who “are citizens of the United States, and are zealous for their prosperity, honour, and reputation. They wish them to possess a name among the nations of the earth. They lament that hitherto and at present the country is destitute of one.” The piece is signed, and some of the phrases used match those in later writings known to be Mitchill’s, so this 1803 broadside is also ascribed to him. It is impossible to tell if there really was a group for whom Mitchill was writing, or if that was merely a pious fiction. - Chautauqua County, New York

Established within 20 years of the founding of Fredonia, the Fredonia Academy was the first higher educational institution in Chautauqua County. It was started in 1824 and opened in 1826. The academy became a State Normal School in 1866. On August 8, 1867, the cornerstone of the Fredonia Normal School was laid on a site where the Old Main building stands today. The Normal School used the academy's building, which stood on the site of the present village hall, until the Old Normal was completed in 1868. The Fredonia Normal School is now One Temple Square and Association, a 91-unit, NY HUD housing project for the disabled and the elderly that was started by Henry F. Sysol Jr. in the late 1970s. Thereafter the academy building was used for some time as fire department headquarters.

Today the building houses the village offices and includes the 1891 Fredonia Opera House, a former vaudeville theater that fell into disrepair in the 1970s while being operated as a movie house. The theater underwent a complete nine-year restoration in the 1980s by the Fredonia Preservation Society and a cadre of volunteers. It now serves as a year-round performing arts center. In 1930 under the director of the Normal School, Hermann Cooper, 58 acres (230,000 m^{2}) of land west of Central Avenue were bought with the dream that one day it would become a campus. The construction of a music building took place in 1939, and in 1942 the Feinberg Law converted the Normal School into a teachers college. In 1948 the college became a vital part of the new State University of New York (SUNY) system.

In the mid-19th century Fredonia became the home of the first dues-paying Grange. The United States' first Grange Hall was erected in Fredonia in 1868, and the original building (Grange Hall #1) still stands on Main Street. Fredonia was also host to the first meeting of the Woman's Christian Temperance Union, which was held at the Fredonia Baptist Church in 1873.

=== Italian immigration ===
Beginning in the late 1880s, Fredonia began seeing a large number of Sicilian immigrants from Valledolmo, Sicily. Subsequent the unification of the Kingdom of Italy many immigrants moved to the lush grape growing region to have a better life and seeking the ability to purchase land their ancestors were denied for centuries by the despotic Bourbon Kings of Sicily. You can still see the impact these immigrants made in growth of the town. Most predominantly, Saint Anthony of Padua Roman Catholic Church, originally San Antonio's, named after the patron saint of Valledolmo, Italy. You can also see the strong Italian influence in the arts, music and culinary traditions which remain similar to foods and traditions back in Italy.

During the Olympic torch's trip in the 1996 Atlanta Summer Games, sixth-grade teacher Kate Leary from Fredonia Middle School carried the torch as it went through the town on U.S. Route 20.

The Fredonia State campus was the location of training camps for two major professional sports teams: the Buffalo Bills of the NFL, and the Buffalo Braves of the NBA. The Braves relocated to San Diego (as the renamed San Diego Clippers) in 1978, and the Bills moved their training camp in 2000 to St. John Fisher College near Rochester, New York.

Samuel L. Clemens, better known as Mark Twain, had connections to Fredonia, via relatives.

The Fredonia Commons Historic District was listed on the National Register of Historic Places in 1978. The U.S. Post Office was listed in 1988.

On January 28, 2020, Fredonia was named the winner of the 2020 Small Business Revolution reality show, which aired on Hulu and Amazon Prime. The show began filming in March 2020 just before the COVID-19 pandemic was declared.

== Geography ==
Fredonia is located at 42°26′27″N 79°20′02″W in the northern part of the town of Pomfret. It is bordered to the north by the town and city of Dunkirk.

According to the United States Census Bureau, the village has a total area of 5.2 square miles (13.4 km^{2}), all of it land, though it does have a small stream flowing northward through the village to Lake Erie called Canadaway Creek.

U.S. Route 20 passes through the village. Exit 59 on the New York State Thruway, which passes north of the village, serves both Fredonia and Dunkirk by way of New York State Route 60.

Climate data for Fredonia / Portland, New York (1981–2010 normals, extremes 1914–present (Note: Climatological records maintained at the Fredonia COOP (42.4496°N 79.3119°W) from January 1914 to August 2011, and at the Portland 1 SW COOP (42.3717°N 79.4866°W) since September 2011.))
Month	Jan	Feb	Mar	Apr	May	Jun	Jul	Aug	Sep	Oct	Nov	Dec	Year
Record high °F (°C)	73 (23)	75 (24)	82 (28)	91 (33)	91 (33)	96 (36)	98 (37)	98 (37)	97 (36)	91 (33)	82 (28)	74 (23)	98 (37)
Mean daily maximum °F (°C)	33.6 (0.9)	36.2 (2.3)	44.8 (7.1)	57.9 (14.4)	68.4 (20.2)	77.1 (25.1)	80.5 (26.9)	79.1 (26.2)	73.0 (22.8)	61.6 (16.4)	50.5 (10.3)	38.2 (3.4)	58.5 (14.7)
Mean daily minimum °F (°C)	20.5 (−6.4)	20.9 (−6.2)	27.4 (−2.6)	38.2 (3.4)	48.4 (9.1)	58.2 (14.6)	62.8 (17.1)	61.8 (16.6)	55.5 (13.1)	45.2 (7.3)	36.4 (2.4)	26.3 (−3.2)	41.9 (5.5)
Record low °F (°C)	−17 (−27)	−26 (−32)	−16 (−27)	4 (−16)	27 (−3)	35 (2)	43 (6)	37 (3)	32 (0)	21 (−6)	7 (−14)	−13 (−25)	−26 (−32)
Average precipitation inches (mm)	2.84 (72)	2.13 (54)	2.59 (66)	3.27 (83)	3.57 (91)	3.71 (94)	4.09 (104)	3.70 (94)	4.50 (114)	4.21 (107)	4.10 (104)	3.22 (82)	41.93 (1,065)
Average snowfall inches (cm)	24.5 (62)	15.4 (39)	10.3 (26)	2.4 (6.1)	0.3 (0.76)	0 (0)	0 (0)	0 (0)	0 (0)	0.2 (0.51)	5.0 (13)	21.0 (53)	79.1 (201)
Average precipitation days (≥ 0.01 in)	14.3	11.7	11.2	10.5	10.1	9.2	9.1	8.7	9.1	10.1	11.7	13.6	129.3
Average snowy days (≥ 0.1 in)	10.3	7.0	4.8	1.1	0.1	0	0	0	0	0.1	2.2	7.9	33.5
Source: NOAA

== Demographics ==
Historical population
Census	Pop.	Note	%±
1870	2,546		—
1880	2,692		5.7%
1890	3,399		26.3%
1900	4,127		21.4%
1910	5,286		28.1%
1920	6,051		14.5%
1930	5,814		−3.9%
1940	5,738		−1.3%
1950	7,095		23.6%
1960	8,477		19.5%
1970	10,326		21.8%
1980	11,126		7.7%
1990	10,436		−6.2%
2000	10,706		2.6%
2010	11,230		4.9%
2020	9,585		−14.6%
2021 (est.)	9,809	▲	2.3%
U.S. Decennial Census

=== 2020 census ===
As of the 2020 census, Fredonia had a population of 9,585. The median age was 27.7 years. 14.8% of residents were under the age of 18 and 16.3% of residents were 65 years of age or older. For every 100 females there were 87.1 males, and for every 100 females age 18 and over there were 85.2 males age 18 and over.

99.8% of residents lived in urban areas, while 0.2% lived in rural areas.

There were 3,549 households in Fredonia, of which 22.7% had children under the age of 18 living in them. Of all households, 35.5% were married-couple households, 23.7% were households with a male householder and no spouse or partner present, and 32.5% were households with a female householder and no spouse or partner present. About 38.1% of all households were made up of individuals and 14.8% had someone living alone who was 65 years of age or older.

There were 4,151 housing units, of which 14.5% were vacant. The homeowner vacancy rate was 2.4% and the rental vacancy rate was 11.2%.

Racial composition as of the 2020 census
Race	Number	Percent
White	7,968	83.1%
Black or African American	407	4.2%
American Indian and Alaska Native	29	0.3%
Asian	204	2.1%
Native Hawaiian and Other Pacific Islander	4	0.0%
Some other race	284	3.0%
Two or more races	689	7.2%
Hispanic or Latino (of any race)	848	8.8%

=== 2010 census ===
As of the 2010 census, there were 11,230 people (an increase of 524 people or 4.89%) and 3,811 households (an increase of 170 or 4.69%). The population density was 2,159.6 inhabitants per square mile (833.8/km^{2}). The racial makeup of the village was: 93.82% (10,536 people) white; 1.80% (202 people) African-American; 1.61% (181 people) Asian; 0.27% (30 people) Native American/Alaskan; 0.04% (4 people) Native Hawaiian/Pacific Islander; 1.19% (134 people) other; and 1.27% (143 people) of two or more races. Of any race, 3.91% (439 people) were Hispanic/Latino.

In the village, the population was spread out, with 13.11% (1,472 people) under the age of 18, 15.68% (1,761 people) ages 18 and 19, 26.5% (2,977 people) ages 20–24, 7.52% (844 people) ages 25–34, 11.96% (1,343 people) ages 35–49, 13.46% (1,511 people) ages 50–64, and 11.77% (1,322 people) over the age of 65. The male population made up 46.85% (5,261 people) of the total population and the female population made up 53.15% (5,969 people) of the total population.

=== 2000 census ===
Previously, in 2000 there were 10,706 people, 3,641 households, and 1,951 families residing in the village. The village's median household income was $34,712, while the median family income was $49,549.

== Notable people ==
- George Borrello, New York state senator
- Ozias Bowen, former Ohio Supreme Court judge
- Hiram C. Bull, politician
- Pete Correale, stand-up comedian, broadcaster and writer, previously lived in Fredonia
- Enoch A. Curtis, architect
- Alonzo Cushing, Civil War Union officer; died on Cemetery Ridge at the Battle of Gettysburg
- William Barker Cushing, U.S. naval officer during the Civil War
- Samuel T. Douglass, notable jurist
- Warren B. Hooker, former US congressman
- Douglass Houghton, explorer of Keweenaw Peninsula of Michigan
- Dave Fridmann, Grammy Award-winning record producer and director of the WNY Alumni Drum and Bugle Corps.
- Esther Lord McNeill, temperance movement leader
- James Mullett Jr. (1784–1858), lawyer, judge, and politician; moved to Fredonia in 1810, later died in Fredonia
- Olive Risley Seward, adopted daughter of William Henry Seward
- Jennifer Stuczynski, Olympic medalist in athletics
- Kevin Sylvester, sports radio talk show host
- Jean Webster, author
- Russell Willson, Vice Admiral, United States Navy
- Louis E. Woods, Lieutenant General, United States Marines

== Other mentions ==
In his book Houses from Books, Daniel D. Reiff subjects Fredonia's housing stock to a detailed analysis. Fredonia is used as a model for the influence of pattern books, catalogs and journals on the style of houses in the whole United States. Reiff chose Fredonia because he himself lived there and conducted a survey of the style of all 2,239 houses in 1984. Moreover, historically there were only a few losses of houses.
