= List of American aero squadrons =

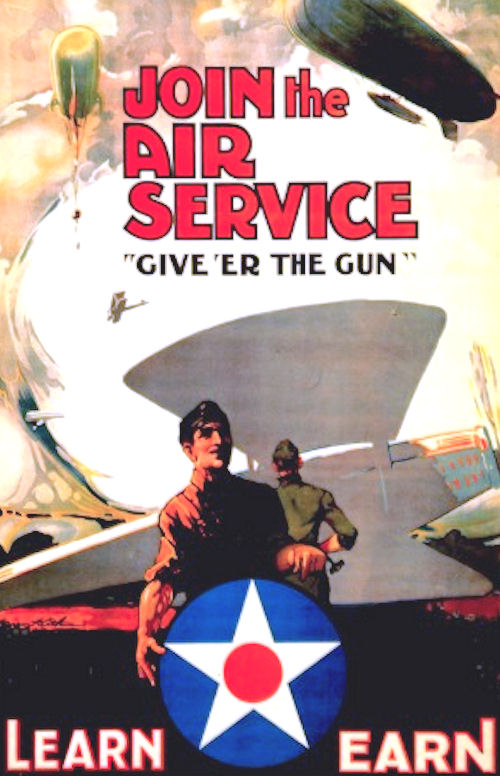
Air Service recruiting poster, 1918

Roundel of the Air Service, United States Army used on planes in the American Expeditionary Forces during World War I

This is a partial list of original Air Service, United States Army "Aero Squadrons" before and during World War I. Units formed after 1 January 1919 are not listed.

Aero Squadrons were the designation of the first United States Army aviation units until the end of World War I. These units consisted of combat flying, training, ground support, construction and other components of the Air Service. After World War I ended, the majority of these squadrons were demobilized. Some however were retained during the interwar period of the 1920s and 1930s, and served in all theaters of operation during World War II. Today, the oldest squadrons in the United States Air Force and Air National Guard can trace their lineage back to the original Aero Squadrons of World War I.

== Overview ==
In January 1918 a new numbering scheme for aero squadrons was set up. Numbers 1–399 would be for Aero Service Squadrons (AS). 400–599 Aero Construction Squadrons (ACS), 600–799 Aero Supply Squadrons and 800–1099 Aero Repair Squadrons. Non-notable support squadrons are not listed.

The numerical designation of school squadrons at the various flying fields in the United States was discontinued in July 1918, and replaced by letter designation. For example, the 2d Aero Squadron became Squadron A, Kelly Field. In November 1918, the personnel of the lettered squadrons of each flying field was merged into a single Flying School Detachment at such station.

Formed prior to 2 April 1917
American Expeditionary Force combat squadron
Planned American Expeditionary Force combat squadron (never entered combat)
Currently active as United States Air Force/Air National Guard squadron

In addition to the Aero Squadrons, whose mission supported airplanes in one way or another, Air Service Spruce Squadrons have been noted and listed. A part of the Signal Corps, they were located in Oregon and Washington states. When the U.S. entered World War I, it was quickly discovered that the nation had no capacity to build warplanes in quantity. Spruce timber, vital to wing construction was in critically short supply. In 1918 the United States Army stepped in and took over the production of airplane spruce in the pacific northwest, with the Spruce Production Division organizing loggers and constructing a plant to process the wood, construct roads and railroads into the forests to access and cut the timber.

Men in the Spruce Squadrons were part of the Signal Corps along with the Aero Squadrons, as the Signal Corps oversaw all Army aviation. About 50,000 soldiers were assigned to Spruce Squadrons, overseeing about 100,000 lumber workers, were assigned to small camps in the Pacific Northwest. Many of these men were itching to go "over there" and take part in combat, however, their labor and skills to produce spruce lumber were needed far more, in the forests of the Pacific Northwest to produce the materiel needed to build aircraft. The camps where the soldiers were located are listed on the individual squadron entry.

== Squadrons ==
=== 1st to 24th Aero Squadrons ===
At the time of the United States entry into World War I in April 1917, three Aero Squadrons had been formed. The 1st and 3d were in the United States, and the 2d was in the Philippines. The 6th, being destined for Hawaii and the 7th, destined for the Panama Canal Zone were organizing. The 4th and 5th, to be based in the continental United States had yet to receive personnel.

Aero Squadron	Established	World War I
Aero Squadron	Notes/Subsequent History	
1st Aero Squadron	5 March 1913	Formed as: 1st Provisional Aero Squadron; Pre-WWI service in Mexico and Texas; AEF: 6 April 1918 – 12 May 1919; Corps Observation Squadron; Combat with I Corps Observation Group: Patrols in the Toul, Aisne-Marne, Vesle and Toul-Verdun Sectors; St. Mihiel Offensive Campaign; Aisne-Marne Defensive Campaign; Meuse-Argonne Offensive Campaign
1st Aero Squadron	Most senior organization in the United States Air Force; Returned to the United States in August 1919, stationed at Park Field, Tennessee; Redesignated in the Army Air Service as the 1st Squadron (Observation) on 14 March 1921; Re-designated as the 1st Observation Squadron on 15 November 1922; Reorganized and re-designated 1st Bombardment Squadron on 1 March 1935.; Currently: 1st Reconnaissance Squadron, Beale AFB, California	
2d Aero Squadron	1 December 1915	Formed as: 1st Company, 2d Aero Squadron; Pre-WWI service in the Philippines; Instructional flying squadron Re-designated: Squadron A, Kelly Field, Texas, July 1918; Demobilized: 18 November 1918
2d Aero Squadron	Constituted in the Air Service, United States Army on 3 June 1919, at Rockwell Field, California, as the 2d Aero Squadron; Transferred on 24 December 1919, to the Philippines assigned to the Philippine Department.; Redesignated in the Army Air Service as the 2d Squadron (Observation) on 14 March 1921; Consolidated on 8 April 1924, with the 2d Aero Squadron; Re-designated as: 2d Observation Squadron on 25 January 1923; Stationed at Nichols Field, Philippines on 7 December 1941, subsequently wiped out in the 1941–1942 Battle of the Philippines; Inactivated 2 April 1946; Re-activated 1 January 1949.; Currently: 2d Air Refueling Squadron, McGuire AFB, New Jersey	
3d Aero Squadron	1 November 1916	Pre-WWI service in Texas; Instructional flying squadron Re-designated: Squadron A, Post Field, Oklahoma, July 1918; Demobilized: 2 January 1919
3d Aero Squadron	Constituted in the Air Service, United States Army on 13 May 1919, at Mitchel Field, New York, as the 3d Aero Squadron; Transferred on 5 July 1919, to the Philippines assigned to the Philippine Department.; Redesignated in the Army Air Service as the 3d Squadron (Pursuit) on 14 March 1921; Re-designated as the 3rd Pursuit Squadron on 25 January 1923 Consolidated on 8 April 1924, with the 3rd Aero Squadron; Stationed at Clark Field, Philippines on 7 December 1941, subsequently wiped out in the 1941–1942 Battle of the Philippines; Inactivated 2 April 1946.; Re-designated 3d Tactical Fighter Squadron on 12 March 1973; Activated on 15 March 1973.; Currently: 3d Flying Training Squadron, Vance AFB, Oklahoma	
4th Aero Squadron	5 May 1917	Planning for organization began in December 1916 when the United States Army made plans for a force of seven air squadrons Instructional flying squadron Re-designated: Squadron B, Post Field, Oklahoma, July 1918; Demobilized: 2 January 1919
4th Aero Squadron	Constituted in the Air Service, United States Army on 23 June 1919, at Hazelhurst Field, New York, as the 4th Aero Squadron; Transferred on 24 January 1920, to Luke Field, Hawaii assigned to the Hawaiian Department.; Redesignated in the Army Air Service as the 4th Squadron (Observation) on 14 March 1921; Re-designated as the 4th Observation Squadron on 25 January 1923; Consolidated on 8 April 1924, with the 4th Aero Squadron; Reorganized and re-designated 4th Reconnaissance Squadron (Medium Range) on 25 January 1938; Assigned to Hickam Field, Hawaii on 7 December 1941, largely destroyed during the Pearl Harbor Attack; Re-designated 394th Bombardment Squadron (Heavy) on 22 April 1942; Currently: 394th Combat Training Squadron, Whiteman AFB, Missouri	
5th Aero Squadron	5 May 1917	Planning for organization began in December 1916 when the United States Army made plans for a force of seven air squadrons Instructional flying squadron Re-designated: Squadron A, Souther Field, Georgia, July 1918; Demobilized: 11 November 1918
5th Aero Squadron	Constituted in the Air Service, United States Army on 23 June 1919, at Hazelhurst Field, New York, as the 5th Aero Squadron; Transferred in November 1919 to Mitchel Field, New York; Redesignated in the Army Air Service as the 5th Squadron (Observation) on 14 March 1921; Re-designated 5th Observation Squadron on 25 January 1923; Consolidated in April 1924 with the 5th Aero Squadron; Currently: 5th Reconnaissance Squadron, Beale AFB, California	
6th Aero Squadron	13 March 1917	Planning for organization began in December 1916 when the United States Army made plans for a force of seven air squadrons Garrisoned at: Luke Field, Ford Island, Hawaii
6th Aero Squadron	Redesignated in the Army Air Service as the 6th Squadron (Pursuit) on 14 March 1921; Re-designated as the 6th Pursuit Squadron on 25 January 1923; Re-designated: 6th Pursuit Squadron on 25 January 1923; Re-designated: 6th Night Fighter Squadron on 17 January 1943; Inactivated on 20 February 1947; Currently: 6th Weapons Squadron, Nellis AFB, Nevada	
7th Aero Squadron	29 March 1917	Planning for organization began in December 1916 when the United States Army made plans for a force of seven air squadrons Garrisoned in Panama Canal Zone
7th Aero Squadron	Redesignated in the Army Air Service as the 7th Squadron (Observation) on 14 March 1921; Re-designated: 7th Observation Squadron on 25 January 1925.; Re-designated: 397th Bombardment Squadron (Heavy) on 11 May 1942; Inactivated on 1 November 1946.; Currently: 7th Reconnaissance Squadron, NAS Sigonella, Italy	
8th Aero Squadron	21 June 1917	AEF: 8 December 1917 – 3 May 1919; Corps Observation Squadron; Combat with IV and VI Corps Observation Groups: Patrols in the Toul Sector; St. Mihiel Offensive Campaign
8th Aero Squadron	Returned to the United States in June 1919 and assigned to Kelly Field, Texas; Re-designated 8th Surveillance Squadron; Transferred on 13 August 1919, less Flight B, to the U. S. Army Airdrome, McAllen, Texas.; Redesignated in the Army Air Service as the 8th Squadron (Attack) on 14 March 1921; Entire squadron transferred 2 July 1921, to Kelly Field, Texas. Re-designated as the 8th Attack Squadron 25 March 1923; Reorganized and re-designated 8th Bombardment Squadron on 1 December 1939; Currently: 8th Special Operations Squadron, Hurlburt Field, Florida	
9th Aero Squadron	14 June 1917	AEF: 28 October 1917 – 8 June 1919; Night Observation Squadron; Combat with First Army Observation Group: Patrols in the Toul Sector; St. Mihiel Offensive Campaign; Meuse-Argonne Offensive Campaign
9th Aero Squadron	Returned to the United States in June 1919 and assigned to March Field, California; Redesignated in the Army Air Service as the 9th Squadron (Observation) on 14 March 1921; Inactivated on 29 June 1922, at March Field; Re-designated as the 9th Observation Squadron on 25 January 1923. Re-designated as the 9th Bombardment Squadron 24 March 1923; Organized by June 1929 in the Regular Army Reserve at Kelly Field, Texas. Activated on 1 April 1931, less Reserve personnel. Re-designated as the 9th Bombardment Squadron (Heavy) on 6 December 1939.; Currently: 9th Bomb Squadron, Dyess AFB, Texas	
10th Aero Squadron	31 May 1917	Organized at Kelly Field, Texas; Transferred to Chanute Field, Illinois, 7 July 1917 (First assigned unit to Chanute Field); AEF: 26 December 1917 – May 1919; Service Support Squadron; 3d Aviation Instruction Center; Issoudun Aerodrome erroneously demobilized: Jun 1919 at Mitchell Field, New York; re-constituted at Bolling Field, D.C., Jul 1919; final demobilization 31 December 1919.
11th Aero Squadron	26 June 1917	AEF: 1 January 1918 – 1 May 1919; Day Bombardment Squadron; Combat with 1st Day Bombardment Group: Patrols in the Toul Sector; St. Mihiel Offensive Campaign; Meuse-Argonne Offensive Campaign
11th Aero Squadron	Returned to the United States in June 1919, assigned to Fort Bliss, Texas; Participated in the Mexican Border Patrol August–November 1919; Constituted in the Army Air Service as the 11th Squadron (Observation) on 14 March 1921; Re-designated as the 11th Bombardment Squadron on 25 January 1923; Conducted bombing tests on obsolete warships off Chesapeake Bay 5 September 1923; Transferred on 5 December 1934, to Hamilton Field, California. Transferred on 2 September 1940, to Fort Douglas, Utah. Transferred on 18 January 1941, to Salt Lake City, Utah.; Ground elements departed from Salt Lake City 13 November 1941, and sailed from the port of San Francisco on 21 November on an army transport en route to the Philippines. Aircraft and crews began departing Muroc Field, California, on 6 December en route to Hawaii. Elements of the squadron flew their B-17s into Hickam Field at the height of the Japanese attack on Pearl Harbor 7 December 1941; fought in the Pacific Theater during World War II; Inactivated on 2 November 1945.; Consolidated (11 January 1982) with 11th Pilotless Bomber Squadron, Light, which was constituted on 17 June 1954; Activated on 1 September 1954; Re-designated 11th Tactical Missile Squadron on 8 June 1955; Re-designated 11th Bomb Squadron on 24 June 1994, Currently: 11th Bomb Squadron, Barksdale AFB, Louisiana	
12th Aero Squadron	2 June 1917	AEF: 16 January 1918 – 17 June 1919; Corps Observation Squadron; Combat with I Corps Observation Group: Patrols in the Toul, Baccarat (Luneville), Aisne-Marne, and Vesle Sectors; Aisne-Marne Offensive Campaign; St. Mihiel Offensive Campaign; Meuse-Argonne Offensive Campaign
12th Aero Squadron	Returned to the United States in June 1919, assigned to Scott Field, Illinois; Transferred on 13 October 1919, to Kelly Field, Texas, then on 9 January 1920, to Biggs Field, Texas. Participated in the Mexican Border Patrol January 1920 – May 1921 and Forest Fire Patrol May–August 1921; Constituted in the Army Air Service as the 12th Squadron (Observation) on 14 March 1921; Re-designated 12th Observation Squadron on 25 January 1923; Flew reconnaissance missions in April 1929 for the 10th Cavalry in the vicinity of Nogales, New Mexico, during the Escobar-Topete Revolution.; Currently: 12th Reconnaissance Squadron, Beale AFB, California	
13th Aero Squadron	14 June 1917	AEF: 26 December 1917 – 13 March 1919; Pursuit Squadron; Combat with 2d Pursuit Group: Patrols in the Toul and Verdun Sectors; St. Mihiel Offensive Campaign; Meuse-Argonne Offensive Campaign; Demobilized on 29 March 1919
13th Aero Squadron	Constituted in the Regular Army on 3 June 1919, at Rockwell Field, California, as the 104th Aero Squadron; Transferred on 6 July 1919, to Scott Field, Illinois. Transferred on 6 November 1919, less one flight, to Biggs Field, Texas. One flight operated from Camp Marfa, Texas, until 3 September 1920. Another flight operated from Post Field, Oklahoma.; Constituted in the Army Air Service as the 13th Squadron (Attack) on 14 March 1921; Re-designated as the 13th Attack Squadron on 25 January 1923. Inactivated on 27 June 1924, at Kelly Field; Organized in June 1924 in the Regular Army Reserve at Kelly Field, Texas. Conducted summer training at Fort Crockett, Texas; Activated on 1 November 1929, less Reserve personnel, at Barksdale Field, Louisiana; Consolidated with 13th Aero Squadron, 16 October 1936, Currently: 13th Bomb Squadron, Whiteman AFB, Missouri	
14th Aero Squadron	9 May 1917	Organized from: Aviation Company "A", Rockwell Field, California; Re-designated: 1st Aviation School Squadron, August 1917; Re-designated: 14th Aero Squadron, August 1917; Instructional flying squadron Re-designated: Squadron A, Rockwell Field, California, July 1918; Demobilized: 23 November 1918
14th Aero Squadron	Constituted in the Army Air Corps on 1 April 1928, at Bolling Field, District of Columbia, as Air Corps Detachment, Bolling Field, and assigned to the Office of Chief of the Air Corps; re-designated 1 March 1935, as the 14th Bombardment Squadron; Consolidated on 8 June 1935, with the 14th Aero Squadron; Inactivated on 1 September 1936, at Bolling Field Organized by December 1937 in the Regular Army Reserve; Conducted summer training at Kelly Field, Texas; Activated on 1 February 1940, less Reserve personnel, at Hickam Field, TH; Re-designated as the 14th Bombardment Squadron (Heavy) on 20 November 1940. Transferred by flying to Clark Field, Philippines on 16 September 1941; Transferred on 6 December 1941, to Del Monte Field, Philippines; Squadron was mostly wiped out in the 1941–1942 Battle of the Philippines, surviving personnel and aircraft transferred to Australia in December 1941, later reassigned to other units; Inactivated on 2 April 1946; disbanded on 19 August 1949; never again activated.	
15th Aero Squadron	9 May 1917	Organized from: Aviation Company "B", Mineola, New York; Re-designated: 2d Aviation School Squadron; Re-designated: 15th Aero Squadron, August 1917; Training Squadron: Hazelhurst Field, New York; Demobilized: 18 September 1919
15th Aero Squadron	Constituted in the Army Air Service as the 15th Squadron (Observation) on 14 March 1921; Re-designated as the 15th Observation Squadron on 25 January 1923; Consolidated in 1924 with the 15th Aero Squadron; Inactivated on 1 August 1927; Activated on 15 May 1928; Re-designated: 15th Observation Squadron (Medium) on 13 January 1942; Currently: 15th Reconnaissance Squadron, Creech AFB, Nevada	
16th Aero Squadron	9 May 1917	Organized from: Aviation Company "C", Memphis, Tennessee; Re-designated: 3d Aviation School Squadron; Re-designated 16th Aero Squadron, August 1917; AEF: 8 January 1918 – 7 May 1919; Construction Squadron; Demobilized: 22 May 1919
16th Aero Squadron	Constituted in the Army Air Service as the 16th Squadron (Observation) on 14 March 1921; Re-designated as the 16th Observation Squadron on 25 January 1923; Consolidated on 8 April 1924, with the 16th Aero Squadron; Re-designated 16th Reconnaissance Squadron (Bomber) on 31 May 1943; Reconstituted on 19 September 1985, and consolidated with 16th Photographic Reconnaissance Squadron as 16th Tactical Electronic Warfare Squadron Currently: 16th Electronic Warfare Squadron, Eglin AFB, Florida	
17th Aero Squadron	16 June 1917	AEF: 4 August 1917 – 20 March 1919; Pursuit Squadron (Primarily assigned to Royal Air Force): Patrols in the St. Quentin-Arras, Amiens-Arras, and Nieuport-Ypres Sector (Belgium); Somme Defensive Campaign; Somme Offensive Campaign; Demobilized: 1 April 1919
17th Aero Squadron	The 147th Aero Squadron returned from AEF to Selfridge Field, Michigan in June 1919; Constituted in the Army Air Service as the 17th Squadron (Pursuit) on 14 March 1921; Re-designated as the 17th Pursuit Squadron on 25 January 1923; Reconstituted, and consolidated (17 October 1936) with 17th Aero Squadron; Departed from the port of San Francisco, California, about mid-November 1940 on the U.S.A.T. Etolin and arrived in the Philippines; Transferred on 5 December 1940, to Nichols Field, Philippines; Squadron was wiped out in the 1941–1942 Battle of the Philippines, survivors reached Australia in March 1942 and were reassigned to other units, Inactivated on 2 April 1946; Activated and organized on 1 December 1971, as 17th Wild Weasel Squadron Currently: 17th Weapons Squadron, Nellis AFB, Nevada	
18th Aero Squadron	August 1917	Instructional flying squadron Re-designated: Squadron B, Rockwell Field, California, July 1918; Demobilized: November 1918
18th Aero Squadron	Constituted in the Army Air Service as the 18th Observation Squadron on 10 June 1922; Consolidated on 17 March 1925, with the 18th Aero Squadron; Reorganized and re-designated 40th Attack Squadron on 1 March 1935; consolidated unit re-designated as the 18th Headquarters Squadron, Bolling Field, District of Columbia.; Reconstituted and consolidated (1964) with 18th Observation Squadron (Long Range, Light Bombardment) which was constituted on 1 March 1935; Re-designated: 408th Bombardment Squadron (Medium) on 22 April 1942; Inactivated on 29 April 1946; Re-designated 408th Bombardment Squadron (Medium) on 6 October 1958; Discontinued, and inactivated, on 1 January 1962.	
19th Aero Squadron	14 June 1917	Formed as 14th Aero Squadron; AEF: 1 January 1918 – 5 April 1919; Assigned to Seventh Aviation Instruction Center; Demobilized: 14 April 1919
19th Aero Squadron	Constituted in the Army Air Service as the 19th Squadron (Pursuit) on 30 August 1921; Inactivated on 29 June 1922; Re-designated 19th Pursuit Squadron on 25 January 1923, and activated 1 May 1923; Re-designated: 19th Fighter Squadron on 15 May 1942, Currently 19th Fighter Squadron, Hickam Field, Hawaii	
20th Aero Squadron	26 June 1917	AEF: 31 December 1917– 2 May 1919; Day Bombardment Squadron; Combat with 1st Day Bombardment Group: Patrols in the Toul Sector; St. Mihiel Offensive Campaign; Meuse-Argonne Offensive Campaign
20th Aero Squadron	Returned to the United States in June 1919, assigned to Ellington Field, Texas; Constituted in the Army Air Service as the 20th Squadron (Bombardment) on 30 August 1921; Re-designated as the 20th Bombardment Squadron on 25 January 1923. Conducted bombing tests on obsolete warships off Chesapeake Bay 5 September 1923; Currently: 20th Bomb Squadron, Barksdale AFB, Louisiana	
21st Aero Squadron	13 June 1917	Organized from: Aviation Company "C", Chicago, May 1917; Re-designated: 4th Aviation School Squadron, May 1917; Re-organized as 16th Aero Squadron (II) in May 1917; Re-designated: 21st Aero Squadron, June 1917 at Scott Field, Illinois; AEF: 23 January 1918 – 6 April 1919; AEF: Flying School Squadron, Third Air Instructional Center, Issoudun Aerodrome, France; Demobilized: 14 April 1919
21st Aero Squadron	Constituted in the Army Air Service as the 21st Observation Squadron on 24 March 1923, consolidated with 21st Aero Squadron, same date; Demobilized on 1 October 1933. Reconstituted and consolidated with the 21st Observation Squadron on 2 December 1936; The 21st Observation Squadron was constituted in the Army Air Forces on 1 March 1935; Re-designated: 411th Bombardment Squadron (Heavy) on 22 April 1942;Inactivated on 15 April 1946; Consolidated (19 September 1985) with 911th Air Refueling Squadron, Heavy, which was constituted on 28 May 1958, Currently: 911th Air Refueling Squadron, MacDill AFB, Florida	
22d Aero Squadron	20 June 1917	AEF: 16 February 1918 – 15 June 1919; Pursuit Squadron; Combat with 2d Pursuit Group: Patrols in the Amiens and Toul Sectors; Somme Defensive Campaign; St. Mihiel Offensive Campaign; Meuse-Argonne Offensive Campaign; Demobilized: 17 June 1919
22d Aero Squadron	The 135th Aero Squadron returned from AEF to Post Field, Oklahoma in June 1919; Constituted in the Army Air Service as the 22d Squadron (Observation) on 14 March 1921; Re-designated as the 22nd Observation Squadron on 25 January 1923; Consolidated on 17 April 1937, with the 22d Aero Squadron; Currently: 22d Intelligence Squadron, Fort George G. Meade, Maryland	
23d Aero Squadron	23 June 1917	Formed as 18th Aero Squadron; AEF: 25 July 1918 – 8 March 1919; Primarily trained in England as an aircraft maintenance squadron, did not see combat. Demobilized: 22 March 1919
23d Aero Squadron	Constituted in the Army Air Service as the 22d Squadron (Observation) on 14 March 1921; re-designated 23d Bombardment Squadron on 25 January 1923, Consolidated on 8 April 1924, with the 23d Aero Squadron; Currently 23d Bomb Squadron, Minot AFB, North Dakota	
24th Aero Squadron	1 May 1917	AEF: 24 January 1918 – 2 August 1919; Army Observation Squadron; Combat with First Army Observation Group; Demobilized: 1 October 1919: St. Mihiel Offensive Campaign; Meuse-Argonne Offensive Campaign; Demobilized on 1 October 1919
24th Aero Squadron	Constituted in the Army Air Service as the 24th Squadron (Pursuit) on 14 March 1921; Re-designated as the 24th Pursuit Squadron on 25 January 1923; Consolidated on 8 April 1924, with the 24th Aero Squadron; Served in Panama Canal Zone. Inactivated on 15 October 1946	

=== 25th to 49th Aero Squadrons ===
Aero Squadron	Established	World War I
Aero Squadron	Notes/Subsequent History	
25th Aero Squadron	13 June 1917	AEF: 24 January 1918 – 6 June 1919; Pursuit Squadron; Combat with 4th Pursuit Group: Meuse-Argonne Offensive Campaign; Demobilized: 17 June 1919
25th Aero Squadron	Constituted in the Army Air Service as the 25th Squadron (Bombardment) on 14 March 1921; Assigned to the Panama Canal Department; Re-designated as the 25th Bombardment Squadron on 25 January 1923; Consolidated (1924) with 25th Aero Squadron.; Currently: 25th Space Range Squadron, Schriever AFB, Colorado	
26th Aero Squadron	26 May 1917	Formed as: 1st Reserve Aero Squadron; Re-designated: 26th Aero Squadron, September 1917; AEF 17 September 1917 – 27 May 1919; Instructional Squadron, 3d Air Instructional Center, Issoudun Aerodrome; Demobilized, 7 June 1919
26th Aero Squadron	Constituted in the Army Air Service as the 26th Squadron (Attack) on 14 March 1921; Re-designated as the 26th Attack Squadron on 25 January 1923; Consolidated on 8 April 1924, with the 26th Aero Squadron; Re-designated: 26th Bombardment Squadron on 6 December 1939; Inactivated on 20 October 1948 Re-designated 26th Tactical Fighter Squadron on 24 September 1973; Activated on 30 September 1973, Currently: 26th Space Aggressor Squadron (USAFR), Schriever AFB, Colorado	
27th Aero Squadron	8 May 1917	AEF: 5 March 1918–19 Mar 1919; Pursuit Squadron; Combat with 1st Pursuit Group: Patrols in the Toul, Aisne-Marne, Vesle and Verdun Sectors; Champagne-Marne Defensive Campaign; Aisne-Marne Offensive Campaign; St. Mihiel Offensive Campaign; Meuse-Argonne Offensive Campaign; Medal of Honor recipient: Lt Frank Luke
27th Aero Squadron	Returned to the United States in June 1919, assigned to Selfridge Field, Michigan; Constituted in the Army Air Service as the 27th Squadron (Pursuit) on 14 March 1921; Re-designated as the 27th Pursuit Squadron on 25 January 1923; Re-designated: 27th Fighter Squadron on 15 May 1942, Currently: 27th Fighter Squadron, Langley AFB, Virginia	
28th Aero Squadron	22 June 1917	AEF: 5 March 1918 – 31 May 1919; Pursuit Squadron; Attached to the Royal Flying Corps (Aug 1917 – Jun 1918); Combat with 3d Pursuit Group: Patrols in the Ypres Sector (Belgium) and Toul Sectors; Somme Defensive Campaign; Lys Defensive Campaign; Champagne-Marne Defensive Campaign; Aisne-Marne Offensive Campaign; St. Mihiel Offensive Campaign; Meuse-Argonne Offensive Campaign; Demobilized: 16 June 1919
28th Aero Squadron	Constituted in the Army Air Service as the 28th Squadron (Bombardment) on 14 March 1921; Consolidated on 9 January 1922, with the 28th Aero Squadron; Inactivated on 28 June 1922, at Mather Field.; Activated on 1 September 1922, at Clark Field, PI, and assigned to the Philippine Department; Squadron suffered severe losses in the 1941–1942 Battle of the Philippines, withdrawn to Australia, December 1941. Fought in Pacific Theater, Inactivated on 1 October 19834 Re-activated 1 July 1987, Currently: 28th Bomb Squadron, Dyess AFB, Texas	
29th Aero Squadron	March 1918	Instructional flying squadron Re-designated: Squadron A, Brooks Field, Texas, July 1918; Demobilized: November 1918
29th Aero Squadron	Constituted in the Army Air Service as the 29th Pursuit Squadron on 23 March 1924; Consolidated in 1935 with the 29th Aero Squadron; Re-designated 29th Fighter-Interceptor Squadron on 23 March 1953, Currently 29th Training Systems Squadron, Eglin AFB, Florida	
30th Aero Squadron	13 June 1917	AEF 19 September 1917 – 5 April 1919; Instructional Squadron, 3d Air Instructional Center, Issoudun Aerodrome; Demobilized, 7 June 1919
30th Aero Squadron	Re-constituted in the Army Air Service as the 30th Bombardment Squadron on 25 January 1923; Transferred on 25 October 1935, to March Field, California. Re-designated as the 30th Bombardment Squadron (Heavy) on 6 December 1939. Transferred on 1 June 1941, to Albuquerque, New Mexico.; Departed from the port of San Francisco on 4 October 1941, on the U.S.A.T. Willard A. Holbrook and arrived at Manila, PI, on 23 October 1941. Transferred to Clark Field, PI, the same day. Squadron suffered severe losses in the 1941–1942 Battle of the Philippines, was withdrawn to Australia in December 1941. Returned to combat in Pacific Theater in 1944, remained in Far East Air Force after World War II ended, engaged in strategic bombardment of North Korea, 1950–1953; inactivated 1 February 1963.; Consolidated 19 September 1985, with United States Air Force Thunderbirds, Nellis AFB, Nevada	
31st Aero Squadron	13 June 1917	AEF: 16 September 1917 – 5 April 1919; Instructional Squadron, 3d Air Instructional Center, Issoudun Aerodrome; Demobilized, 14 April 1919
31st Aero Squadron	Re-constituted in the Army Air Service as the 31st Bombardment Squadron on 24 March 1923; Transferred on 5 December 1934, to Hamilton Field, California.; Departed from the port of San Francisco on the U.S.A.T. Republic on 1 February 1938, to reinforce the Hawaiian Department. Arrived at Honolulu, TH, on 8 February 1938, and transferred to Hickam Field, TH, the same day; Squadron suffered severe losses in the Pearl Harbor Attack, was re-equipped and returned to combat in the Pacific Theater in 1942, remained in Far East Air Force after World War II ended, redesignated the 31st Strategic Reconnaissance Squadron 16 September 1947, engaged in combat reconnaissance missions over North Korea, Jun – Nov 1950; transferred to Travis AFB, CA 15 November 1950; redesignated 31st Bombardment Squadron (Heavy) on 1 October 1955; transferred to Beale AFB, CA on 18 January 1960, inactivated 1 February 1963; Reactivated 1 July 1986, Currently: 31st Test and Evaluation Squadron, Edwards AFB, California	
32d Aero Squadron	13 June 1917	AEF: 20 September 1917 – 5 April 1919; Aircraft Repair Squadron, 3d Air Instructional Center, Issoudun Aerodrome; Demobilized, 5 April 1919
32d Aero Squadron	Re-constituted in the Army Air Service as the 32nd Bombardment Squadron on 24 March 1923; Deployed to European Theater of Operations (ETO) in August 1942; Discontinued, and inactivated, on 8 June 1964; Re-activated as 32d Air Refueling Squadron on 23 December 1964, Currently: 32d Air Refueling Squadron, McGuire AFB, New Jersey	
33d Aero Squadron	12 June 1917	AEF: 16 September 1917 – 5 April 1919; Aircraft Repair Squadron, 3d Air Instructional Center, Issoudun Aerodrome; Demobilized, 5 April 1919
33d Aero Squadron	Re-constituted in the Army Air Service as the 33d Pursuit Squadron on 24 March 1923; World War II service as part of the Iceland Base Command (IBC), Inactivated on 22 June 1945; Re-designated as 33d Fighter-Bomber Squadron on 3 March 1953, and re-activated Currently: 33d Special Operations Squadron, Cannon AFB, New Mexico	
34th Aero Squadron	10 May 1917	Formed as: 2d Company "H", Camp Kelly, Texas; AEF: 19 September 1917 – 27 May 1919; Instructional Squadron, 2d Air Instructional Center, Tours Aerodrome; Demobilized, 10 April 1919
34th Aero Squadron	Re-constituted in the Army Air Service as the 34th Pursuit Squadron on 24 March 1923; Reorganized and re-designated as the 34th Attack Squadron on 1 March 1935; Reorganized and re-designated as the 34th Bombardment Squadron on 17 October 1939; World War II service in the Mediterranean Theater of Operations (MTO); Currently: 34th Bomb Squadron, Ellsworth AFB, South Dakota	
35th Aero Squadron	12 June 1917	AEF: 20 September 1917 – 9 March 1919; Aircraft Repair Squadron, 3d Air Instructional Center, Issoudun Aerodrome; Demobilized, 19 March 1919
35th Aero Squadron	Re-constituted in the Army Air Service as the 35th Pursuit Squadron on 24 March 1923; Re-designated: 35th Fighter Squadron on 15 May 1942; fought in Pacific Theater during World War II; Korean War 1950–1953; Currently 35th Fighter Squadron, Kunsan AB, South Korea	
36th Aero Squadron	12 June 1917	AEF: 19 September 1917 – 25 March 1919; Aircraft Repair Squadron, 3d Air Instructional Center, Issoudun Aerodrome; Demobilized, 7 April 1919
36th Aero Squadron	Re-constituted in the Army Air Service as the 36th Pursuit Squadron on 24 March 1923; Re-designated: 36th Fighter Squadron on 15 May 1942; fought in Pacific Theater during World War II; Korean War 1950–1953; Currently 36th Fighter Squadron, Osan AB, South Korea.	
37th Aero Squadron	13 June 1917	AEF: 18 September 1917 – 5 April 1919; Aircraft Repair Squadron, 3d Air Instructional Center, Issoudun Aerodrome; Demobilized, 7 April 1919
37th Aero Squadron	Re-constituted in the Army Air Service as the 37th Pursuit Squadron on 24 March 1923; Re-designated as the 37th Bombardment Squadron on 1 December 1939; Deployed to European Theater of Operations (ETO) during World War II Currently 37th Bomb Squadron, Ellsworth AFB, South Dakota	
38th Aero Squadron	August 1917	Instructional flying squadron Re-designated: Squadron A, Chanute Field, Illinois, July 1918; Demobilized: November 1918
38th Aero Squadron	Constituted in the Army Air Service as the 37th Pursuit Squadron on 24 March 1923; Activated on 1 August 1933, at Selfridge Field, Michigan; Consolidated in 1933 with the 38th Aero Squadron, Reorganized and re-designated 38th Observation Squadron; Aircraft and crews began departing Hamilton Field, California, on 6 December en route to Hawaii. Elements of the squadron flew their B-17s into Hickam Field at the height of the Japanese attack on Pearl Harbor, suffered severe damage and was returned to the United States. Re-designated: 427th Bombardment Squadron (Heavy) on 22 April 1942; Deployed to European Theater of Operations (ETO), 12 September 1942; Discontinued, and inactivated, on 1 January 1962.; Re-activated as 427th Reconnaissance Squadron, 1 May 2012, assigned to Beale AFB, California	
39th Aero Squadron	December 1917	Instructional flying squadron Re-designated: Squadron A, Rich Field, Texas, July 1918; Demobilized: November 1918
39th Aero Squadron	Constituted in the Army Air Service as the 39th School Squadron on 24 March 1923; Activated on 1 August 1927, at Kelly Field, Texas and attached to the Air Corps Advanced Flying School. Consolidated in 1933 with the 39th Aero Squadron; Inactivated on 1 September 1936; Reactivated on 1 February 1940, at France Field, CZ, and assigned to the Panama Canal Department; Returned to the United States 15 March 1944, re-designated: 101st Photographic Reconnaissance Squadron; inactivated 25 December 1945.	
40th Aero Squadron	July 1917	Instructional flying squadron Re-designated: Squadron A, Selfridge Field, Michigan, July 1918; Demobilized: November 1918
40th Aero Squadron	Constituted in the Army Air Service as the 40th Squadron (School) on 10 June 1922; Re-designated as the 40th School Squadron on 25 January 1923. Consolidated on 8 April 1924, with the 40th Aero Squadron; Reorganized and re-designated 40th Attack Squadron on 1 March 1935, and attached to the Air Corps Advanced Flying School. Relieved from the Air Corps Advanced Flying School 1 September 1936, assigned to the General Headquarters Air Force, and inactivated at Kelly Field, Texas; disbanded on 1 July 1940.	
41st Aero Squadron	9 July 1917	AEF: 4 March 1918 – 28 June 1919; Pursuit Squadron; 5th Pursuit Group (Did not see combat); Demobilized: 2 July 1919
41st Aero Squadron	Constituted in the Army Air Service as the 41st Squadron (School) on 10 June 1922; Organized on 7 July 1922, at Kelly Field, Texas. Re-designated as the 41st School Squadron on 25 January 1923. Consolidated on 8 April 1924, with the 41st Aero Squadron; Reorganized and re-designated 1 March 1935, as the 41st Observation Squadron (Long Range, Amphibian), assigned to the 2nd Wing, and attached to the Air Corps Advanced Flying School. Re-designated as the 41st Reconnaissance Squadron on 1 September 1936; Inactivated at Kelly Field, Texas and re-organized on 20 January 1937, as a Regular Army Reserve unit at Love Field, Dallas, Texas; Activated on 1 February 1940, at Langley Field, Virginia; deploying in early 1943 to Twelfth Air Force in North Africa. Engaged in long-range strategic bombing missions in the Mediterranean Theater of Operations (MTO) 1943–1945; Inactivated on 28 February 1946. Reactivated as SAC B-47 Squadron on 11 August 1958; Currently: 429th Attack Squadron,	
42d Aero Squadron	July 1917	Instructional flying squadron Re-designated: Squadron I, Wilbur Wright Field, Ohio, July 1918; Demobilized: November 1918
42d Aero Squadron	Constituted in the Army Air Service as the 42d School Squadron on 10 June 1922 Consolidated on 8 April 1924, with the 42d Aero Squadron Reorganized and re-designated 42d Bombardment Squadron on 1 March 1935 Inactivated on 1 February 1963, as the 42d Bombardment Squadron (Heavy) at Wright-Patterson AFB, Ohio; Re-designated and activated as 42d Attack Squadron, 9 November 2006, Creech AFB, Nevada.	
43d Aero Squadron	13 June 1917	AEF: 25 October 1918 – 17 April 1919; Instructional Squadron; Demobilized: 17 April 1919
43d Aero Squadron	Constituted in the Army Air Service as the 43d Squadron (School) on 10 June 1922; Organized on 7 July 1922, at Kelly Field, Texas. Re-designated as the 43rd School Squadron on 25 January 1923. Consolidated on 8 April 1924, with the 43rd Aero Squadron; Inactivated on 1 September 1936, at Kelly Field, Texas.; Consolidated (1939) with the 43d Pursuit Squadron (Interceptor) which was constituted on 22 December 1939; Re-designated: 43d Fighter Squadron on 15 May 1942, Currently: 43d Fighter Squadron, Tyndall AFB, Florida	
44th Aero Squadron	July 1917	Instructional flying squadron Re-designated: Squadron K (later P), Wilbur Wright Field, Ohio. July 1918; Demobilized: November 1918
44th Aero Squadron	Constituted in the Army Air Service as the 44th Squadron (Observation) on 10 June 1922; Organized on 26 June 1922, at Post Field, Oklahoma; Re-designated as the 44th Observation Squadron on 25 January 1923. Consolidated on 8 April 1924, with the 44th Aero Squadron; Inactivated on 31 July 1927 Activated on 1 April 1931, at France Field, CZ; Re-designated: 430th Bombardment Squadron, 22 April 1942; Returned to the United States 31 October 1942; Re-designated: 430th Bombardment Squadron (Very Heavy) on 28 March 1944, saw combat in Pacific Theater; Inactivated on 14 April 1946; Currently: 44th Reconnaissance Squadron, Creech AFB, NV	
45th Aero Squadron	July 1917	Organized as: 2d Reserve Aero Squadron, Chandler Field, Pennsylvania; Re-designated: 45th Aero Squadron, July 1917; Transferred to Gerstner Field, Louisiana, November 1917; Instructional flying squadron Re-designated: Squadron A, Gerstner Field, Louisiana, July 1918; Demobilized: November 1918
46th Aero Squadron	April 1918	Stationed at Ellington Field, Texas; Hazelhurst Field, New York; Roosevelt Field, New York; Demobilized: January 1919
46th Aero Squadron	Constituted in the Army Air Service as the 46th School Squadron on 10 June 1922 Consolidated on 8 April 1924, with the 46th Aero Squadron;stationed Brooks Field, TX, 1922–31. Relieved from the 11th School Group on 31 December 1931, Assigned to the Air Corps Primary Flying School, Randolph Field, Texas, 31 December 1931. [Existed Randolph Field, TX, 12 Oct 1931–1941]	
47th Aero Squadron	20 July 1917	AEF: 19 March 1918 – July 1919; Service Squadron; Demobilized: July 1919
47th Aero Squadron	Constituted in the Army Air Service as the 47th School Squadron on 10 June 1922; Consolidated on 8 April 1924, with the 47th Aero Squadron; disbanded on 20 April 1944.	
48th Aero Squadron	4 August 1917	AEF: 4 November 1917 – 29 July 1919; Airfield Construction Squadron, various stations in France; Demobilized, 7 April 1919
48th Aero Squadron	Constituted in the Army Air Service as the 48th School Squadron on 10 June 1922 Consolidated on 8 April 1924, with the 48th Aero Squadron; Inactivated on 1 September 1931. Re-designated 48th Pursuit Squadron on 1 March 1935; Re-designated 48th Fighter Squadron on 15 May 1942; Re-designated 48th Fighter-Interceptor Squadron on 11 September 1952, Currently: 48th Flying Training Squadron, Columbus AFB, Mississippi	
49th Aero Squadron	6 August 1917	AEF: 24 January 1918 – March 1919; Pursuit Squadron; Combat with 2d Pursuit Group: St. Mihiel Offensive Campaign; Meuse-Argonne Offensive Campaign; Demobilized on 22 March 1919
49th Aero Squadron	Constituted in the Army Air Service as the 49th Squadron (Bombardment) on 14 March 1921; Re-designated as the 49th Squadron (Bombardment) on 14 March 1921. Attached to the 1st Provisional Air Brigade 6 May – 3 October 1921, while supporting the battleship bombing tests off the Virginia coast. Transferred on 30 June 1922, to Langley Field, Virginia. Transferred on 10 August 1922, to Phillips Field, Maryland. Attached to the Ordnance Department at Aberdeen Proving Ground to conduct tests with newly developed aerial bombs August 1922 – January 1928. Re-designated as the 49th Bombardment Squadron on 25 January 1923; Consolidated on 16 October 1936, with the 49th Aero Squadron; Unit B-17s located the Italian luxury liner S.S. Rex about 725 miles out to sea on the famous long range interception mission conducted on 12 May 1938; During World War II, deployed to the Mediterranean Theater of Operations (MTO); Inactivated on 1 April 1963; Reactivated as 49th Test Squadron on 1 July 1986, Currently: 49th Test and Evaluation Squadron, Barksdale AFB, Louisiana	

=== 50th to 74th Aero Squadrons ===
Aero Squadron	Established	World War I
Aero Squadron	Notes/Subsequent History	
50th Aero Squadron	6 August 1917	AEF: 24 January 1918 – 1 May 1919; Corps Observation Squadron; Combat with I Corps Observation Group: Patrols in the Toul-Verdun Sector; St. Mihiel Offensive Campaign; Meuse-Argonne Offensive Campaign; Medal of Honor Winners: Erwin R. Bleckley; Harold E. Goettler; Lost Battalion (World War I)
50th Aero Squadron	Constituted in the Army Air Service as the 50th Squadron (Observation) on 14 March 1921; Attached to the 1st Provisional Air Brigade 6 May – 3 October 1921, while supporting the battleship bombing tests off the Virginia coast; Inactivated on 1 August 1927; Activated on 1 November 1930, less Reserve personnel, at Luke Field, Hawaii; Re-designated as the 50th Reconnaissance Squadron; Re-designated 431st Bombardment Squadron (Heavy) on 22 April 1942; Inactivated on 20 October 1947; Re-designated 50th Airmanship Training Squadron and activated on 1 October 1983; Currently: 50th Education Squadron, United States Air Force Academy, Colorado Inactivated on 1 August 2005.	
51st Aero Squadron	August 1917	Organized as a construction squadron at Kelly Field, Texas; Transferred to Ellington Field, Texas, Apr 1918; Transferred to Henry J. Damm Field, New York, Nov 1918 Demobilized: Garden City, New Jersey, January 1919
52d Aero Squadron	August 1917	Organized as a Construction Squadron at Kelly Field, Texas; Re-designated 464th Aero Squadron (Construction and repair), February 1918; AEF: February 1918 – January 1919; Demobilized: February 1919
52d Aero Squadron	Constituted in the Army Air Service as the 53d School Squadron, and assigned to the 14th School Group, Brooks Field, Texas on 6 February 1923; Consolidated on 14 October 1936, with the 52d Aero Squadron.; Subsequent history and lineage undetermined.	
53d Aero Squadron	August 1917	Organized as a Construction Squadron at Kelly Field, Texas; Re-designated 465th Aero Squadron (Construction and repair), February 1918; AEF: February 1918 – January 1919; Demobilized: February 1919
53d Aero Squadron	Constituted in the Army Air Service as the 53d School Squadron, and assigned to the 15th School Group, March Field, California on 6 February 1923; Consolidated on 14 October 1936, with the 53d Aero Squadron; disbanded on 20 April 1944.	
54th Aero Squadron	August 1917	Organized as a Construction Squadron at Kelly Field, Texas; Re-designated 466th Aero Squadron (Construction), February 1918; AEF: February 1918 – January 1919; Demobilized: February 1919
54th Aero Squadron	Constituted in the Army Air Service as the 54th School Squadron, and assigned to the 15th School Group, March Field, California on 6 February 1923; Re-designated as the 58th Service Squadron on 16 January 1923; Reorganized and re-designated 54th Bombardment Squadron on 1 March 1935, assigned to the 2d Bombardment Group, and attached to the Air Corps Tactical School, Maxwell Field, Alabama. Consolidated on 14 October 1936, with the 54th Aero Squadron; disbanded on 1 May 1942.	
55th Aero Squadron	25 August 1917	Re-designated: 467th Aero Squadron (Construction), February 1918; AEF: 4 November 1917 – 4 March 1918; Demobilized: 16 March 1919
55th Aero Squadron	Re-constituted in the Army Air Service on 24 March 1923, as the 55th Pursuit Squadron; Currently: 55th Fighter Squadron, Shaw AFB, South Carolina	
56th Aero Squadron	August 1917	Organized as a construction squadron at Kelly Field, Texas; Re-designated: 468th Aero Squadron, Feb 1918; AEF: Oct 1917 – Jun 1919; Assigned to American Air Service Acceptance Park No. 1, Orly Aerodrome. Demobilized: July 1919, Mitchell Field, New York
57th Aero Squadron	August 1917	Organized as a construction squadron at Kelly Field, Texas; Re-designated: 469th Aero Squadron, Feb 1918; AEF: Oct 1917 – Jun 1919; Assigned to 3d Air Instructional Center, Issoudun Aerodrome. Demobilized: July 1919, Mitchell Field, New York
58th Aero Squadron	August 1917	Organized as a construction squadron at Kelly Field, Texas; Transferred to Aviation General Supply Depot, Camp Morrision, Virginia, October 1917; Re-designated: 470th Aero Squadron, Feb 1918; AEF: Oct 1917 – Jun 1919; Assigned to RAF Aerodrome No. 6, Lopcome Corner, England. Demobilized: July 1919, Mitchell Field, New York
59th Aero Squadron	August 1917	Organized as a construction squadron at Kelly Field, Texas; Transferred to Camp Alfred Vail, New Jersey, Oct 1917; Transferred to Aviation General Supply Depot, Camp Morrision, Virginia, Nov 1917; Re-designated: 471st Aero Squadron, Feb 1918; AEF: Jan 1918 – Jun 1919; Duties Undetermined. Demobilized: July 1919, Mitchell Field, New York
60th Aero Squadron	August 1917	Organized as a construction squadron at Kelly Field, Texas; Transferred to Aviation General Supply Depot, Camp Morrision, Virginia, Oct 1917; Re-designated: 472d Aero Squadron, Feb 1918; AEF: Jan 1918 – Jun 1919; Duties Undetermined. Demobilized: July 1919, Mitchell Field, New York
61st Aero Squadron	August 1917	Organized as a construction squadron at Kelly Field, Texas; Transferred to Aviation General Supply Depot, Camp Morrision, Virginia, Oct 1917; Re-designated: 473d Aero Squadron, Feb 1918; AEF: Jan 1918 – Jun 1919; Duties Undetermined. Demobilized: July 1919, Mitchell Field, New York
62d Aero Squadron	August 1917	Organized as a construction squadron at Kelly Field, Texas; Transferred to Aviation General Supply Depot, Camp Morrision, Virginia, Oct 1917; Re-designated: 474th Aero Squadron, Feb 1918; AEF: Jan 1918 – Jun 1919; Duties consisted of constructing temporary airfields for the First Army Air Service. Demobilized: July 1919, Mitchell Field, New York
63d Aero Squadron	April 1918	Instructional flying squadron Re-designated:Squadron B, Gerstner Field, Louisiana, July 1918; Demobilized: November 1918
64th Aero Squadron	March 1918	Instructional flying squadron Re-designated:Squadron C, Gerstner Field, Louisiana, July 1918; Demobilized: November 1918
65th Aero Squadron	April 1918	Transferred from Kelly Field, Texas; Re-designated:Instructional flying squadron Squadron A, Park Field, Tennessee, July 1918; Demobilized: November 1918
65th Aero Squadron	Constituted in the Army Air Service on 6 June 1921, as Air Park No. 10, Luke Field, Hawaii. Re-designated as the 65th Service Squadron on 22 December 1922; The 65th Aero Squadron was consolidated with the 65th Service Squadron on 16 October 1936; Reorganized and re-designated 25 January 1938, as Base Headquarters and 17th Air Base Squadron; Disbanded 1 April 1943, as HHS, 17th Service Group.	
66th Aero Squadron	May 1918	Instructional flying squadron Re-designated:Squadron A, Eberts Field, Arkansas, July 1918; Demobilized: November 1918
66th Aero Squadron	Constituted in the Army Air Service on 2 June 1921, as Air Park Ho 11, Nichols Field, Philippines; Re-designated as the 66th Service Squadron on 25 January 1923.; The 66th Aero Squadron was consolidated with the 66th Service Squadron in October 1936; Consolidated unit reorganized and re-designated as Base Headquarters and 20th Air Base Squadron.; Reorganized and re-designated 1 September 1940, as HHS, 20th Air Base Group (Reinforced)	
67th Aero Squadron	April 1918	Instructional flying squadron Re-designated:Squadron B, Brooks Field, Texas, July 1918; Demobilized: November 1918
68th Aero Squadron	June 1918	Transferred from Rockwell Field, California; Re-designated:Instructional flying squadron Squadron A, March Field, California, July 1918; Demobilized: November 1918
69th Aero Squadron	February 1918	Instructional flying squadron Re-designated:Squadron A, Ellington Field, Texas, July 1918; Demobilized: November 1918
70th Aero Squadron	February 1918	Instructional flying squadron Re-designated:Squadron B, Ellington Field, Texas, July 1918; Demobilized: November 1918
70th Aero Squadron	Constituted in the Army Air Service as the 70th Service Squadron, and assigned to the 14th School Group, Kelly Field, Texas on 6 February 1923; Consolidated on 27 July 1932, with the 70th Aero Squadron; Inactivated on 1 September 1936, at Hamilton Field, California. Personnel and equipment concurrently transferred to the Base Headquarters and 5th Air Base Squadron.	
71st Aero Squadron	February 1918	Instructional flying squadron Re-designated:Squadron A, Love Field, Texas, July 1918; Demobilized: November 1918
72d Aero Squadron	18 February 1918	AEF: 4 September 1918 – 29 June 1919; Advance Section, Services of Supply (SOS) Air Park Squadron; 1st Air Depot; Colombey-les-Belles Aerodrome; Demobilized: 11 July 1919
72d Aero Squadron	Constituted in the Army Air Service on 6 February 1923, as the 72d Bombardment Squadron. Consolidated on 8 April 1924, with the 72d Aero Squadron; Currently: 72d Test and Evaluation Squadron, Eglin AFB, Florida	
73d Aero Squadron	26 February 1918	AEF: 5 September 1918 – 19 June 1919; Advance Section, Services of Supply (SOS) Air Park Squadron; 1st Air Depot; Colombey-les-Belles Aerodrome; Demobilized: 4 July 1919
73d Aero Squadron	Constituted in the Regular Army Reserve on 18 October 1927, as the 73d Headquarters Squadron; Re-designated as the 73d Pursuit Squadron on 8 May 1929; Designated mobilization training station was Dodd Field, Texas, 1927–31.; Activated on 15 July 1931, less Reserve personnel, at March Field, California; Reorganized and re-designated 73d Attack Squadron on 1 March 1935; Consolidated on 5 June 1936, with the 73d Aero Squadron; Currently: 73d Special Operations Squadron, Cannon AFB, New Mexico	
74th Aero Squadron	22 February 1918	Construction Squadron, did not deploy to AEF; Demobilized: 28 January 1919
74th Aero Squadron	Constituted in the Regular Army Reserve on 18 October 1927, as the 74th Attack Squadron; Re-designated as the 74th Pursuit Squadron on 8 May 1929; Organized Reserve officers assigned to the unit participated in summer training at Fort Crockett, Texas, 1927–33; Activated on 1 October 1933, less Reserve personnel, at Albrook Field, Canal Zone. Consolidated in October 1936 with the 74th Aero Squadron; Served in Panama Canal Zone during World War II as the 74th Bombardment Squadron, equipped with B-24 Liberators. Inactivated 1 November 1946.; Re-designated: 135th Bombardment Squadron (Medium) on 27 March 1951, as part of federalized New York Air National Guard; Activated on 1 May 1951; Inactivated on 1 December 1952.	

=== 75th to 99th Aero Squadrons ===
Aero Squadron	Established	World War I
Notes/Subsequent History
75th Aero Squadron	March 1918	Instructional flying squadron Re-designated:Squadron D, Gerstner Field, Louisiana, July 1918; Demobilized: November 1918
75th Aero Squadron	Constituted in the Regular Army Reserve on 18 October 1927, as the 75th Attack Squadron; Organized Reserve officers assigned to the unit participated in summer training at Fort Crockett, Texas, 1928–30; Activated on 15 September 1930, less Reserve personnel, at Wheeler Field, Hawaii; Consolidated on 16 October 1936, with the 75th Aero Squadron; Reorganized and re-designated Base Headquarters and 18th Air Base Squadron (Single) on 1 March 1938; disbanded 1 April 1943.	
76th Aero Squadron	April 1918	Transferred from Carlstrom Field; Instructional flying squadron Re-designated:Squadron A, Dorr Field, Florida, July 1918; Demobilized: November 1918
77th Aero Squadron	20 February 1918	Instructional flying squadron Re-designated:Squadron A, Barron Field, Texas, July 1918; Demobilized: November 1918
77th Aero Squadron	Constituted in the Regular Army Reserve on 18 October 1927, as the 77th Observation Squadron; Re-designated as the 77th Pursuit Squadron on 8 May 1929; Conducted annual summer training at Love Field or Hensley Field, Texas.; Activated on 15 November 1930, less Reserve personnel, at Mather Field, California; Currently: 77th Fighter Squadron, Shaw AFB, South Carolina	
78th Aero Squadron	28 February 1918	Instructional flying squadron Re-designated:Squadron A, Hicks Field, Texas, July 1918; Demobilized: November 1918
78th Aero Squadron	Constituted in the Regular Army Reserve on 18 October 1927, as the 78th Observation Squadron; Re-designated as the 78th Pursuit Squadron on 8 May 1929; Organized Reserve officers assigned to the unit participated in summer training at Kelly Field 1927–30. Designated mobilization training station was Dodd Field, Texas, 1927–30.; Activated on 1 April 1931, less Reserve personnel, at France Field, Canal Zone; Consolidated in 1933 with the 78th Aero Squadron; Currently: 78th Attack Squadron, Nellis AFB, Nevada	
79th Aero Squadron	22 February 1918	Instructional flying squadron Re-designated: Squadron B, Hicks Field, Texas, July 1918; Demobilized: November 1918
79th Aero Squadron	Constituted in the Regular Army Reserve on 18 October 1927, as the 79th Observation Squadron; Re-designated as the 79th Pursuit Squadron on 8 May 1929; Activated on 1 April 1933, at Barksdale Field, Louisiana; Consolidated on 25 May 1933, with the 79th Aero Squadron; Currently: 79th Fighter Squadron, Shaw AFB, South Carolina.	
80th Aero Squadron	March 1918	First 80th Aero Squadron (Construction): see 492nd Aero Sqn Transferred from Rich Field, Texas; Instructional flying squadron Re-designated: Squadron C, Post Field, Oklahoma, July 1918; Demobilized: November 1918
80th Aero Squadron	Constituted on 18 October 1927, as the 80th Observation Squadron. Re-designated as the 80th Service Squadron on 8 May 1929. Activated on 15 November 1930, at Mather Field, California. The 80th Aero Squadron was consolidated with the 80th Service Squadron 24 August 1932. Transferred to Albrook Field, Canal Zone, same day.; Reorganized and re-designated Base Headquarters and 15th Air Base Squadron on 1 September 1937; disbanded on 1 November 1943	
81st Aero Squadron	March 1918	Transferred from Rich Field, Texas; Instructional flying squadron Re-designated:Squadron D, Post Field, Oklahoma, July 1918; Demobilized: November 1918
81st Aero Squadron	Constituted on 1 March 1935, as the Station Complement, Kelly Field and concurrently activated at Kelly Field, Texas. Reorganized and re-designated 1 September 1936, as the 12th Air Base Squadron and assigned to the Air Corps Advanced Flying School. Concurrently consolidated with the 81st Service Squadron. The 81st Aero Squadron was consolidated with the 81st Service Squadron 1 December 1936.; Reorganized and re-designated 1 September 1940, as HHS, 12th Air Base Group (Special).	
82d Aero Squadron	March 1918	Instructional flying squadron Re-designated: Squadron C, Hicks Field, Texas, July 1918; Demobilized: November 1918
84th Aero Squadron	August 1917	Flying School classification squadron Kelly Field, Texas. Demobilized: August 1919
85th Aero Squadron	17 August 1917	AEF: 5 March 1918 – 20 July 1919; Corps Observation Squadron; Squadron was in training in England but did not reach the front until 4 November 1918. Assigned to Second Army Observation Group and IV Corps Observation Group but did not see any combat. Demobilized 31 July 1919
86th Aero Squadron	17 August 1917	AEF: 25 March 1918 – 23 May 1919; Advance Section, Services of Supply (SOS) Air Park Squadron; Advanced Branch, 1st Air Depot; Behonne Aerodrome; Demobilized: 26 May 1919
86th Aero Squadron	Constituted in the Army Air Corps on 1 March 1935, attached to the Air Corps Tactical School, and organized at Maxwell Field, Alabama; Inactivated on 1 September 1936, at Maxwell Field; Consolidated on 1 December 1936, with the 86th Aero Squadron; Activated on 1 February 1940, at Wheeler Field, Hawaii as 86th Observation Squadron; Suffered devastating losses during Pearl Harbor Attack.; Currently 43d Electronic Combat Squadron, Davis-Monthan AFB, Arizona	
87th Aero Squadron	December 1917	Transferred from Selfridge Field, Michigan; Instructional flying squadron Re-designated: Squadron B, Park Field, Tennessee, Julyl 1918; Demobilized: November 1918
87th Aero Squadron	Constituted in the Army Air Corps on 1 March 1935, assigned to the 20th Pursuit Group, and organized at Maxwell Field, Alabama, with personnel from the 51st and 54th School Squadrons; Attached to the Air Corps Tactical School. Inactivated on 1 September 1936, at Maxwell Field, Alabama.; Consolidated on 1 December 1936, with the 87th Aero Squadron; Organized on 1 March 1935; Inactivated 1 September 1936; Reconstituted, and consolidated (21 March 1979) with unit constituted as 87th Pursuit Squadron (Interceptor) on 13 January 1942, Currently: 87th Flying Training Squadron, Laughlin AFB, Texas.	
88th Aero Squadron	18 August 1917	AEF: 16 November 1917 – 27 June 1919; Corps Observation Squadron; Combat with III Corps Observation Group: Patrols in the Toul, Aisne-Marne, and Vesle Sectors; Champagne-Marne Defensive Campaign; Aisne-Marne Offensive Campaign; St. Mihiel Offensive Campaign; Meuse-Argonne Offensive Campaign
88th Aero Squadron	Returned to the United States on 27 June 1919; Transferred on 5 September 1919, to Langley Field, Virginia.; Constituted in the Army Air Service as the 88th Squadron (Observation) on 14 March 1921; Attached to the 1st Provisional Air Brigade 6 May – 3 October 1921, while supporting the battleship bombing tests off the Virginia coast; Re-designated as the 88th Observation Squadron on 25 January 1923; Re-designated as the 88th Reconnaissance Squadron (Long Range) on 6 December 1939.; Ground elements departed from Fort Douglas 13 November 1941, and sailed from the port of San Francisco on 21 November on an army transport en route to the Philippines. Aircraft and crews began departing Muroc Field, California, on 6 December en route to Hawaii. Elements of the squadron flew their B-17s into Hickam Field at the height of the Japanese attack on Pearl Harbor; Re-designated: 436th Bombardment Squadron (Heavy) 22 April 1942, Currently: 436th Training Squadron, Dyess AFB, Texas	
89th Aero Squadron	19 August 1917	AEF: 16 November 1917 – 25 March 1919; Construction and maintenance squadron Demobilized: 19 May 1919
89th Aero Squadron	Constituted in the Army Air Corps on 1 March 1935, as the 89th Observation Squadron; Consolidated in October 1936 with the 89th Aero Squadron; Re-designated: 432d Bombardment Squadron (Medium) on 22 April 1942; inactivated 26 November 1945.; Currently: 89th Attack Squadron	
90th Aero Squadron	20 August 1917	AEF: 20 November 1917 – 5 May 1919; Corps Observation Squadron; Combat with III Corps Observation Group: Patrols in the Toul Sector; St. Mihiel Offensive Campaign; Meuse-Argonne Offensive Campaign
90th Aero Squadron	Returned to the United States, June 1919 and was assigned to Kelly Field, Texas; Transferred on 29 November 1919, to Sanderson, Texas. Participated in the Mexican Border Patrol operations September 1919 – June 1921; Constituted in the Army Air Service as the 90th Squadron (Attack) on 14 March 1921; Re-designated as the 90th Attack Squadron on 25 June 1923; Transferred on 1 July 1926, to Fort Crockett, Texas. Flew border reconnaissance missions from Fort Huachuca, Arizona, during the Escobar-Topete Revolution 7 April – 2 May 1929; Transferred on 27 February 1935, to Barksdale Field, Louisiana. Reorganized and re-designated 90th Bombardment Squadron (Light) on 15 September 1939; Currently: 90th Fighter Squadron, Elmendorf AFB, Alaska	
91st Aero Squadron	21 August 1917	AEF: 15 November 1917 – 17 June 1919; Army Observation Squadron; Combat with First Army Observation Group: Patrols in the Toul Sector; St. Mihiel Offensive Campaign; Meuse-Argonne Offensive Campaign
91st Aero Squadron	Returned to the United States June 1919 at Mitchel Field, New York; Transferred to Rockwell Field, California, on 29 September 1919; Transferred on 3 November 1919, to Mather Field, California. Transferred on 24 January 1920, to Ream Field, California. Participated in Mexican Border Patrol operations January 1920 – January 1921; Constituted in the Army Air Service as the 91st Squadron (Observation) on 14 March 1921; Re-designated 91st Observation Squadron on 25 January 1923; Currently: 91st Network Warfare Squadron, Lackland AFB, Texas	
92d Aero Squadron	21 August 1917	AEF: 29 October 1917 – 4 December 1918; Trained for night bombardment, never saw combat Demobilized 21 December 1918
92d Aero Squadron	Constituted in the Army Air Corps as the 17th Reconnaissance Squadron (Light) on 20 November 1940; Consolidated with the 92d Aero Squadron in 194; Re-designated 433d Bombardment Squadron (Medium) on 22 April 1942; Re-designated 867th Bombardment Squadron, Heavy on 21 October 1943, Currently 867th Reconnaissance Squadron, Creech AFB, Nevada	
93d Aero Squadron	21 August 1917	AEF: 20 October 1917 – 13 March 1919; Pursuit Squadron; Combat with 3d Pursuit Group: Patrols in the Toul Sector; St. Mihiel Offensive Campaign; Meuse-Argonne Offensive Campaign; Demobilized:31 March 1919
93d Aero Squadron	Constituted in the Regular Army Reserve on 8 May 1929, as the 93rd Attack Squadron; Inactivated on 31 October 1936, at Fort Crockett, Texas by relief of Reserve personnel. Chicago, Illinois, designated as headquarters location on reorganization, but the unit was never reorganized at that location; Consolidated in October 1936 with the 93rd Aero Squadron; Re-designated as the 93rd Bombardment Squadron (Heavy) on 20 October 1939, and organized at March Field, California; Transferred in June 1941 to Albuquerque, New Mexico. Departed from the port of San Francisco on 4 October 1941, on the U.S.A.T. Willard A. Holbrook and arrived at Manila, Philippines, on 23 October 1941. Transferred to Clark Field, Philippines, the same day. Transferred on 6 December 1941, to Del Monte Field, Philippines.; Engaged in 1941–1942 Battle of the Philippines before being withdrawn in late December 1941 to Australia.; Currently: 93d Bomb Squadron (AFRES), Barksdale AFB, Louisiana	
94th Aero Squadron	20 August 1917	AEF: 10 November 1917-1 Jun 1919; Pursuit Squadron; Combat with 1st Pursuit Group: Patrols in the Toul and Aisne-Marne, Vesle and Verdun Sectors; Champagne-Marne Defensive Campaign; Aisne-Marne Offensive Campaign; St. Mihiel Offensive Campaign; Meuse-Argonne Offensive Campaign; Medal of Honor recipient: Capt. Edward V. Rickenbacker
94th Aero Squadron	Returned to the United States June 1919 at Mitchel Field, New York; Constituted in the Army Air Service as the 94th Squadron (Pursuit), 14 March 1921; Currently: 94th Fighter Squadron, Langley AFB, Virginia	
95th Aero Squadron	20 August 1917	AEF: 10 November 1917-1 Mar 1919; Pursuit Squadron; Combat with 1st Pursuit Group: Patrols in the Toul and Aisne-Marne, Vesle and Verdun Sectors; Champagne-Marne Defensive Campaign; Aisne-Marne Offensive Campaign; St. Mihiel Offensive Campaign; Meuse-Argonne Offensive Campaign; Demobilized: 18 March 1919
95th Aero Squadron	Re-constituted and organized on 12 August 1919, in the Air Service, United States Army as the 95th Aero Squadron; Constituted in the Army Air Service as the 95th Squadron (Pursuit) on 14 March 1921; Currently: 95th Reconnaissance Squadron, Offut AFB, Nebraska	
96th Aero Squadron	20 August 1917	AEF: 10 November 1917 – 2 May 1919; Day Bombardment Squadron; Combat with 1st Day Bombardment Group: Patrols in the Toul Sector; St. Mihiel Offensive Campaign; Meuse-Argonne Offensive Campaign
96th Aero Squadron	Returned to the United States, June 1919 and stationed at Ellington Field, Texas; Participated in Mexican Border Patrols August 1919-10 January 1920; Constituted in the Army Air Service as the 96th Squadron (Bombardment) on 14 March 1921; Attached to the 1st Provisional Air Brigade 20 May – 26 October 1921, while supporting the battleship bombing tests off the Virginia coast; Currently: 96th Bomb Squadron, Barksdale AFB, Louisiana	
97th Aero Squadron	20 August 1917	AEF: 15 November 1917 – 20 January 1919; Served as engine maintenance squadron Demobilized 3 February 1919
97th Aero Squadron	Constituted in the Army Air Corps on 1 March 1935; Consolidated on 5 June 1936, with the 97th Aero Squadron; Served during World War II as 97th Tactical Reconnaissance Squadron, a training unit for desert warfare in the Mojave Desert, Southern California. Disbanded on 15 April 1944.; Re-activated as: 6949th Security Squadron, 1 March 1979; Reconstituted and consolidated (1 October 1993) with the 6949th Security Squadron and re-designated the 97th Intelligence Squadron on 1 October 1993, Currently: 97th Intelligence Squadron	
98th Aero Squadron	August 1917	Organized as the 98th Aero Squadron (Service) at Kelly Field, Texas; AEF: 7th AIC, Aulnat, October 1917 – January 1919; Demobilized: February 1919
98th Aero Squadron	Constituted in the United States Army Air Corps as the 98th School Squadron, and assigned to the Air Corps Technical School, Chanute Field, Illinois on 1 August 1933; Consolidated in 1934 with the 98th Aero Squadron; Reorganized and re-designated 98th Service Squadron on 1 March 1935. Reorganized and re-designated 10th Air Base Squadron on 1 July 1936. Subsequent lineage undetermined.	
99th Aero Squadron	21 August 1917	AEF: 12 December 1917– 25 May 1919; Corps Observation Squadron; Combat with V Corps Observation Group: Patrols in the Toul and St. Die Sectors; St. Mihiel Offensive Campaign; Meuse-Argonne Offensive Campaign
99th Aero Squadron	Returned to the United States, June 1919 and stationed at Hazelhurst Field, New York; Transferred on 17 August 1919, to Bolling Field, District of Columbia.; Constituted in the Army Air Service as the 99th Squadron (Observation) on 14 March 1921; Currently: 99th Reconnaissance Squadron, Beale AFB, California	

=== 100th to 149th Aero Squadrons ===
Aero Squadron	Established	World War I
Aero Squadron	Notes/Subsequent History	
100th Aero Squadron	20 August 1917	AEF: February 1919 – June 1919; Day Bombardment Squadron; Assigned to 2d Day Bombardment Group (Did not see combat); Demobilized: 30 June 1919
100th Aero Squadron	Constituted in the Army Air Corps as the 100th Service Squadron on 1 March 1935 Consolidated in 1935 with the 100th Aero Squadron; Consolidated with the Station Complement, Bolling Field, District of Columbia and consolidated unit re-designated Base Headquarters and 14th Air Base Squadron on 1 September 1936. Subsequent history/lineage undetermined.	
101st Aero Squadron	22 August 1917	AEF: 1 January 1918 – 5 April 1919; Service Squadron; Demobilized: 14 April 1919
101st Aero Squadron	Constituted in the National Guard in 1921 as the 101st Squadron (Observation), and allotted to the state of Massachusetts; federally recognized on 18 November 1921, at Boston. Stationed at Boston Airport; Consolidated on 20 October 1936, with the 101st Aero Squadron Currently Massachusetts ANG 101st Intelligence Squadron	
102d Aero Squadron	23 August 1917	AEF: 9 December 1917 – 19 April 1919; Service Squadron; Demobilized: 1 May 1919
102d Aero Squadron	Constituted in the National Guard on 30 December 1920, as the 102nd Squadron (Observation), and allotted to the state of New York; Organized on 17 November 1921, from the Observation Squadron, New York National Guard (organized on 22 March 1921, at Hempstead, Long Island, New York, with personnel from K Company, 14th Infantry, New York National Guard). Concurrently federally recognized at Hempstead; Consolidated on 20 October 1936, with the 102d Aero Squadron Currently New York ANG 102d Rescue Squadron	
103d Aero Squadron	31 August 1917	Former French Lafayette Escadrille and Lafayette Flying Corps (Escadrille N.124); AEF: 23 December 1917 – 4 March 1918; Pursuit Squadron; Combat with 3d Pursuit Group: Patrols in the Champagne, Aisine, Ypres-Lys (Belgium) and Toul Sectors; St. Mihiel Offensive Campaign; Meuse-Argonne Offensive Campaign; Demobilized: 18 August 1919
103d Aero Squadron	Constituted in the Army Air Service as the 94th Squadron (Pursuit) on 14 March 1921; Re-constituted and consolidated with the 103d Aero Squadron, 8 April 1924; consolidated unit designated 94th Pursuit Squadron Currently: 94th Fighter Squadron, Langley AFB, Virginia	
104th Aero Squadron	25 August 1917	AEF: 7 December 1917 – 28 April 1919; Corps Observation Squadron; Combat with V Corps Observation Group: St. Mihiel Offensive Campaign; Meuse-Argonne Offensive Campaign
104th Aero Squadron	Re-constituted in the Army Air Service as the 13th Squadron (Attack) on 14 March 1921; Consolidated with 13th Aero Squadron, 16 October 1936, Currently: 13th Bomb Squadron, Whiteman AFB, Missouri	
105th Aero Squadron	27 August 1917	AEF: 8 December 1917 – 27 April 1919; Service Squadron; Demobilized: 8 May 1919
105th Aero Squadron	Constituted in the National Guard in 1921 as the 136th Squadron (Observation) and allotted to the state of Tennessee; Originally organized in the fall of 1920, the squadron was federally recognized on 4 December 1921, at Blackwood Field, Nashville, Tennessee.; Currently Tennessee ANG 105th Airlift Squadron	
106th Aero Squadron	March 1918	Instructional flying squadron Re-designated:Squadron B, Barron Field, Texas, July 1918; Demobilized: November 1918
107th Aero Squadron	March 1918	Instructional flying squadron Re-designated:Squadron A, Carlstrom Field, Florida, July 1918; Demobilized: November 1918
108th Aero Squadron	March 1918	Instructional flying squadron Re-designated:Squadron B, Carlstrom Field, Florida, July 1918; Demobilized: November 1918
109th Aero Squadron	April 1918	Transferred from Carlstrom Field; Instructional flying squadron Re-designated:Squadron B, Dorr Field, Florida, July 1918; Demobilized: November 1918
110th Aero Squadron	May 1918	Instructional flying squadron Re-designated:Squadron C, Dorr Field, Florida, July 1918; Demobilized: November 1918
110th Aero Squadron	Constituted in the National Guard in 1921 as the 110th Squadron (Observation) and allotted to the state of Missouri; Organized and federally recognized on 23 June 1923, at Anglum Field, St. Louis, Missouri. 1st Lt. Charles Lindbergh was a member of the squadron 1925–27.; Currently Missouri ANG 110th Bomb Squadron	
111th Aero Squadron	May 1918	Transferred from Dorr Field, Florida; Instructional flying squadron Re-designated: Squadron C, Carlstrom Field, Florida, July 1918; Demobilized: November 1918
111th Aero Squadron	Constituted in the National Guard in 1921 as the 111th Squadron (Observation) and allotted to the state of Texas; Organized in April 1923 and federally recognized on 29 June 1923, at Ellington Field, Houston, Texas.; Currently Texas ANG 111th Reconnaissance Squadron	
112th Aero Squadron	May 1918	Instructional flying squadron Re-designated:Squadron B, Chanute Field, Illinois, July 1918; Demobilized: November 1918
112th Aero Squadron	Constituted in the National Guard in 1921 as the 112th Squadron (Observation) and allotted to the state of Ohio; Organized and federally recognized on 20 June 1927, at Cleveland Airport, Cleveland, Ohio Currently Ohio ANG 112th Fighter Squadron	
112th Aero Squadron (II)	December 1918	Service Squadron, Aviation General Supply Depot Americus, Georgia; Demobilized: December 1919
112th Aero Squadron (II)	Depot was established in March 1918 as a general supply depot. The depot was located adjacent to Souther Field. It supplied materiel to aviation fields and in particular to the Air Service training fields: Park Field, Tennessee, Taylor Field, Alabama, Payne Field, Mississippi, Carlstrom Field, and Dorr Field, Florida. The 112th and 287th Aero Squadrons were consolidated into "Aviation Supply Depot Detachment" 1 January 1919.	
113th Aero Squadron	March 1918	Instructional flying squadron Re-designated:Squadron C, Ellington Field, Texas, July 1918; Demobilized: November 1918
113th Aero Squadron	Constituted in the National Guard in 1921 as the 113th Squadron (Observation) and allotted to the state of Indiana; Organized and federally recognized on 20 June 1927, at Cleveland Airport, Cleveland, Ohio Currently Indiana ANG 113th Air Support Operations Squadron	
114th Aero Squadron	February 1918	Instructional flying squadron Re-designated:Squadron A, Scott Field, Illinois, July 1918; Demobilized: November 1918
115th Aero Squadron	March 1918	Instructional flying squadron Re-designated:Squadron B, Kelly Field, Texas, July 1918; Demobilized: November 1918
116th Aero Squadron	March 1918	Instructional flying squadron Re-designated:Squadron B, Souther Field, Georgia, July 1918; Demobilized: November 1918
117th Aero Squadron	March 1918	Instructional flying squadron Re-designated:Squadron C, Kelly Field, Texas, July 1918; Demobilized: November 1918
118th Aero Squadron	April 1918	Instructional flying squadron Re-designated:Squadron C, Brooks Field, Texas, July 1918; Demobilized: November 1918
119th Aero Squadron	May 1917	Organized as 5th Aviation School Squadron; Re-designated 119th Aero Squadron, September 1917; Re-designated: 11th Detachment, Air Service Aircraft Production, August 1918; Langley Field, Virginia; Demobilized: 29 May 1919
119th Aero Squadron	Constituted in the National Guard in 1921 as the 119th Squadron (Observation) and allotted to the state of New Jersey; Organized and federally recognized on 30 January 1930, at Newark Airport, Newark, New Jersey, Currently New Jersey ANG 119th Fighter Squadron	
120th Aero Squadron	28 August 1917	AEF: 9 March 1918 – 7 May 1919 1919; Service Squadron; Demobilized: 17 May 1919
120th Aero Squadron	Constituted in the National Guard in 1921 as the 120th Squadron (Observation) and allotted to the state of Colorado; Organized and federally recognized on 27 January 1923, at Denver Municipal Airport, Denver, Colorado, with Flight A located at Denver and Flight B at Pueblo Currently Colorado ANG 120th Fighter Squadron	
121st Aero Squadron	April 1918	Instructional flying squadron Re-designated:Squadron B, Love Field, Texas, July 1918; Demobilized: November 1918
122nd Aero Squadron	March 1918	Formed at Kelly Field Texas and then to Camp Alfred Vail New Jersey until November 1918; Demobilized: January 1919
123d Aero Squadron	April 1918	Instructional flying squadron Re-designated:Squadron B, Eberts Field, Arkansas, July 1918; Demobilized: November 1918
124th Aero Squadron	April 1918	Instructional flying squadron Re-designated:Squadron C, Eberts Field, Arkansas, July 1918; Demobilized: November 1918
125th Aero Squadron	April 1918	Instructional flying squadron Re-designated:Squadron D, Eberts Field, Arkansas, July 1918; Demobilized: November 1918
128th Aero Squadron	April 1918	Instructional flying squadron Re-designated:Squadron A, Taylor Field, Alabama, July 1918; Demobilized: November 1918
129th Aero Squadron	April 1918	Instructional flying squadron Re-designated:Squadron D, Taylor Field, Alabama, July 1918; Demobilized: November 1918
131st Aero Squadron	March 1918	Instructional flying squadron Re-designated:Squadron B, Taylor Field, Alabama, July 1918; Demobilized: November 1918
132d Aero Squadron	April 1918	Instructional flying squadron Re-designated:Squadron C, Rockwell Field, California, July 1918; Demobilized: November 1918
133d Aero Squadron	April 1918	Instructional flying squadron Re-designated:Squadron D, Rockwell Field, California, July 1918; Demobilized: November 1918
134th Aero Squadron	April 1918	Instructional flying squadron Re-designated:Squadron D, Brooks Field, Texas, July 1918; Demobilized: November 1918
135th Aero Squadron	1 August 1917	AEF: 31 December 1917 – 7 May 1919; Corps Observation Squadron; Combat with IV Corps Observation Group: Patrols in the Toul Sector; St. Mihiel Offensive Campaign
135th Aero Squadron	Returned to the United States in June 1919 and Stationed at Post Field, Oklahoma; Constituted in the Army Air Service as the 22d Squadron (Observation) on 14 March 1921, Currently: 22d Intelligence Squadron, Fort George G. Meade, Maryland	
136th Aero Squadron	April 1918	Instructional flying squadron Re-designated:Squadron C, Love Field, Texas, July 1918; Demobilized: November 1918
137th Aero Squadron	9 September 1917	AEF: 18 March 1918 – March 1919; Service support squadron Trained in England entire period Demobilized: March 1919
138th Aero Squadron	28 September 1917	AEF: 18 March 1918 – August 1919; Pursuit Squadron; Assigned to 5th Pursuit Group (Did not see combat)Demobilized 30 August 1919
139th Aero Squadron	21 September 1917	AEF: 5 March 1918 – 15 June 1919; Pursuit Squadron; Combat with 2d Pursuit Group: Patrols in the Toul and Toul-Verdun Sectors; St. Mihiel Offensive Campaign; Meuse-Argonne Offensive Campaign; Demobilized: 17 June 1919
141st Aero Squadron	8 October 1917	AEF: 9 January 1918 – July 1919; Pursuit Squadron; Combat with 4th Pursuit Group: Meuse-Argonne Offensive Campaign; Demobilized 19 July 1919
141st Aero Squadron	Constituted in the Army Air Corps as the 341st Fighter Squadron on 24 September 1942; Inactivated on 10 May 1946; Constituted in the National Guard on 24 May 1946, as the 141st Fighter Squadron, and allotted to the state of New Jersey; 141st Aero Squadron (Pursuit), was reconstituted and allotted to the State of New Jersey and consolidated with the 141st Tactical Fighter Squadron, 8 September 1973, Currently: New Jersey ANG 141st Air Refueling Squadron	
142d Aero Squadron	4 October 1917	AEF: 4 March 1918 – March 1919; Trained as Observation Squadron in England, never entered combat Demobilized: April 1919
144th Aero Squadron	October 1917	Post Exchange service squadron Kelly Field, Texas. Demobilized: September 1919
145th Aero Squadron	October 1917	Aircraft repair squadron Kelly Field, Texas. Demobilized: September 1919
147th Aero Squadron	10 November 1917	AEF: 14 March 1918 – 19 March 1919; Pursuit Squadron; Combat with 1st Pursuit Group: Patrols in the Toul, Aisne-Marne, Vesle and Verdun Sectors; Champagne-Marne Defensive Campaign; Aisne-Marne Offensive Campaign; St. Mihiel Offensive Campaign; Meuse-Argonne Offensive Campaign
147th Aero Squadron	Returned to the United States in June 1919 and Stationed at Selfridge Field, Michigan; Constituted in the Army Air Service as the 17th Squadron (Pursuit) on 14 March 1921, Currently: 17th Weapons Squadron, Nellis AFB, Nevada	
148th Aero Squadron	11 November 1917	AEF: 5 March 1918 – 22 March 1919; Pursuit Squadron (Primarily assigned to Royal Air Force): Patrols in the Amiens-Arras and Nieuport-Ypres (Belgium) Sectors; Somme Defensive Campaign; Somme Offensive Campaign; Demobilized: 24 March 1919
149th Aero Squadron	7 December 1917	AEF: 5 March 1918 – March 1919; Instructional flying squadron (Pursuit); 3d Air Instructional Center, Issoudun Aerodrome; Demobilized: March 1919

=== 150th to 199th Aero Squadrons ===
Aero Squadron	Established	World War I
Aero Squadron	Notes/Subsequent History	
150th Aero Squadron	November 1917	Instructional flying squadron Re-designated:Squadron B, Rich Field, Texas, July 1918; Demobilized: November 1918
151st Aero Squadron	8 December 1917	AEF: 5 March 1918 – March 1919; Service support squadron Air Service Production Center No. 2. Romorantin Aerodrome; Demobilized: March 1919
152d Aero Squadron	8 December 1917	AEF: 5 March 1918 – March 1919; Trained as Pursuit Squadron in England, never entered combat Demobilized: March 1919
153d Aero Squadron	8 December 1917	AEF: 16 February 1918 – July 1919; Trained as Pursuit Squadron in England, never entered combat Demobilized: July 1919
154th Aero Squadron	8 December 1917	AEF: 9 March 1918 – 23 January 1919; Service Squadron; Demobilized: 1 February 1919
154th Aero Squadron	Constituted in the National Guard in 1921 as the 154th Squadron (Observation), assigned to the 320th Observation Group, and allotted to the Seventh Corps Area. Allotted to the Organized Reserve as a Deferred National Guard unit, and re-designated as the 564th Observation Squadron. Withdrawn from the Organized Reserve on 10 September 1925, and allotted to the Arkansas National Guard as the 154th Observation Squadron; Organized and federally recognized on 24 October 1925, at Little Rock Airport, Little Rock, Arkansas.; Consolidated on 20 October 1936, with the 154th Aero Squadron Currently Arkansas ANG 154th Training Squadron	
155th Aero Squadron	1 December 1917	AEF: 4 March 1918 – March 1919; Night Bombardment squadron, did not reach front lines by the time of the armistice. Demobilized: March 1919
155th Aero Squadron	Was the first night bombardment squadron in the AEF. Flew Dayton-Wright DH-4s from 1st Air Depot after the armistice looking for crashed aircraft for recovery.	
156th Aero Squadron	10 December 1917	AEF: 18 March 1918 – 25 November 1918; Arrived New York City on 2 December 1918, and was mustered out at Air Service Depot, Garden City, Long Island, N.Y.
156th Aero Squadron	Quarantined in U.S. for measles, mumps, and scarlet fever which delayed departure for AEF. It also probably prevented the squadron from seeing service in France before armistice as their departure was scheduled four days later. Squadron was proud of helping RAF run the aerodrome at TADCASTER (Bramham Moor), Yorkshire during Spanish Influenza epidemics.	
157th Aero Squadron	10 December 1917	AEF: 5 March 1918 – December 1918; Service support squadron II Corps Aeronautical School; Chatillion-sur-Seine Aerodrome; Demobilized: December 1918
158th Aero Squadron	18 December 1917	AEF: 9 September 1918 – May 1919; Trained as Pursuit Squadron in England, never entered combat Demobilized: June 1919
158th Aero Squadron	Squadron was torpedoed on SS Tuscania, 5 February 1918, during overseas transport. Reformed in England but never reached combat.	
159th Aero Squadron	10 December 1917	AEF: 2 November 1918 – March 1919; Trained as Day Bombardment Squadron in England, never entered combat Demobilized: March 1919
159th Aero Squadron	Squadron was torpedoed on SS Tuscania, 5 February 1918, during overseas transport. Reformed in England but never reached combat.	
160th Aero Squadron	December 1917	Transferred from Kelly Field, Texas; Instructional flying squadron Re-designated:Squadron C, Park Field, Tennessee, July 1918; Demobilized: November 1918
161st Aero Squadron	12 December 1917	AEF: 4 March 1918 – May 1919; Advance Section, Services of Supply (SOS) Air Park Squadron; 5th Air Depot; Vinets Aerodrome; Demobilized: May 1919
162d Aero Squadron	17 December 1917	AEF: 5 March 1918 – February 1919; Trained as Pursuit Squadron in England, never entered combat Demobilized: February 1919
163d Aero Squadron	18 December 1917	AEF: 6 March 1918 – June 1919; Day Bombardment Squadron; Combat with 2d Day Bombardment Group; Demobilized: 13 June 1919
164th Aero Squadron	November 1917	Instructional flying squadron Re-designated:Squadron A, Call Field, Texas, July 1918; Demobilized: November 1918
165th Aero Squadron	26 November 1917	AEF: 5 March 1918 – June 1919; Service support squadron Air Service Production Center No. 2. Romorantin Aerodrome; Demobilized: June 1918
166th Aero Squadron	18 December 1917	AEF: 19 March 1919 – 17 June 1919; Day Bombardment Squadron; Combat with 1st Day Bombardment Group
166th Aero Squadron	Returned to the United States on 17 June 1919, and stationed at Mitchel Field, New York.; Transferred on 26 September 1919, to Kelly Field, Texas; Constituted in the Army Air Service as the 49th Squadron (Bombardment) on 14 March 1921, Currently: 49th Test and Evaluation Squadron, Barksdale AFB, Louisiana	
168th Aero Squadron	12 December 1917	AEF: 16 February 1918 – 15 July 1919; Corps Observation Squadron; Combat with IV Corps Bombardment Group; Demobilized 22 July 1919
169th Aero Squadron	15 December 1917	AEF: 4 March 1918 – May 1919; Trained as Observation Squadron in England, never entered combat Demobilized: May 1919
170th Aero Squadron	18 December 1917	AEF: 18 March 1918 – May 1919; Trained as Service support squadron in England; Demobilized: May 1919
171st Aero Squadron	29 November 1917	AEF: 4 March 1918 – June 1919; Trained as Service support squadron in England; Demobilized: July 1919
172d Aero Squadron	10 December 1917	AEF: 4 March 1918 – May 1919; Trained as Observation Squadron in England, never entered combat Demobilized: May 1919
173d Aero Squadron	19 December 1917	AEF: 9 July 1917 – March 1919; Service support squadron 3d Aviation Instruction Center; Issoudun Aerodrome; Demobilized: March 1919
174th Aero Squadron	19 December 1917	AEF: 6 March 1918 – April 1919; Trained as Observation Squadron in England, never entered combat Demobilized: April 1919
175th Aero Squadron	April 1918	Transferred from Ellington Field, Texas; Instructional flying squadron Re-designated:Squadron A, Payne Field, Mississippi, July 1918; Demobilized: November 1918
176th Aero Squadron	19 December 1917	AEF: 4 March 1918 – March 1919; Trained as Service support squadron in England; Demobilized: March 1919
178th Aero Squadron	March 1918	Instructional flying squadron Re-designated:Squadron D, Kelly Field, Texas, July 1918; Demobilized: November 1918
179th Aero Squadron	April 1918	Instructional flying squadron Re-designated:Squadron E, Brooks Field, Texas, July 1918; Demobilized: November 1918
180th Aero Squadron	December 1917	Instructional flying squadron Re-designated:Squadron E, Kelly Field, Texas, July 1918; Demobilized: November 1918
181st Aero Squadron	March 1918	Instructional flying squadron Re-designated:Squadron E, Eberts Field, Arkansas, July 1918; Demobilized: November 1918
182d Aero Squadron	22 November 1917	AEF: 31 May 1918 – March 1919; Trained as Service support squadron in England; Demobilized: March 1919
183d Aero Squadron	December 1917	AEF: May 1918 – September 1919; Re-designated: 1st Air Park; V Corps Observation Group; Aircraft/Vehicle maintenance and supply unit Demobilized: September 1919
184th Aero Squadron	2 December 1917	AEF: 7 July 1918 – March 1919; Trained as Service support squadron in England; Demobilized: March 1919
185th Aero Squadron	11 November 1917	AEF: 16 February 1918 – 15 May 1919; Night Pursuit Squadron; Combat with 1st Pursuit Group; Demobilized: 30 June 1919
186th Aero Squadron	16 November 1917	AEF: 16 February 1918 – June 1919; Army Observation Squadron; Combat with First Army Observation Group; Demobilized: 30 June 1919
187th Aero Squadron	TBD 1917	AEF: TBD 1918 – TBD; TBD; Demobilized: TBD 1918
188th Aero Squadron	9 November 1917	AEF: 18 March 1918 – December 1918; Trained as Service support squadron in England; Demobilized: December 1918
192d Aero Squadron	December 1917	Instructional flying squadron Re-designated:Squadron B, Call Field, Texas, July 1918; Demobilized: November 1918
193d Aero Squadron	April 1918	Instructional flying squadron Re-designated:Squadron C, Taylor Field, Alabama, July 1918; Demobilized: November 1918
195th Aero Squadron	March 1918	Instructional flying squadron Re-designated:Squadron F, Gerstner Field, Louisiana, July 1918; Demobilized: November 1918
196th Aero Squadron	March 1918	Instructional flying squadron Re-designated:Squadron G, Gerstner Field, Louisiana, July 1918; Demobilized: November 1918
197th Aero Squadron	February 1918	Instructional flying squadron Re-designated:Squadron D, Love Field, Texas, July 1918; Demobilized: November 1918
198th Aero Squadron	December 1917	Instructional flying squadron Re-designated:Squadron C, Call Field, Texas, July 1918; Demobilized: November 1918
199th Aero Squadron	27 November 1917	AEF: 4 March 1918 – May 1919; Trained as Service support squadron in England; Demobilized: June 1919

=== 200th to 249th Aero Squadrons ===
Aero Squadron	Established	World War I
Aero Squadron	Notes/Subsequent History	
200th Aero Squadron	June 1918	Instructional flying squadron Re-designated:Squadron A, Mather Field, California, July 1918; Demobilized: November 1918
201st Aero Squadron	June 1918	Instructional flying squadron Re-designated:Squadron B, Mather Field, California, July 1918; Demobilized: November 1918
202d Aero Squadron	March 1918	Instructional flying squadron Re-designated:Squadron E, Post Field, Oklahoma, July 1918; Demobilized: November 1918
203d Aero Squadron	March 1918	Instructional flying squadron Re-designated:Squadron C, Chanute Field, Illinois, July 1918; Demobilized: November 1918
204th Aero Squadron	April 1918	Instructional flying squadron Re-designated:Squadron E, Rockwell Field, California, July 1918; Demobilized: November 1918
205th Aero Squadron	April 1918	Instructional flying squadron Re-designated:Squadron D, Carlstrom Field, Florida, July 1918; Demobilized: November 1918
206th Aero Squadron	April 1918	Instructional flying squadron Re-designated:Squadron D, Hicks Field, Texas, July 1918; Demobilized: November 1918
207th Aero Squadron	March 1918	Instructional flying squadron Re-designated:Squadron C, Barron Field, Texas, July 1918; Demobilized: November 1918
208th Aero Squadron	April 1918	Instructional flying squadron Re-designated:Squadron A, Benbrook Field, Texas, July 1918; Demobilized: November 1918
209th Aero Squadron	April 1918	Instructional flying squadron Re-designated:Squadron B, Benbrook Field, Texas, July 1918; Demobilized: November 1918
212th Aero Squadron	June 1918	Flying School service support squadron Kelly Field, Texas. Demobilized: August 1919
213th Aero Squadron	1 December 1917	AEF: February 1918-11 June 1919; Pursuit Squadron; Combat with 3d Pursuit Group: Patrols in the Toul Sector; St. Mihiel Offensive Campaign; Meuse-Argonne Offensive Campaign; Demobilized 30 June 1919
214th Aero Squadron	December 1917	Instructional flying squadron Re-designated:Squadron D, Park Field, Tennessee, July 1918; Demobilized: November 1918
215th Aero Squadron	June 1918	Transferred from Rockwell Field, California; Instructional flying squadron Re-designated:Squadron B, March Field, California, July 1918; Demobilized: November 1918
218th Aero Squadron	January 1918	AEF: June 1918 – June 1919; Re-designated: 4d Air Park; 1st Pursuit Group; Aircraft/Vehicle maintenance and supply unit Demobilized: July 1919
221st Aero Squadron	16 December 1917	Instructional flying squadron Re-designated:Squadron B, Scott Field, Illinois, July 1918; Demobilized: November 1918
222d Aero Squadron	16 December 1917	AEF: 18 March 1918 – June 1919; In training in England entire period Demobilized: July 1919
223d Aero Squadron	10 January 1918	AEF: 29 August 1918 – June 1919; Advance Section, Services of Supply (SOS) Air Park Squadron; 1st Air Depot; Colombey-les-Belles Aerodrome; Demobilized: July 1919
227th Aero Squadron	12 January 1918	AEF: 13 July 1918 – June 1919; Service support squadron 7th Aviation Instruction Center; Clermont-Ferrand Aerodrome; Demobilized: July 1919
229th Aero Squadron	April 1918	Instructional flying squadron Re-designated:Squadron C, Benbrook Field, Texas, July 1918; Demobilized: November 1918
232d Aero Squadron	April 1918	Instructional flying squadron Re-designated:Squadron D, Ellington Field, Texas, July 1918; Demobilized: November 1918
233d Aero Squadron	April 1918	Instructional flying squadron Re-designated:Squadron E, Ellington Field, Texas, July 1918; Demobilized: November 1918
234th Aero Squadron	June 1918	Instructional flying squadron Re-designated:Squadron F, Brooks Field, Texas, July 1918; Demobilized: November 1918
235th Aero Squadron	April 1918	Instructional flying squadron Re-designated:Squadron F, Kelly Field, Texas, July 1918; Demobilized: November 1918
236th Aero Squadron	April 1918	Instructional flying squadron Re-designated:Squadron C, Souther Field, Georgia, July 1918; Demobilized: November 1918
237th Aero Squadron	April 1918	Instructional flying squadron Re-designated:Squadron D, Souther Field, Georgia, July 1918; Demobilized: November 1918
238th Aero Squadron	April 1918	Transferred from Kelly Field, Texas; Instructional flying squadron Re-designated:Squadron B, Payne Field, Mississippi, July 1918; Demobilized: November 1918
239th Aero Squadron	April 1918	Transferred from Kelly Field, Texas; Instructional flying squadron Re-designated:Squadron C, Payne Field, Mississippi, July 1918; Demobilized: November 1918
240th Aero Squadron	May 1918	Instructional flying squadron Re-designated:Squadron D, Dorr Field, Florida, July 1918; Demobilized: November 1918
241st Aero Squadron	May 1918	Instructional flying squadron Re-designated:Squadron E, Dorr Field, Florida, July 1918; Demobilized: November 1918
242d Aero Squadron	April 1918	Instructional flying squadron Re-designated:Squadron C, Scott Field, Illinois, July 1918; Demobilized: November 1918
243d Aero Squadron	April 1918	Instructional flying squadron Re-designated:Squadron G, Kelly Field, Texas, July 1918; Demobilized: November 1918
244th Aero Squadron	April 1918	Instructional flying squadron Re-designated:Squadron H, Kelly Field, Texas, July 1918; Demobilized: November 1918
245th Aero Squadron	April 1918	Instructional flying squadron Re-designated:Squadron I, Kelly Field, Texas, July 1918; Demobilized: November 1918
246th Aero Squadron	July 1917	Instructional flying squadron Re-designated:Squadron L, Wilbur Wright Field, Ohio, July 1918; Demobilized: November 1918
247th Aero Squadron	1 February 1918	AEF: 18 March 1918 – March 1919; In training in England entire period Demobilized: March 1919.
248th Aero Squadron	1 February 1918	AEF: 18 March 1918 – March 1919; In training in England entire period Demobilized: April 1919
249th Aero Squadron	November 1917	Instructional flying squadron Re-designated:Squadron C, Rich Field, Texas, July 1918; Demobilized: November 1918

=== 250th to 299th Aero Squadrons ===
Aero Squadron	Established	World War I
Aero Squadron	Notes/Subsequent History	
250th Aero Squadron	November 1917	Instructional flying squadron Re-designated:Squadron F, Ellington Field, Texas, July 1918; Demobilized: November 1918
251st Aero Squadron	March 1918	Instructional flying squadron Re-designated:Squadron F, Post Field, Oklahoma, July 1918; Demobilized: November 1918
252d Aero Squadron	April 1918	Transferred from Ellington Field, Texas; Instructional flying squadron Re-designated:Squadron D, Payne Field, Mississippi, July 1918i Demobilized: November 1918
255th Aero Squadron	9 February 1918	AEF: July 1918 – June 1919; Re-designated: 3d Air Park; V Corps Balloon Group; Aircraft/Vehicle maintenance and supply unit Demobilized: June 1919* Constituted in the Army Air Service as Air Park No. 3, and assigned to the 2d Wing (Provisional), Langley Field, Virginia on 30 August 1921; Re-designated as the 58th Service Squadron on 16 January 1923; Consolidated on 8 April 1924, with Air Park No. 3; Consolidated on 1 September 1936, with HHS, 8th Pursuit Group.*Subsequent lineage and history undetermined.
257th Aero Squadron	14 February 1918	AEF: 12 June 1918 – April 1919; Instructional flying squadron 3d Aviation Instruction Center; Issoudun Aerodrome; Demobilized: April 1919
258th Aero Squadron	1 January 1918	AEF: 12 June 1918 – 1 August 1919; Corps Observation Squadron; Demobilized 1 August 1919
259th Aero Squadron	14 February 1918	AEF: 31 July 1918 – December 1918; In training in England entire period. Demobilized: December 1918
260th Aero Squadron	14 February 1918	AEF: 31 July 1918 – December 1918; In training in England entire period. Demobilized: December 1918
261st Aero Squadron	7 February 1918	AEF: 31 July 1918 – December 1918; In training in England entire period. Demobilized: December 1918
264th Aero Squadron	13 January 1918	AEF: 6 March 1918 – December 1918; In training in England entire period. Demobilized: December 1918
266th Aero Squadron	6 January 1918	AEF: 27 August 1918 – December 1918; Service support squadron 2d Aviation Instruction Center; Tours Aerodrome; Demobilized: December 1918
267th Aero Squadron	26 January 1918	AEF: 5 August 1918– December 1918; In training in England entire period. Demobilized: December 1918
269th Aero Squadron	26 January 1918	AEF: 5 August 1918 – July 1919; Advance Section, Services of Supply (SOS) Air Park Squadron; 1st Air Depot; Colombey-les-Belles Aerodrome; Demobilized: July 1919
270th Aero Squadron	8 February 1918	AEF: 26 August 1918 – July 1918; Advance Section, Services of Supply (SOS) Air Park Squadron; 1st Air Depot; Colombey-les-Belles Aerodrome; Demobilized: July 1919
272d Aero Squadron	April 1918	Instructional flying squadron Re-designated:Squadron E, Ellington Field, Texas, July 1918; Demobilized: November 1918
273d Aero Squadron	March 1918	Instructional flying squadron Re-designated:Squadron D, Barron Field, Texas, July 1918; Demobilized: November 1918
274th Aero Squadron	April 1918	Instructional flying squadron Re-designated:Squadron D, Benbrook Field, Texas, July 1918; Demobilized: November 1918
275th Aero Squadron	February 1918	Instructional flying squadron Re-designated:Squadron E, Hicks Field, Texas, July 1918; Demobilized: November 1918
278th Aero Squadron	14 February 1918	AEF: 27 August 1918 – 13 June 1919; Corps Observation Squadron; Demobilized 13 June 1919
279th Aero Squadron	February 1918	AEF: September 1918 – March 1919; Re-designated: 5th Air Park; 2d Pursuit Group; Aircraft/Vehicle maintenance and supply unit Demobilized: March 1919
281st Aero Squadron	8 February 1918	AEF: 26 August 1918 – July 1918; Advance Section, Services of Supply (SOS) Air Park Squadron; 1st Air Depot; Colombey-les-Belles Aerodrome; Demobilized: July 1919
283d Aero Squadron	June 1918	Instructional flying squadron Re-designated:Squadron C, Mather Field, California, July 1918; Demobilized: November 1918
284th Aero Squadron	February 1918	Instructional flying squadron Re-designated:Squadron E, Carlstrom Field, Florida, July 1918; Demobilized: November 1918
285th Aero Squadron	March 1918	Instructional flying squadron Re-designated:Squadron H, Ellington Field, Texas, July 1918; Demobilized: November 1918
286th Aero Squadron	March 1918	Instructional flying squadron Re-designated:Squadron T, Ellington Field, Texas, July 1918; Demobilized: November 1918
287th Aero Squadron	April 1918	Service Squadron at Wilbur Wright Field, Ohio, May 1918. Transferred to Chanute Field, Illinois, June 1918 and re-designated "Squadron D", July 1918. Re-designated 287th Aero Squadron and transferred to Aviation General Supply Depot Americus, Georgia, December 1918
287th Aero Squadron	Depot was established in March 1918 as a general supply depot. The 112th and 287th Aero Squadrons were consolidated into "Aviation Supply Depot Detachment" 1 January 1919.	
288th Aero Squadron	June 1918	Instructional flying squadron Re-designated:Squadron E, Chanute Field, Illinois, July 1918; Demobilized: November 1918
289th Aero Squadron	June 1918	Transferred from Rockwell Field, California; Instructional flying squadron Re-designated:Squadron C, March Field, California, July 1918; Demobilized: November 1918
290th Aero Squadron	April 1918	Instructional flying squadron Re-designated:Squadron F, Rockwell Field, California, July 1918; Demobilized: November 1918
291st Aero Squadron	April 1918	Instructional flying squadron Re-designated:Squadron G, Rockwell Field, California, July 1918; Demobilized: November 1918
292d Aero Squadron	April 1918	Instructional flying squadron Re-designated:Squadron H, Rockwell Field, California, July 1918; Demobilized: November 1918
293d Aero Squadron	June 1918	Instructional flying squadron Re-designated:Squadron D, March Field, California, July 1918; Demobilized: November 1918
294th Aero Squadron	June 1918	Instructional flying squadron Re-designated:Squadron D, Mather Field, California, July 1918; Demobilized: November 1918

=== 300th to 324th Aero Squadrons ===
Aero Squadron	Established	World War I
Aero Squadron	Notes/Subsequent History	
302d Aero Squadron	June 1918	Organized as the 302d Aero Squadron (Service) at Carlstrom Field, Florida; Re-designated, Squadron "F", Carlstrom Field; Demobilized: December 1918
302d Aero Squadron	Constituted in the Organized Reserve (New York) as the 302d Observation Squadron on 24 June 1921; Consolidated on 24 November 1936, with the 302d Aero Squadron; Disbanded on 31 May 1942	
303d Aero Squadron	May 1918	Organized as the 303d Aero Squadron (Provisional) at Ellington Field, Texas; Re-designated 303d Aero Squadron (Service), June 1918; Squadron "K", Ellington Field, July 1918; Demobilized: December 1918
303d Aero Squadron	Constituted in the Organized Reserve (New Jersey) as the 303d Observation Squadron on 24 June 1921; Col. Charles A. Lindbergh, Air Corps Reserve, was attached to the squadron in June 1932 for summer training at Mitchel Field, New York; consolidated on 24 November 1936, with the 303d Aero Squadron; Inactivated in August 1937; disbanded on 31 May 1942	
306th Aero Squadron	July 1918	Organized as the 306th Aero Squadron (Service) at Camp Greene, North Carolina; AEF: July 1918 – December 1918; Demobilized: December 1918
306th Aero Squadron	Constituted in the Organized Reserve (Tennessee) as the 306th Observation Squadron on 24 June 1921; Consolidated on 24 November 1936, with the 306th Aero Squadron; Inactivated on 23 July 1939; disbanded on 31 May 1942	
307th Aero Squadron	July 1918	Organized as the 307th Aero Squadron (Service) at Camp Greene, North Carolina; AEF: July 1918 – December 1918; Demobilized: December 1918
307th Aero Squadron	Constituted in the Organized Reserve (Georgia) as the 307th Observation Squadron on 24 June 1921; Consolidated on 24 November 1936, with the 307th Aero Squadron; Inactivated on 27 August 1939; disbanded on 31 May 1942	
308th Aero Squadron	July 1918	Organized as the 308th Aero Squadron (Service) at Camp Greene, North Carolina; AEF: July 1918 – December 1918; Demobilized: December 1918
308th Aero Squadron	Constituted in the Organized Reserve (Ohio) as the 308th Observation Squadron on 24 June 1921; The squadron was one of a few in the Organized Reserve that possessed facilities, equipment, and aircraft; Consolidated on 24 November 1936, with the 308th Aero Squadron; Disbanded on 31 May 1942	
309th Aero Squadron	7 July 1919	AEF: 11 August 1918– December 1918; Service support squadron In training in England entire time Demobilized: December 1918
309th Aero Squadron	Constituted in the Organized Reserve (Ohio) as the 309th Observation Squadron on 15 October 1921; The squadron was one of a few in the Organized Reserve that possessed facilities, equipment, and aircraft. Squadron commander in the late 1920s was World War I ace Major H. Weir Cook; Consolidated on 24 November 1936, with the 309th Aero Squadron; Disbanded on 31 May 1942	
310th Aero Squadron	July 1918	Organized as the 310th Aero Squadron (Service) at Camp Greene, North Carolina; AEF: July 1918 – December 1918; Demobilized: December 1918
310th Aero Squadron	Constituted in the Organized Reserve (Michigan) as the 310th Observation Squadron on 24 June 1921; Consolidated on 24 November 1936, with the 310th Aero Squadron; Disbanded on 31 May 1942	
311th Aero Squadron	June 1918	Instructional flying squadron Re-designated:Squadron E, March Field, California, July 1918; Demobilized: November 1918
311th Aero Squadron	Constituted in the Organized Reserve (Illinois) as the 311th Observation Squadron on 15 October 1921; Consolidated on 24 November 1936, with the 311th Aero Squadron; Disbanded on 31 May 1942	
312th Aero Squadron	July 1918	Organized as the 312th Aero Squadron (Service) at Bolling Field, District of Columbia; Demobilized: September 1919
312th Aero Squadron	Constituted in the Organized Reserve (Alabama) as the 312th Observation Squadron on 24 June 1921; Consolidated on 24 November 1936, with the 312th Aero Squadron; Disbanded on 31 May 1942	
313th Aero Squadron	June 1918	Organized as the 313th Aero Squadron (Service) at Kelly Field, Texas; Demobilized: August 1919
313th Aero Squadron	Constituted in the Organized Reserve (Iowa) as the 313th Observation Squadron on 24 June 1921; 1st Lt. Charles Lindbergh was a member of the squadron from June to November 1925; Consolidated on 24 November 1936, with the 313th Aero Squadron; Inactivated on 2 October 1939; disbanded on 31 May 1942	
314th Aero Squadron	July 1918	Organized as the 314th Aero Squadron (Service) at Aviation Concentration Center, Garden City, New York; AEF: July 1918 – December 1918; Demobilized: December 1918
314th Aero Squadron	Constituted in the Organized Reserve (Nebraska) as the 314th Observation Squadron on 24 June 1921; The squadron was one of a few in the Organized Reserve that possessed facilities, equipment, and aircraft. Part of 89th Division. The squadron's equipment was stationed at Offut Field, Nebraska; Consolidated on 24 November 1936, with the 314th Aero Squadron; Inactivated on 2 October 1939; disbanded on 31 May 1942	
315th Aero Squadron	July 1918	Organized as the 315th Aero Squadron (Service) at Aviation Concentration Center, Garden City, New York; AEF: July 1918 – December 1918; Demobilized: December 1918
315th Aero Squadron	Constituted in the Organized Reserve (Texas) as the 315th Observation Squadron on 24 June 1921; The squadron was one of a few in the Organized Reserve that possessed facilities, equipment, and aircraft; Consolidated on 24 November 1936, with the 315th Aero Squadron; Disbanded on 31 May 1942	
316th Aero Squadron	July 1918	Organized as the 316th Aero Squadron (Service) at Aviation Concentration Center, Garden City, New York; AEF: July 1918 – December 1918; Demobilized: December 1918
316th Aero Squadron	Constituted in the Organized Reserve (California) as the 316th Observation Squadron on 24 June 1921; The squadron was one of a few in the Organized Reserve that possessed facilities, equipment, and aircraft. In January 1922 the squadron received the use of a hangar at Crissy Field and was issued five aircraft for training purposes making it the first aircraft equipped reserve squadron in the United States; Consolidated on 24 November 1936, with the 316th Aero Squadron; Inactivated on 1 September 1940; disbanded on 31 May 1942	
319th Aero Squadron	July 1918	Organized as the 319th Aero Squadron (Service) at Camp Morrison, Virginia; AEF: July 1918 – December 1918; Demobilized: December 1918
319th Aero Squadron	Constituted in the Organized Reserve (Massachusetts) as the 319th Observation Squadron on 24 June 1921; The squadron was one of a few in the Organized Reserve that possessed facilities, equipment, and aircraft. Stationed initially at the Framingham Airdrome. The squadron's aircraft were transferred to the Boston Airport after its opening in 1923; Consolidated on 18 November 1936, with the 319th Aero Squadron; Disbanded on 31 May 1942	
320th Aero Squadron	July 1918	Organized as the 320th Aero Squadron (Service) at Camp Morrison, Virginia; AEF: July 1918 – December 1918; Demobilized: December 1918
320th Aero Squadron	Constituted in the Organized Reserve (Oklahoma) as the 320th Observation Squadron on 24 June 1921; Consolidated on 24 November 1936, with the 320th Aero Squadron; Disbanded on 31 May 1942	
321st Aero Squadron	July 1918	Organized as the 321st Aero Squadron (Service) at Camp Morrison, Virginia; AEF: July 1918 – December 1918; Demobilized: December 1918
321st Aero Squadron	Constituted in the Organized Reserve (Oregon) as the 321st Observation Squadron on 24 June 1921; The squadron was one of a few in the Organized Reserve that possessed facilities, equipment, and aircraft. The squadron's equipment was stationed just across the Columbia River at Pearson Field, Vancouver Barracks, Washington. 1st Lt. Oakley Kelly, Air Service Reserve, a pilot who made the first non-stop transcontinental flight in 1923, was the unit instructor 1924–28; Consolidated on 12 August 1933, with the 321st Aero Squadron; Inactivated on 30 January 1942; disbanded on 31 May 1942	
322d Aero Squadron	February 1918	Aviation General Supply Depot squadron Kelly Field, Texas. Demobilized: February 1919
322d Aero Squadron	Constituted in the Organized Reserve (New Hampshire) as the 322d Observation Squadron on 15 October 1921; Consolidated on 23 November 1936, with the 322d Aero Squadron; Disbanded on 31 May 1942	
323d Aero Squadron	December 1917	Organized as the 323d Aero Squadron (Service) at Kelly Field, Texas; Demobilized: August 1919
323d Aero Squadron	Constituted in the Organized Reserve (New York) as the 323d Observation Squadron on 24 June 1921; Consolidated on 24 November 1936, with the 323d Aero Squadron; Disbanded on 31 May 1942	
324th Aero Squadron	February 1918	Aviation General Supply Depot squadron Kelly Field, Texas. Demobilized: August 1919
324th Aero Squadron	Constituted in the Organized Reserve (Pennsylvania) as the 324th Observation Squadron on 15 October 1921; Consolidated on 23 November 1936, with the 324th Aero Squadron; Inactivated on 23 October 1939, by relief of personnel; disbanded on 31 May 1942	

=== 325th to 349th Aero Squadrons ===
Aero Squadron	Established	World War I
Aero Squadron	Notes/Subsequent History	
325th Aero Squadron	December 1917	Organized as the 325th Aero Squadron (Service) at Kelly Field, Texas; Re-designated 869th Aero Squadron (Repair), April 1918; Demobilized: December 1918
325th Aero Squadron	Constituted in the Organized Reserve (Ohio) as the 325th Observation Squadron on 24 June 1921; Consolidated on 19 November 1931, with the 325th Aero Squadron; Disbanded on 31 May 1942	
327th Aero Squadron	November 1917	Aviation General Supply Depot squadron Kelly Field, Texas. Demobilized: August 1919
327th Aero Squadron	Constituted in the Organized Reserve (Arkansas) as the 327th Observation Squadron on 15 October 1921; Consolidated on 23 November 1936, with the 327th Aero Squadron; Inactivated on 2 October 1939, by relief of personnel; disbanded on 31 May 1942	
328th Aero Squadron	November 1917	Aviation General Supply Depot squadron Kelly Field, Texas. Demobilized: August 1919
328th Aero Squadron	Constituted in the Organized Reserve (Colorado) as the 328th Observation Squadron on 15 October 1921; Consolidated on 21 November 1936, with the 328th Aero Squadron; Disbanded on 31 May 1942	
329th Aero Squadron	July 1918	Organized as the 329th Aero Squadron (Service) at Camp Morrison, Virginia; AEF: July 1918 – December 1918; Demobilized: December 1918
329th Aero Squadron	Constituted in the Organized Reserve (Utah) as the 329th Observation Squadron on 24 June 1921; Consolidated on 24 November 1936, with the 329th Aero Squadron; Disbanded on 31 May 1942	
332d Aero Squadron	December 1917	Organized as the 332d Aero Squadron (Supply) at Kelly Field, Texas; Re-designated: 670th Aero Squadron (Supply), February 1918; assigned to Camp Morrison, Virginia; Demobilized: December 1918
332d Aero Squadron	Constituted in the Organized Reserve (New York) as Air Park No. 332 on 15 October 1921; Re-designated 332d Service Squadron, 2 July 1923; Consolidated on 21 November 1936, with the 332d Aero Squadron; Disbanded on 31 May 1942	
333d Aero Squadron	December 1917	Organized as the 333d Aero Squadron (Supply) at Kelly Field, Texas; Re-designated: 671st Aero Squadron (Supply), February 1918; assigned to Camp Morrison, Virginia; Demobilized: December 1918
333d Aero Squadron	Constituted in the Organized Reserve (New York) as Air Park No. 333 on 15 October 1921; Re-designated 333d Service Squadron, 2 July 1923; Consolidated on 21 November 1936, with the 333d Aero Squadron; Disbanded on 31 May 1942	
335th Aero Squadron	December 1917	Organized as the 335th Aero Squadron (Supply) at Kelly Field, Texas; Re-designated: 673d Aero Squadron (Supply), February 1918; assigned to Camp Morrison, Virginia; Demobilized: December 1918
335th Aero Squadron	Constituted in the Organized Reserve (Pennsylvania) as Air Park No. 335 on 15 October 1921; Re-designated 335th Service Squadron, 2 July 1923; Consolidated on 21 November 1936, with the 335th Aero Squadron; Inactivated about September 1939; disbanded on 31 May 1942	
336th Aero Squadron	December 1917	Organized as the 336th Aero Squadron (Supply) at Kelly Field, Texas; Re-designated: 674th Aero Squadron (Supply), February 1918; assigned to Camp Morrison, Virginia; Demobilized: December 1919
336th Aero Squadron	Constituted in the Organized Reserve (Ohio) as Air Park No. 336 on 15 October 1921; Re-designated 336th Service Squadron, 2 July 1923; Consolidated on 21 November 1936, with the 336th Aero Squadron; Inactivated by March 1930; disbanded on 31 May 1942	
337th Aero Squadron	December 1917	Organized as the 337th Aero Squadron (Supply) at Kelly Field, Texas; Re-designated: 675th Aero Squadron (Supply), February 1918; assigned to Aviation General Supply Depot, San Antonio, Texas; Demobilized: April 1919
337th Aero Squadron	Constituted in the Organized Reserve (Illinois) as Air Park No. 337 on 15 October 1921; Re-designated 337th Service Squadron, 2 July 1923; Consolidated on 21 November 1936, with the 339th Aero Squadron; Disbanded on 31 May 1942	
338th Aero Squadron	July 1918	Organized as the 338th Aero Squadron (Supply) at Camp Morrison, Virginia; AEF: July 1918 – December 1918; Demobilized: December 1918
338th Aero Squadron	Constituted in the Organized Reserve (Illinois) as Air Park No. 339 on 15 October 1921; Re-designated 338th Service Squadron, 2 July 1923; Consolidated on 24 November 1936, with the 339th Aero Squadron; Disbanded on 31 May 1942	
341st Aero Squadron	7 July 1918	AEF: 30 July 1918 – March 1919; Service support squadron Aerial Gunnery School, St. Jean-de-monts Aerodrome; Demobilized: April 1919
341st Aero Squadron	Constituted in the Organized Reserve (Texas) as Air Park No. 341 on 15 October 1921; Re-designated 341st Service Squadron, 2 July 1923; Consolidated on 24 November 1936, with the 341st Aero Squadron; Inactivated on 16 January 1941; disbanded on 31 May 1942	
342d Aero Squadron	July 1917	Instructional flying squadron Re-designated:Squadron M (later Q), Wilbur Wright Field, Ohio, July 1918; Demobilized: November 1918
344th Aero Squadron	September 1918	Organized as the 344th Aero Squadron (Service) at Aviation Concentration Center, Garden City, New York; Assigned to the Handley Page bomber project Demobilized: December 1918
344th Aero Squadron	Constituted in the Organized Reserve (Illinois) as Air Park No. 344 on 15 October 1921; Re-designated 344th Service Squadron, 2 July 1923; Consolidated on 24 November 1936, with the 344th Aero Squadron; Disbanded on 31 May 1942	
346th Aero Squadron	September 1918	Organized as the 346th Aero Squadron (Service) at Aviation Concentration Center, Garden City, New York; Assigned to the Handley Page bomber project Demobilized: December 1918
346th Aero Squadron	Constituted in the Organized Reserve (New York) as Air Park No. 346 on 15 October 1921; Re-designated 346th Service Squadron, 2 July 1923; Consolidated on 24 November 1936, with the 346th Aero Squadron; Disbanded on 31 May 1942	
349th Aero Squadron	January 1918	Organized as the 367th Aero Squadron (Service) at Kelly Field, Texas; AEF:May 1918 – December 1918; Demobilized: January 1919
349th Aero Squadron	Constituted in the Organized Reserve (Illinois) as Air Park No. 349 on 15 October 1921; Re-designated 349th Service Squadron, Transport Group, 1 October 1933; Consolidated on 24 November 1936, with the 349th Aero Squadron; Disbanded on 31 May 1942	

=== 350th to 399th Aero Squadrons ===
Aero Squadron	Established	World War I
Aero Squadron	Notes/Subsequent History	
350th Aero Squadron	12 January 1918	AEF: 30 July 1918 – December 1918; Service support squadron In training in England entire time Demobilized: December 1918
350th Aero Squadron	Constituted in the Organized Reserve (Oklahoma) as the 350th Service Squadron on 15 October 1921; Consolidated on 24 November 1936, with the 350th Aero Squadron; Disbanded on 31 May 1942	
351st Aero Squadron	24 January 1918	AEF: 26 August 1918 – April 1919; Service support squadron 4th Aerial Artillery Observation School, Camp de Coetquidan; Demobilized: April 1919
351st Aero Squadron	Constituted in the Organized Reserve (Massachusetts) as the 351st Observation Squadron on 15 October 1921; Consolidated on 24 November 1936, with the 351st Aero Squadron; Disbanded on 31 May 1942	
353d Aero Squadron	14 January 1918	AEF: 26 August 1918– May 1919; Service support squadron 2d Aerial Artillery Observation School, Bordeaux; Demobilized: May 1919
353d Aero Squadron	Constituted in the Organized Reserve (New York) as the 353d Observation Squadron on 15 October 1921; Consolidated on 24 November 1936, with the 353d Aero Squadron; Disbanded on 31 May 1942	
354th Aero Squadron	28 January 1918	AEF: 25 August 1918 – July 1919; Corps Observation; Assigned to the VI Corps Observation Group (Did not see combat) Demobilized: 30 July 1919
357th Aero Squadron	February 1918	Organized as the 357th Aero Squadron (Service) at Kelly Field, Texas; Assigned to Hazelhurst Field, New York, March 1918 – January 1919 Demobilized: January 1919
357th Aero Squadron	Constituted in the Organized Reserve (Alabama) as the 357th Observation Squadron on 15 October 1921; Consolidated on 24 November 1936, with the 357th Aero Squadron; Disbanded on 31 May 1942	
358th Aero Squadron	February 1918	Organized as the 358th Aero Squadron (Service) at Kelly Field, Texas; Assigned to Roosevelt Field, New York, March 1918 – January 1919 Demobilized: January 1919
358th Aero Squadron	Constituted in the Organized Reserve (South Carolina) as the 358th Observation Squadron on 15 October 1921; Consolidated on 24 November 1936, with the 358th Aero Squadron; Disbanded on 31 May 1942	
359th Aero Squadron	February 1918	Organized as the 359th Aero Squadron (Service) at Kelly Field, Texas; Assigned to several stations in the United States, March 1918 – January 1919 Demobilized: January 1919
359th Aero Squadron	Constituted in the Organized Reserve (Ohio) as the 359th Observation Squadron on 15 October 1921; Consolidated on 24 November 1936, with the 359th Aero Squadron; Disbanded on 31 May 1942	
360th Aero Squadron	January 1918	AEF: June 1918 – December 1918; Re-designated: 2d Air Park; 3d Pursuit Group; Aircraft/Vehicle maintenance and supply unit Demobilized: December 1918
365th Aero Squadron	January 1918	Organized as the 365th Aero Squadron (Depot) at Central Depot Headquarters, Chicago, Illinois; Re-designated 816th Aero Squadron (Depot), February 1918. Demobilized: August 1918
365th Aero Squadron	Constituted in the Organized Reserve (Oklahoma) as the 365th Observation Squadron on 15 October 1921; Consolidated on 28 November 1936, with the 365th Aero Squadron; Inactivated on 31 October 1936; disbanded on 31 May 1942	
366th Aero Squadron	January 1918	Organized as the 366th Aero Squadron (Depot) at Fort Sill, Oklahoma; Re-designated 817th Aero Squadron (Depot), February 1918. Demobilized: August 1918
366th Aero Squadron	Constituted in the Organized Reserve (Texas) as the 366th Observation Squadron on 15 October 1921; Consolidated on 28 November 1936, with the 366th Aero Squadron; Inactivated on 31 October 1936; disbanded on 31 May 1942	
367th Aero Squadron	January 1918	Organized as the 367th Aero Squadron (Depot) at Western Depot Headquarters, San Francisco, California; Re-designated 818th Aero Squadron (Depot), February 1918. Demobilized: August 1918
367th Aero Squadron	Constituted in the Organized Reserve (California) as the 367th Observation Squadron on 15 October 1921; Consolidated on 28 November 1936, with the 367th Aero Squadron; The squadron was one of a few in the Organized Reserve that possessed facilities, equipment, and aircraft.; Inactivated on 2 September 1937; disbanded on 31 May 1942	
368th Aero Squadron	January 1918	Organized as the 368th Aero Squadron (Depot) at Langley Field, Virginia; Re-designated: Detachment #17, Air Service Production Squadron, August 1918; Demobilized: January 1919
369th Aero Squadron	31 December 1917	AEF: 5 March 1918 – June 1918; Service support squadron 3d Air Instructional Center, Issoudun Aerodrome; Demobilized: June 1919
369th Aero Squadron	Constituted in the Organized Reserve (New York) as the 369th Observation Squadron on 15 October 1921; Re-designated 374th Service Squadron, 25 January 1923; Consolidated on 27 November 1936, with 27 November 1936; Disbanded on 31 May 1942	
370th Aero Squadron	15 January 1918	AEF: 6 March 1918 – June 1919; Aerial Observation Squadron (Training); Second Corps Observation Aeronautical School, Chatillion-sur-Seine Aerodrome; Demobilized June 1919
372d Aero Squadron	17 January 1918	AEF: 18 March 1918 – May 1919; Service support squadron 3d Air Instructional Center, Issoudun Aerodrome; Demobilized: May 1919
373d Aero Squadron	19 January 1918	AEF: 18 March 1918– May 1919; Service support squadron 3d Air Instructional Center, Issoudun Aerodrome; Demobilized: May 1919
373d Aero Squadron	Constituted in the Organized Reserve (California) as Air Park No. 373 on 15 October 1921; Re-designated 373d Service Squadron, 25 January 1923; Consolidated on 27 November 1936, with the 373d Aero Squadron; Inactivated on 2 March 1937; disbanded on 31 May 1942	
374th Aero Squadron	28 December 1917	AEF: 18 March 1918– May 1919; Service support squadron 3d Air Instructional Center, Issoudun Aerodrome; Demobilized: May 1919
374th Aero Squadron	Constituted in the Organized Reserve (California) as Air Park No. 374 on 15 October 1921; Re-designated 374th Service Squadron, 25 January 1923; Consolidated on 27 November 1936, with the 374th Aero Squadron; Inactivated on 1 September 1928; disbanded on 31 May 1942	
375th Aero Squadron	20 January 1918	AEF: 18 March 1918– May 1919; Service support squadron 3d Air Instructional Center, Issoudun Aerodrome; Demobilized: May 1919
376th Aero Squadron	1 January 1918	AEF: 18 March 1918– May 1919; Service support squadron 3d Air Instructional Center, Issoudun Aerodrome; Demobilized: May 1919
377th Aero Squadron	January 1918	Organized as the 377th Aero Squadron (Service) at Rich Field, Waco, Texas; AEF: March 1918 – December 1918; Demobilized: December 1918
377th Aero Squadron	Constituted in the Organized Reserve (Indiana) as Air Park No. 305 on 15 October 1921; Re-designated as the 377th Service Squadron on 25 January 1923; Consolidated on 27 November 1936, with the 377th Aero Squadron; Inactivated on 1 December 1929; disbanded on 31 May 1942	
378th Aero Squadron	January 1918	Organized as the 378th Aero Squadron (Service) at Rich Field, Waco, Texas; AEF: March 1918 – December 1918; Demobilized: December 1918
378th Aero Squadron	Constituted in the Organized Reserve (Illinois) as Air Park No. 306 on 15 October 1921; Re-designated as the 378th Service Squadron on 25 January 1923; Consolidated on 27 November 1936, with the 378th Aero Squadron Inactivated by 7 December 1941; disbanded on 31 May 1942	
379th Aero Squadron	April 1918	Instructional flying squadron Re-designated:Squadron E, Benbrook Field, Texas, July 1918; Demobilized: November 1918
379th Aero Squadron	Constituted in the Organized Reserve (Nebraska) as Air Park No. 307 on 15 October 1921; Re-designated 379th Service Squadron, Attack Group, 1 October 1933; Consolidated on 28 November 1936, with the 379th Aero Squadron; Disbanded on 31 May 1942	
380th Aero Squadron	January 1918	Instructional flying squadron Re-designated:Squadron B, Selfridge Field, Michigan, July 1918; Demobilized: November 1918
380th Aero Squadron	Constituted in the Organized Reserve (Texas) as Air Park No. 308 on 15 October 1921; Re-designated 380th Service Squadron, Observation Group, 1 October 1933; Consolidated on 28 November 1936, with the 380th Aero Squadron; Inactivated on 31 October 1936; disbanded on 31 May 1942	

=== 400th to 449th Aero Squadrons ===
Aero Squadron	Established	World War I
Aero Squadron	Notes/Subsequent History	
400th Aero Squadron	23 May 1917	Formed as 29th Aero Squadron (Prov); AEF: 28 July 1917 – July 1919; Construction Squadron; 3d Aviation Instruction Center; Issoudun Aerodrome; Demobilized: July 1919
400th Aero Squadron	Notable as the first American Air Service Squadron to arrive in France; Constituted in the Organized Reserve (New York) as the 400th Attack Squadron on 15 October 1921; Consolidated on 27 November 1936, with the 400th Aero Squadron; Disbanded on 31 May 1942	
401st Aero Squadron	November 1917	Organized as the 401st Aero Squadron (Construction) at Vancouver Barracks, Washington; Re-designated 15th Spruce Squadron, July 1918 Assigned to Spruce Production Division; Demobilized: January 1919
401st Aero Squadron	Constituted in the Organized Reserve (New York) as the 401st Attack Squadron on 15 October 1921; Consolidated on 27 November 1936, with the 401st Aero Squadron; Inactivated on 18 September 1930; disbanded on 31 May 1942	
402d Aero Squadron	November 1917	Organized as the 402d Aero Squadron (Construction) at Vancouver Barracks, Washington; Re-designated 16th Spruce Squadron, July 1918 Assigned to Spruce Production Division; Demobilized: January 1919
402d Aero Squadron	Constituted in the Organized Reserve (New York) as the 402d Attack Squadron on 15 October 1921; Consolidated on 27 November 1936, with the 402d Aero Squadron; Inactivated on 5 December 1929; disbanded on 31 May 1942	
403d Aero Squadron	November 1917	Organized as the 403rd Aero Squadron (Construction) at Vancouver Barracks, Washington; Re-designated 17th Spruce Squadron, July 1918 Assigned to Spruce Production Division; Demobilized: January 1919
403d Aero Squadron	Constituted in the Organized Reserve (Pennsylvania) 15 October 1921; Consolidated on 23 November 1936, with 403d Airdrome Company; Disbanded 31 May 1942	
404th Aero Squadron	November 1917	Organized as the 404th Aero Squadron (Construction) at Vancouver Barracks, Washington; Re-designated 18th Spruce Squadron, July 1918 Assigned to Spruce Production Division; Demobilized: January 1919
404th Aero Squadron	Constituted in the Organized Reserve (Pennsylvania) as the 404th Pursuit Squadron on 15 October 1921; Consolidated on 30 November 1936, with the 404th Aero Squadron; Inactivated by June 1940; disbanded on 31 May 1942	
405th Aero Squadron	November 1917	Organized as the 405th Aero Squadron (Construction) at Vancouver Barracks, Washington; Re-designated 19th Spruce Squadron, July 1918 Assigned to Spruce Production Division; Demobilized: January 1919
405th Aero Squadron	Constituted in the Organized Reserve (Pennsylvania) as the 405th Pursuit Squadron on 15 October 1921; Consolidated on 30 November 1936, with the 405th Aero Squadron; Disbanded on 31 May 1942	
406th Aero Squadron	November 1917	Organized as the 406th Aero Squadron (Construction) at Vancouver Barracks, Washington; Re-designated 20th Spruce Squadron, July 1918 Assigned to Spruce Production Division; Demobilized: January 1919
406th Aero Squadron	Constituted in the Organized Reserve (Pennsylvania) as the 406th Pursuit Squadron on 15 October 1921; Reorganized and re-designated 406th Attack Squadron on 1 October 1933; Consolidated on 30 November 1936, with the 406th Aero Squadron; Inactivated by June 1940; disbanded on 31 May 1942	
407th Aero Squadron	November 1917	Organized as the 407th Aero Squadron (Construction) at Vancouver Barracks, Washington; Re-designated 1st Spruce Squadron, July 1918 Assigned to Spruce Production Division; Demobilized: January 1919
407th Aero Squadron	Constituted in the Organized Reserve (Pennsylvania) as the 407th Attack Squadron on 15 October 1921; Consolidated on 5 December 1936, with the 407th Aero Squadron; Inactivated on 25 July 1929; disbanded on 31 May 1942	
408th Aero Squadron	November 1917	Organized as the 408th Aero Squadron (Construction) at Vancouver Barracks, Washington; Re-designated 2d Spruce Squadron, July 1918 Assigned to Spruce Production Division; Demobilized: January 1919
408th Aero Squadron	Constituted in the Organized Reserve (Pennsylvania) as the 408th Attack Squadron on 15 October 1921; Consolidated on 5 December 1936, with the 408th Aero Squadron; Disbanded on 31 May 1942	
409th Aero Squadron	November 1917	Organized as the 409th Aero Squadron (Construction) at Vancouver Barracks, Washington; Re-designated 3d Spruce Squadron, July 1918 Assigned to Spruce Production Division; Demobilized: January 1919
409th Aero Squadron	Constituted in the Organized Reserve (Pennsylvania) as the 409th Attack Squadron on 15 October 1921; Consolidated on 30 November 1936, with the 409th Aero Squadron; Disbanded on 31 May 1942	
410th Aero Squadron	November 1917	Organized as the 412th Aero Squadron (Construction) at Vancouver Barracks, Washington; Re-designated 4th Spruce Squadron, July 1918 Assigned to Spruce Production Division; Demobilized: January 1919
410th Aero Squadron	Constituted in the Organized Reserve (Pennsylvania) as the 410th Attack Squadron on 15 October 1921; Consolidated on 30 November 1936, with the 410th Aero Squadron; Inactivated on 23 July 1929; disbanded on 31 May 1942	
411th Aero Squadron	November 1917	Re-designated 5th Spruce Squadron, July 1918 Assigned to Spruce Production Division; Demobilized: January 1919
411th Aero Squadron	Constituted in the Organized Reserve (New York) as the 411th Airdrome Company 15 October 1921; Consolidated on 23 November 1936, with 411th Aero Squadron; Disbanded 31 May 1942	
412th Aero Squadron	November 1917	Organized as the 412th Aero Squadron (Construction) at Vancouver Barracks, Washington; Re-designated 6th Spruce Squadron, Aberdeen, Washington, July 1918; Transferred to Vancouver Barracks, November 1918 Assigned to Spruce Production Division; Demobilized: January 1919
412th Aero Squadron	Constituted in the Organized Reserve (Mississippi) as the 412th Pursuit Squadron on 15 October 1921; Consolidated on 28 November 1936, with the 412th Aero Squadron; Inactivated on 19 September 1929; disbanded on 31 May 1942	
413th Aero Squadron	December 1917	Organized as 413th Aero Squadron (Construction), Vancouver Barracks, Washington; Re-designated 42d Spruce Squadron and transferred to Aberdeen, Washington, July 1918 Assigned to Spruce Production Division; Demobilized: January 1919
413th Aero Squadron	Constituted in the Organized Reserve (Pennsylvania) 15 October 1921, as the 413th Airdrome Company; Consolidated on 23 November 1936, with 413th Aero Squadron; Disbanded 31 May 1942	
414th Aero Squadron	December 1917	Organized as the 414th Aero Squadron (Construction) at Vancouver Barracks, Washington; Re-designated 102d Spruce Squadron, Powers, Oregon, July 1918; Transferred to Vancouver Barracks, November 1918 Assigned to Spruce Production Division; Demobilized: January 1919
414th Aero Squadron	Constituted in the Organized Reserve (Ohio) as the 414th Pursuit Squadron on 15 October 1921; Consolidated on 28 November 1936, with the 414th Aero Squadron; Inactivated about June 1937; disbanded on 31 May 1942	
415th Aero Squadron	December 1917	Organized as 415th Aero Squadron (Construction), Vancouver Barracks, Washington; Re-designated 32d Spruce Squadron and transferred to Twin, Washington, July 1918 Assigned to Spruce Production Division; Demobilized: January 1919
415th Aero Squadron	Constituted in the Organized Reserve (Ohio) 15 October 1921, as the 415th Airdrome Company; Consolidated on 23 November 1936, with 415th Aero Squadron; Disbanded 31 May 1942	
416th Aero Squadron	December 1917	Organized as 416th Aero Squadron (Construction), Vancouver Barracks, Washington; Re-designated 33d Spruce Squadron and transferred to Stillwater, Washington, July 1918 Assigned to Spruce Production Division; Demobilized: January 1919
416th Aero Squadron	Constituted in the Organized Reserve (Ohio) 15 October 1921, as the 416th Airdrome Company; Consolidated on 23 November 1936, with 416th Aero Squadron; Disbanded 31 May 1942	
417th Aero Squadron	December 1917	Organized as 417th Aero Squadron (Construction), Vancouver Barracks, Washington; Re-designated 34th Spruce Squadron and transferred to Pysht, Washington, July 1918 Assigned to Spruce Production Division; Demobilized: January 1919
417th Aero Squadron	Constituted in the Organized Reserve (Wisconsin) 15 October 1921, as the 417th Airdrome Company; Consolidated on 23 November 1936, with 417th Aero Squadron; Disbanded 31 May 1942	
418th Aero Squadron	January 1918	Organized as 418th Aero Squadron (Construction), Vancouver Barracks, Washington; Re-designated 35th Spruce Squadron and transferred to Arlington, Washington, July 1918 Assigned to Spruce Production Division; Demobilized: January 1919
418th Aero Squadron	Constituted in the Organized Reserve (Arkansas) 15 October 1921, as the 418th Airdrome Company; Consolidated on 23 November 1936, with 418th Aero Squadron; Disbanded 31 May 1942	
419th Aero Squadron	March 1918	Organized as 419th Aero Squadron (Construction), Vancouver Barracks, Washington; Re-designated 43d Spruce Squadron and transferred to Lindburg, Washington, July 1918 Assigned to Spruce Production Division; Demobilized: January 1919
419th Aero Squadron	Constituted in the Organized Reserve (New York) 15 October 1921, as the 419th Airdrome Company; Consolidated on 23 November 1936, with 419th Aero Squadron; Disbanded 31 May 1942	
420th Aero Squadron	January 1918	Organized as 420th Aero Squadron (Construction), Vancouver Barracks, Washington; Re-designated 44th Spruce Squadron and transferred to Hoquiam, Washington, July 1918 Assigned to Spruce Production Division; Demobilized: January 1919
420th Aero Squadron	Constituted in the Organized Reserve (Kentucky) 15 October 1921, as the 420th Airdrome Company; Consolidated on 23 November 1936, with 420th Aero Squadron; Disbanded 31 May 1942	
421st Aero Squadron	January 1918	Organized as the 421st Aero Squadron (Construction) at Vancouver Barracks, Washington; Re-designated 45th Spruce Squadron, Carlisle, Washington, July 1918; Transferred to Vancouver Barracks, November 1918 Assigned to Spruce Production Division; Demobilized: January 1919
421st Aero Squadron	Constituted in the Organized Reserve (Illinois) as the 421st Pursuit Squadron on 15 October 1921; Consolidated on 2 December 1936, with the 421st Aero Squadron; Disbanded on 31 May 1942	
422d Aero Squadron	January 1918	Organized as the 422d Aero Squadron (Construction) at Vancouver Barracks, Washington; Re-designated 36th Spruce Squadron, Blyn, Washington, July 1918; Transferred to Vancouver Barracks, November 1918 Assigned to Spruce Production Division; Demobilized: January 1919
422d Aero Squadron	Constituted in the Organized Reserve (Wisconsin) as the 422d Pursuit Squadron on 15 October 1921; Consolidated on 2 December 1936, with the 422d Aero Squadron; Disbanded on 31 May 1942	
423d Aero Squadron	January 1918	Organized as the 423d Aero Squadron (Construction) at Vancouver Barracks, Washington; Re-designated 46th Spruce Squadron, Bay City, Washington, July 1918; Transferred to Vancouver Barracks, November 1918 Assigned to Spruce Production Division; Demobilized: January 1919
423d Aero Squadron	Constituted in the Organized Reserve (Illinois) as the 423d Pursuit Squadron on 15 October 1921; Reorganized and re-designated 423d Attack Squadron on 1 October 1933; Consolidated on 2 December 1936, with the 423d Aero Squadron; Disbanded on 31 May 1942	
424th Aero Squadron	January 1918	Organized as 424th Aero Squadron at Vancouver Barracks, Washington; Re-designated 66th Spruce Squadron, July 1918 transferred to Blind Slough, Oregon Assigned to Spruce Production Division; Demobilized: January 1919
425th Aero Squadron	December 1917	Organized as the 425th Aero Squadron (Construction) at Vancouver Barracks, Washington; Re-designated 29th Spruce Squadron, July 1918 Assigned to Spruce Production Division; Demobilized: January 1919
425th Aero Squadron	Constituted in the Organized Reserve (Illinois) as the 425th Attack Squadron on 15 October 1921; Consolidated on 3 December 1936, with the 425th Aero Squadron; Disbanded on 31 May 1942	
426th Aero Squadron	December 1917	Organized as the 426th Aero Squadron (Construction) at Vancouver Barracks, Washington; Re-designated 30th Spruce Squadron, July 1918 Assigned to Spruce Production Division; Demobilized: January 1919
426th Aero Squadron	Constituted in the Organized Reserve (Illinois) as the 426th Attack Squadron on 15 October 1921; Consolidated on 25 November 1936, with the 426th Aero Squadron; Disbanded on 31 May 1942	
427th Aero Squadron	January 1918	Organized as the 427th Aero Squadron (Construction) at Vancouver Barracks, Washington; Re-designated 47th Spruce Squadron, Raymond, Washington, July 1918; Transferred to Vancouver Barracks, November 1918 Assigned to Spruce Production Division; Demobilized: January 1919
427th Aero Squadron	Constituted in the Organized Reserve (Illinois) as the 426th Attack Squadron on 15 October 1921; Consolidated on 27 November 1936, with the 426th Aero Squadron; Inactivated on 28 July 1936; disbanded on 31 May 1942	
428th Aero Squadron	January 1918	Organized as the 428th Aero Squadron (Construction) at Vancouver Barracks, Washington; Re-designated 67th Spruce Squadron, Seaside, Oregon, July 1918; Transferred to Vancouver Barracks, November 1918 Assigned to Spruce Production Division; Demobilized: January 1919
428th Aero Squadron	Constituted in the Organized Reserve (Michigan) as the 428th Pursuit Squadron on 15 October 1921; Consolidated on 16 November 1936, with the 428th Aero Squadron; Disbanded on 31 May 1942	
429th Aero Squadron	January 1918	Organized as 429th Aero Squadron at Vancouver Barracks, Washington; Re-designated 31st Spruce Squadron, July 1918 Assigned to Spruce Production Division; Demobilized: January 1919
430th Aero Squadron	January 1918	Organized as the 430th Aero Squadron (Construction) at Vancouver Barracks, Washington; Re-designated 37th Spruce Squadron, Snoqualmie Falla, Washington, July 1918; Transferred to Vancouver Barracks, November 1918 Assigned to Spruce Production Division; Demobilized: January 1919
430th Aero Squadron	Constituted in the Organized Reserve (Missouri) as the 430th Pursuit Squadron on 15 October 1921; This squadron was one of the few in the Organized Reserve that possessed facilities, equipment, and aircraft. Squadron personnel were largely pilots and ground support personnel employed by Trans-World Airways (TWA) at the Kansas City Municipal Airport. Participated in a "Fly By" in June 1932 for the Honorable Patrick J. Hurley, Secretary of War, at the grand opening of the Kansas City-St. Louis Waterway; Consolidated on 25 November 1936, with the 430th Aero Squadron; Disbanded on 31 May 1942	
433d Aero Squadron	January 1918	Organized as 433d Aero Squadron at Vancouver Barracks, Washington; Re-designated 68th Spruce Squadron, July 1918 transferred to Olney, Oregon Assigned to Spruce Production Division; Demobilized: January 1919
434th Aero Squadron	January 1918	Organized as 434th Aero Squadron at Vancouver Barracks, Washington; Re-designated 69th Spruce Squadron, July 1918 transferred to Clatsop, Oregon Assigned to Spruce Production Division; Demobilized: January 1919
435th Aero Squadron	January 1918	Organized as the 435th Aero Squadron (Construction) at Vancouver Barracks, Washington; Re-designated 50th Spruce Squadron, Hoquiam, Washington, July 1918; Transferred to Vancouver Barracks, November 1918 Assigned to Spruce Production Division; Demobilized: January 1919
435th Aero Squadron	Constituted in the Organized Reserve (Texas) as the 435th Pursuit Squadron on 15 October 1921; Consolidated on 25 November 1936, with the 435th Aero Squadron; Inactivated on 31 October 1936; disbanded on 31 May 1942	
436th Aero Squadron	January 1918	Organized as the 436th Aero Squadron (Construction) at Vancouver Barracks, Washington; Re-designated 51st Spruce Squadron, Coomopo1ils, Washington, July 1918; Transferred to Vancouver Barracks, November 1918 Assigned to Spruce Production Division; Demobilized: January 1919
436th Aero Squadron	Constituted in the Organized Reserve (Colorado) as the 436th Pursuit Squadron on 15 October 1921; Consolidated on 25 November 1936, with the 436th Aero Squadron; Inactivated on 31 October 1936; disbanded on 31 May 1942	
437th Aero Squadron	January 1918	Organized as 437th Aero Squadron at Vancouver Barracks, Washington; Re-designated 79th Spruce Squadron, July 1918 transferred to Waldport, Oregon Assigned to Spruce Production Division; Demobilized: January 1919
438th Aero Squadron	January 1918	Organized as 438th Aero Squadron at Vancouver Barracks, Washington; Re-designated 52nd Spruce Squadron, July 1918 transferred to Raymond, Washington; Assigned to Spruce Production Division working for Siler Logging Co.; Returned to Vancouver Barracks November 1918; Demobilized: January 1919
439th Aero Squadron	January 1918	Organized as 439th Aero Squadron at Vancouver Barracks, Washington; Re-designated 7th Spruce Squadron, July 1918 Assigned to Spruce Production Division; Demobilized: January 1919
440th Aero Squadron	January 1918	Organized as 440th Aero Squadron at Vancouver Barracks, Washington; Re-designated 8th Spruce Squadron, July 1918 Assigned to Spruce Production Division; Demobilized: January 1919
441st Aero Squadron	January 1918	Organized as 441st Aero Squadron at Vancouver Barracks, Washington; Re-designated 9th Spruce Squadron, July 1918 Assigned to Spruce Production Division; Demobilized: January 1919
442d Aero Squadron	January 1918	Organized as 442d Aero Squadron at Vancouver Barracks, Washington; Re-designated 10th Spruce Squadron, July 1918 Assigned to Spruce Production Division; Demobilized: January 1919
443d Aero Squadron	February 1918	Organized as the 447th Aero Squadron (Construction) at Vancouver Barracks, Washington; Re-designated 11th Spruce Squadron, July 1918 Assigned to Spruce Production Division; Demobilized: January 1919
443d Aero Squadron	Constituted in the Organized Reserve (Massachusetts) as the 443d Pursuit Squadron on 15 October 1921; Consolidated on 25 November 1936, with the 443d Aero Squadron; Inactivated on 5 June 1936; disbanded on 31 May 1942	
444th Aero Squadron	January 1918	Organized as 444th Aero Squadron at Vancouver Barracks, Washington; Re-designated 12th Spruce Squadron, July 1918 Assigned to Spruce Production Division; Demobilized: January 1919
445th Aero Squadron	February 1918	Organized as 445th Aero Squadron at Camp Darrington, Washington; Re-designated 38th Spruce Squadron, July 1918 Assigned to Spruce Production Division; Demobilized: January 1919
446th Aero Squadron	February 1918	Organized as 446th Aero Squadron at Vancouver Barracks, Washington; Re-designated 53d Spruce Squadron, July 1918 transferred to Enumclaw, Washington Assigned to Spruce Production Division; Demobilized: January 1919
447th Aero Squadron	February 1918	Organized as the 447th Aero Squadron (Construction) at Vancouver Barracks, Washington; Re-designated 70th Spruce Squadron, Miami, Oregon, July 1918; Transferred to Vancouver Barracks, November 1918 Assigned to Spruce Production Division; Demobilized: January 1919
447th Aero Squadron	Constituted in the Organized Reserve (New York) as the 447th Pursuit Squadron on 15 October 1921; Consolidated on 25 November 1936, with the 447th Aero Squadron; Inactivated in June 1929; disbanded on 31 May 1942	
448th Aero Squadron	February 1918	Organized as the 448th Aero Squadron (Construction) at Vancouver Barracks, Washington; Re-designated 54th Spruce Squadron, Raymond, Washington, July 1918; Transferred to Vancouver Barracks, November 1918 Assigned to Spruce Production Division; Demobilized: January 1919
448th Aero Squadron	Constituted in the Organized Reserve (New York) as the 448th Pursuit Squadron on 15 October 1921; Consolidated on 25 November 1936, with the 448th Aero Squadron; Disbanded on 31 May 1942	
449th Aero Squadron	February 1918	Organized as the 449th Aero Squadron (Construction) at Vancouver Barracks, Washington; Re-designated 55th Spruce Squadron, South Bend, Washington, July 1918; Transferred to Vancouver Barracks, November 1918 Assigned to Spruce Production Division; Demobilized: January 1919
449th Aero Squadron	Constituted in the Organized Reserve (New York) as the 449th Pursuit Squadron on 15 October 1921; Consolidated on 25 November 1936, with the 449th Aero Squadron; Disbanded on 31 May 1942	

=== 450th to 499th Aero Squadrons ===
Aero Squadron	Established	World War I
Aero Squadron	Notes/Subsequent History	
451st Aero Squadron	February 1918	Organized as 451st Aero Squadron at Vancouver Barracks, Washington; Re-designated 56th Spruce Squadron, July 1918 transferred to Nemah, Washington Assigned to Spruce Production Division; Demobilized: January 1919
452d Aero Squadron	February 1918	Organized as 452d Aero Squadron at Vancouver Barracks, Washington; Re-designated 71st Spruce Squadron, July 1918 transferred to Seaside, Oregon Assigned to Spruce Production Division; Demobilized: January 1919
453d Aero Squadron	February 1918	Organized as 453d Aero Squadron at Vancouver Barracks, Washington; Re-designated 80th Spruce Squadron, July 1918 transferred to Toledo, Oregon Assigned to Spruce Production Division; Demobilized: January 1919
454th Aero Squadron	February 1918	Organized as 454th Aero Squadron at Vancouver Barracks, Washington; Re-designated 57th Spruce Squadron, July 1918 transferred to Raymond, Washington Assigned to Spruce Production Division; Demobilized: January 1919
455th Aero Squadron	February 1918	Organized as the 455th Aero Squadron (Construction) at Vancouver Barracks, Washington; Re-designated 81st Spruce Squadron, Waldport, Oregon, July 1918; Transferred to Vancouver Barracks, November 1918 Assigned to Spruce Production Division; Demobilized: January 1919
455th Aero Squadron	Constituted in the Organized Reserve (North Carolina) as the 455th Pursuit Squadron on 15 October 1921; Reorganized and re-designated as the 455th Bombardment Squadron on 18 August 1933; Consolidated on 25 November 1936, with the 455th Aero Squadron; Inactivated on 19 September 1929; disbanded on 31 May 1942	
456th Aero Squadron	February 1918	Organized as the 456th Aero Squadron (Construction) at Vancouver Barracks, Washington; Re-designated 72d Spruce Squadron, Clatsop, Oregon, July 1918; Transferred to Vancouver Barracks, November 1918 Assigned to Spruce Production Division; Demobilized: January 1919
456th Aero Squadron	Constituted in the Organized Reserve (Tennessee) as the 456th Pursuit Squadron on 15 October 1921; Consolidated on 25 November 1936, with the 456th Aero Squadron; Disbanded on 31 May 1942	
457th Aero Squadron	February 1918	Organized as the 457th Aero Squadron (Construction) at Vancouver Barracks, Washington; Re-designated 73d Spruce Squadron, Clatsop, Oregon, July 1918; Transferred to Vancouver Barracks, November 1918 Assigned to Spruce Production Division; Demobilized: January 1919
457th Aero Squadron	Constituted in the Organized Reserve (Georgia) as the 457th Pursuit Squadron on 15 October 1921; Consolidated on 25 November 1936, with the 457th Aero Squadron; Disbanded on 31 May 1942	
458th Aero Squadron	February 1918	Organized as the 458th Aero Squadron (Construction) at Vancouver Barracks, Washington; Re-designated 74th Spruce Squadron, Clatsop, Oregon, July 1918; Transferred to Vancouver Barracks, November 1918 Assigned to Spruce Production Division; Demobilized: January 1919
458th Aero Squadron	Constituted in the Organized Reserve (Georgia) as the 458th Pursuit Squadron on 15 October 1921; Reorganized and re-designated as the 458th Bombardment Squadron on 18 August 1933; Consolidated on 3 December 1936, with the 458th Aero Squadron; Disbanded on 31 May 1942	
459th Aero Squadron	March 1918	Organized as the 459th Aero Squadron (Construction) at Vancouver Barracks, Washington; Re-designated 58th Spruce Squadron, Aberdeen, Washington, July 1918; Transferred to Vancouver Barracks, November 1918 Assigned to Spruce Production Division; Demobilized: January 1919
459th Aero Squadron	Constituted in the Organized Reserve (Tennessee) as the 459th Observation Squadron on 15 October 1921; Consolidated on 3 December 1936, with the 459th Aero Squadron; Inactivated on 19 September 1929; disbanded on 31 May 1942	
460th Aero Squadron	December 1917	Organized as 460th Aero Squadron at Portland, Oregon; Re-designated 105th Spruce Squadron, July 1918 Assigned to Spruce Production Division; Demobilized: January 1919
462d Aero Squadron	4 August 1917	Formed as 48th Aero Squadron (Prov); AEF: 29 October 1917 – July 1919; Construction Squadron; 3d Aviation Instruction Center; Issoudun Aerodrome; Demobilized: August 1919
463d Aero Squadron	3 August 1917	Formed as 51st Aero Squadron (Prov); AEF: 30 October 1917 – July 1919; Construction Squadron; 3d Aviation Instruction Center; Issoudun Aerodrome; Demobilized: July 1919
464th Aero Squadron	7 August 1917	Formed as 52d Aero Squadron (Prov); AEF: 29 October 1917 – July 1919; Construction Squadron; 3d Aviation Instruction Center; Issoudun Aerodrome; Demobilized: July 1919
464th Aero Squadron	Constituted in the United States Army Air Corps as Air Park No. 4, and assigned to the 2d Bombardment Group, Kelly Field, Texas on 26 June 1922; Concurrently organized with personnel and equipment from the 464th Aero Squadron; Re-designated as the 59th Service Squadron on 25 January 1923; Demobilized on 1 September 1936.	
465th Aero Squadron	26 August 1917	Formed as 53d Aero Squadron (Prov); AEF: 29 October 1917 – March 1919; Construction Squadron; 3d Aviation Instruction Center; Issoudun Aerodrome; Demobilized: March 1919
466th Aero Squadron	28 July 1917	Formed as 54th Aero Squadron (Prov); AEF: 29 October 1917 – January 1919; Construction Squadron; 3d Aviation Instruction Center; Issoudun Aerodrome; Demobilized: February 1919
467th Aero Squadron	6 August 1917	Formed as 55th Aero Squadron (Prov); AEF: 29 October 1917 – March 1919; Construction Squadron; 3d Aviation Instruction Center; Issoudun Aerodrome; Demobilized: March 1919
468th Aero Squadron	8 August 1917	Formed as 56th Aero Squadron (Prov); AEF: 29 October 1917 – June 1919; Construction Squadron; 3d Aviation Instruction Center; Issoudun Aerodrome; Air Service Production Center No. 2. Romorantin Aerodrome; Air Service Acceptance Park No. 1 Orly Field, Paris; Demobilized: July 1919
468th Aero Squadron	Constituted in the Organized Reserve (Illinois) as the 468th Attack Squadron on 15 October 1921; Consolidated on 3 December 1936, with the 469th Aero Squadron; Disbanded on 31 May 1942	
469th Aero Squadron	8 August 1917	Formed as 57th Aero Squadron (Prov); AEF: 29 October 1917 – March 1919; Construction Squadron; 3d Aviation Instruction Center; Issoudun Aerodrome; 2d Aviation Instruction Center; Tours Aerodrome; Demobilized: March 1919
469th Aero Squadron	Constituted in the Organized Reserve (Illinois) as the 469th Attack Squadron on 15 October 1921; Consolidated on 3 December 1936, with the 469th Aero Squadron; Disbanded on 31 May 1942	
470th Aero Squadron	9 August 1917	Formed as 58th Aero Squadron (Prov); AEF: 5 February 1918 – December 1918; Construction Squadron; Served at RAF Stations in England; Demobilized: December 1918
470th Aero Squadron	Constituted in the Organized Reserve (Illinois) as the 470th Attack Squadron on 15 October 1921; Consolidated on 3 December 1936, with the 47th Aero Squadron; Disbanded on 31 May 1942	
474th Aero Squadron	11 August 1917	Formed as 62d Aero Squadron (Prov); AEF: 24 March 1918 – January 1919; Construction Squadron; Constructed airfields for First Army; Demobilized: January 1919
475th Aero Squadron	August 1917	Organized as 63d Aero Squadron (Construction), Kelly Field, Texas; Re-designated 475th Aero Squadron, February 1918; AEF: February 1918 – December 1918; Demobilized: December 1918
475th Aero Squadron	Constituted in the Organized Reserve (California) as the 475th Attack Squadron on 15 October 1921; Consolidated on 16 November 1936, with the 475th Aero Squadron; Inactivated on 31 October 1936; disbanded on 31 May 1942	
476th Aero Squadron	August 1917	Organized as 64th Aero Squadron (Construction), Kelly Field, Texas; Re-designated 476th Aero Squadron, February 1918; AEF: February 1918 – December 1918; Demobilized: December 1918
476th Aero Squadron	Constituted in the Organized Reserve (California) as the 476th Pursuit Squadron on 15 October 1921; Consolidated on 24 January 1931, with the 476th Aero Squadron; Disbanded on 31 May 1942	
477th Aero Squadron	11 August 1917	Formed as 65th Aero Squadron (Prov); AEF: 21 March 1918 – January 1919; Construction Squadron; Constructed airfields for First Army; Demobilized: January 1919
477th Aero Squadron	Constituted in the Organized Reserve (California) as the 477th Pursuit Squadron on 15 October 1921; >Consolidated on 24 January 1931, with the 477th Aero Squadron; Disbanded on 31 May 1942	
479th Aero Squadron	August 1917	Organized as 67th Aero Squadron (Construction), Kelly Field, Texas; Re-designated 479th Aero Squadron, February 1918; AEF: February 1918 – December 1918; Demobilized: December 1918
479th Aero Squadron	Constituted in the Organized Reserve (California) as the 479th Pursuit Squadron on 15 October 1921; Relocated on 28 January 1930, to the Los Angeles Municipal Airport, Los Angeles. There the squadron became one of a few in the Organized Reserve that possessed facilities, equipment, and aircraft.; Consolidated on 24 January 1931, with the 479th Aero Squadron; Inactivated on 2 September 1937; disbanded on 31 May 1942	
480th Aero Squadron	12 August 1917	Formed as 68th Aero Squadron (Prov); AEF: 21 March 1918 – February 1919; Construction Squadron; Construction Air Service Production Center #2, Romorantin; Demobilized: February 1919
481st Aero Squadron	12 August 1917	Formed as 69th Aero Squadron (Prov); AEF: 21 March 1918 – February 1919; Construction Squadron; Air Service Production Center #2, Romorantin; Demobilized: February 1919
481st Aero Squadron	Constituted in the Organized Reserve (Pennsylvania) as the 481st Bombardment Squadron on 31 March 1924; Consolidated on 3 December 1936, with the 483d Aero Squadron; Inactivated by June 1940; disbanded on 31 May 1942	
482d Aero Squadron	15 August 1917	Formed as 70th Aero Squadron; AEF: 26 March 1918 – 8 February 1919; Construction Squadron; Airfield construction from 28 March 1918, to First Army 23 Aug, then to Second Army 28 Oct; Demobilized: 8 February 1919
482d Aero Squadron	Constituted in the Organized Reserve (Maryland) as the 482d Bombardment Squadron on 31 March 1924; Consolidated on 2 December 1936, with the 482d Aero Squadron; Inactivated on 23 July 1929; disbanded on 31 May 1942; Reconstituted and consolidated (21 April 1944) with 482d Bombardment Squadron (Very Heavy) which was constituted on 28 February 1944; Inactivated on 30 June 1946	
483d Aero Squadron	15 August 1917	Formed as 71st Aero Squadron; AEF: 21 March 1918 – February 1919; Construction Squadron; Air Service Production Center #2, Romorantin; Demobilized: February 1919
483d Aero Squadron	Constituted in the Organized Reserve (Pennsylvania) as the 483d Bombardment Squadron on 31 March 1924; Consolidated on 2 December 1936, with the 483d Aero Squadron; Inactivated on 23 July 1929; disbanded on 31 May 1942	
484th Aero Squadron	15 August 1917	Formed as 72d Aero Squadron; AEF: 21 March 1918 – January 1919; Construction Squadron; Constructed airfields for AEF, First Army from 23 Aug and Second Army from 28 Oct; Demobilized: February 1919
484th Aero Squadron	Constituted in the Organized Reserve (Pennsylvania) as the 484th Bombardment Squadron on 31 March 1924; Consolidated on 2 December 1936, with the 484th Aero Squadron; Inactivated on 12 May 1937, by relief of personnel; disbanded on 31 May 1942; Reconstituted and consolidated (21 April 1944) with 484th Bombardment Squadron (Very Heavy) which was constituted on 28 February 1944; Inactivated on 30 June 1946	
485th Aero Squadron	15 August 1917	Formed as 73d Aero Squadron; AEF: 21 March 1918 – May 1919; Construction Squadron; Construct. Air Service Production Center #2, Romorantin, France 24 May 1918; Construction Air Service Spare Depot, Chatenay-sur-Seine, France 10 September 1918; Demobilized: May 1919
485th Aero Squadron	Constituted in the Organized Reserve (Ohio) as the 485th Bombardment Squadron on 31 March 1924; Consolidated on 5 December 1936, with the 485th Aero Squadron; Inactivated by June 1937; disbanded on 31 May 1942; Reconstituted and consolidated 28 February 1944, with the 485th Bombardment Squadron (Very Heavy); inactivated on 10 June 1946	
486th Aero Squadron	13 August 1917	Formed as 74th Aero Squadron; AEF: 21 March 1918 – June 1919; Construction Squadron; Air Service Production Center #2, Romorantin; Demobilized: June 1919
486th Aero Squadron	Constituted in the Organized Reserve (Indiana) as the 486th Bombardment Squadron on 31 March 1924; Consolidated on 5 December 1936, with the 486th Aero Squadron; Inactivated by March 1930; disbanded on 31 May 1942	
487th Aero Squadron	14 August 1917	Formed as 75th Aero Squadron; AEF: 25 December 1917 – May 1919; Construction Squadron; Air Service Production Center #2, Romorantin 18 January 1918; 2d Air Depot, Latrecey; Demobilized: May 1919
487th Aero Squadron	Constituted in the Organized Reserve (Kentucky) as the 487th Bombardment Squadron on 31 March 1924; Consolidated on 5 December 1936, with the 487th Aero Squadron; Inactivated by March 1930; disbanded on 31 May 1942	
488th Aero Squadron	14 August 1917	Formed as 76th Aero Squadron; AEF: 25 December 1917 – May 1919; Construction Squadron; Air Service Production Center No. 2, Romorantin Aerodrome; Demobilized: May 1919
489th Aero Squadron	13 August 1917	Formed as 77th Aero Squadron; AEF: 1 January 1918 – 8 February 1919; Construction Squadron; Air Service Production Center No. 2, Romorantin Aerodrome; Demobilized: 6 March 1919
489th Aero Squadron	Constituted in the Organized Reserve (Washington) as the 489th Bombardment Squadron on 31 March 1924. The squadron was one of a few in the Organized Reserve that possessed facilities, equipment, and aircraft; Consolidated in June 1932 with the 489th Aero Squadron; Inactivated on 30 January 1942, by relief of personnel; Consolidated (1958) with 489th Bombardment Squadron (Medium) which was constituted on 10 August 1942; Discontinued, and inactivated on 1 January 1962; Reactivated as the 489th Reconnaissance Squadron on 26 August 2011, at Beale Air Force Base, California	
490th Aero Squadron	14 August 1917	Formed as 78th Aero Squadron; AEF: 7 December 1917– February 1919; Construction Squadron; Air Service Production Center No. 2. Romorantin Aerodrome; Demobilized: February 1919
490th Aero Squadron	Constituted in the Organized Reserve (Washington) as the 490th Bombardment Squadron on 31 March 1924; Consolidated on 7 December 1936, with the 490th Aero Squadron; Inactivated on 2 March 1937; disbanded on 31 May 1942	
491st Aero Squadron	14 August 1917	Formed as 79th Aero Squadron; AEF: 8 December 1917 – January 1919; Construction Squadron; 7th Aviation Instruction Center; Clermont-Ferrand Aerodrome; Demobilized: January 1919
491st Aero Squadron	Constituted in the Organized Reserve (Washington) as the 491st Bombardment Squadron on 31 March 1924; Consolidated on 5 December 1936, with the 491st Aero Squadron; Inactivated on 2 March 1937; disbanded on 31 May 1942; Consolidated (1958) with 491st Bombardment Squadron (Medium) which was constituted on 14 August 1942; Discontinued, and inactivated, on 25 June 1961	
492d Aero Squadron	15 August 1917	Formed as 80th Aero Squadron; AEF: 8 December 1917– Construction Squadron; 2d Aviation Instruction Center; Tours Aerodrome; Demobilized: January 1919
492d Aero Squadron	Constituted in the Organized Reserve (Washington) as the 492d Bombardment Squadron on 31 March 1924; Consolidated on 5 December 1936, with the 492d Aero Squadron; Inactivated on 2 March 1937; disbanded on 31 May 1942; Consolidated (1960) with 492d Bombardment Squadron (Heavy) which was constituted on 19 September 1942; Discontinued, and inactivated on 1 February 1963	
493d Aero Squadron	10 July 1917	Formed as 45th Aero Squadron; AEF: 8 December 1917 – January 1919; Construction Squadron; 3d Aviation Instruction Center; Issoudun Aerodrome; Demobilized: January 1919
493d Aero Squadron	Constituted in the Organized Reserve (Wisconsin) as the 493d Bombardment Squadron on 31 March 1924; Consolidated on 7 December 1936, with the 493d Aero Squadron; Disbanded on 31 May 1942	
494th Aero Squadron	17 August 1917	Formed as 82d Aero Squadron; AEF: 8 December 1917 – May 1919; Construction Squadron; 3d Aviation Instruction Center; Issoudun Aerodrome; Demobilized: May 1919
494th Aero Squadron	Constituted in the Organized Reserve (Wisconsin) as the 494th Bombardment Squadron on 31 March 1924; Consolidated on 7 December 1936, with the 494th Aero Squadron; Disbanded on 31 May 1942	
495th Aero Squadron	August 1917	Organized as 83d Aero Squadron (Construction) at Kelly Field, Texas; Re-designated February 1918 at Camp Morrison, Virginia; AEF: March 1918 – January 1919; Demobilized in January 1919.
495th Aero Squadron	Constituted in the Organized Reserve (Wisconsin) as the 495th Bombardment Squadron on 31 March 1924; Consolidated on 7 December 1936, with the 495th Aero Squadron; Inactivated on 1 December 1929; disbanded on 31 May 1942	
496th Aero Squadron	11 October 1917	Formed as 200th Aero Squadron; AEF: 20 November 1917 – April 1919; Construction Squadron; 2d Aviation Instruction Center; Tours Aerodrome; Demobilized: April 1919
497th Aero Squadron	11 October 1917	Formed as 201st Aero Squadron; AEF: 20 November 1917 – April 199; Construction Squadron; 2d Aviation Instruction Center; Tours Aerodrome; Demobilized: April 1919
498th Aero Squadron	15 December 1917	Formed as 202d Aero Squadron; AEF: 25 September 1918– January 1919; Construction Squadron; Constructed airfields for First Army; Demobilized: January 1919
499th Aero Squadron	19 December 1917	Formed as 203d Aero Squadron; AEF: 4 November 1918 – March 1919; Construction Squadron; Air Service Replacement Concentration Center; St. Maixent Replacement Barracks; Demobilized: March 1919

=== 500th to 799th Aero Squadrons ===
Aero Squadron	Established	World War I
Aero Squadron	Notes/Subsequent History	
500th Aero Squadron	19 December 1917	Formed as 204th Aero Squadron; AEF: 9 November 1918 – March 1919; Construction Squadron; Air Service Replacement Concentration Center; St. Maixent Replacement Barracks; Demobilized: March 1919
501st Aero Squadron	December 1917	Organized as 205th Aero Squadron (Construction) at Camp Morrison, Virginia; Re-designated February 1918; Transferred to several locations within Continental United States, March 1918 – January 1919. Demobilized in January 1919.
501st Aero Squadron	Constituted in the Organized Reserve (Pennsylvania) as the 501st Pursuit Squadron on 15 October 1921; Reorganized and re-designated as the 501st Transport Squadron on 1 October 1933; Consolidated on 7 December 1936, with the 501st Aero Squadron; Inactivated by 7 December 1941; disbanded on 31 May 1942	
502d Aero Squadron	December 1917	Organized as 206th Aero Squadron (Construction) at Camp Morrison, Virginia; Re-designated February 1918; Transferred to several locations within Continental United States, February 1918 – January 1919. Demobilized in January 1919.
502d Aero Squadron	Constituted in the Organized Reserve (Pennsylvania) as the 502d Pursuit Squadron on 15 October 1921; Reorganized and re-designated as the 502d Transport Squadron on 1 October 1933; Consolidated on 7 December 1936, with the 502d Aero Squadron; Inactivated on 23 July 1939; disbanded on 31 May 1942	
503d Aero Squadron	December 1917	Organized as 207th Aero Squadron (Construction) at Camp Morrison, Virginia; Re-designated February 1918 at Dorr Field, Florida. Transferred to Aviation General Supply Depot, Middleton, Pennsylvania, September 1918; Demobilized in March 1919.
503d Aero Squadron	Constituted in the Organized Reserve (Pennsylvania) as the 503d Pursuit Squadron on 15 October 1921; Reorganized and re-designated as the 503d Transport Squadron on 1 October 1933; Consolidated on 7 December 1936, with the 503d Aero Squadron; Disbanded on 31 May 1942	
504th Aero Squadron	December 1917	Organized as 208th Aero Squadron (Construction) at Camp Morrison, Virginia; Re-designated February 1918. Transferred to several locations within Continental United States, February 1918 – January 1919. Demobilized in January 1919.
505th Aero Squadron	December 1917	Organized as 209th Aero Squadron (Construction) at Kelly Field, Texas; Re-designated February 1918 at Rich Field, Texas. Transferred to several locations within Continental United States, May 1918 – January 1919. Demobilized in January 1919.
505th Aero Squadron	Constituted in the Organized Reserve (Texas) as the 505th Pursuit Squadron on 15 October 1921;Reorganized and re-designated as the 505th Transport Squadron on 1 October 1933; Consolidated on 30 November 1936, with the 505th Aero Squadron; Inactivated on 31 October 1936; disbanded on 31 May 1942	
506th Aero Squadron	July 1918	Organized as a construction squadron, Brooks Field, Texas; Demobilized, November 1918
507th Aero Squadron	February 1918	Organized as a construction squadron, Kelly Field, Texas; Transferred to Wilbur Wright Field, Ohio, July 1918. Demobilized, November 1918
508th Aero Squadron	February 1918	Organized as a construction squadron, Kelly Field, Texas; Transferred to Gerstner Field, Louisiana, August 1918. Demobilized, November 1918
601st Aero Squadron	January 1918	Organized as 601st Aero Squadron at Vancouver Barracks, Washington; Re-designated 13th Spruce Squadron, July 1918 Assigned to Spruce Production Division; Demobilized: January 1919
603d Aero Squadron	February 1918	Organized as 603d Aero Squadron at Vancouver Barracks, Washington; Re-designated 14th Spruce Squadron, July 1918 Assigned to Spruce Production Division; Demobilized: January 1919
607th Aero Squadron	January 1918	Organized as a Supply Squadron, Kelly Field, Texas; Transferred January 1918 to Fort Wayne, Michigan; Demobilized: February 1919
607th Aero Squadron	Constituted in the Organized Reserve (Indiana) 1 October 1933, as the 607th Supply Squadron; Consolidated on 23 November 1936, with 607th Aero Squadron; Never activated; disbanded 31 May 1942	
608th Aero Squadron	January 1918	Organized as a Supply Squadron, Kelly Field, Texas; Transferred August 1918 to Mitchell Field, New York; Demobilized: September 1919
608th Aero Squadron	Constituted in the Organized Reserve (New York) as the 608th Supply Squadron 1 October 1933; Consolidated on 8 December 1936, with 608th Aero Squadron; Never activated; disbanded 31 May 1942	
609th Aero Squadron	January 1918	Organized as a Supply Squadron, Kelly Field, Texas; Transferred August 1918 to Mitchell Field, New York; Demobilized: September 1919
609th Aero Squadron	Constituted in the Organized Reserve (Illinois) as the 609th Supply Squadron 1 October 1933; Consolidated on 8 December 1936, with 609th Aero Squadron; Never activated; disbanded 31 May 1942	
610th Aero Squadron	January 1918	Organized as a Supply Squadron, Kelly Field, Texas; Transferred June 1918 to Aviation General Supply Depot, Middletown, Pennsylvania; Demobilized: March 1919
610th Aero Squadron	Constituted in the Organized Reserve (Georgia) 1 October 1933, as the 610th Supply Squadron; Consolidated on 8 December 1936, with 610th Aero Squadron; Never activated; disbanded 31 May 1942	
611th Aero Squadron	January 1918	Organized as a Supply Squadron, Kelly Field, Texas; Transferred June 1918 to Langley Field, Virginia; Demobilized: January 1919
611th Aero Squadron	Constituted in the Organized Reserve (Alabama) 1 October 1933, as the 611th Supply Squadron; Consolidated on 8 December 1936, with 611th Aero Squadron; Never activated; disbanded 31 May 1942	
612th Aero Squadron	January 1918	Organized as a Supply Squadron, Kelly Field, Texas; Transferred July 1918 to Wilbur Wright Field, Ohio; Demobilized: March 1919
612th Aero Squadron	Constituted in the Organized Reserve (New York) 1 October 1933, as the 612th Supply Squadron; Consolidated on 30 November 1937, with 612th Aero Squadron; Never activated; disbanded 31 May 1942	
613th Aero Squadron	January 1918	Organized as a Supply Squadron, Kelly Field, Texas; Transferred August 1918 to Garden City, New York; Demobilized: January 1919
613th Aero Squadron	Constituted in the Organized Reserve (New York) 1 October 1933, as the 613th Supply Squadron; Consolidated on 3 December 1936, with 613th Aero Squadron; Never activated; disbanded 31 May 1942	
614th Aero Squadron	January 1918	Organized as a Supply Squadron, Kelly Field, Texas; Transferred August 1918 to Garden City, New York; Demobilized: January 1919
614th Aero Squadron	Constituted in the Organized Reserve 1 October 1933, as the 614th Supply Squadron; Consolidated on 3 December 1936, with 614th Aero Squadron; Never activated; disbanded 31 May 1942	
615th Aero Squadron	January 1918	Organized as a Supply Squadron, Kelly Field, Texas; Transferred July 1918 to Souther Field, Georgia; Demobilized: March 1919
615th Aero Squadron	Constituted in the Organized Reserve 1 October 1933, as the 615th Supply Squadron. Consolidated on 3 December 1936, with 615th Aero Squadron; Never activated; disbanded 31 May 1942	
632d Aero Squadron	14 August 1917	Formed as 111th Aero Squadron; Supply Squadron; Kelly Field, Texas; Demobilized: 19 August 1919
633d Aero Squadron	18 August 1917	Formed as 112th Aero Squadron; Supply Squadron; Kelly Field, Texas; Demobilized: 19 August 1919
634th Aero Squadron	26 August 1917	Supply Squadron, Formed as 113th Aero Squadron, Re-designated February 1918. Assigned to Aviation General Supply Depot, Middletown, Pennsylvania, September 1917. Demobilized March 1919
634th Aero Squadron	Depot was established in early 1917 as a general supply and ordnance depot. Also known as "Middletown Ordnance Depot"	
635th Aero Squadron	August 1917	Supply Squadron, Formed as 114th Aero Squadron, Re-designated February 1918. Assigned to Aviation General Supply Depot, Richmond, Virginia, September 1917. Demobilized July 1919
635th Aero Squadron	Depot was established in early 1917 as a general supply depot. Located on the site of the Virginia-Caroline Chemical Company	
636th Aero Squadron	28 August 1917	Formed as 115th Aero Squadron; Re-designated: 636th Aero Squadron 1 July 1918; AEF: 27 December 1917 – 11 May 1919; Supply Squadron; Demobilized: 8 April 1919
636th Aero Squadron	Constituted in the National Guard in 1921 as the 115th Squadron (Observation) and allotted to the state of California; Organized in April 1924 at Hollywood. Relocated on 16 June 1924, to Clover Field, Santa Monica, California. Concurrently federally recognized at Clover Field Currently California ANG 115th Airlift Squadron	
637th Aero Squadron	29 August 1917	Formed as 116th Aero Squadron; Re-designated: 6379th Aero Squadron 1 July 1918; AEF: 27 December 1917 – 25 March 1919; Advance Section, Services of Supply (SOS) Supply Squadron; 1st Air Depot; Colombey-les-Belles Aerodrome; Demobilized: 20 May 1919
637th Aero Squadron	Constituted in the National Guard in 1921 as the 116th Squadron (Observation), and allotted to the state of Washington; Organized on 24 July 1924, and federally recognized on 6 August 1924, at Felts Field, Parkwater, Washington; Consolidated on 20 October 1936, with the 116th Aero Squadron Currently Washington ANG 116th Air Refueling Squadron	
638th Aero Squadron	30 August 1917	Formed at 117th Aero Squadron; AEF: 31 December 1917 – July 1919; Pursuit Squadron; Assigned to 5th Pursuit Group (Did not see combat); Demobilized 31 July 1919
639th Aero Squadron	31 August 1917	Formed as 118th Aero Squadron; Re-designated: 639th Aero Squadron 1 July 1918; AEF: 3 January 1918 – 25 May 1919; Supply Squadron; Demobilized: 6 June 1919
639th Aero Squadron	Constituted in the National Guard in 1921 as the 118th Squadron (Observation) and allotted to the state of Connecticut; Organized on 27 July 1923, and federally recognized on 1 November 1923, at Brainard Field, Hartford, Connecticut.; Currently Connecticut ANG 118th Airlift Squadron	
640th Aero Squadron	1 September 1917	Formed as 121st Aero Squadron; AEF: 24 January 1918 – April 1919; Supply Squadron; 3d Air Instructional Center; Issoudun Aerodrome; Demobilized: April 1919
641st Aero Squadron	2 September 1917	Formed as 122d Aero Squadron; AEF: 24 January 1918 – May 1919; Supply Squadron; 3d Air Instructional Center; Issoudun Aerodrome; Demobilized: June 1919
642d Aero Squadron	2 September 1917	Formed as 123d Aero Squadron; AEF: 24 January 1918 – May 1919; Supply Squadron; 3d Air Instructional Center; Issoudun Aerodrome; Demobilized: June 1919
643d Aero Squadron	3 September 1917	Formed as 124th Aero Squadron; AEF: 24 January 1918 – May 1919; Advance Section, Services of Supply (SOS) Supply Squadron; 1st Air Depot; Colombey-les-Belles Aerodrome; Demobilized: June 1919
644th Aero Squadron	2 September 1917	Formed as 125th Aero Squadron; AEF: 24 January 1918 – May 1919; Supply Squadron; 3d Air Instructional Center; Issoudun Aerodrome; Demobilized: June 1919
645th Aero Squadron	3 September 1917	Formed as 126th Aero Squadron; AEF: 28 January 1918 – June 1919; Advance Section, Services of Supply (SOS) Supply Squadron; 1st Air Depot; Colombey-les-Belles Aerodrome; Demobilized: July 1919
646th Aero Squadron	3 September 1917	Formed as 127th Aero Squadron; AEF: 24 January 1918 – April 1919; Supply Squadron; Air Service Replacement Concentration Center; St. Maixent Replacement Barracks; Demobilized: April 1919
648th Aero Squadron	5 September 1917	Formed as 129th Aero Squadron; AEF: 13 April 1918 – May 1919; Supply Squadron, probably initially with 1st Air Depot in Colombey-les-Belles; In September 1918, split into three flights: (A) 1st Day Bombardment Group; Amanty Airdrome 10 September, Maulan Aerodrome 23 September (B) First Army Observation Group; Gondreville Aerodrome 6 September, Vavincourt Aerodrome 29 September (C) 1st Air Depot; Colombey-les-Belles Aerodrome; Demobilized: June 1919
649th Aero Squadron	5 September 1917	Formed as 130th Aero Squadron; AEF: 12 April 1918 – June 1919; Supply Squadron; Air Service Production Center No. 2. Romorantin Aerodrome; Demobilized: July 1919
650th Aero Squadron	5 September 1917	Formed as 131st Aero Squadron; AEF: 13 April 1918 – May 1919; Supply Squadron; Air Service Acceptance Park No. 1 Orly Airport, Paris; Demobilized: May 1919
652d Aero Squadron	September 1917	Formed as the 133d Aero Squadron; Supply Squadron, Kelly Field, Texas; Re-designated 652d Aero Squadron (Supply) January 1918; Transferred to Garden City, New York January 1918; Transferred to AEF: Training in England entire time Demobilized: December 1918
652d Aero Squadron	Constituted in the Organized Reserve (New York) 1 October 1933, as the 652d Repair Squadron; Consolidated on 3 December 1936, with 652d Aero Squadron; Never activated; disbanded 31 May 1942	
653d Aero Squadron	September 1917	Formed as the 134th Aero Squadron; Supply Squadron, Kelly Field, Texas; Re-designated 653d Aero Squadron (Supply) January 1918; Transferred to Camp Morrison, Virginia, January 1918; Demobilized: December 1918
653d Aero Squadron	Constituted in the Organized Reserve (New York) 1 October 1933, as the 653d Repair Squadron; Consolidated on 3 December 1936, with 653d Aero Squadron; Never activated; disbanded 31 May 1942	
654th Aero Squadron	December 1917	Formed as the 146th Aero Squadron; Supply Squadron, Garden City, New York; Re-designated 654th Aero Squadron (Supply) January 1918; Demobilized: January 1919
654th Aero Squadron	Constituted in the Organized Reserve 1 October 1933, as the 654th Repair Squadron; Consolidated on 4 December 1936, with 654th Aero Squadron; Never activated; disbanded 31 May 1942	
655th Aero Squadron	26 October 1917	Formed as 220th Aero Squadron; AEF: 30 January 1918 – May 1919; Supply Squadron; 2d Aviation Instruction Center; Tours Aerodrome; Demobilized: May 1919
655th Aero Squadron	Constituted in the Organized Reserve 1 October 1933, as the 655th Repair Squadron; Consolidated on 4 December 1936, with 655th Aero Squadron; Never activated; disbanded 31 May 1942	
656th Aero Squadron	22 December 1917	Formed as 230th Aero Squadron; AEF: 28 January 1918 – May 1919; Supply Squadron; Air Service Production Center No. 2. Romorantin Aerodrome; Demobilized: May 1919
656th Aero Squadron	Constituted in the Organized Reserve (Nebraska) 1 October 1933, as the 656th Repair Squadron; Consolidated on 4 December 1936, with 656th Aero Squadron; Never activated; disbanded 31 May 1942	
657th Aero Squadron	19 December 1917	Formed as 231st Aero Squadron; AEF: 24 February 1918 – March 1919; Supply Squadron; Stationed at various RAF stations in England; Demobilized: March 1919
657th Aero Squadron	Constituted in the Organized Reserve (Indiana) 1 October 1933, as the 657th Repair Squadron; Consolidated on 4 December 1936, with 657th Aero Squadron; Never activated; disbanded 31 May 1942	
658th Aero Squadron	23 December 1917	Formed as 232d Aero Squadron; AEF: 25 February 1918– May 1919; Supply Squadron; Air Service Acceptance Park No. 1 Orly Airport, Paris; Demobilized: May 1919
659th Aero Squadron	22 December 1917	Formed as 233d Aero Squadron; AEF: 13 April 1918 – July 1919; Advance Section, Services of Supply (SOS) Supply Squadron; 1st Air Depot; Colombey-les-Belles Aerodrome; Demobilized: July 1919
659th Aero Squadron	Constituted in the Organized Reserve (Illinois) 1 October 1933, as the 659th Repair Squadron; Consolidated on 4 December 1936, with 659th Aero Squadron; Never activated; disbanded 31 May 1942	
660th Aero Squadron	19 December 1917	Formed as 234th Aero Squadron; AEF: 17 May 1918 – May 1919; Supply Squadron; Air Service Acceptance Park No. 1 Orly Airport, Paris; Demobilized: June 1919
660th Aero Squadron	Constituted in the Organized Reserve (Alabama) 1 October 1933, as the 660th Repair Squadron; Consolidated on 4 December 1936, with 660th Aero Squadron; Never activated; disbanded 31 May 1942	
661st Aero Squadron	December 1917	Formed as the 235th Aero Squadron; Supply Squadron, Aviation General Supply Depot, Kelly Field, Texas; Re-designated 661st Aero Squadron (Supply) February 1918; Deployed to AEF May 1918 – December 1918; Demobilized: December 1918
661st Aero Squadron	Constituted in the Organized Reserve (New Jersey) 1 October 1933, as the 661st Repair Squadron; Consolidated on 4 December 1936, with 661st Aero Squadron; Never activated; disbanded 31 May 1942	
662d Aero Squadron	December 1917	Formed as the 236th Aero Squadron; Supply Squadron, Aviation General Supply Depot, Kelly Field, Texas; Re-designated 662d Aero Squadron (Supply) February 1918; Demobilized: April 1919
662d Aero Squadron	Constituted in the Organized Reserve (New York) 1 October 1933, as the 662d Repair Squadron; >Consolidated on 4 December 1936, with 662d Aero Squadron; Never activated; disbanded 31 May 1942	
663d Aero Squadron	December 1917	Formed as the 237th Aero Squadron; Supply Squadron, Kelly Field, Texas; Re-designated 662d Aero Squadron (Supply) February 1918; Deployed to AEF May 1918 – December 1918; Demobilized: December 1918
663d Aero Squadron	Constituted in the Organized Reserve (Louisiana) 1 October 1933, as the 663d Repair Squadron; Consolidated on 4 December 1936, with 663d Aero Squadron; Never activated; disbanded 31 May 1942	
665th Aero Squadron	December 1917	Formed as 239th Aero Squadron; Supply Squadron, Kelly Field, Texas; Deployed to AEF May 1918 – December 1918; Demobilized: December 1918
665th Aero Squadron	Constituted in the Organized Reserve 1 October 1933, as the 665th Repair Squadron; Consolidated on 4 December 1936, with 665th Aero Squadron; Never activated; disbanded 31 May 1942	
675th Aero Squadron	September 1917	Formed as: 337th Aero Squadron; Aviation General Supply Depot squadron Kelly Field, Texas. Demobilized: April 1919
667th Aero Squadron	23 December 1917	Formed as 241st Aero Squadron; AEF: 13 April 1918 – June 1919; Supply Squadron; Air Service Production Center No. 2. Romorantin Aerodrome; Demobilized: June 1919
672d Aero Squadron	24 December 1917	Formed as 338th Aero Squadron; AEF: 15 August 1918 – December 1918; Supply Squadron; Training in England entire time Demobilized: December 1918
681st Aero Squadron	April 1918	Aviation General Supply Depot squadron Kelly Field, Texas. Demobilized: August 1919
684th Aero Squadron	October 1918	Aviation General Supply Depot squadron Kelly Field, Texas. Demobilized: August 1919

=== 800th Aero Squadron and above ===
Aero Squadron	Established	World War I
Aero Squadron	Notes/Subsequent History	
800th Aero Squadron	27 August 1917	Formed as 106th Aero Squadron; Re-designated: 800th Aero Squadron 1 July 1918; AEF: 2 January 1918 – 28 April 1919; Repair Squadron; Demobilized: 2 July 1919
800th Aero Squadron	Constituted in the National Guard in 1921 as the 135th Squadron (Observation) and allotted to the state of Alabama.; Organized and federally recognized as the 135th Squadron (Observation) on 21 January 1922, with personnel from the "Birmingham Escadrille" (a civilian flying club organized in 1919 by World War I ace Maj. James A. Meissner) and federally recognized at Roberts Field, Birmingham, Alabama; Consolidated on 20 October 1936, with the 106th (800th) Aero Squadron Currently Alabama ANG 106th Air Refueling Squadron	
801st Aero Squadron	27 August 1917	Formed as 107th Aero Squadron; Re-designated: 801st Aero Squadron 1 July 1918; AEF: 2 January 1918 – 8 March 1919; Repair Squadron; Demobilized: 18 March 1919
801st Aero Squadron	Constituted in the National Guard in 1921 as the 107th Squadron (Observation) and allotted to the state of Michigan; Organized and federally recognized on 7 May 1926, at Detroit, Michigan.; Currently Michigan ANG 107th Fighter Squadron	
802d Aero Squadron	27 August 1917	Formed as 108th Aero Squadron; Re-designated: 802d Aero Squadron 1 July 1918; AEF: 2 January 1918 – 27 May 1919; Repair Squadron; Demobilized: 11 June 1919
802d Aero Squadron	Constituted in the National Guard in 1921 as the 108th Squadron (Observation) and allotted to the state of Illinois; Organized and federally recognized on 1 July 1927, at the Municipal Airport, Chicago, Illinois.; Currently Illinois ANG 108th Air Refueling Squadron	
803d Aero Squadron	27 August 1917	Formed as 109th Aero Squadron; Re-designated: 803d Aero Squadron 1 July 1918; AEF: 2 January 1918 – 13 June 1919; Repair Squadron; Demobilized: 23 June 1919
803d Aero Squadron	Constituted in the National Guard in 1921 as the 109th Squadron (Observation) and allotted to the state of Minnesota; Organized on 21 November 1921, by re-designation of the Observation Squadron, Minnesota National Guard (organized in July 1920 and federally recognized on 17 January 1921, at Holman Municipal Airport in St. Paul, Minnesota).; Currently Minnesota ANG 109th Airlift Squadron	
804th Aero Squadron	27 August 1917	Formed as 110th Aero Squadron; Repair Squadron; Squadron K, Kelly Field, Texas; Demobilized: 18 November 1918
804th Aero Squadron	Constituted in the National Guard in 1921 as the 110th Squadron (Observation), and allotted to the state of Missouri; Organized and federally recognized on 23 June 1923, at Anglum Field, St. Louis, Missouri.; 1st Lt. Charles Lindbergh was a member of the squadron 1925–27; Consolidated on 20 October 1936, with the 109th (804th) Aero Squadron Currently Missouri ANG 110th Bomb Squadron	
805th Aero Squadron	23 November 1917	Formed as: 244th Aero Squadron; AEF: 15 January 1918 – June 1919; Repair Squadron; Demobilized: June 1919
805th Aero Squadron	Constituted in the Organized Reserve (Oregon) on 31 March 1924, as the 805th Observation Squadron; Consolidated on 8 December 1936, with the 805th Aero Squadron Mission was to provide aerial observation support to the Commanding General, Ninth Corps Area.; Inactivated on 11 June 1937; disbanded on 31 May 1942	
806th Aero Squadron	November 1917	Formed as: 245th Aero Squadron; AEF: February 1918 – December 1918; Repair Squadron; Demobilized: December 1918
806th Aero Squadron	Constituted in the Organized Reserve (New Jersey) on 31 March 1924, as the 806th Headquarters Squadron; Consolidated on 8 December 1936, with the 806th Aero Squadron; Inactivated on 3 November 1936; disbanded on 31 May 1942	
819th Aero Squadron	January 1918	Aviation repair squadron Kelly Field, Texas. Demobilized: August 1919
820th Aero Squadron	January 1918	Aviation repair squadron Kelly Field, Texas. Demobilized: August 1919
822d Aero Squadron	April 1918	AEF: April 1918 – July 1919; Re-designated: 6th Air Park; 4th Pursuit Group; Aircraft/Vehicle maintenance and supply unit Demobilized: July 1919
822d Aero Squadron	Constituted in the Army Air Service as Air Park No. 6, and assigned to the 9th Observation Group, Mitchel Field, New York on 30 August 1921; Re-designated as the 61st Service Squadron on 25 January 1923; Consolidated on 8 April 1924, with the 6th Air Park; Consolidated on 1 September 1936, with HHS, 9th Bombardment Group; Disbanded on 20 April 1944.	
825th Aero Squadron	28 January 1918	AEF: 1 September 1918 – November 1918; Repair Squadron; Air Service Production Center No. 2. Romorantin Aerodrome; Demobilized: December 1918
826th Aero Squadron	1 February 1918	AEF: 16 May 1918 – September 1919; Repair Squadron; Air Service Production Center No. 2. Romorantin Aerodrome; Demobilized: September 1919
827th Aero Squadron	11 February 1918	AEF: 18 May 1918 – June 1919; Repair Squadron; Air Service Production Center No. 2. Romorantin Aerodrome; Demobilized: June 1919
828th Aero Squadron	11 February 1918	AEF: September 1918 – September 1919; Repair Squadron; 2d Air Depot; Latrecey Aerodrome; Demobilized: September 1919
829th Aero Squadron	11 February 1918	AEF: 31 August 1918 – September 1919; Repair Squadron; Air Service Production Center No. 2. Romorantin Aerodrome; Demobilized: September 1919
830th Aero Squadron	11 February 1918	AEF: 15 September 1918 – September 1919; Repair Squadron; 2d Air Depot; Latrecey Aerodrome; Demobilized: September 1919
835th Aero Squadron	1 February 1918	AEF: 28 April 1918 – March 1919; Repair Squadron; 3d Air Depot; Courban Aerodrome; Demobilized: March 1919
837th Aero Squadron	1 February 1918	AEF: 14 May 1918 – March 1919; Repair Squadron; Various RAF Stations in England; Demobilized: March 1919
840th Aero Squadron	1 February 1918	AEF: 4 May 1918 – 4 March 1919; Repair Squadron; 2d Air Depot; Latrecey Aerodrome; Demobilized: March 1919
840th Aero Squadron	Constituted in the National Guard in 1921 as the 128th Observation Squadron and allotted to the state of Georgia; Reconstituted and consolidated (1944) with 128th Observation Squadron; Organized and federally recognized on 1 May 1941, Currently Georgia ANG 128th Airborne Command and Control Squadron	
864th Aero Squadron	March 1918	Organized at Air Service Mechanics School, St. Paul Minnesota as a Repair Squadron; Assigned to the Air Service Mechanics School; Demobilized in November 1919
864th Aero Squadron	Constituted in the Organized Reserve (Ohio) as the 864th Observation Squadron on 20 December 1928; Consolidated on 30 November 1936, with the 864th Aero Squadron; Inactivated by June 1937 at Akron by relief of personnel; disbanded on 31 May 1942	
865th Aero Squadron	March 1918	Organized at Love Field, Texas as a Repair Squadron; Assigned to the Aviation Repair Depot, Dallas, Texas; Demobilized in March 1919
865th Aero Squadron	Constituted in the Organized Reserve (Illinois) as the 865th Observation Squadron on 20 December 1928; Consolidated on 30 November 1936, with the 865th Aero Squadron; Typically conducted Inactive Training Period meetings at the Municipal Airport in Chicago; Disbanded on 31 May 1942	
875th Aero Squadron	1 July 1918	AEF: 1 July 1918 – June 1919; Organized in France; Repair Squadron; 1st Air Depot; Colombey-les-Belles Airdrome; Demobilized: June 1919
877th Aero Squadron	June 1918	Repair Squadron, Aviation Repair Depot Dallas, Texas; Demobilized: March 1919
877th Aero Squadron	Opened in September 1917, the Depot was attached to Love Field to repair wrecked aircraft and overhaul aircraft engines, closed March 1921	
878th Aero Squadron	June 1918	Repair Squadron, Aviation Repair Depot Dallas, Texas; Demobilized: March 1919
879th Aero Squadron	June 1918	Repair Squadron, Aviation Repair Depot No. 3, Montgomery, Alabama; Demobilized: March 1919
879th Aero Squadron	Depot was established in January 1918 to repair wrecked aircraft and overhaul aircraft engines. Closed in March 1919	
880th Aero Squadron	June 1918	Repair Squadron, Aviation Repair Depot No. 3, Montgomery, Alabama; Demobilized: March 1919
881st Aero Squadron	July 1918	Repair Squadron, McCook Field, Ohio; Re-designated "Squadron B", July 1918; Demobilized: March 1919
882d Aero Squadron	June 1918	Repair Squadron, Aviation Repair Depot No. 3, Montgomery, Alabama; Demobilized: March 1919
883d Aero Squadron	June 1918	Repair Squadron, Aviation Repair Depot No. 3, Montgomery, Alabama; Demobilized: March 1919
1099th Aero Squadron	20 May 1918	AEF: 20 May 1918 – March 1919; Organized in England; Repair Squadron; 3d Air Depot; Courban Aerodrome; Demobilized: March 1919
1101st Aero Squadron	13 April 1918	AEF: 13 April 1918 – February 1919; Organized in France; Air Service Replacement Squadron; 1st Air Depot; Colombey-les-Belles Airdrome; Demobilized: March 1919
1102d Aero Squadron	12 May 1918	AEF: 12 May 1918 – February 1919; Organized in France; Air Service Replacement Squadron; 1st Air Depot; Colombey-les-Belles Airdrome; Demobilized: March 1919
1103d Aero Squadron	9 May 1918	AEF: 9 May 1918 – February 1919; Organized in France; Air Service Replacement Squadron; 2d Aviation Instruction Center; Tours Aerodrome; Demobilized: March 1919
1104th Aero Squadron	22 May 1918	AEF: 22 May 1918 – June 1919; Organized in France; Air Service Replacement Squadron; 3d Aviation Instruction Center; Issoudun Aerodrome; Demobilized: July 1919
1105th Aero Squadron	26 May 1918	AEF: 26 May 1918 – July 1919; Organized in France; Air Service Replacement Squadron; 7th Aviation Instruction Center; Clermont-Ferrand Aerodrome; Demobilized: July 1919
1106th Aero Squadron	1 June 1918	AEF: 1 June 1918 – September 1919; Organized in France; Air Service Replacement Squadron; Air Service Production Center No. 2. Romorantin Aerodrome; Demobilized: September 1919
1107th Aero Squadron	27 July 1918	AEF: 27 July 1918 – July 1919; Organized in England; Air Service Replacement Squadron; Various RAF Stations in England; Demobilized in England: July 1919
1108th Aero Squadron	15 August 1918	AEF: 15 August 1918 – May 1919; Organized in France; Air Service Replacement Squadron; Air Service Production Center No. 2. Romorantin Aerodrome; Demobilized: June 1919
1110th Aero Squadron	August 1918	AEF: Organized and demobilized overseas troops Demobilized December 1918
1111th Aero Squadron	5 October 1918	AEF: 5 October 1918 – September 1919; Organized in Italy; Air Service Replacement Squadron; 8th Aviation Instruction Center; Turin, Italy; Demobilized: September 1919

=== Provisional squadrons, Spruce Production Division ===
Aero Squadron	Established	World War I
1st Prov. Squadron	March 1918	Organized as 1st Provisional Squadron at Vancouver Barracks, Washington; Re-designated 21st Spruce Squadron, July 1918 Assigned to Spruce Production Division; Demobilized: January 1919
2d Prov. Squadron	March 1918	Organized as 2d Provisional Squadron at Vancouver Barracks, Washington; Re-designated 22d Spruce Squadron, July 1918 Assigned to Spruce Production Division; Demobilized: January 1919
3d Prov. Squadron	March 1918	Organized as 3d Provisional Squadron at Vancouver Barracks, Washington; Re-designated 23d Spruce Squadron, July 1918 Assigned to Spruce Production Division; Demobilized: January 1919
4th Prov. Squadron	March 1918	Organized as 1st Provisional Squadron at Vancouver Barracks, Washington; Re-designated 24th Spruce Squadron, July 1918 Assigned to Spruce Production Division; Demobilized: January 1919
5th Prov. Squadron	March 1918	Organized as 5th Provisional Squadron at Vancouver Barracks, Washington; Re-designated 25th Spruce Squadron, July 1918 Assigned to Spruce Production Division; Demobilized: January 1919
6th Prov. Squadron	March 1918	Organized as 6th Provisional Squadron at Vancouver Barracks, Washington; Re-designated 26th Spruce Squadron, July 1918 Assigned to Spruce Production Division; Demobilized: January 1919
7th Prov. Squadron	March 1918	Organized as 7th Provisional Squadron at Vancouver Barracks, Washington; Re-designated 59th Spruce Squadron, July 1918, transferred to Raymond, Washington Assigned to Spruce Production Division; Demobilized: January 1919
8th Prov. Squadron	March 1918	Organized as 8th Provisional Squadron at Vancouver Barracks, Washington; Re-designated 75th Spruce Squadron, July 1918, transferred to Clatsop, Oregon Assigned to Spruce Production Division; Demobilized: January 1919
9th Prov. Squadron	March 1918	Organized as 9th Provisional Squadron at Vancouver Barracks, Washington; Re-designated 60th Spruce Squadron, July 1918, transferred to Hoquiam, Washington Assigned to Spruce Production Division; Demobilized: January 1919
11th Prov. Squadron	March 1918	Organized as 11th Provisional Squadron at Vancouver Barracks, Washington; Re-designated 75th Spruce Squadron, July 1918, transferred to Astoria, Oregon Assigned to Spruce Production Division; Demobilized: January 1919
12th Prov. Squadron	March 1918	Organized as 12th Provisional Squadron at Vancouver Barracks, Washington; Re-designated 76th Spruce Squadron, July 1918, transferred to Bridal Veil, Oregon Assigned to Spruce Production Division; Demobilized: January 1919
13th Prov. Squadron	April 1918	Organized as 13th Provisional Squadron at Vancouver Barracks, Washington; Re-designated 77th Spruce Squadron, July 1918, transferred to Clatsop, Oregon Assigned to Spruce Production Division; Demobilized: January 1919
14th Prov. Squadron	April 1918	Organized as 14th Provisional Squadron at Vancouver Barracks, Washington; Re-designated 78th Spruce Squadron, July 1918, transferred to Astoria, Oregon Assigned to Spruce Production Division; Demobilized: January 1919
15th Prov. Squadron	April 1918	Organized as 15th Provisional Squadron at Vancouver Barracks, Washington; Re-designated 61st Spruce Squadron, July 1918, transferred to Nemah, Washington Assigned to Spruce Production Division; Demobilized: January 1919
16th Prov. Squadron	April 1918	Organized as 16th Provisional Squadron at Vancouver Barracks, Washington; Re-designated 82d Spruce Squadron, July 1918, transferred to Yaquina, Oregon Assigned to Spruce Production Division; Demobilized: January 1919
17th Prov. Squadron	April 1918	Organized as 17th Provisional Squadron at Vancouver Barracks, Washington; Re-designated 62d Spruce Squadron, July 1918, transferred to Elma, Washington Assigned to Spruce Production Division; Demobilized: January 1919
18th Prov. Squadron	April 1918	Organized as 18th Provisional Squadron at Vancouver Barracks, Washington; Re-designated 83d Spruce Squadron, July 1918, transferred to South Beach, Oregon Assigned to Spruce Production Division; Demobilized: January 1919
19th Prov. Squadron	April 1918	Organized as 19th Provisional Squadron at Vancouver Barracks, Washington; Re-designated 63d Spruce Squadron, July 1918, transferred to Bay City, Washington Assigned to Spruce Production Division; Demobilized: January 1919
20th Prov. Squadron	April 1918	Organized as 20th Provisional Squadron at Vancouver Barracks, Washington; Re-designated 84th Spruce Squadron, July 1918, transferred to Waldport, Oregon Assigned to Spruce Production Division; Demobilized: January 1919
21st Prov. Squadron	May 1918	Organized as 21st Provisional Squadron at Vancouver Barracks, Washington; Re-designated 85th Spruce Squadron, July 1918, transferred to Waldport, Oregon Assigned to Spruce Production Division; Demobilized: January 1919
22d Prov. Squadron	May 1918	Organized as 22d Provisional Squadron at Vancouver Barracks, Washington; Re-designated 86th Spruce Squadron, July 1918, transferred to South Beach, Oregon Assigned to Spruce Production Division; Demobilized: January 1919
23d Prov. Squadron	June 1918	Organized as 23d Provisional Squadron at Vancouver Barracks, Washington; Re-designated 106th Spruce Squadron, July 1918, transferred to South Beach, Oregon Assigned to Spruce Production Division; Demobilized: January 1919
24th Prov. Squadron	June 1918	Organized as 24th Provisional Squadron at Vancouver Barracks, Washington; Re-designated 87th Spruce Squadron, July 1918, transferred to South Beach, Oregon Assigned to Spruce Production Division; Demobilized: January 1919
25th Prov. Squadron	June 1918	Organized as 25th Provisional Squadron at Vancouver Barracks, Washington; Re-designated 88th Spruce Squadron, July 1918, transferred to South Beach, Oregon Assigned to Spruce Production Division; Demobilized: January 1919
26th Prov. Squadron	June 1918	Organized as 26th Provisional Squadron at Vancouver Barracks, Washington; Re-designated 89th Spruce Squadron, July 1918, transferred to Waldport, Oregon Assigned to Spruce Production Division; Demobilized: January 1919
27th Prov. Squadron	June 1918	Organized as 27th Provisional Squadron at Vancouver Barracks, Washington; Re-designated 90th Spruce Squadron, July 1918, transferred to Newport, Oregon Assigned to Spruce Production Division; Demobilized: January 1919
28th Prov. Squadron	June 1918	Organized as 28th Provisional Squadron at Vancouver Barracks, Washington; Re-designated 91st Spruce Squadron, July 1918, transferred to Yaquina, Oregon Assigned to Spruce Production Division; Demobilized: January 1919
29th Prov. Squadron	June 1918	Organized as 29th Provisional Squadron at Vancouver Barracks, Washington; Re-designated 92d Spruce Squadron, July 1918, transferred to Agate Beach, Oregon Assigned to Spruce Production Division; Demobilized: January 1919
30th Prov. Squadron	June 1918	Organized as 30th Provisional Squadron at Vancouver Barracks, Washington; Re-designated 93d Spruce Squadron, July 1918, transferred to Newport, Oregon Assigned to Spruce Production Division; Demobilized: January 1919
31st Prov. Squadron	July 1918	Organized as 31st Provisional Squadron at Vancouver Barracks, Washington; Re-designated 27th Spruce Squadron, July 1918 Assigned to Spruce Production Division; Demobilized: January 1919
32d Prov. Squadron	July 1918	Organized as 32d Provisional Squadron at Vancouver Barracks, Washington; Re-designated 28th Spruce Squadron, July 1918 Assigned to Spruce Production Division; Demobilized: January 1919
33d Prov. Squadron	July 1918	Organized as 32d Provisional Squadron at Vancouver Barracks, Washington; Re-designated 94th Spruce Squadron, July 1918, transferred to South Beach, Oregon Assigned to Spruce Production Division; Demobilized: January 1919
34th Prov. Squadron	July 1918	Organized as 34th Provisional Squadron at Vancouver Barracks, Washington; Re-designated 95th Spruce Squadron, July 1918, transferred to Waldport, Oregon Assigned to Spruce Production Division; Demobilized: January 1919
35th Prov. Squadron	July 1918	Organized as 35th Provisional Squadron at Vancouver Barracks, Washington; Re-designated 103d Spruce Squadron, July 1918, transferred to Coquille, Oregon Assigned to Spruce Production Division; Demobilized: January 1919
36th Prov. Squadron	July 1918	Organized as 36th Provisional Squadron at Vancouver Barracks, Washington; Re-designated 96th Spruce Squadron, July 1918, transferred to South Beach, Oregon Assigned to Spruce Production Division; Demobilized: January 1919
37th Prov. Squadron	July 1918	Organized as 37th Provisional Squadron at Vancouver Barracks, Washington; Re-designated 97th Spruce Squadron, July 1918, transferred to Newport, Oregon Assigned to Spruce Production Division; Demobilized: January 1919
38th Prov. Squadron	July 1918	Organized as 38th Provisional Squadron at Vancouver Barracks, Washington; Re-designated 98th Spruce Squadron, July 1918, transferred to Newport, Oregon Assigned to Spruce Production Division; Demobilized: January 1919
39th Prov. Squadron	July 1918	Organized as 39th Provisional Squadron at Vancouver Barracks, Washington; Re-designated 99th Spruce Squadron, July 1918, transferred to South Beach, Oregon Assigned to Spruce Production Division; Demobilized: January 1919
40th Prov. Squadron	July 1918	Organized as 40th Provisional Squadron at Vancouver Barracks, Washington; Re-designated 100th Spruce Squadron, July 1918, transferred to South Beach, Oregon Assigned to Spruce Production Division; Demobilized: January 1919
41st Prov. Squadron	July 1918	Organized as 41st Provisional Squadron at Vancouver Barracks, Washington; Re-designated 40th Spruce Squadron, July 1918, transferred to Joyce, Washington Assigned to Spruce Production Division; Demobilized: January 1919
42d Prov. Squadron	July 1918	Organized as 42d Provisional Squadron at Vancouver Barracks, Washington; Re-designated 101st Spruce Squadron, July 1918, transferred to Toledo, Oregon Assigned to Spruce Production Division; Demobilized: January 1919
43d Prov. Squadron	July 1918	Organized as 43d Provisional Squadron at Vancouver Barracks, Washington; Re-designated 41st Spruce Squadron, July 1918, transferred to Joyce, Washington Assigned to Spruce Production Division; Demobilized: January 1919
44th Prov. Squadron	July 1918	Organized as 44th Provisional Squadron at Vancouver Barracks, Washington; Re-designated 64th Spruce Squadron, July 1918, transferred to Aberdeen, Washington Assigned to Spruce Production Division; Demobilized: January 1919
45th Prov. Squadron	July 1918	Organized as 45th Provisional Squadron at Vancouver Barracks, Washington; Re-designated 65th Spruce Squadron, July 1918, transferred to Raymond, Washington Assigned to Spruce Production Division; Demobilized: January 1919
46th Prov. Squadron	July 1918	Organized as 46th Provisional Squadron at Vancouver Barracks, Washington; Re-designated 107th Spruce Squadron, July 1918, transferred to Cosmopolis, Washington Assigned to Spruce Production Division; Demobilized: January 1919
47th Prov. Squadron	July 1918	Organized as 47th Provisional Squadron at Vancouver Barracks, Washington; Re-designated 108th Spruce Squadron, July 1918, transferred to Humptulips, Washington Assigned to Spruce Production Division; Demobilized: January 1919

== See also ==
- Aeronautical Division, U.S. Signal Corps 1 August 1907 – 18 July 1914
- Aviation Section, U.S. Signal Corps 18 July 1914 – 20 May 1918
- Division of Military Aeronautics 20 May 1918 – 24 May 1918
- United States Army Air Service 24 May 1918 – 2 July 1926
- United States Army Air Corps 2 July 1926 – 20 June 1941
- United States Army Air Forces 20 June 1941 – 18 September 1947
- United States Air Force 18 September 1947–present
- List of World War I flying aces from the United States
- List of Training Section Air Service airfields
- List of Air Service American Expeditionary Force aerodromes in France
- Organization of the Air Service of the American Expeditionary Force
- Spruce Production Division
