= Creech =

Creech may refer to:

== Places ==
- Creech, Arkansas, United States
- Creech, Kentucky, United States
- Creech Air Force Base, a United States Air Force base in Nevada
- Creech Grange, Steeple, Dorset, England
- Creech St Michael, Somerset, England

== People ==
- Creech (surname)

== Media ==
- The Creech, a comic book series
