= Field Eugene Kindley =

American aviator and World War I flying ace

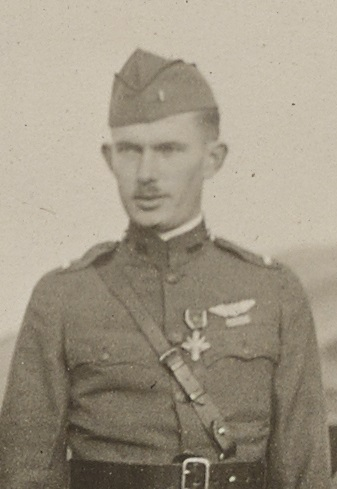
- 1st Lt. Field E. Kindley in Toul July 1918.
- Born: 13 March 1896; Pea Ridge, Arkansas
- Died: 2 February 1920 (aged 23); San Antonio, Texas
- Burial place: Hillcrest Cemetery, Gravette, Arkansas
- Military career
- Allegiance: United States; United Kingdom
- Branch: Kansas National Guard; Royal Air Force (United Kingdom); Air Service, United States Army
- Service years: 1917 – 1920
- Rank: Captain
- Units: Royal Air Force: No. 65 Squadron RAF; Air Service, United States Army: 148th Aero Squadron; 141st Aero Squadron; 94th Aero Squadron
- Commands: 141st Aero Squadron; 94th Aero Squadron
- Conflicts: World War I
- Awards: Distinguished Service Cross (United States); Distinguished Flying Cross (United Kingdom)

Captain Field Eugene Kindley (13 March 1896 – 2 February 1920) was an American aviator and World War I flying ace credited with twelve confirmed aerial victories.

== Early life ==
Field Eugene Kindley was born at Pea Ridge in northwestern Arkansas. Kindley's mother died when he was two years old and his father took a position in the Philippines, leaving Kindley to be raised by his grandmother in Bentonville, Arkansas until the age of seven. Kindley joined his father in Manila, where he lived until 1908, when he moved to Gravette, Arkansas to live with his uncle. After completing his education he moved to Coffeyville, Kansas where he became a partner in a motion picture theater.

== Military service ==
During his stay in Coffeyville, Kindley enlisted in the Kansas Army National Guard. Kindley volunteered for a transfer into the aviation branch of the United States Army Signal Corps. He attended the School of Military Aeronautics at the University of Illinois at Urbana-Champaign.

Kindley established himself as an unlucky and somewhat untalented flier, with a series of accidents, mechanical failures, and landing mishaps. He became part of the first group of American pilots to be transferred to England for combat training in 1917. In the spring of 1918, he completed training and commissioned as a first lieutenant in the United States Army Air Service.

On his first flight, he was assigned to ferry a Sopwith Camel from England to the western front, but crashed on the White Cliffs of Dover. Kindley was sent to hospital to recover. After his release, Kindley was assigned to the Royal Air Force's No. 65 Squadron, and scored his first aerial victory on 26 June 1918 over Albert, France shooting down the Pfalz D.III of Lt. Wilhelm Lehmann, commander of Jagdstaffel 5. The citation for his first DSC reads:

The President of the United States of America, authorized by Act of Congress, July 9, 1918, takes pleasure in presenting the Distinguished Service Cross to First Lieutenant (Air Service) Field Eugene Kindley, United States Army Air Service, for extraordinary heroism in action while serving with 148th Aero Squadron, 4th Pursuit Group, U.S. Army Air Service, A.E.F., near Bourion Wood, France, 24 September 1918. Lieutenant Kindley attacked a formation of seven hostile planes (type Fokker) and sent one crashing to the ground.

The second DSC citation reads:

The President of the United States of America, authorized by Act of Congress, July 9, 1918, takes pleasure in presenting a Bronze Oak Leaf Cluster in lieu of a Second Award of the Distinguished Service Cross to First Lieutenant (Air Service) Field Eugene Kindley, United States Army Air Service, for extraordinary heroism in action while serving with 148th Aero Squadron, 4th Pursuit Group, U.S. Army Air Service, A.E.F., near Marcoing, France, 27 September 1918: Flying at a low altitude, First Lieutenant Kindley bombed the railway at Marcoing and drove down an enemy balloon. He then attacked German troops at a low altitude and silenced a hostile machine gun, after which he shot down in flames an enemy plane (type Halberstadt) which had attacked him. Lieutenant Kindley has so far destroyed seven enemy aircraft and driven down three out of control.

In July 1918, the United States Army formed the 148th Aero Squadron and assigned Kindley to the unit. Kindley shot down a German Albatros D.V near Ypres and earned the unit its first kill. Kindley was the appointed commanding officer of the 148th and promoted to captain. While with the 148th he scored 11 confirmed kills.

His fourth kill on 13 August 1918 was the Jasta 11 Fokker D.VII of Lothar von Richthofen, brother of "The Red Baron," Manfred von Richthofen. Lothar von Richthofen, one of Germany's finest fliers with 40 confirmed air-to-air victories, was seriously wounded and never flew in combat again.

Kindley scored four more victories in early September. Then, during missions in late September 1918, Kindley earned the Distinguished Service Cross (DSC), Distinguished Service Cross with Oak Leaf Cluster and the British Distinguished Flying Cross.

On 24 September, he led a flight of Camels in a successful attack on seven Fokkers near Bourlon Wood, France. Three days later, Kindley earned the Oak Leaf Cluster to the DSC by dropping bombs on and strafing German infantry, destroying a German observation balloon, taking out a German machine gun nest, shooting down an enemy airplane, and scaring two Fokker biplanes away from fellow fliers even after his ammunition had been exhausted.

Confirmed victories
Date and time	Opponent	Location	Notes
26 June 1918, 2035 hrs	Pfalz D.III	East of Albert, Somme	Flown by Jasta 5 commander Wilhelm Lehmann {KIA}
13 July 1918, 0857 hrs	Albatros D.V	Poperinghe	
3 August 1918, 0930 hrs	Fokker D.VII	Southeast of Ostend	
13 August 1918, 1352 hrs	Fokker D.VII	North of Roye, Somme	Flown by Lothar von Richthofen {WIA}
2 September 1918, 1150 hrs	Fokker D.VII	South of Rumaucourt	
5 September 1918, 1720 hrs	Fokker D.VII	Saint-Quentin, Aisne Lake	
15 September 1918, 1050 hrs	Fokker D.VII	Epinoy	
17 September 1918, 1300 hrs	Fokker D.VII	Epinoy	
24 September 1918, 0728 hrs	Fokker D.VII	West of Cambrai	
26 September 1918, 1325 hrs	Fokker D.VII	East of Bourlon Wood	
27 September 1918, 0920 hrs	Halberstadt (Unspecified C-series)	Noyelles-sous-Lens/L'Escaut	
28 October 1918, 1205 hrs	Fokker D.VII	Villers-Pol	Shared with Lt. Jesse Creech

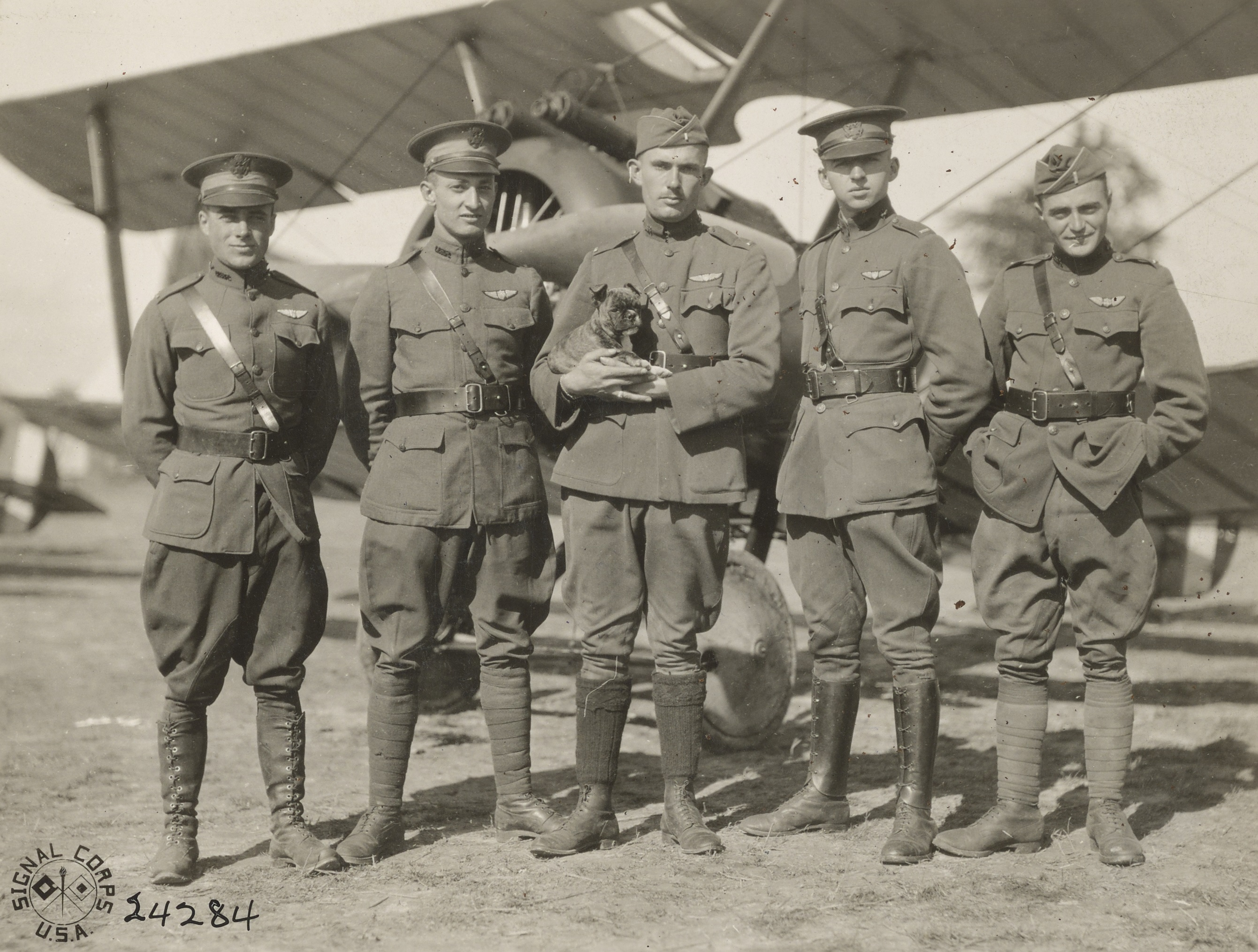
Lt. Kindley (center), 148th Aero Squadron, as flight commander with the members of his "A" Flight and his mascot dog "Porker" in September 1918.

== Postwar military career and death ==
In 1919, Kindley was offered a contract by a New York-based motion picture company to re-enact his war service. The company offered him $60 per day for two weeks which was an extremely high wage. Kindley refused the job because he thought it might interfere with his army career.

In early 1920, Kindley was the commanding officer of the 94th Aero Squadron.

Kindley died in a crash at Kelly Field near San Antonio, Texas during a demonstration flight for General John J. Pershing. A control cable snapped on the S.E.5 Kindley was flying. It stalled and fell from an altitude of 100 feet (30 m). Kindley is buried at Hillcrest Cemetery in Gravette, Arkansas. With his death, command of the 94th Aero Squadron was taken over by Captain J. O. Donaldson.

== Honors ==
A city park in Gravette is named for Kindley, as is the high school in Coffeyville, Kansas. Kindley Air Force Base, also known as Kindley Field, a World War II airfield in Bermuda, was named in his honor, as was Kindley Field in the Philippines, a small auxiliary airstrip on Corregidor. The Kindley home has been acquired by the Gravette City Museum. Kindley's personal effects are on display at the Arkansas Air Museum in Fayetteville, Arkansas. A Sopwith Camel F.1 said to be Kindley's and claimed to be the only surviving Camel in the United States, was used during the filming of The Blue Max, released in 1966, and had been on loan to the Aerospace Education Center in Little Rock, Arkansas. Aerospace Education Center permanently closed 1 Jan. 2011.

Arkansas Aviation Historical Society inducted Kindley into the Arkansas Aviation Hall of Fame in 1982.

== See also ==
- List of accidents and incidents involving military aircraft (pre-1925)

== Bibliography ==
- American Aces of World War I. Norman Franks, Harry Dempsey. Osprey Publishing, 2001. ISBN 1-84176-375-6, ISBN 978-1-84176-375-0.
