= Creech (surname) =

Creech is a surname, and may refer to:

- Billy J. Creech (born 1943), American politician from North Carolina
- Bob Creech (born 1949), American football player
- Cassandra Creech, American actress
- Don Creech, American actor
- Jesse Orin Creech (1895–1948), American World War I flying ace
- Jimmy Creech (born 1944), American Methodist minister and activist
- Morri Creech (born 1970), American poet
- Robert Creech (1928–2019), Canadian musician
- Rodney Creech, American politician from Ohio
- Sharon Creech (born 1945), American writer
- Thomas Creech (1659–1700), English translator
- Thomas Eugene Creech (born 1950), American murderer
- Wilbur L. Creech (1927–2003), United States Air Force general
- William Creech (1745–1815), Scottish publisher and politician
- William Creech Sr. (d.1845–1918), American philanthropist
- Wyatt Creech (born 1946), New Zealand politician

== See also ==
- Papa John Creach (1917–1994), American musician
- Creek (surname)
