= South Wallins, Kentucky =

Census-designated place in Kentucky, United States

- Census-designated place
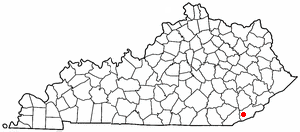
- Location of South Wallins, Kentucky
- Coordinates: 36°48′59″N 83°24′41″W
- Country: United States
- State: Kentucky
- County: Harlan

Area
  - Total: 6.34 sq mi (16.42 km^{2})
  - Land: 6.31 sq mi (16.35 km^{2})
  - Water: 0.027 sq mi (0.07 km^{2})
- Elevation: 1,142 ft (348 m)

Population (2020)
  - Total: 838
  - Density: 132.7/sq mi (51.25/km^{2})
- Time zone: UTC-5 (Eastern (EST))
  - Summer (DST): UTC-4 (EDT)
- FIPS code: 21-72255
- GNIS feature ID: 0503985

South Wallins is an unincorporated community and census-designated place (CDP) in Harlan County, Kentucky, United States. As of the 2020 census, South Wallins had a population of 838.

== Geography ==
South Wallins is located in western Harlan County at 36°48′59″N 83°24′41″W (36.816469, -83.411475), in the valley of Wallins Creek, a north-flowing tributary of the Cumberland River. The CDP is bordered to the north by the community of Wallins Creek. Kentucky Route 219 is the main road through the community, leading north (downstream) 1.5 miles (2.4 km) to U.S. Route 119 at Wallins Creek and south 3.5 miles (5.6 km) to its dead-end in Creech.

According to the United States Census Bureau, the South Wallins CDP has a total area of 6.3 square miles (16.4 km^{2}), of which 0.03 square miles (0.08 km^{2}), or 0.49%, are water.

== Demographics ==
Historical population
Census	Pop.	Note	%±
2020	838		—
U.S. Decennial Census

As of the census of 2000, there were 996 people, 405 households, and 287 families residing in the CDP. The population stayed largely the same throughout the years. In 2023, the population was 948. The population density was 158.4 inhabitants per square mile (61.2/km^{2}). There were 448 housing units at an average density of 71.2 per square mile (27.5/km^{2}). The racial makeup of the CDP was 97.29% White, 0.20% Native American, and 2.51% from two or more races. Hispanic or Latino of any race were 1.20% of the population.

There were 405 households, out of which 33.6% had children under the age of 18 living with them, 55.3% were married couples living together, 13.8% had a female householder with no husband present, and 28.9% were non-families. 26.7% of all households were made up of individuals, and 14.3% had someone living alone who was 65 years of age or older. The average household size was 2.46 and the average family size was 2.98.

In the CDP, the population was spread out, with 26.1% under the age of 18, 7.4% from 18 to 24, 27.4% from 25 to 44, 24.1% from 45 to 64, and 15.0% who were 65 years of age or older. The median age was 38 years. For every 100 females, there were 88.3 males. For every 100 females age 18 and over, there were 81.3 males.

The median income for a household in the CDP was $19,650, and the median income for a family was $23,083. Males had a median income of $30,417 versus $18,906 for females. The per capita income for the CDP was $9,357. About 32.6% of families and 36.7% of the population were below the poverty line, including 44.3% of those under age 18 and 15.5% of those age 65 or over.
