= 17th Aero Squadron =

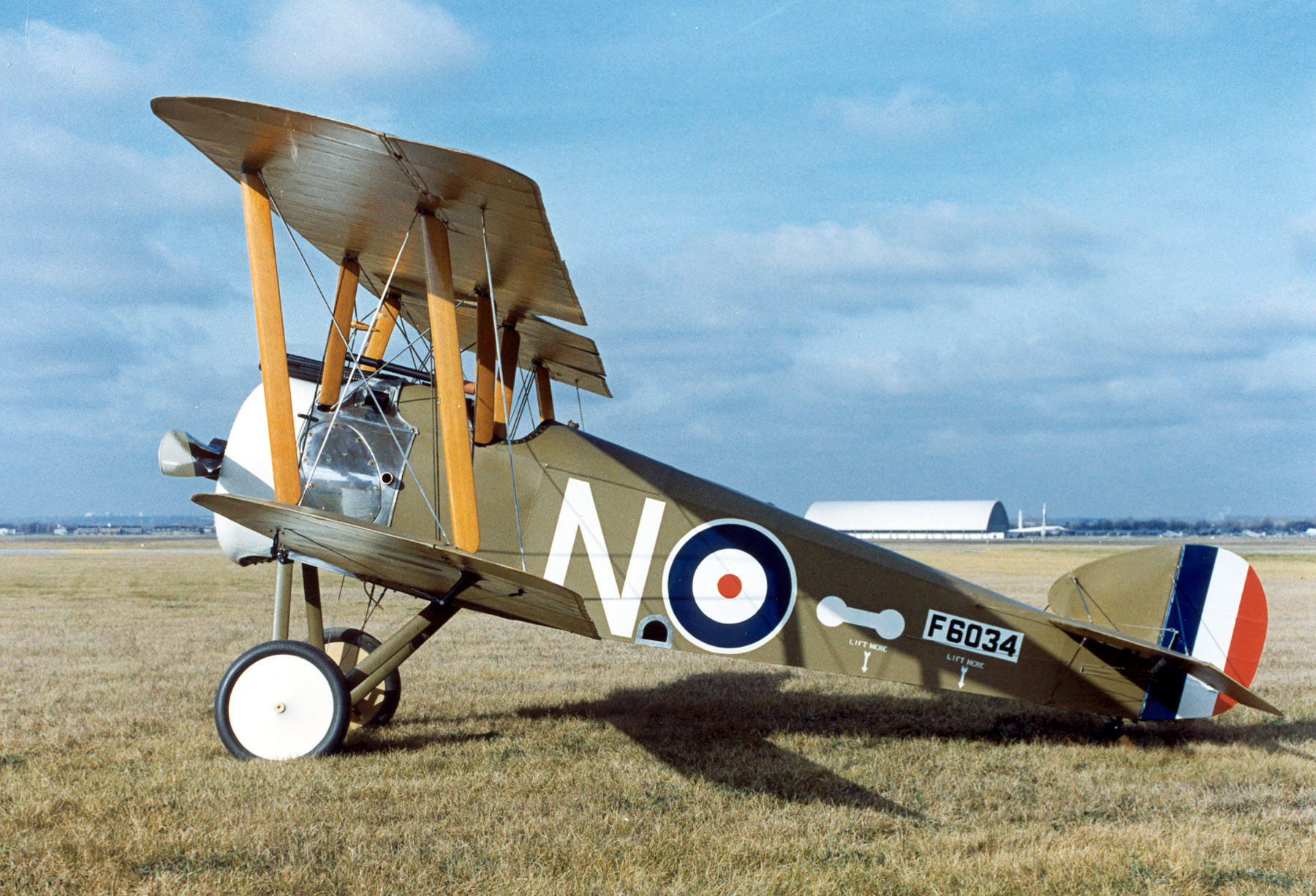
- Replica 17th Aero Squadron Sopwith F-1 Camel on display at the National Museum of the Air Force, made by USAF personnel from the original World War I factory drawings, completing it in 1974. The aircraft is painted and marked with the squadron's RAF white dumbbell painted on each side of the fuselage aft of the cockpit as the Camel flown by Lt. George A. Vaughn Jr.
- Active: 16 June 1917 – 1 April 1919
- Country: United States
- Branch: United States Army Air Service
- Type: Squadron
- Role: Pursuit
- Part of: American Expeditionary Forces (AEF); Attached to: Royal Air Force (RAF)
- Fuselage Code: White Dumbbell (RAF)
- Engagements: World War I

Commanders
- Notable commanders: Lt. Robert Oldys; Maj. Harold Fowler

Aircraft flown
- Fighter: Sopwith F-1 Camel; SPAD S.XIII
- Trainer: Curtiss JN-4

Service record
- Operations: Royal Air Force (65th Wing, III Brigade); 4th Pursuit Group; Western Front: 15 July-11 November 1918, France
- Victories: Enemy Aircraft shot down: 51; Enemy Balloons shot down: 3; Total Enemy Aircraft Destroyed: 54; Aces: 6 with probable 7th: Lt Howard Burdick, 8 (3 shared); Lt Lloyd A. Hamilton, 5 (3 shared)* * Hamilton had a total of 10 aerial victories, 5 of which were with the Royal Air Force before joining the 17th A.S.; Lt Howard C. Knotts, 6 (1 shared); Lt William D. Tipton,3 (1 shared)** ** Tipton had a total of 5 aerial victories, 2 of which were with the Royal Air Force before joining the 17th A.S.; Lt Robert M. Todd, 5 (2 shared); Lt George A. Vaughn, Jr., 6 (3 shared)*** *** Vaughn had a total of 13 aerial victories, 7 of which were with the Royal Air Force before joining the 17th A.S.; Lt Rodney D Williams, 5 (1 shared)**** **** Williams total of four planes and one balloon was disputed in a review of the historical records in 1968. A congressional examination has questioned that review. The US Air Force is currently reexamining his status. He was recognized as an Ace by the Air Force Review board 26 May 2017

The 17th Aero Squadron was a United States Army Air Service unit that fought on the Western Front during World War I.

As a Day Pursuit (Fighter) Squadron. its mission was to engage and clear enemy aircraft from the skies and provide escort to reconnaissance and bombardment squadrons over enemy territory. It also attacked enemy observation balloons, and perform close air support and tactical bombing attacks of enemy forces along the front lines.

The unit achieved a number of "firsts". It was the first United States Aero Squadron sent to Canada to be trained by the British; the first squadron to be completely trained prior to be sent overseas with its complete quota of trained pilots; the first squadron to be attached to British Royal Air Force squadrons and the first to be sent into combat.

In October 1918, the squadron was transferred to the United States Second Army 4th Pursuit Group. However, with Second Army's planned offensive drive on Metz cancelled due to the 1918 Armistice with Germany, the squadron saw no combat with Second Army. It returned to the United States and was demobilized on 1 April 1919 as part of the demobilization of the Air Service after the war.

On 17 October 1936, the World War I Aero squadron was consolidated with the United States Army Air Corps 17th Pursuit Squadron to preserve the lineage and history of the unit. Today, the United States Air Force 17th Weapons Squadron flies the F-15E Strike Eagle at Nellis Air Force Base, Nevada.

== History ==
=== Formation and initial training ===
The squadron was first organized as "Company A", Remount Station, Fort Sam Houston, Texas, on 13 May 1917, about a month after the declaration of war by President Woodrow Wilson. It was later re-designated "Company M", and later, "Company B". On 16 June, it again was re-designated as the 29th Provisional Aero Squadron, Aviation Section, Signal Corps, and then on 30 July, the 17th Aero Squadron. It was made of entirely of volunteers, and the majority of the unit had enlisted in the Army believing they would be flying officers. Unit members came from thirty-five states, Puerto Rico, Canada, and Mexico, and they were among the first to arrive at the new Kelly Field. The initial duties of the squadron consisted of surveying and building the first sewage and water system, and the first barracks and hangars of the new airfield.

On 2 August, the squadron was ordered to Toronto, Ontario, Canada for training under the British Royal Flying Corps (RFC). The previous month, a reciprocal agreement was made between the British and American governments under which the British would organize and train at the RFC's camps near Toronto the pilots and mechanics of ten Aero squadrons for overseas service. The 17th Aero Squadron was the first group to arrive under that agreement. The squadron arrived on 4 August at the recruit's depot at Leaside, Ontario. Here the men underwent three weeks of British drill and discipline. Then, the squadron was divided into detachments and went on to other camps in the area for training in rigging and fitting and all the trades involved in maintaining airplanes. The gunners and radio operators went to the School of Military Aeronautics at Toronto University; six went to the motor transport depot; seventy-five went to the RFC Airplane Repair Park; six to the flying field at Deseronto for training under the 43d Wing, RFC, and ninety-nine men went on to further training at Leaside.

In early October, the squadron was re-assembled at Leaside. New orders were received and the 17th was transferred to Camp Taliaferro, near Fort Worth, Texas on 12 October, for additional RFC training, although an advance party of twenty men had left for the same destination on 24 September. The squadron was assigned to Hicks Field, which afterward was given designation Taliaferro Field #1. Upon arrival, the airfield was in an unfinished state. The barracks were unfinished and the hangars for the airplanes were still to be built. Both officers and men lived in tents from which they had to chase an occasional tarantula. There was no telephones, no electricity and no transport. The training airplanes were still un-assembled in packing crates, and supplies were just beginning to arrive. However, within a week, the training aircraft, Curtiss JN-4 Jennies had been uncrated, assembled and flying. The flying cadets, who had been instructed in primary training during their time at Desoronto, were taught further details of flying. By 1 December, thirty cadets had completed their training and received commissions as First Lieutenants. The squadron's equipment has been received and on 20 December, the squadron received its overseas movement orders and departed for Garden City, New York for deployment.

Upon arrival in Garden City, it found New York in the grip of a coal shortage and a severe cold streak of weather. For two weeks, sailing was held up. The squadron was finally allowed to embark on 9 January at New York Haber pier 54 on the RMS Carmania, a former Cunard ocean liner that had been impressed as a troop ship. The Carmania sailed as part of a convoy of fourteen ships. Everything went according to schedule, and the ship arrived in Liverpool, England on 25 January. After disembarking, the squadron was marched from the docks to the Liverpool railway station where it boarded a London and North Western Railway train which took them to Winchester, Hampshire, near the south coast of England. Arriving in the late afternoon the squadron was moved to the Romsey Rest Camp.

Prior to leaving the United States, the squadron was informed that they were the first United States pursuit squadron to be deployed overseas; that they were well trained and organized; and the men were eager to do their part in the war. However now they were told by the British officers at Romsey that the squadron would be again split up into Flights and scatter the unit among Royal Flying Corps units in France for more training. It was arranged that each flight, would be attached to a separate RFC fighting squadron for duty and final training, while the pilots would be sent to various flying schools in Great Britain.

=== Training in France ===
After a month of confusion and very uncomfortable living conditions at Romsey on 9 February 1918, the Ground Echelon of the squadron sailed from Southampton for Le Havre, Upper Normandy, France, with a shipload of mules and horses. After landing, the squadron was met by a British officer and the Flights were sent off to their various destinations. Headquarters Flight was assigned to 24 Squadron at Matigny in the Somme; "A" Flight to 84 Squadron at Guizancourt, also in the Somme; "B" to 60 Squadron at Ste. Marie Capelle, near Hazebrouck on the Flanders front; and "C" to 56 Squadron at Baizieux Airdrome in Somme. All left at once except "B" Flight which followed on the 10th.

Thanks to the training the men received in the United States, the men of the 17th knew their aircraft well enough to be a help rather than a hindrance to the squadrons to which they were attached. Also, both officers and men realized they were a part of an experiment in training squadrons in the field, and that, with their ability to get on well with the British, the future of this method of training in no small measure depended for the following units coming from the United States. The 17th was completely detached from the United States Army Air Service; its flights were totally out of touch with each other. Occasionally an American officer would come by for an hour or so, at widely scattered intervals, to see how well they were "getting on". Each flight relied on the British for all of its necessary resources, including clothing and transport.

As a result of the German spring offensive, all of the Flights, with the exception of "B", were still at the Airdromes to which they were originally assigned. "B" Flight had moved to Bailleul Airdrome on the Somme, where it and 60 Squadron came under shell fire from the advancing German Army, although it suffered no casualties. On 23 March, the squadron moved to La Bellevue, near Arras, Pas-de-Calais, while the Flight left for Fienvillers, Somme, on 28 March, where the squadron had arrived the previous day. All of the Flights were now on the front involved in defending the line against the Germans and from the end of March, all Flights took part in a succession of movements carried out in the face of the enemy advance. The men of the 17th helped build new Airdromes; break them down and build still others as the British Army moved back.

Headquarters Flight began moving on the first day of the German Attack (21 March) when 24 Squadron moved from Matigny less than two hours before the Germans reached it, and some squadron members were still burning the quarters and hangars. While doing so, advance soldiers of the Germans had reached the airfield and they were under machine-gun fire. From Matigny, the Flight and Squadron moved to Bertangles; then from Bertangles to Conteville.

At Guizancourt, "A" Flight had received enemy artillery fire, and along with 64 Squadron had moved to Champien Aerodrome, near Roye; the last man got away only an hour and a half before the Germans arrived. From Roye it moved to La ferme du Vert Galand aerodrome on 24 March and then to Conteville, been billeted in Maison-Ponthieu on 29 March. By the time the front was held, "A", without 64 Squadron, only made one more move on 5 April to Bertangles.

The other two flights had much the same experience. "B" Flight had come down from Flanders to Bellevue with 60 Squadron just in time to stand by to move. All the British Squadrons supplies and property were divided up so that, if the need arose, they could be destroyed quickly in the order of their importance. Nothing, in spite of the danger, was lost. The Flight and Squadron moved to Fienvillers on 28 March where they remained until 18 April when it moved again to Boffles aerodrome, setting camp at Rougefay. "C" Flight moved only one time on 26 March from Baizieux to La ferme du Valheureux, near Candas.

During the three months of the German offensive, the RAF experienced the busiest and most dangerous times it had ever known, and during this period, the men of the 17th Aero Squadron learned much more than the maintenance of aircraft. They learned what it meant to send out patrols and move frequently from one airdrome to another at the same time. The knowledge that it gained in actual experience was more valuable than the knowledge they gained working with the RAF in maintaining aircraft. This became invaluable when the 17th began operating as an American unit with the RAF and word came in the middle of the night to move in five hours, they were fully capable of the task.

On 18 May it was decided that the Americans should be assigned to Sopwith Camel units. The mechanics would be given a month to master their overhaul and upkeep. Headquarters and "A" flights were assigned to 23 Squadron, then to 60 Squadron; "B" Flight was assigned to 46 Squadron and "C" Flight to 3 squadron. The men learned rapidly, and on 20 June the 17th Aero Squadron was re-assembled at Petite Synthe Aerodrome, near Dunkirk, to become a combat squadron and resume its identity as a squadron.

=== RAF combat operations ===
==== Petite Synthe ====
At Petite Synthe Airdrome the 17th received its official insignia, secret at the time, a white Dumbbell painted on each side of the fuselage aft of the cockpit. Later, in anticipation of its return to American command, the squadron adopted its own symbol, the "Great Snow Owl". However, it was with the Dumbbell that the squadron engaged in combat. The squadron was assigned to No. 65 Wing RAF for operations. However, No. 19 Squadron RAF also used the same basic form of "dumbbell" squadron marking, albeit with slightly larger circles at each end, on its own Sopwith Dolphin fighters from November 1917 onward through the summer of 1918, and is believed to have used them on its Dolphins right up to Armistice Day.

After several weeks of familiarization flights, the 17th Aero Squadron entered combat on 15 July 1918 for the first time. The front was very quiet. Lt. Rodney D. Williams brought down its first enemy airplane not far from Ostend, Belgium about 09:45 on 20 July when the squadron encountered a formation of five German Fokker biplanes at approximately 21,000 feet. Several bursts of machine-gun fire were fired at a rather long range at two different aircraft, and one German aircraft seemed to be hit as a tracer bullet exploded in the fuselage behind the pilot, however the plane went down under control. Another Fokker dove on Lt. Williams, firing short bursts. He maneuvered so he was about twenty-five yards to the enemy pilot's left rear and gave him a burst of forty or fifty bullets which appeared to strike the enemy plane at the pilot's seat. The enemy plane then turned on its back then fell out of the sky apparently out of control. That same day, the first casualty of the war was suffered by the squadron, when Lt. George Glenn was seen diving deeply south of Ostend after being attacked by a German Fokker D.VII.

From Petite Snythe Airdrome, the squadron engaged in combat operations almost daily afterward, frequently engaging German aircraft in aerial battles over the skies of northern France and Belgium. Missions included escorting RAF bomber squadrons attacking enemy positions in occupied areas. A major attack on a German airfield in Belgium, at Vessanaere, near Bruges was carried out with the 210 and 213 Squadrons RAF. The 17th rendezvoused with the squadrons over the English Channel and once assembled, the 17th was to provide cover from enemy aircraft interceptors. After several postponements, the attack was carried out on 13 August. The 17th took off before dawn and in conjunction with the RAF 5th Group squadrons, the bombers attacked the airfield from a low level, then proceeded to shoot at hangars and huts on the aerodrome. A gasoline dump was set on fire with six Fokker biplanes being set on fire on the ground, with an additional two being hit directly by bombs. Two hangars sere set on fire and another one severely damaged. The 17th circled the airdrome and attacked enemy aircraft and ground personnel preparing them to take off. The 17th claimed seven enemy aircraft destroyed on the ground. Later, it was confirmed that the raid destroyed a total of fourteen enemy aircraft. Many of the attacking aircraft were hit by ground fire but all managed to return without loss.

==== Auxi-le-Chateau ====
On 18 August the squadron was ordered to move to Auxi-le-Chateau Airdrome. The word came at 23:00 and the squadron pulled out at dawn. They arrived the next day, and were settled in enough to send the first combat patrol over the lines on 21 August, shooting down four enemy aircraft. The Chateau Thierry offensive was in full swing, with the squadron flying low bombing patrols, attacking gas balloons and infantry with their machine guns. Each pilot went on two patrols each day from dawn until disk. On 23 August, Lt. Williams was hit in the back and his petrol tank was pierced by enemy machine gun fire. Despite his wound, he put his finger in the petrol tank to plug the leak, then was able to land his aircraft successfully. The squadron over the next few days shot down one enemy gas balloon each day, with the exception of the 23d when they were put on low bombing dive and strafing missions all day. Attacks on the enemy was largely concentrated in the vicinity of Cambrai, but the congestion on the roads behind his lines presented opportunities for much greater damage to his morale by attacking trucks and troops on the highway from altitudes of less than a few hundred feet. When flying the low-level attacks, the 17th relied on other squadrons patrolling higher up to look out for the enemy's Fokkers, while the squadron received ground fire from the enemy below.

26 August was the squadron's most tragic day. It had rained during the night and a gusty wind had begun to blow at dawn and was getting stronger and gustier. Low clouds, with gaps of blue between them moved in from the southwest. The squadron was called for a patrol about 16:30 with a mission to attack a lot of enemy on the lines and some friendly "low-straffers" in trouble on the Bapaume-Cambrai road. The squadron took off and upon reaching the lines, shot down an enemy balloon, On crossing the line, five Fokkers were seen attacking friendly forces on the line. Immediately afterwards, a Camel was seen being attacked by the five Fokkers at a height of about 1,000 feet. The patrol at once went to the assistance of the Camel and attacked the enemy aircraft. Several other flights of Fokkers were then seen diving from the clouds. A general engagement took place in which still other flights of Fokkers came down from higher altitudes. Six 17th pilots were shot down and another only just succeed in getting back to the Auxi Airdrome with a number of Fokkers on his tail and firing continuously. All of the downed pilots (William Tipton, Robert Todd, Henry Frost, Laurence Roberts, Henry Jackson, and Howard Bittinger) were given up for loss, but about a month later a post card was sent from William Tipton that he, Robert Todd and Henry Frost had survived, along with George Wise who was captured on 24 August. However, Henry Frost had died of his wounds. The post card also confirmed that the patrol had downed three German planes, of which Tipton was credited for two and Todd one.

After the losses that day, the RAF kept the squadron out of combat for about a week. Several new aircraft arrived along with some new pilots being assigned. While the squadron operated from the Auxi Airdrome, often in conjunction with the 148th Aero Squadron, the line moved east rapidly and it was necessary for the squadron to establish an Advanced Landing Ground at Beugnatre on 10 September from which the squadron took up wireless interception and devoted itself to attacking enemy two-seater observation aircraft. A detail of mechanics were sent to Beugnatre and several hangars were erected. Beugnatre was a former British Airdrome that had been captured by the Germans and was severely damaged during its occupation. The fields were a mess of shell holes, rusty Nissen huts lined the road which were riddled by machine gun holes and had caved in. The ground mechanics and crew managed to fill in the shell holes and operations by the squadron flew from dusk to dawn until 20 September.

==== Soncamp ====
With the line advancing east and north, the squadron was again ordered to move to an airdrome near Doullens which was being vacated by No. 12 Squadron on 20 September. The day was cold and rainy with low clouds, however the aircraft took off and the trucks were loaded with stores and other equipment. Soncamp Aerodrome occupied the north side of a farm house, south of the typical French farming village of Sombrin, Pas-de-Calais. The farm buildings were enclosed in a large stone wall, perhaps the relic of a small convent, with a high archway into a farmyard. The hangars were permanent and of camouflaged corrugated iron. There were good huts as barracks for the enlisted men.

Flight operations begin on the 22d, and on the first morning patrol, fifteen Fokkers were seen diving on the squadron's "C" flight, outnumbering them five-to-one. The 17th's pilots, however, returned their fire and eventually about thirty aircraft were engaged in the aerial battle and downed six enemy aircraft. A Lt Tillinghast, was shot down in the battle. He turned up later in London with a remarkable story of how he was captured by the Germans and taken to a house in the rear of their lines. Being locked up in a room, he managed to escape through a hole in the roof and made his way from Valenciennes to Belgium, where he obtained a suit of civilian clothing. Friendly Belgians moved him from one home to another at night on an underground railway. Finally he reached Brussels, where he moved freely on the streets. He even went to the length, it seems, of taking a streetcar ride to a neighboring German Aerodrome that he inspected carefully and at length. Somewhere in Brussels he became friends with a Belgian engineer who ran the electric plant from which the current for charging the frontier wire barrier was generated. The engineer let him into all his official secrets and gave him a clippers and wire gloves. Having set the hour of his crossing over, the engineer gave him final instructions about making good his escape and managed to cross over onto our side of the line.

As the army kept moving forward, the line changed from day to day. The army was battling on the Canal du Nord, the Hindenburg Line, the Canal de l'Escaut and Cambrai. The 17th was in combat each and every day during the battle there, carrying out bombing missions and strafing enemy forces on the ground from low-level. As the Battle for Cambrai progressed, the squadron's patrols would attack large formations of enemy Fokkers by ambushing them in the clouds, or bait them by trying to pull them over friendly territory. The Germans also did the same to the squadron, as the German pilots were very aggressive and frequently the squadron wound up in air-to-air combat with them. The enemy were very good pilots and, as the squadron found out later, were one of the most famous of the German organizations and well known for their exploits on other fronts. On 24 September a formation of fourteen 17th aircraft saw, rather far off, an enemy formation of thirteen. A short while later two enemy two-seater observation planes were spotted and several of the squadron's aircraft dived down on them. However, it turned out they were 'bait' as shortly afterwards, a formation of sixteen Fokkers dived down on them without warning, while another flight of enemy aircraft waited for their best moment to pounce on the rest of the squadron. Four of the 17th's aircraft had their guns jam, however, ten others attacked the enemy and shot down five and another was driven out of control with no losses. Later, the 148th attacked the same flight of Fokkers, or what remained of them and shot down six more enemy aircraft.

During the greater part of October, the squadron brought "great discomfort" to the enemy in many ways, and broke up the organization of his retreat towards the German frontier in spite of low clouds and a drizzling rain on many days. The squadron reported much materiel to British Intelligence which made it possible for ground units to attack in his weakest spots.

==== Transfer to the AEF ====
On 25 October, the squadron was again ordered to prepare itself to move. Estourmel was selected as an Advanced Landing Ground and Exnes as the site of a new Aerodrome. However, new orders were received that the squadron was to "go south" which meant being transferred to the American sector and joining the American Expeditionary Forces (AEF). The news had a mixed reception, as the squadron wanted naturally to join its own forces, however, the squadron had been quite happy fighting with the RAF forces and learned their game and how to play it well.

The order came to turn in all British supplies and prepare to depart. This included the squadron's Sopwith Camels, as the squadron would be re-equipped by the AEF. RAF Brigadier General Charles Longcroft, flew over in his Camel and assembled the entire squadron in a hangar. He walked the ranks and spoke to many of the men and asked what their work had been in America and what they did as part of the squadron. He then read to all a letter from General Julian Byng, commander of the British Third Army expressing to the squadron his sincere appreciation for their excellent and hard work. The moment was impressive. Afterward, General Longcroft came to the Officer's mess and thanked each and every pilot and officer for their efforts in behalf of the Royal Air Force.

On 1 November the squadron entrained on the railhead at Saulty, proceeding on the long trip to Toul in the American Sector. On its arrival, the 17th Aero Squadron was assigned to the 4th Pursuit Group and was assigned to Croix de Metz Aerodrome on the north side of the city. The AEF assigned French SPAD S.XI aircraft to the squadron, but before the squadron was fully organized, the armistice with Germany was signed on 11 November and active operations by the squadron ended.

==== Demobilization ====
On 12 December 1918 orders were received from First Army for the squadron to report to the 1st Air Depot, Colombey-les-Belles Airdrome to turn in all of its supplies and equipment and was relieved from duty with the AEF. The squadron's SPAD aircraft were delivered to the American Air Service Acceptance Park No. 1 at Orly Aerodrome to be returned to the French. There practically all of the pilots and observers were detached from the squadron.

Personnel at Colombey were subsequently assigned to the commanding general, services of supply, and ordered to report to the staging camp at Nantes, France on 15 January 1919. There, personnel awaited scheduling to report to one of the base ports in France for transport to the United States. When the unit arrived back in New York City at the end of March, the 17th Aero Squadron demobilized.

=== Lineage ===
- Organized as 29th Provisional Aero Squadron on 16 June 1917

Redesignated 17th Aero Squadron on 30 July 1917
Redesignated 17th Aero Squadron (Pursuit) June 1918
Demobilized on 1 April 1919

- Reconstituted on 17 October 1936 and consolidated with the 17th Pursuit Squadron

=== Assignments ===
- Post Headquarters, Kelly Field, 16 June-4 August 1917
- Training Section, Air Service, 4 August-12 October 1917

Attached to the Royal Flying Corps for training, entire period

- Post Headquarters, Camp Taliaferro, Texas, 12 October-23 December 1917

Attached to the Royal Flying Corps for training, entire period

- Aviation Concentration Center, 23 December 1917 – 9 January 1918
- Air Service Headquarters, AEF, British Isles

Attached to: Royal Flying Corps/Royal Air Force for training: 11 February–June 1918 (RAF formed on 1 April)
Attached to: No. 65 Wing, Royal Air Force for operations, 20 June 1918
Attached to: No. 13 Wing, Royal Air Force for operations, 18 August-30 October 1918

- 4th Pursuit Group, 4–11 November 1918
- 1st Air Depot, AEF, 12 December 1918
- Commanding General, Services of Supply, 15 January 1919
- Eastern Department, 20 March 1919

=== Stations ===
- Kelly Field, Texas, 16 June 1917
- Toronto, Ontario, Canada, 4 August 1917

Detachment at: Deseronto, Ontario, c 28 August-3 October 1917
Detachment at: Camp Borden, Ontario, c 28 August-3 October 1917

- Hicks Field (#1), Camp Taliaferro, Texas, 12 October 1917
- Aviation Concentration Center, Garden City, New York, 23 December 1917 – 9 January 1918

Trans-Atlantic crossing: RMS Carmania'

- Liverpool, England, 25 January 1918
- Romsey Rest Camp, Winchester, England, 25 January 1918

Air Echelon attached to RAF for continued combat flight training

- Le Havre, France, 9 February 1918

Ground Echelon separated into Flights for support training with RFC/RAF

Headquarters Flight

- Attached to: No. 24 Squadron RAF

Matigny Airdrome, France, 9 February 1918
Bertangles Airdrome, France, 21 March 1918

"A" Flight

- Attached to: No. 84 Squadron RAF

Guizencourt Airdrome, France, 9 February 1918
Champien Airdrome, France, 21 March 1918
Ferme du Vert Galand Airdrome, France, 24 March 1918
Conteville Airdrome, France, 29 March 1918
Bertangles Airdrome, France, 5 April 1918

"B" Flight

- Attached to: No. 60 Squadron RAF

Ste. Marie Capelle Airdrome, France, 10 February 1918
Bailleul Airdrome, France, 23 March 1918
Fienvillers Airdrome, France, 28 March 1918
Boffles Airdrome, France, 18 April 1918

"C" Flight

- Attached to: No. 56 Squadron RAF

Baizieux Airdrome, France, 9 February 1918
Ferme du Valheureux, France, 26 March 1918

- Petite Synthe Aerodrome, France, 20 June 1918
- Auxi-le-Château Aerodrome, France, 19 August 1918

Detachment operated from Beugnâtre Aerodrome, France, 10–20 Sep 1918

- Soncamp Aerodrome, France, 20 September 1918
- Croix de Metz Aerodrome, Toul, France, 4 November 1918
- Colombey-les-Belles Airdrome, France, 12 December 1918
- Nantes, France, 15 Jan-7 Mar 1919
- Garden City, New York, c. 20 Mar-1 Apr 1919

=== Combat sectors and campaigns ===
Streamer	Sector/Campaign	Dates	Notes
	St. Quentin-Arras sector	11 February-20 March 1918	
	Somme Defensive Campaign	21 March-6 April 1918	
	Amiens-Arras Sector	7 April-20 June 1918	
	Nieuport-Ypres Sector (Belgium)	15 July-18 August 1918	
	Somme Offensive Campaign	21 August-28 October 1918	

=== Notable personnel ===
- Lt. Howard Burdick, DSC, DFC, SSC, 8 Victories
- Lt. Lloyd A. Hamilton, DSC, DFC, 10 Victories (KIA)
- Lt. Howard C. Knotts, DSC, DFC, SSC, 6 Victories (POW)
- Lt. Gerald P. Thomas, DSC (KIA)
- Lt. George T. Wise, 6 Victories (POW)
- Lt. William D. Tipton, DFC, 5 Victories (POW)
- Lt. Robert M. Todd, 5 Victories (POW)
- Lt. George A. Vaughn, DSC, DFC, 13 Victories
- Lt. Rodney D. Williams, SSC, 5 Victories (WIA)
- LT. George P. Glenn, (KIA – 20 July 1918)

US DSC: Distinguished Service Cross; British DFC: Distinguished Flying Cross; US Silver Star Citation: Silver Star Citation; KIA: Killed in Action; POW: Prisoner of War

== See also ==
- Organization of the Air Service of the American Expeditionary Force
- List of American aero squadrons
