= Jesse Orin Creech =

American World War I flying ace (1895–1948)

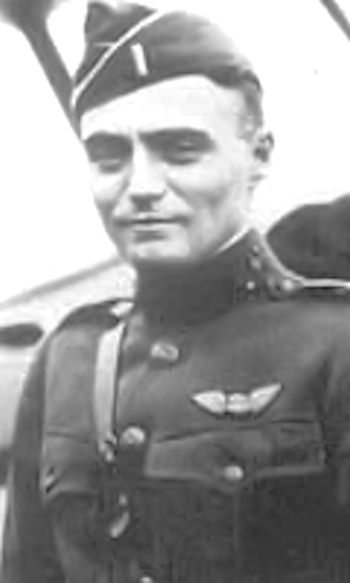
- Jesse Orin Creech, 1918
- Born: August 22, 1895; Harlan, Kentucky, United States
- Died: February 16, 1948 (aged 52); Louisville, Kentucky, USA
- Burial place: Lexington, Kentucky
- Military career
- Allegiance: United States
- Branch: Air Service, United States Army
- Service years: 1917 - 1918
- Rank: Lieutenant
- Unit: Air Service, United States Army: 148th Aero Squadron
- Conflicts: World War I
- Awards: Distinguished Service Cross, British Distinguished Flying Cross

Lieutenant Jesse Orin Creech was a World War I flying ace credited with seven aerial victories. He shot down the final victory of the war for his squadron.

Creech lived in Washington, DC before the war began and had studied at the University of Kansas and Cornell University. He joined the USAAS, and was posted to the 148th Aero Squadron as a Sopwith Camel pilot in Summer of 1918. Between 15 August and 28 October 1918, he destroyed six enemy airplanes and drove one down out of control, including one shared with Field Eugene Kindley.

== Honors and awards ==
Distinguished Service Cross (DSC)

The Distinguished Service Cross is presented to Jesse Orin Creech, First Lieutenant (Air Service), U.S. Army, for extraordinary heroism in action at Cambrai, France, September 26, 1918; south of Masnieres, France, September 28, 1918; and near Jenlain, France, October 28, 1918. Being on enemy patrol on September 26, 1918, when a large number of enemy airplanes were encountered, in the fight that ensued Lieutenant Creech shot down two of the enemy planes and save the commander of the patrol from being shot down. On October 28, 1918, near Jenlain, France, Lieutenant Creech's flight of 5 planes was attacked by 8 Fokker biplanes. In this encounter Lieutenant Creech also shot down 2 enemy planes. On September 28, 1918, south of Masnieres, France, Lieutenant Creech with his flight attacked an enemy balloon and compelled the observers to jump. Enemy troops were then attacked in close formation, causing many casualties and scattering all the troops. In all of these encounters Lieutenant Creech displayed high courage, great valor, and utter disregard of danger. He constantly went to the assistance of members of his flight and exposed himself with great fearlessness, and yet with all displayed keen judgment and tireless energy. He proved himself a leader of unusual ability, and was a constant inspiration to the members of his command. (General Orders No. 19, W.D., 1926)

Distinguished Flying Cross (DFC)

On 28 October 1918, this officer's flight attacked seven Fokker biplanes; after shooting one off his Flight Commander's tail, he attacked another which crashed NW of Jenlain. On another occasion in a general engagement, the EA dived through a cloud and Lt. Creech followed him and succeeded in getting another burst which caused the EA to crash near Bourlon Wood. This officer has served over four months with his Squadron and has destroyed six EA and driven down one out of control. He has often acted as patrol leader and shown great judgement and skill, and his gallantry and devotion to duty have at all times been very noteworthy.(Supplement to the London Gazette)

== See also ==
- List of World War I flying aces from the United States

== Bibliography ==
- American Aces of World War I. Norman Franks, Harry Dempsey. Osprey Publishing, 2001. ISBN 1-84176-375-6, ISBN 978-1-84176-375-0.
