= 4th Pursuit Group =

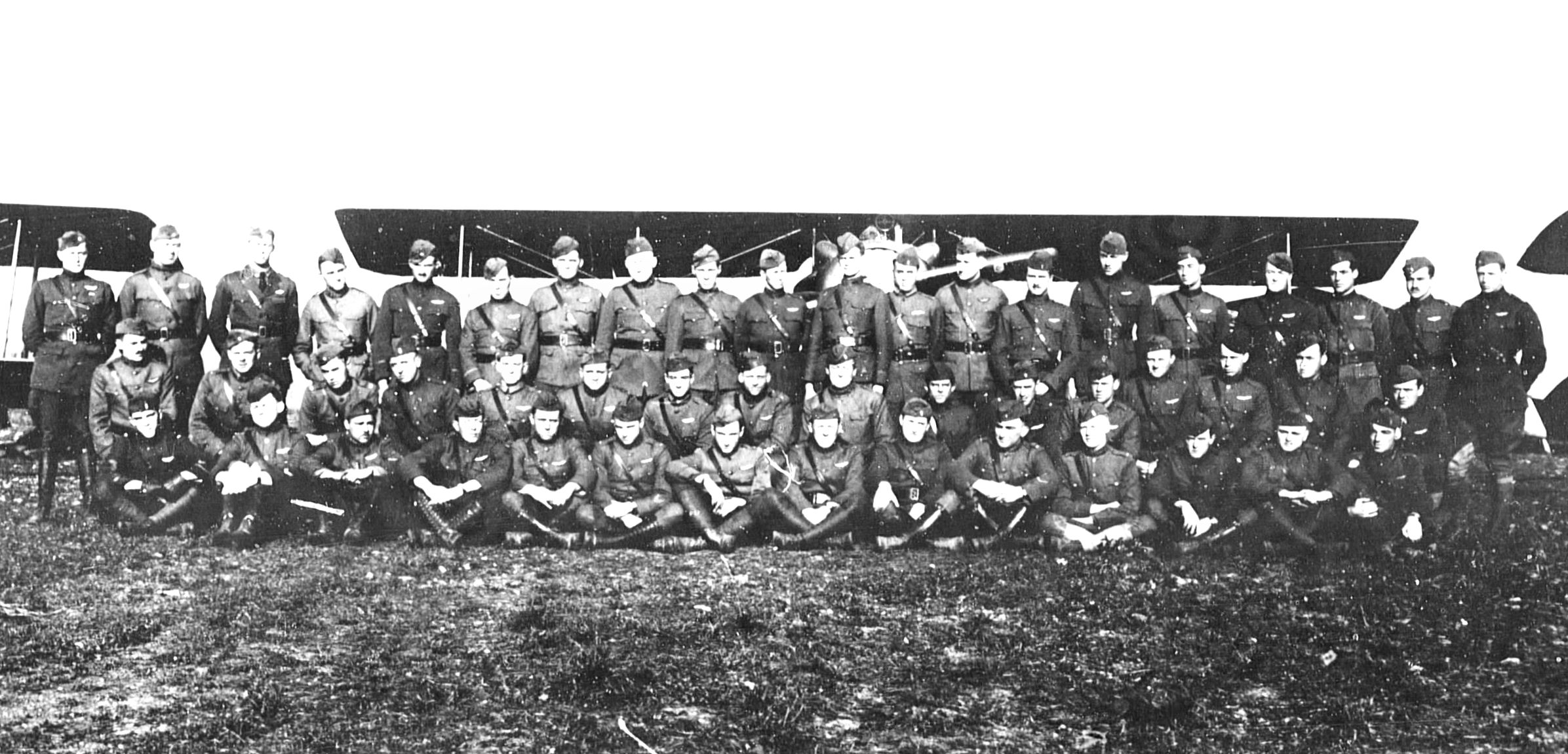
- 141st Aero Squadron, November 1918 Gengault Aerodrome (Toul), France
- Active: 1918–19
- Country: United States
- Branch: United States Army Air Service
- Type: Group
- Role: Command and control
- Part of: American Expeditionary Forces (AEF)
- Engagements: World War I

Insignia
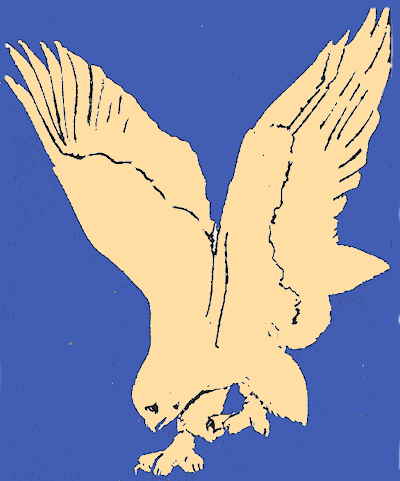
- 17th Aero Squadron Emblem

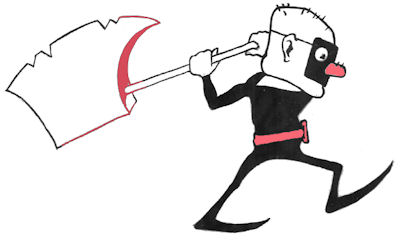
- 25th Aero Squadron Emblem

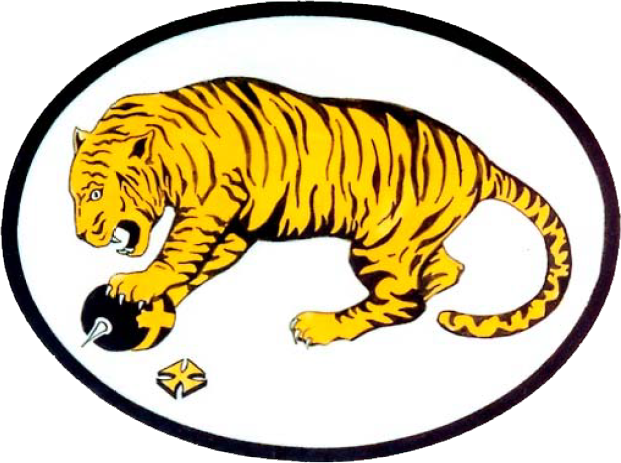
- 141st Aero Squadron Emblem

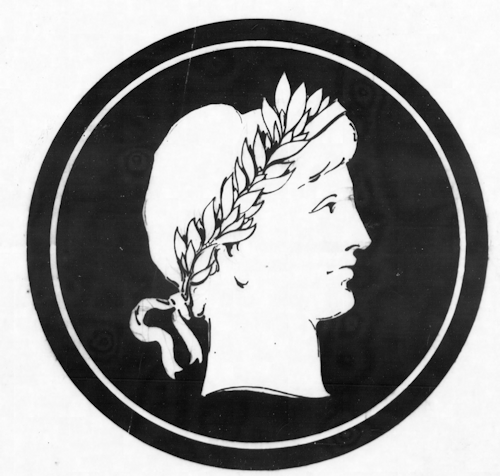
- 148th Aero Squadron Emblem

The 4th Pursuit Group was a United States Army Air Service unit that fought on the Western Front during World War I as part of the Air Service, Second United States Army. It was demobilized in France on 15 April 1919. There is no modern United States Air Force unit that shares its lineage and history.

== History ==
The group was organized on 26 October 1918 at Croix de Metz Aerodrome (Toul), France. On 27 October the 141st and 25th Aero Squadrons (Pursuit) were assigned to the unit. Both were new units, recently deployed to France and equipped with SPAD XIIIs. The Sixth Air Park was assigned to the Group on 30 October, it was equipped with trucks, cars, motorcycles and side-cars for the use of the Group.

The sector to be patrolled by the 4th PG was bounded on the west by Manheulles and Meilly-sur-Rouvres, and on the east by Custines, Landremont and Clémery. Operations began on 28 October when Captain Hobie Baker, 141st Squadron, engaged six enemy Fokkers near Prény and shot down one of them. Ten more enemy aircraft attacked the patrol from a higher altitude and the squadron managed to return to Allied lines without loss. Given the limited number of aircraft and pilots assigned to the Group, as many combat patrols as possible were flown each day.

On 4 November, the 17th and 148th Aero Squadrons were assigned to the Group, which brought the unit up to full strength. These two squadrons had previously been assigned to the British Royal Flying Corps and had been transferred to the Second Army and equipped with new SPAD XIII aircraft. On 5 November, a patrol of the 141st Squadron destroyed an enemy Halberstadt D.II aircraft near Hagéville. The enemy aircraft was returning from an aerial leaflet drop when attacked. Several days of bad weather kept the group grounded until the armistice on 11 November, after which no aircraft was permitted to cross into enemy territory.

After the Armistice with Germany and the conclusion of the war, squadron flying continued on a limited basis to keep the pilots proficient in their skills. However, the main endeavors of the Group was Army administrative paperwork. The 17th Aero Squadron left Toul for the 1st Air Depot at Colombey-les-Belles on 12 December. When the Second Army was ordered demobilized on 15 April 1919, the 25th and 148th Squadrons in their turn were ordered to proceed to the 1st Air Depot, to turn in all of their supplies and equipment and were relieved from duty with the AEF. Planes were delivered to the Air Service Production Center No. 2. at Romorantin Aerodrome. The 141st was transferred to the 5th Pursuit Group, Third Army for occupation duty in the Rhineland, Germany.

Personnel were subsequently assigned to the Commanding General, Services of Supply and ordered to report to one of several staging camps in France. There, personnel awaited scheduling to report to one of the Base Ports in France for transport to the United States and subsequent demobilization.

=== Lineage ===
- Organized in France as: 4th Pursuit Group on 26 October 1918

Demobilized in France on 15 April 1919

=== Assignments ===
- Second Army Air Service, 26 October 1918 – 15 April 1919

=== Components ===
- 17th Aero Squadron (Pursuit), 4 November 1918 – 12 December 1918
- 25th Aero Squadron (Pursuit), 27 October 1918 – 15 April 1919
- 141st Aero Squadron (Pursuit), 27 October 1918 – 15 April 1919
- 148th Aero Squadron (Pursuit), 4 November 1918 – 15 April 1919

=== Stations ===
- Croix de Metz Aerodrome (Toul), France, 26 October-15 April 1919

== See also ==
- Organization of the Air Service of the American Expeditionary Force
