= Howard Clayton Knotts =

American aviation lawyer and flying ace

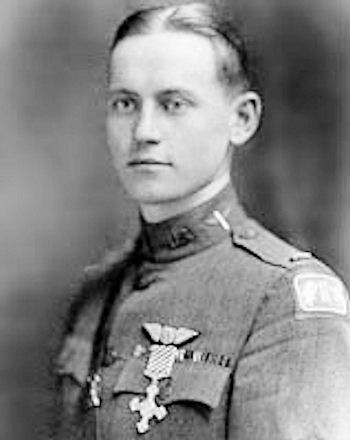
- Howard Clayton Knotts, 1918
- Born: 25 August 1895; Girard, Illinois, USA
- Died: 23 November 1942 (aged 47); Springfield, Illinois, USA
- Military career
- Allegiance: United States
- Branch: Air Service, United States Army
- Service years: 1917- 1919
- Rank: Lieutenant
- Units: 182nd Aero Squadron, 17th Aero Squadron
- Conflicts: World War I
- Awards: Distinguished Service Cross, British Distinguished Flying Cross

Howard Clayton Knotts was a prominent American aviation lawyer who served in World War I as a flying ace credited with six aerial victories.

== Early life ==
Howard Clayton Knotts (25 August 1895—23 November 1942) was the son of district attorney Edward Knotts, and was reared in Carlinville, Illinois. He graduated from college in 1915.

== World War I ==
The younger Knotts joined the Aviation Section, U.S. Signal Corps on 31 July 1917. Knotts was sent to Toronto for training. His first assignment was stateside, in the 182nd Aero Squadron; he joined them in Fort Worth on 5 November 1917. On 4 February 1918, he was commissioned a second lieutenant. On 14 August, he was forwarded to the 17th Aero Squadron in France. Once there, he used a Sopwith Camel to destroy six Fokker D.VIIs in the month from 25 August to 24 September 1918.

He was then shot down by ground fire on 14 October 1918, suffering a wound in his right foot in the process. He landed behind German lines and shot it out with five infantrymen, who finally captured him. Once placed on a train to the Prisoner of War camp, Knotts managed to set fire to the train, ruining seven Fokker D.VIIs. He narrowly escaped being shot for sabotage. Four days later, he temporarily escaped from the Mons prisoner of war camp. Sneaking off from a work detail, he hid in a French chateau being used as a German billet. He was then shipped to a camp at Soignies to sit out the war.

== Postwar ==
Knotts left the military in 1919. He graduated from Yale in 1921. On 25 June 1921, he married Charlotte Ann Sterling, the daughter of John Allen Sterling and niece of Thomas Sterling.

Knotts became a principal in his own law firm of Knotts and Dobbs. He was co-author of the Illinois Aeronautics Act of 1931. In 1934, he became chairman of the Illinois State Bar Association's section on aeronautical law. He was also chairman of the American Legion's national aeronautics commission. On 27 April 1937, he became editor of the Journal of Air Law published by Northwestern University.

Howard Clayton Knotts died of a heart attack on 23 November 1942.

== Honors and awards ==
Distinguished Service Cross (DSC)

The Distinguished Service Cross is presented to Howard Clayton Knotts, Second Lieutenant (Air Service), U.S. Army, for extraordinary heroism in action near Arieux, France, September 17, 1918. During a patrol flight 5 American planes were attacked by 20 enemy Fokkers. During the combat, when Lieutenant Knotts saw one of his comrades attacked by 7 enemy planes and in imminent danger of being shot down, he, although himself engaged with the enemy, went to the assistance of his comrade and attacked 2 of his immediate pursuers. In the fight which ensued he shot 1 of the enemy down in flames and forced the other out of control. His prompt act enabled his comrade to escape destruction, although his comrade's plane was so disabled that he made the allied lines with difficulty, crashing as he landed. General Orders No. 19, W.D., 1921

Distinguished Flying Cross (DFC)

On August 25, 1918, he shot down from two thousand feet, over the Bapaume-Cambrai Road, on Fokker biplane.

"On September 13, 1918, he shot down from four thousand feet, near Inchy-en-Artois, northeast of Bapaume, on Fokker biplane.

"On September 17, 1918, with Lieutenant William T. Clements, he shot down from four thousand feet, near Arleux, a Fokker biplane.

"On September 22, 1918, he shot down from six thousand feet, near Marquion (east by south of Arras), a Fokker biplane.

"On September 24, 1918, he shot down from six thousand feet, just north of Bourlon Wood, two Fokker biplanes; while flying alone on the afternoon of the same date, trying to confirm and locate an enemy aeroplane shot down by Lieutenant Campbell in the forenoon, he saw a detachment of enemy troops on the Bapaume-Cambrai Road and at once attacked them; as he dived upon them he noticed at the side of the road past which the troops were marching a large ammunition dump, into which he fired incendiary tracer bullets which started several fires and in a few moments the dump blew up. The explosion was seen by many pilots who were in the air at that time, and by observers on the ground some fifteen miles away.

"On October 8, 1918, having completed a low bombing attack on enemy troops in Awoingt on which his flight had been sent out, Lieutenant Knotts saw a closed German staff car passing along the road through the villages of Naves. Of his own accord and although subjected to heavy machine-gun fire from nests along the road, he followed and attacked the car from just above the tree tops as it rushed through the village until it left the road and turned over. He then noticed two enemy officers roll out of the car, one of whom lay where he fell, and returning shot the other officer who started to run away.

"Lieutenant Knotts' flying showed the greatest disregard of danger, and over and over again he did not hesitate to fly very low in spite of the fire from the ground, thereby bringing back valuable reconnaissance material and seriously harassing the enemy's movements during their retreat. Whilst so flying on October 4, 1918, his engine was put out of action by ground fire, east of Saulzoir, and he was made a prisoner. Whilst a prisoner in Germany he was subjected to great exposure and his physical condition has been such that he has been in hospital ever since his return.

== See also ==
- List of World War I flying aces from the United States

== Bibliography ==
- Above the Trenches: a Complete Record of the Fighter Aces and Units of the British Empire Air Forces 1915-1920. Christopher F. Shores, Norman L. R. Franks, Russell Guest. Grub Street, 1990. ISBN 0-948817-19-4, ISBN 978-0-948817-19-9.
- American Aces of World War I. Norman Franks, Harry Dempsey. Osprey Publishing, 2001. ISBN 1-84176-375-6, ISBN 978-1-84176-375-0.
- Over The Front: The Complete Record of the Fighter Aces and Units of the United States and French Air Services, 1914-1918 . Norman Franks, Frank Bailey. Grub Street Publishing, 2008. ISBN 0948817542 ISBN 978-0948817540
