= 148th Aero Squadron =

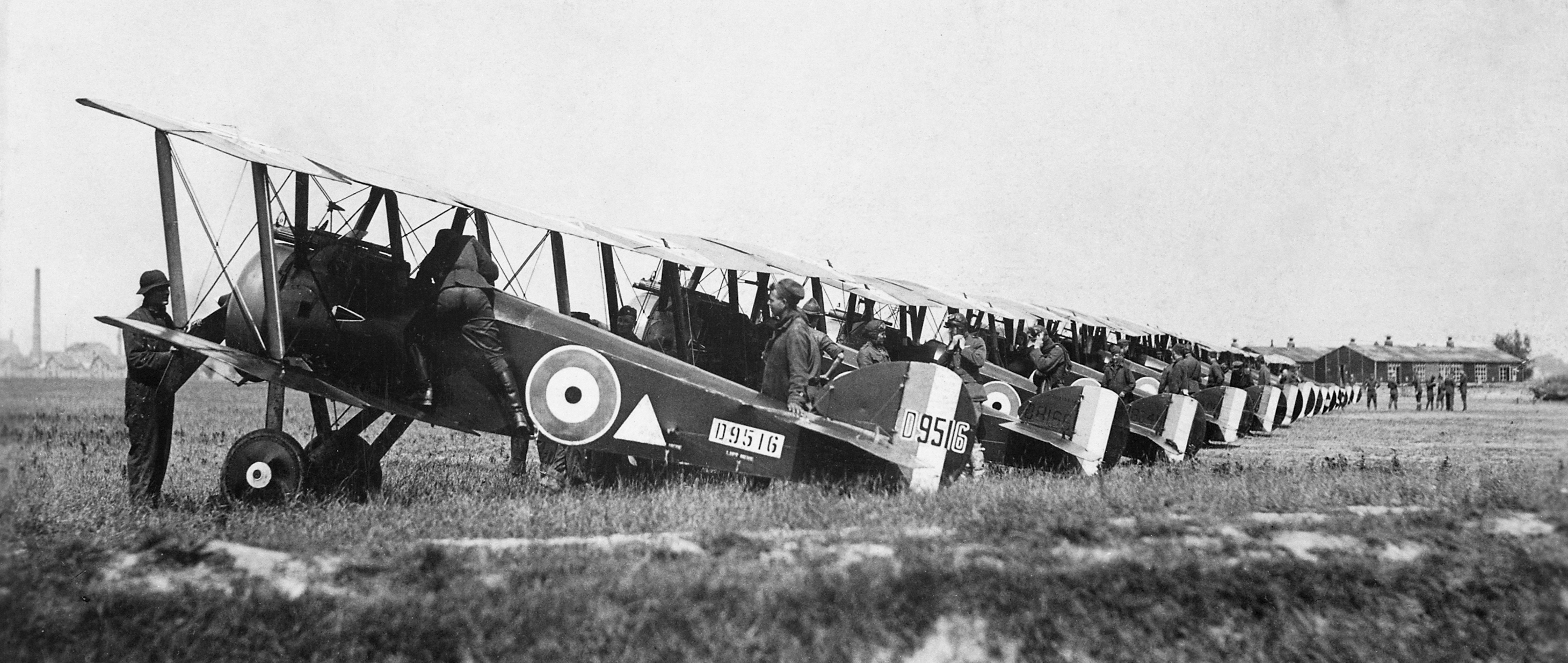
- 148th Aero Squadron preparing for a daylight raid on German trenches and cities, Petite Synthe, France, 6 August 1918
- Active: 11 November 1917 – 24 March 1919
- Country: United States
- Branch: United States Army Air Service
- Type: Squadron
- Role: Pursuit
- Part of: American Expeditionary Forces (AEF); Attached to: Royal Air Force (RAF)
- Fuselage Code: White Triangle (RAF)
- Engagements: World War I

Commanders
- Notable commanders: Captain Field E. Kindley

Insignia
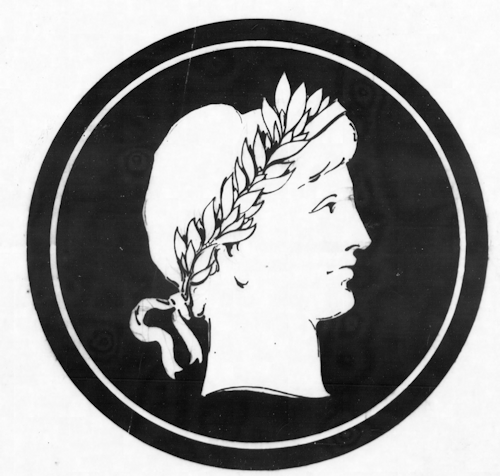
- 148th Aero Squadron Emblem

Aircraft flown
- Fighter: Sopwith F-1 Camel; SPAD S.XI
- Trainer: Curtiss JN-4

Service record
- Operations: Royal Air Force; 4th Pursuit Group; Western Front: 30 July-11 November 1918, France
- Victories: 70 enemy aircraft credited destroyed

The 148th Aero Squadron was a unit of the United States Army Air Service that fought on the Western Front during World War I.

As a day pursuit (fighter) squadron, its mission was to engage and clear enemy aircraft from the skies and provide escort to reconnaissance and bombardment squadrons over enemy territory. It also attacked enemy observation balloons, and perform close air support and tactical bombing attacks of enemy forces along the front lines.

The squadron flew combat operations attached to the British Royal Air Force between July and October 1918. In October 1918, the squadron was transferred to the United States Second Army 4th Pursuit Group. However, with Second Army's planned offensive drive on Metz cancelled due to the 1918 Armistice with Germany, the squadron saw no combat with Second Army.

After the 1918 Armistice with Germany, it was demobilized in 1919 as part of the Air Service, Second United States Army.

There is no modern United States Air Force unit that shares its lineage and history.

== History ==
=== Formation and initial training ===
The squadron was formed at Kelly Field, San Antonio, Texas, on 11 November 1917. The unit was organized with a full complement of men by 17 November, and was ordered transferred to the Royal Flying Corps training school at Camp Taliaferro, Fort Worth, Texas, for training. Camp Taliaferro was made up of three different airfields: Everman Field, to the south, Benbrook Field, to the west and Hicks Field to the north.

The squadron was initially assigned to Everman Field for instruction in airplane engines and rigging. After about a month, the support clerks, motor drivers, quartermasters, etc. were sent to Benbrook Field for training. The squadron was re-assembled at Hicks Field on 24 January. Flying training was begun with eighteen Curtiss JN-4 Jennies. A month was spent at Hicks and the flying cadets completed their training, were commissioned and assigned to duty as flying officers within the squadron. On 14 February 1918, orders were received for overseas movement and the squadron left Texas for Garden City, Long Island, New York, arriving on 19 February.

The overseas movement to Europe was made from New York Harbor, Pier 54, with the squadron being assigned to the RMS Olympic. The ship embarked on 25 February unescorted, its speed protecting it from submarine attacks. Two German submarines were sighted but no attacks were made. The ship reached Liverpool, England, on 5 March 1918. The squadron disembarked the ship the next day and marched to the Liverpool railway station where a train took them to Winchester, Hampshire, on the south coast of England. Winchester was reached that evening and the squadron detrained and marched to "Flower Down Rest Camp". A few days later, the squadron was moved to the Romsey Rest Camp. At Romsey, the flying officers were notified they would remain in England for further training at RAF flying schools. Training was received in the use of gas masks. On 19 March, the non-flying personnel were moved to the Southampton docks and loaded on a boat and an uncomfortable English Channel crossing was made to Le Havre, Upper Normandy, France.

=== Training in France ===
In France, the Ground Echelon of the squadron began a four-month training stage before entering combat as a unit. The 148th was attached to the Royal Air Force and separated into three divisions (Headquarters and "A" Flight; "B" Flight and "C" Flight), each being sent to a different RAF squadron.

==== "A" Flight ====
Headquarters and "A" Flight were attached to No. 54 Squadron RAF and left Le Havre on 20 March, one day before the German spring offensive on 21 March. The squadron was ordered to proceed to Ham Airdrome, boarding a train to Chaulnes. As the train pulled into the town, they were met by the sound of a continuous artillery barrage, and the Luftstreitkräfte (German Air Force) were bombarding Ham. The squadron was ordered off the train and the city was being flooded both with troops heading towards the battle and refugees streaming into the city. A temporary tent camp was pitched about 100 yards from the railway station. Later, a German Gotha bomber flew over, looking to attack the railway station. The bomb missed the station and instead hit the temporary tent camp, killing nine men of the detachment. Many others were wounded in the attack and one later died the next day. The remainder of the detachment was ordered to leave Chaulnes as soon as possible, and boarded a train for Amiens, just before the German Army captured Chaulnes.

By the time the detachment reached Amiens, the sounds of German bombs were all around and the detachment spent a very apprehensive night. On the afternoon of 23 March, the detachment was moved into the city where they spent a sleepless night in a schoolhouse, hearing the sounds of bombing all night around them. Orders again were received and the detachment boarded another train which took them back to Le Havre. At Le Havre, the detachment received a much needed rest. The squadron was moved to Étaples, arriving on 3 April, waiting for a day before moving on to Aire-sur-la-Lys, where an airdrome was garrisoned by 40 Sqn, RAF. At Aire, each man of the detachment was assigned to his particular duties and began training with an RAF counterpart.

With the ongoing German Spring Offensive, many personnel were detailed to move up to the front and help dismantle airfields. This duty was performed under fire of German artillery. At Aire, the detachment worked on SE-5 fighters. Training was rapid and the Americans were soon taking an active part in taking care of the aircraft as well as the routine work carried out by the RAF mechanics. About 12 April, the Germans began shelling the area near the Airdrome, and occasionally shrapnel would be thrown into the hangars and billets. At night, searchlights would be busy looking for the German Gotha bombers and anti-aircraft artillery would be firing into the sky.

After two months of training with 40 Sqn, the detachment was again moved to Serny and attached to 208 Sqn RAF, flying Sopwith Camels for training on that aircraft. On 30 June, the detachment was moved by truck to Cappelle Airdrome, Dunkirk, where the detachment was re-united with "B" and "C" Flights.

==== "B" Flight ====
"B" Flight was ordered to proceed to Albert, Picardy, and join No. 3 Squadron RAF. On 20 March the detachment entrained for Rouen and the next day it felt the effects of the German offensive. After a night at the Rouen Rest Camp, they boarded a troop train for Albert where first they were told to stay on the train and go on to the next station, Bapaume. In Albert, the sound of artillery was heard. A few miles out of the city, shells began to fall around the train. The shelling increased and damaged the road-bed in front of the train, so it began backing up and returning to Albert. On the way back, the shelling intensified and a German shell hit a signal tower along the side of the track. Once the train returned to Albert, a truck caravan met the detachment and transported the detachment to Albert Airdrome. At Albert, the detachment trained on the Sopwith Camel scout plane. With the German offensive in full swing, the squadron was continually working during every available hour of daylight trying to stop them. After a few days at the airfield and the Germans advancing, 3 Sqn received ordered to leave in a hurry. Orders were issued to take what could be taken, and burn what could not in order to prevent them from falling into the hands of the enemy. Men from the detachment worked frantically to load trucks and move out to safer territory.

On 29 March 3 Sqn reformed at Valheureux, where a new airdrome had just been built. Work was commenced at once to get the squadron's aircraft back into the air to stop the Germans. The detachment remained there for about a month with the RAF and a high level of comradeship had been achieved. On 5 June orders were received for the detachment to move to Remaisnil, Picardy for training with 70 Sqn RAF on the Sopwith Camel. As many of 70 Squadron's men were ill from influenza at the time, the detachment's help was greatly appreciated as they had been working on the Sopwith's rotary engines for nearly two months. The detachment worked with the squadron until the end of June when orders were received to report to Cappelle Airdrome, Dunkirk, where the 148th was re-forming.

==== "C" Flight ====
"C" Flight was ordered to La Gorgue, Nord-Pas-de-Calais and attach to 43 Sqn RAF. Upon detraining at La Gorgue, the men were marched several miles to Estaires to spend the night. At Estaires they saw their first sights of actual war, seeing anti-aircraft artillery firing at German planes in the sky. The detachment was rushed out of the town in the morning as a gas attack was threatening the town. They were quickly moved back to La Gorgue, where 43 Sqn had retreated to an airdrome outside of the town. By this time, La Gorgue was only about three miles behind the lines and shells screamed all over the airdrome. The men were assigned to flights to begin their duties of learning the care of the aircraft, being billeted in a little village close by. Shells continued to hit nearby and the village of Merville was so heavily bombed by the Germans that they were moved back to the Airfield. The next night saw a repetition of the bombing and shelling at 04:00 the RAF squadron was ordered out and to move to another airdrome at Champien. However arriving at Amiens, they were informed that Champien was in the hands of the Germans. They were ordered to move to Avesnes-le-Comte and establish an airdrome there. Once arrived, they spent the night in a barn while the Germans flew over and began bombing the town.

Rain the next day and for several days after curtailed air activity and the men of the detachment were sent to Bellevue to move some aircraft hangars to the new airdrome at Avesnes. There, unable to get transportation back they found shelter in an old convent, while again being subjected to German artillery fire. The detachment remained at Avesnes training while under artillery fire until 27 May when the squadron moved to Fouquerolles and on 28 May it again moved to Liettres. The detachment worked with the RAF squadron until the end of June when orders were received to report to Cappelle Airdrome, Dunkirk, where the 148th was re-forming.

=== RAF combat operations ===
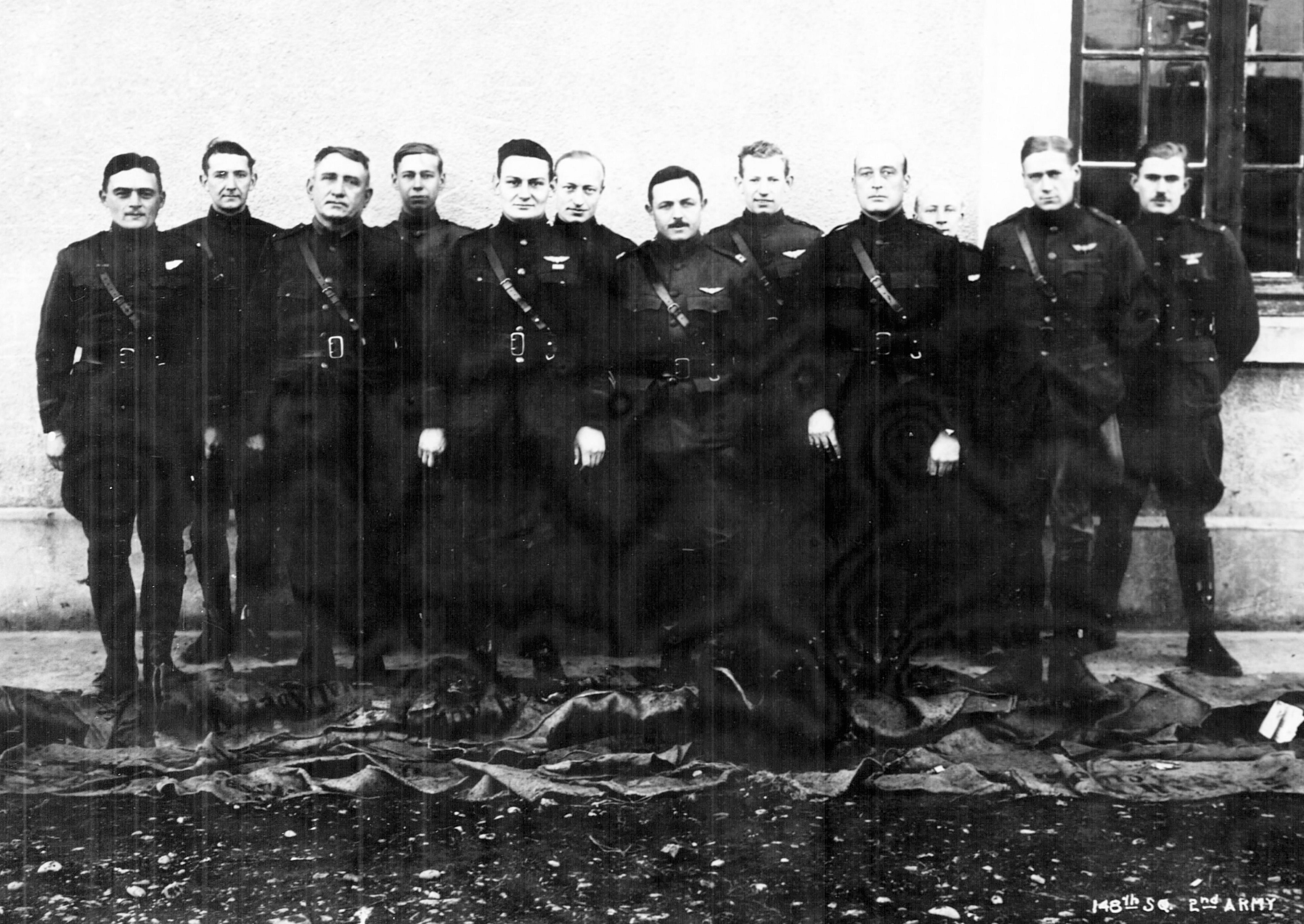
Pilots of the 148th Aero Squadron, Gengault Aerodrome, Toul, France

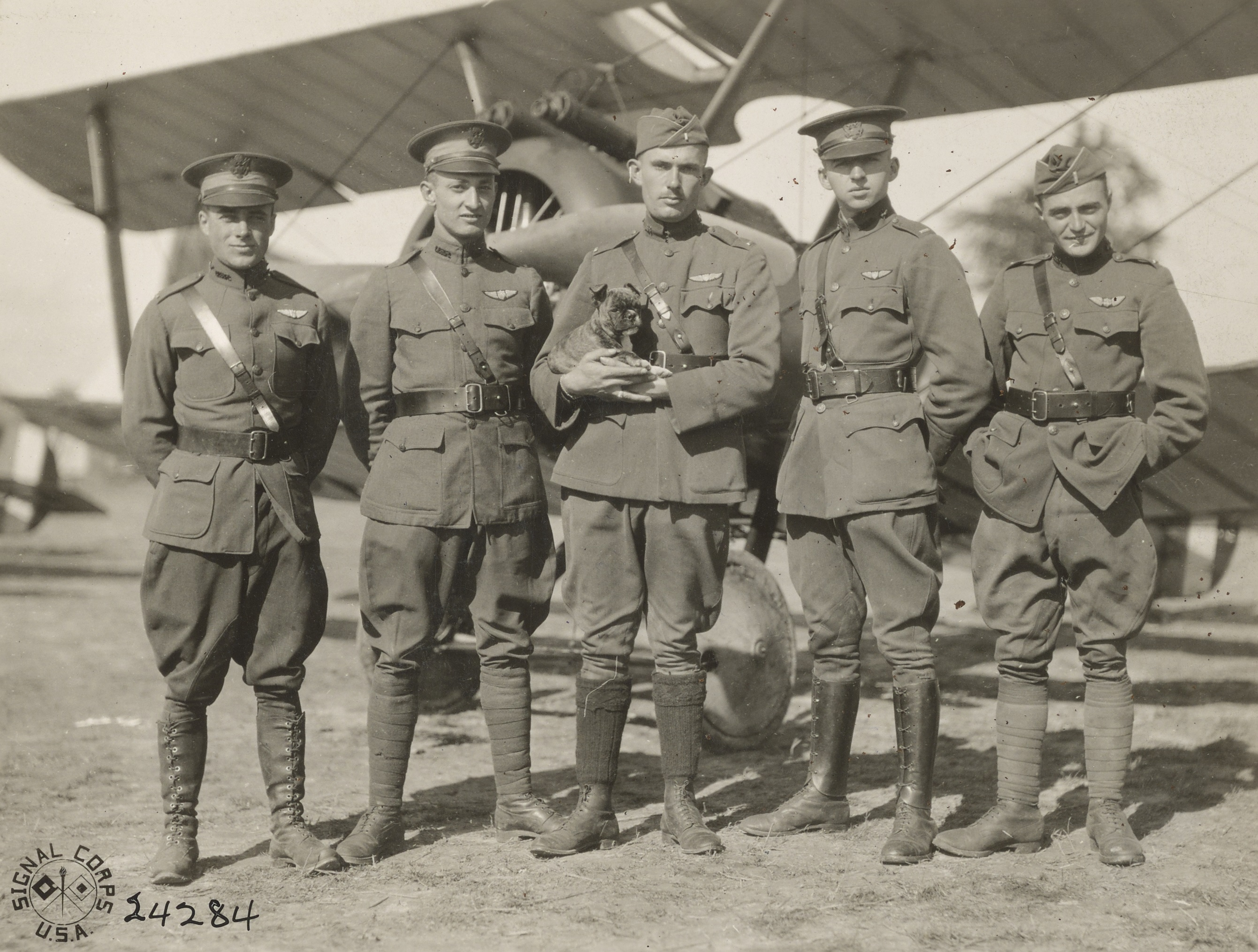
A" Flight of the 148th American Aero Squadron. L to R: Lt. Lawrence W. Wyly, Lt. Louis Rabe, Lt. Field E. Kindley flight commander, Lt. Walter B. Knox and Lt. Jesse Creech, Remaisnil, Somme, France. Kindley is holding his mascot dog "Porker". 14 September 1918

With the various Ground Echelon Flights reforming at Cappelle Airdrome, the Air Echelon of the squadron rejoined the squadron, having flown two to three months of combat flying attached to Royal Air Force squadrons. The 148th was assigned nineteen Sopwith Camel scout planes. Soon the pilots were practicing daily. The code assigned to the 148th was a large white triangle painted on the fuselage sides, along with a large white letter to identify the pilot of each aircraft. It was on the fourth practice patrols that the 148th Aero Squadron shot down its first German plane on 13 July 1918. Also at this time, the 17th Aero Squadron, which had been going through somewhat the same training that the 148th had, was assigned to a nearby airdrome and a friendly rivalry was formed between the two squadrons. Until the end of the war, the squadrons frequently worked together, protected each other and in certain instances saved individuals lives in one or the other squadron. The friendship was fostered by frequent dinners and the camaraderie of the airmen visiting each other's stations.

On 20 July the first offensive combat patrol over enemy lines was made, escorting a flight of British de Havilland DH-9 bombers to bomb the German-occupied Belgian cities of Zebrogge, Ostend and also Bruges, some 25 miles into enemy territory. The mission, consisting of over thirty aircraft, received anti-aircraft fire ("Archie" Bursts) continuously during the mission. High Explosive bombs were dropped on railway stations, ammunition dumps and other buildings. No losses were suffered on this first mission, and it was typical of the many that followed.

After three weeks of flying over the Nieuport-Ypres sector and with limited contact with German aircraft, it was decided that the 148th was ready for more active missions. On 11 August, the squadron was ordered to Allonville Airdrome, near Amiens, and it was attached to the Forth British Army who were operating on the front between Albert and Roye. The Germans had massed a large number of aircraft to hold the territory they had gained in their Spring Offensive. The British had also concentrated many squadrons in the sector, and day after day the sky was filled with a great number of planes from both sides. The Germans, outnumbered by the British and Americans and were equipped with various Fokker biplanes, being no mean adversaries.

On 13 August on their second patrol from Allonville, two flights from the squadron sighted six German aircraft as they approached the lines and engaged them in aerial combat. Nine 148th aircraft attacked the Germans, shooting down three with no losses. Two days later, the squadron's "A" and "B" Flights were attacked by fifteen Fokker biplanes which had flown over the lines. The two flights, one above the other, engaged the Fokkers, shooting down three of them. It was during this fight that the squadron suffered its first casualty. One aircraft was reported mission, and for three days no word could be obtained about his whereabouts. A message was received that the pilot had been wounded, not severely, and was forced to land. The wound, a bullet in the right forearm, was soon healed and the pilot returned to the squadron in about three weeks. After seven days at Allonville, the squadron was ordered to move to Remaisnil, to be attached to the RAF 13th Wing and the Third British Army.

Operating from Remaisnil Airdrome, the squadron engaged with the RAF in the British drive for Cambrai. Once captured, the German Army continued fierce resistance but yielded an additional 30 miles until their lines broke and eventually asked for an armistice. During this drive, the 148th flew dangerous bombing and strafing missions from low altitudes, to keep the German observation balloons out of the sky and attack the Fokkers so that British observation planes could continue to locate enemy forces to be attacked. Each day, the order would come from British Headquarters for low-level fights and drop bombs on selected targets where enemy troops were billeted. In returning, attack with machine gun fire any suitable ground target that might be presented. Other targets would be enemy trenches or roads along which vehicles and formations of troops could be attacked.

It was on 2 September that the 148th suffered its greatest losses of the war in one disastrous patrol. A superior number of Fokkers were attacking several artillery observation planes. The 148th, knowing it was their duty to protect the observation planes engaged the Fokkers who were ready for the fight. The squadron attacked with five aircraft against thirteen or fourteen Fokkers and soon the Germans, all good pilots, had most of the 148th's Camels in distress. Additional Fokkers then appeared out of the clouds until there were at least twenty of them. The 148th's Camels broke off the attack however, the Germans pursued the squadron and eventually shot down all five of the American aircraft. One pilot performed a crash-landing on the British side of the line and was unhurt, however not a word was heard from the other four. Over a month later, it was reported that three of the pilots had crashed in enemy territory and were prisoners of war. The fourth was wounded and later died.

With the continued British success on the ground, the Germans were pushed back to the "Hindenburg Line", the Canal du Nord. By this time, the 148th was ordered to move forward to the Baizieux Airdrome just to the west of Albert on 20 September. Baizieux was used by RAF scout squadrons as well as the 148th, including 201 Squadron RAF flying Bentley Camels and 60 Squadron flying SE-5s. The three squadrons became very close comrades and frequently worked together on patrol, with one or the other of the two RAF squadrons protecting the 148th when the squadron had dangerous work to do. Frequently, aircraft of the 17th Aero Squadron came into view and if close enough were greeted by a wave of the arm. During the first few days at Baizieux, large numbers of German Fokkers were engaged in combat frequently. The Germans were eager to fight and met the squadron head-on in aerial dogfights, on 24 September fifteen 148th Camels and twenty or more Fokkers fought in a single battle. The Germans knew they were good fliers and being brave men they tried to bring down the Americans singly. This, more than any one thing proved their undoing, as the pilots of the 148th watched their chances and whenever a pilot was in trouble, two or more helped him out, shooting the Fokker down One after the other the Fokkers were shot down, seven in all, and then as soon as it started, the enemies separated and the 148th returned home. Every aircraft of the squadron was filled with bullet holes, and several had to be condemned, but the Germans had been given a severe beating. Two days later, a similar hard-fought aerial battle was fought, with the 148th claiming a considerable number of the twenty-two enemy aircraft shot down that day.

After the two large dogfights on 24 and 26 September, German aerial resistance was negligible and the squadron began flying patrols carrying bombs and with orders to shoot up enemy targets on the ground with machine guns. When the line had reached the railroad running from Le Cateau northward to Denain, the 148th was again moved up, this time to Bapaume, on 15 October, now a cluster of ruins. As the end of October drew to a close, the rumors of when the squadron would be moved to the American front were coming thick and fast. Orders finally came through to stop combat missions on 26 October and leave for the American Sector in the South on 1 November.

On 28 October, the last day of flying with the RAF was a fitting climax to three months on the British Front, crammed full of aerial activity. It was also the last day of combat flying for the 148th Aero Squadron. On its last combat mission, the squadron brought down seven Fokker biplanes with no losses. It was a result of the training the pilots received from the RAF at their flying schools, then by actual combat flying at the front. On the morning of 28 October, the three flights of the squadron started on an offensive patrol, "A" Flight as the bottom flight, "C" Flight in the middle and "B" Flight as top flight. When the patrol approached the lines, the low flight was at 10,000 feet with the other two several thousand feet above. When the lines were reached, seven Fokkers were sighted at some distance east and a trap was laid for them. "A" Flight dropped down several hundred feet to keep away from the Fokkers to avoid detection. When there was a space of 7,000 feet between the bottom and middle flights, the three flights began a back and forth patrol along the lines, sometimes going in opposite directions. Gradually "A" Flight moved towards the Germans who were some distance above and east of them but still several thousand feet below the upper flights. At last, the Germans spotted "A" flight and moved to attack them from above. The Germans had hardly tipped their aircraft into a dive when the upper two flights of the 148th started down from the west to cut them off. They attacked the Fokkers by surprise and seven of the enemy aircraft had crashed to the ground in short order.

=== The American front ===
On 1 November, the squadron was ordered to move to Toul, and be attached to the 2d United States Army for duty. The unit boarded a train at Bapaume for the trip to Amiens; then a short stay and then on an overnight trip towards Paris. An hours wait on the outskirts of Paris in the morning then the train again pulled out, reaching Château-Thierry late in the afternoon. After a second uncomfortable night on the train, Toul was reached and the squadron detrained. Men and officers were marched to the Croix de Metz Aerodrome, which was to be the squadron's new home and from which it was intended to send out on combat patrols as soon as it could be re-equipped. It was hoped by the pilots that they might get British SE-5, but they were disappointed when they were assigned French SPAD S.XIs.

The pilots were used to the light, maneuverable Sopwith Camel, and flying the heavy, but powerful SPAD S.XI was like learning to fly again. Each and every pilot of the squadron after their first flight said the SPAD was the worst machine and the most dangerous that they had ever flown. However, after several flights, they began to become accustomed to its characteristics. By early November, there were many rumors of an armistice; however, the work of the squadron went on as usual. 11 November arrived and the squadron received the ordered that no more patrols would cross the lines, and the armistice with Germany had been signed. The war was over, and all that remained now was to wait for the place in the long waiting list of those who would board a ship that would take them back to the United States and home.

An interesting note is that on 12 November, the day after the armistice, Lieutenant Hogan was assigned to ferry one of the squadron's new SPAD to the supply depot at Colombey-les-Belles, south of Toul. Losing his way through his unfamiliarity with the area, he followed a river that he supposed would take him home. After half an hour's flying he knew he had lost his way, so he landed on an airdrome near a good-sized city on the river. He saw several German soldiers who he believed to be prisoners. They ran up to him and he spoke to them in German, asking where he was. However, before the Germans could answer, he recognized several German Fokker airplanes in hangars and he "nearly passed away". The Germans told him that he was in Metz and were not at all belligerent, one of them handing him a map and pointing to the city and the river. One German asked him wanted to know what an American was doing in Deutschland. Lt. Hogan took the map, thanked them hastily and took off in a hurry as his engine was running all the time. He found his way back to the river and found the airdrome at Toul. Thus, he was the first American to arrive in Metz after the armistice; however, no official report of the visit was ever made.

=== Demobilization ===
On 11 December 1918 orders were received from Second Army for the squadron to report to the 1st Air Depot, Colombey-les-Belles Airdrome to turn in all of its supplies and equipment and was relieved from duty with the AEF. The squadron's SPAD aircraft were delivered to the Air Service American Air Service Acceptance Park No. 1 at Orly Aerodrome to be returned to the French. There practically all of the pilots and observers were detached from the squadron.

Personnel at Colombey were subsequently assigned to the commanding general, services of supply. Further orders were received on 11 January and the next day the squadron left for a staging area at Aigrefeuille. There leaves were liberally granted, the squadron spending its time preparing for the return voyage home, and in daily hikes.

On 28 February, the squadron proceeded to the port of Saint-Nazaire, arriving on 1 March, being billeted at Embarkation Camp No. 2. There the men and officers underwent a physical examination, then were moved to Camp No. 1 where every squadron member was de-loused. The squadron remained at Saint-Nazaire for about a week, boarding a troop ship on 10 March, arriving in New York Harbor on the 22d. There the squadron was marched to Mitchel Field where it was demobilized and the men returned to civilian life.

On Monday, 6 April 2015, CNN posted a story about World War I soldier's graffiti found in a chalk mine in France. On one wall was the signature "HA Deanate, 148th Aero Squadron, USA, 150 Vermilyea Ave, New York City". Found on – http://www.cnn.com/2015/04/06/world/feat-wwi-graffiti-found/index.html

=== Lineage ===
- Organized as 148th Aero Squadron on 11 November 1917

Re-designated: 148th Aero Squadron (Pursuit), June 1918
Demobilized, 22–24 March 1919

=== Assignments ===
- Post Headquarters, Kelly Field, 11–17 November 1917
- Post Headquarters, Camp Taliaferro, 18 November 1917 – 14 February 1918

Attached to the Royal Flying Corps for training, 18 November 1917 – 14 February 1918

- Aviation Concentration Center, 10 February 1918
- Air Service Headquarters, AEF, British Isles

Attached to the Royal Flying Corps for training, 21 March – 30 June 1918

- Headquarters, Chief of Air Service, AEF

Attached to the Royal Flying Corps for operations, 30 June – 30 October 1918

- 4th Pursuit Group, 3 November 1918
- 1st Air Depot, 11 December 1918
- Commanding General, Services of Supply, 11 January – 10 March 1919
- Post Headquarters, Mitchell Field, 22–24 March 1919

=== Stations ===
- Kelly Field, Texas, 11–17 November 1917
- Barron Field (#3), Camp Taliaferro, Texas, 18 November – 24 January 1918

Detachment at: Benbrook Field (#2), Camp Taliaferro, Texas, 18 December – 24 January 1918

- Hicks Field, (#1), Camp Taliaferro, Texas, 24 January – 14 February 1918
- Aviation Concentration Center, Garden City, New York, 19–25 February 1918

Trans-Atlantic crossing: RMS Olympic (HMS 527)

- Liverpool, England, 5 March 1918
- Flower Down RC, Winchester, England, 6 March 1918
- Romsey RC, Winchester, England, 10 March 1918

Air Echelon attached to RAF for continued combat flight training

- Le Havre, France, 19 March 1918

Ground Echelon separated into Flights for support training with RAF

Headquarters and "A" Flight

- Attached to: No. 40 Squadron RAF

Aire-sur-la-Lys Airdrome, France, 4 April – 31 May 1918

- Attached to: No. 208 Squadron RAF

Serny Airdrome, France, 1–29 June 1918

"B" Flight

- Attached to: No. 3 Squadron RAF

Albert Airdrome, France, 21–29 March 1918
Valheureux Airdrome, France, 29 March – 5 June

- Attached to: No. 70 Squadron RAF

Remaisnil Airdrome, France, 5–30 June 1918

"C" Flight

- Attached to: No. 43 Squadron RAF

La Gorgue Airdrome, France, 23–25 March 1918
Avesnes-le-Comte Airdrome, France, 27 March – 27 May 1918
Liettres Airdrome, France, 28 May – 30 June 1918

- Air and Ground Echelons of squadron reformed

Cappelle Airdrome, Dunkirk, France, 30 June – 22 July

- Allonville Aerodrome, France, 11–18 August 1918
- Remaisnil Aerodrome, France, 18 August – 20 September 1918
- Baizieux Airdrome, France, 20 September – 15 October 1918
- Bapaume Airdrome, France, 15–30 October 1918
- Croix de Metz Aerodrome, Toul, France, 3 November 1918
- Colombey-les-Belles Airdrome, 18 December 1918
- Aigrefeuille, France, 11 January 1919
- Saint-Nazaire, France, 1–10 March 1919
- Mitchell Field, New York, 22–24 March 1919

=== Combat sectors and campaigns ===
Streamer	Sector/Campaign	Dates	Notes
	Somme Defensive Campaign	21 March – 6 April 1918	
	Amiens-Arras Sector	7 April – 20 June 1918	
	Nieuport-Ypres Sector (Belgium)	15 July – 18 August 1918	
	Somme Offensive Campaign	21 August-28 October 1918	

=== Operational statistics ===
For the period, 22 July – 28 October 1918

- Number of enemy aircraft destroyed and confirmed, 47
- Number of enemy aircraft driven out of control and confirmed, 19
- Number of enemy aircraft destroyed and driven down out of control, 66
- Number of days on which offensive patrols were sent over the lines, 71
- Number of aircraft sent out on offensive patrol, 971
- Number of bombs dropped, 1,499
- Number of rounds fired on enemy targets, 583,000

=== Notable personnel/decorations ===
- Individual citations:

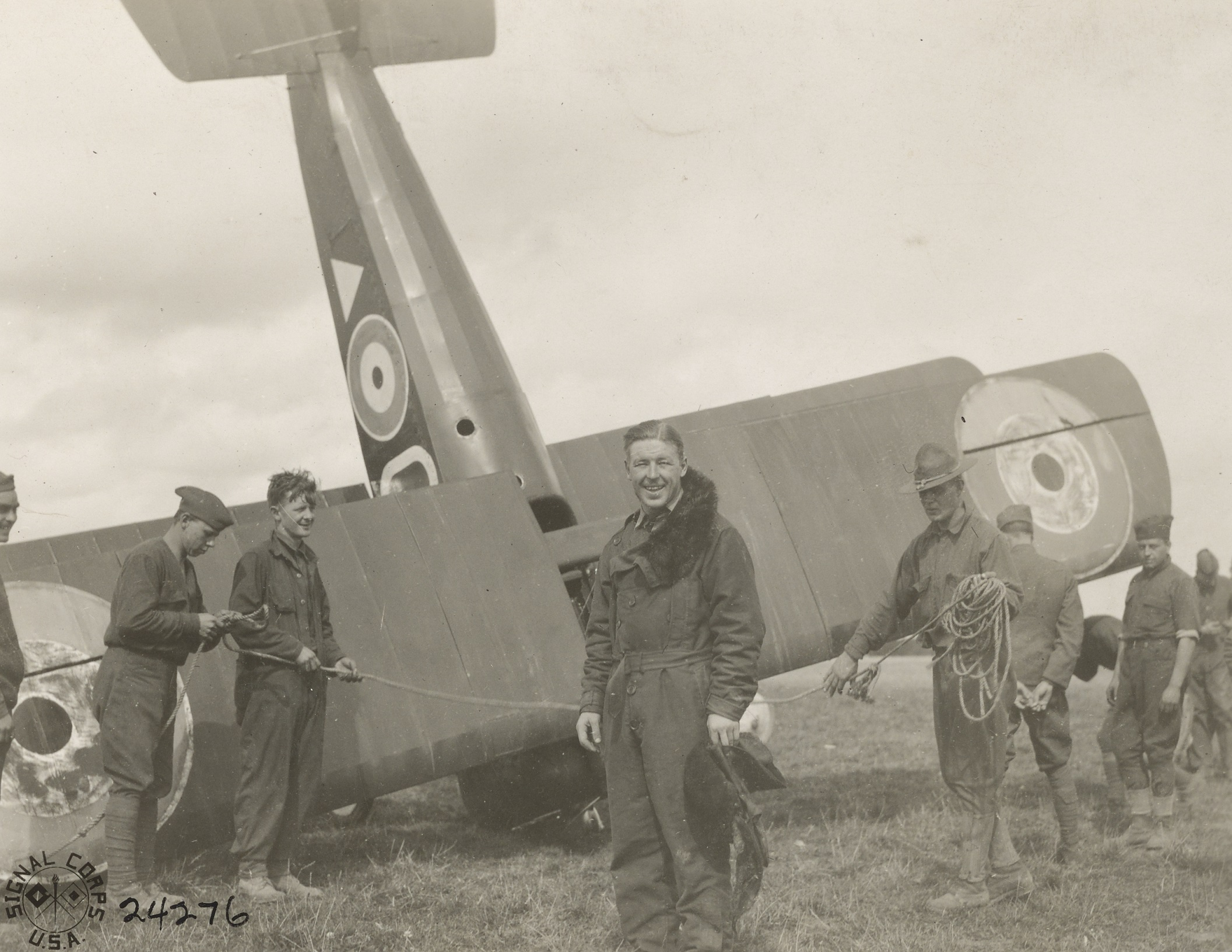
Elliot W. Springs of the 148th Aero Squadron after wrecking his Sopwith Camel in September 1918

Captain Clayton L. Bissell*

Ace with 6 Victories (a.k.a. "kills")
Awarded Distinguished Service Cross (DSC)

1st Lieutenant Field E. Kindley*

Ace with 12 Victories
Awarded Distinguished Service Cross with Bronze Oak Leaf (DSC)
Awarded Distinguished Flying Cross (DFC), Royal Air Force

1st Lieutenant Elliot W. Springs

Ace with 12 Victories
Awarded Distinguished Service Cross (DSC)

1st Lieutenant Henry R. Clay Jr.

Ace with 8 Victories
Awarded with the Distinguished Flying Cross, Royal Air Force
*Awarded with the Distinguished Service Cross with leaf by the American Expeditionary Forces.

1st Lieutenant George V. Seibold – KIA

Awarded Distinguished Service Cross (DSC)
3 Victories

1st Lieutenant Lawrence T. Wyly – Flight Leader – WIA

Awarded Distinguished Service Cross (DSC)
4 Victories

== See also ==
- Organization of the Air Service of the American Expeditionary Force
- List of American aero squadrons
