= Harold Fowler (RAF officer) =

British soldier, aviator, and banker

Harold Fowler CMG DSO MC
- Born: 6 June 1886; Liverpool, England, UK
- Died: 17 January 1957 (aged 70); Palm Beach, Florida, US
- Spouse: Thyrza Benson Flagg Fowler
- Military career
- Allegiance: Great Britain & United States
- Service years: 1915–1918 & 1941–1945

Group Captain Harold Fowler CMG DSO MC (6 June 1886 – 17 January 1957) was a British soldier, aviator, banker, big game hunter and steeplechase jockey. He served during the first part of the First World War with the British army but later transferred to the United States Army upon its entry into the war in 1917. He also served in the RAF during the Second World War. He was decorated by seven countries including the British, American, French and Belgium governments.

Fowler also rode twice as an amateur jockey in the Grand National (1927 and 1928) horse race (being unseated both times) and also flew an aircraft through the Arc de Triomphe in Paris (as part of a drunken bet) in 1918.

== Biography ==
Fowler was born in Liverpool, England in 1887. His family moved to the United States whilst he was schoolboy. He attended Columbia University (graduating in 1908) and started work in the New York Stock Exchange. Just prior to the First World War, Fowler was secretary to Walter Hines Page, the US Ambassador to Great Britain.

== First World War ==
In February 1915, Fowler joined the Royal Field Artillery as a second lieutenant and was sent to the Western Front. He was promoted to lieutenant on New Year's Day 1916 and then joined the Royal Flying Corps, as an observer. He was promoted to Flying Officer (Observer) in April 1916 and then qualified as a pilot in late July 1916.

In January 1917, he joined No. 2 Squadron RAF flying from French airfields and was promoted to captain in February 1917. Fowler then became the flight commander at No. 12 Squadron RAF and is credited with downing a German aircraft in late February 1917. He flew with his navigator on numerous sorties and was awarded the Military Cross in July 1917. The citation for the medal reads as follows:

For conspicuous gallantry and devotion to duty. He has done invaluable service in co-operating with the artillery. On one occasion he descended to 300 feet, and turned our guns on to parties of hostile troops. During the advance he was able to furnish much valuable information.

When the US entered the war on 6 April 1917, Fowler resigned his commission to join the fledgling United States Air Service. He flew with the Americans and was later wounded and also awarded the Distinguished Service Medal. His experience of serving with both the British and American air services led to a liaison position. For his duties in this regard the British awarded him with the Distinguished Service Order (DSO) and Companion of the Order of St Michael and St George (CMG).

At the time of the signing of Armistice in November 1918, Fowler was the Commanding Colonel of the US Third Army Air Service. It was after the Armistice that he flew his biplane through the Arc de Triomphe in Paris. Fowler then returned to his business job in New York City.

== Grand National ==
In 1927, Fowler rode as an amateur in the famous Grand National steeplechase on his own horse, Pop Ahead. He was unseated during the race. The next year he entered again, on a horse called Scotch Eagle and fell at the Canal Turn. Fowler also hunted big game in Africa and North America.

== New York ==
A close friend of Fiorello La Guardia, the Mayor of New York City, Fowler was instrumental in the "Fusion" group of independents which aided La Guardia's election success in 1933 and 1937. Between 1934 and 1937, Fowler was New York City's First Deputy Police Commissioner, responsible for traffic.

== Second World War ==
Fowler returned to the United Kingdom in 1941 as a member of the Royal Canadian Air Force with the honorary rank of group captain. In late 1941 he transferred to the United States Army Air Forces as a colonel as part of Major General James E. Chaney's staff in London. In 1942, he was made attaché at the US Embassy in London.

Fowler also served as an intelligence officer with the RAF. He was badly injured when the plane he was in crashed in North Africa.

== Later life ==
Fowler once again returned to New York after the war ended in 1945. He was married in 1927 to Thyrza Benson Flagg Fowler, and the pair lived between their houses in Southampton, Long Island, and Palm Beach, Florida where he died on 17 January 1957, aged 71. His is interred at Southampton Cemetery, Suffolk County in New York state.

== Awards ==
Fowler was decorated by several countries:

- Distinguished Service Medal (US)
- Purple Heart (US)
- Most Distinguished Order of St Michael and St George (UK)
- Distinguished Service Order (UK)
- Military Cross (UK)
- British War Medal (UK)
- 1914-15 Star (UK)
- Victory Medal (UK)
- Order of the Crown (Knight) (Belgium)
- Médaille militaire (Military Medal) (France)
- Croix de Guerre (1914–1918 France)
- War Cross (1914–1918 France)
- Bronze Medal of Military Valor (Italy)
- Military Virtue Medal (Romania)
- Order of Saint Anna (Russia).
