= 141st Air Refueling Squadron =

New Jersey Air National Guard unit

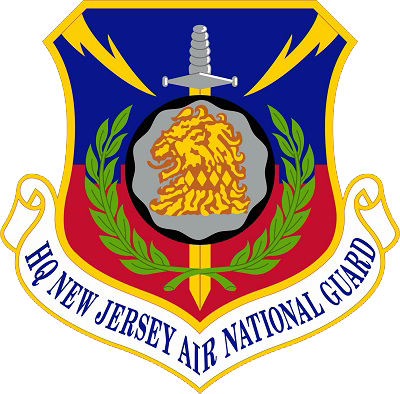
141st Air Refueling Squadron

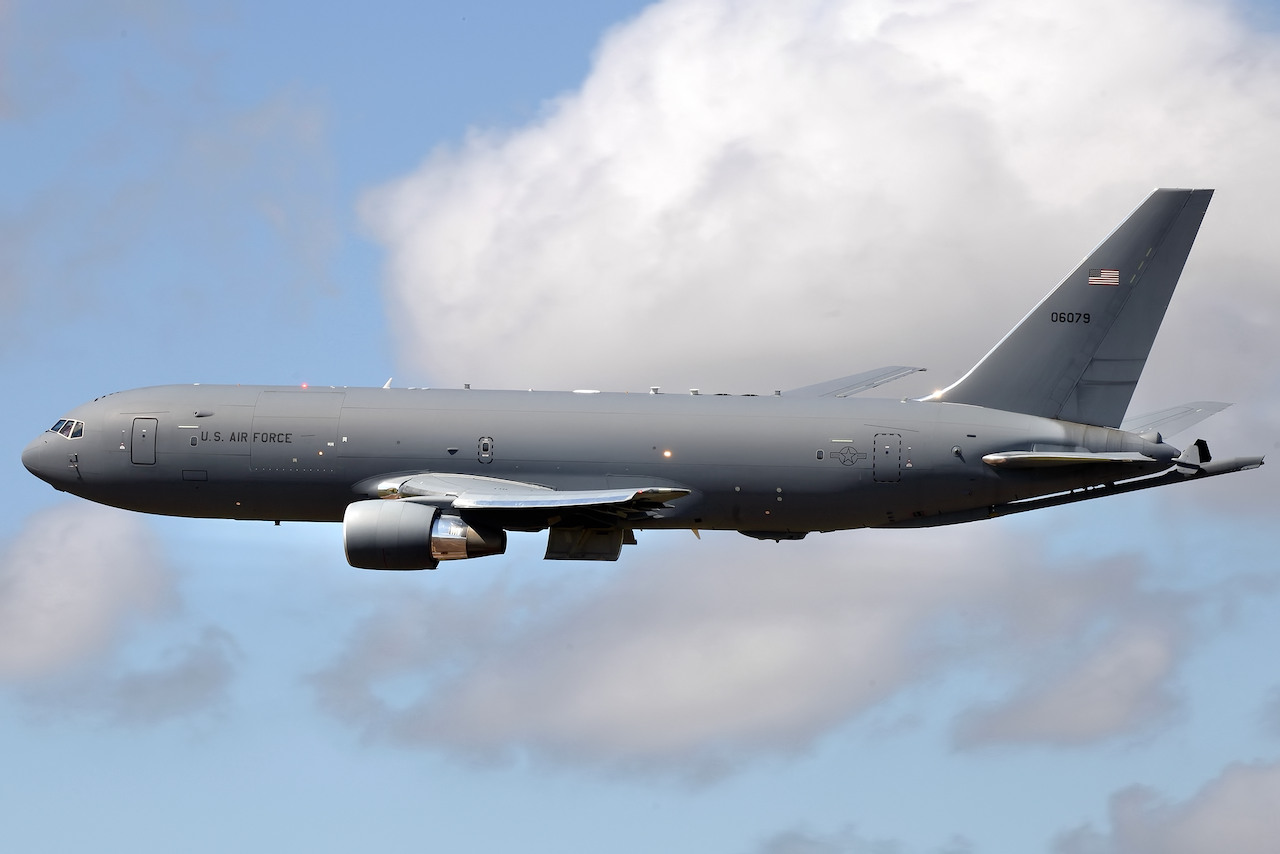
- 141st Air Refueling Squadron Boeing KC-46A Pegasus
- Active: 1918–1919; 1942–1946; 1949–1952; 1952–present
- Country: United States
- Branch: Air National Guard
- Type: Squadron
- Role: Aerial refueling
- Part of: New Jersey Air National Guard
- Garrison/HQ: Joint Base McGuire-Dix-Lakehurst, New Jersey.
- Engagements: World War I Southwest Pacific Theater
- Decorations: Distinguished Unit Citation; Philippine Presidential Unit Citation

Insignia
- 141st Air Refueling Squadron emblem (Note: Description: A Great Bengal tiger with orange and black markings playing with a German helmet and Iron Cross. The Tiger is intended to be a Princeton Tiger in honor of Captain Hobey Baker, the squadron commander, of Princeton University fame. Designed by Lt. Slaughter; approved in November 1918; transferred to the 141st Tactical Fighter Squadron on 30 October 1973; approved on 6 January 1988.)

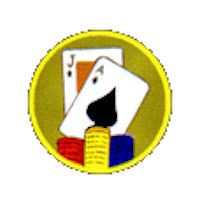
- 341st Fighter Squadron emblem

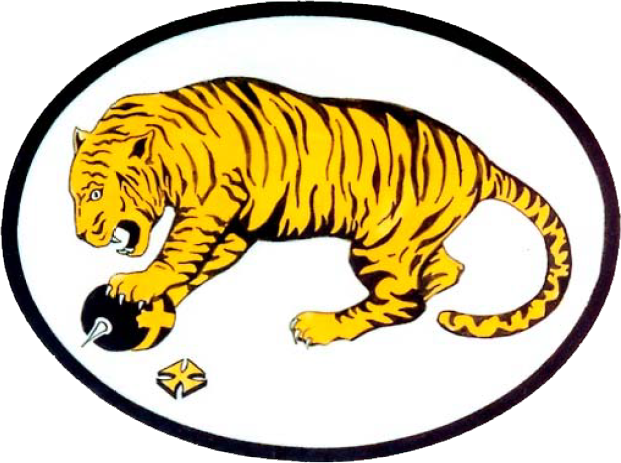
- 141st Aero Squadron emblem (Note: Approved by the American Expeditionary Force 18 November 1918.)
- Tail code (Note: Used while operationally gained by TAC.): NJ
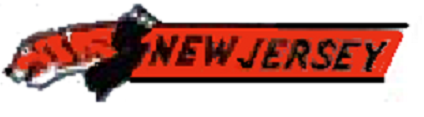
- Tail stripe (Note: Used while operationally gained by AMC.)

The 141st Air Refueling Squadron is a unit of the New Jersey Air National Guard 108th Wing located at McGuire Air Force Base, New Jersey. The 141st is currently an "embedded classic associate" with the 305th Air Mobility Wing, flying the Boeing KC-46A Pegasus since 2023.

The 141st was first organized as the 141st Aero Squadron on 2 January 1918 at Rockwell Field, California. The squadron deployed to France and fought on the Western Front during World War I as a pursuit squadron as part of the American Expeditionary Forces. The unit was demobilized after the war in 1919.

During the Cold War, the 141st was a fighter squadron, operating aircraft including the North American F-86E Sabre, Republic F-105B Thunderchief and McDonnell Douglas F-4E Phantom II.

== History ==
=== 141st Aero Squadron ===
141st Aero Squadron
- Commanders: Capt. Hobard (Hobie) A. E. Baker
- Operations: Western Front, France: 18 October-11 November 1918
- Victories: First combat on 28 October 1918, 2 Enemy Aircraft shot down. 1 by Capt. Baker on 28 October; 1 on 5 November, shared by Capt Baker and Lts. Shelby, Cady, Hamlin and Chappell.

The 141st Aero Squadron (Pursuit) was a United States Army Air Service pursuit squadron, and part of the American Expeditionary Force. It was assigned to the 4th Pursuit Group, Second United States Army, AEF near the end of World War I.

The squadron saw limited combat, and with Second Army's planned offensive drive on Metz cancelled due to the 1918 Armistice with Germany, the squadron was assigned to the United States Third Army as part of the Occupation of the Rhineland in Germany. It returned to the United States in July 1919.

==== Organization ====
The squadron was organized at Rockwell Field, San Diego, California, on 8 October 1917. It was organized as an un-designated provisional unit with men drawn from the 14th and 18th Training Squadrons already at the field. The squadron trained with Curtiss JN-4 Jennies at Rockwell Field. It was not until the latter part of December that the mechanics and support enlisted personnel were assigned to the squadron, and was given its formal designation as the 141st on 2 January 1918, when it was ordered to proceed to Garden City, New York, for overseas deployment.

The 141st reached Field No. 2, near Garden City on 9 January, where final preparations for the squadron were made for overseas shipment. On 15 January it moved to Pier No. 45, Hoboken, New Jersey, where it boarded the Cunard liner RMS Carpathia, arriving at Halifax, Nova Scotia, awaiting to form up into a convoy. on the 19th, it began the overseas journey with seven other ships along with the cruiser USS San Diego, arriving at Glasgow, Scotland on 30 January. On the 31st, after a train trip to Winchester, England, the squadron was assigned to the Morn Hill Rest Camp for classification and advanced training in England.

==== Training in England ====
For the next several months, the squadron went through advanced training to prepare it for combat at the front in France. "A" Flight was assigned to Dover, Kent; "B" Flight at the Hounslow Heath Aerodrome, near London, and "C" Flight to Northolt Airdrome, also near London. On 9 March 1918, the squadron reformed at Northolt, where it proceeded to the Swingate Down Airdrome, near Dover, Kent where it received final training by the Royal Flying Corps.

The squadron arrived in France on 16 August 1918 and moved to the St. Maixent Aerodrome for equipping. Orders to move were received on 27 August for the Air Service Production Center No. 2 at Romorantin Aerodrome, where it waited for another nineteen days. Finally on 16 September it moved again to the 1st Air Depot at Colombey-les-Belles Airdrome where the 141st received SPAD S.XIII pursuit aircraft. There it was assigned to the 4th Pursuit Group, and moved to Croix de Metz Aerodrome (Toul) for combat duty, arriving on 19 October.

==== Meuse-Argonne Offensive ====
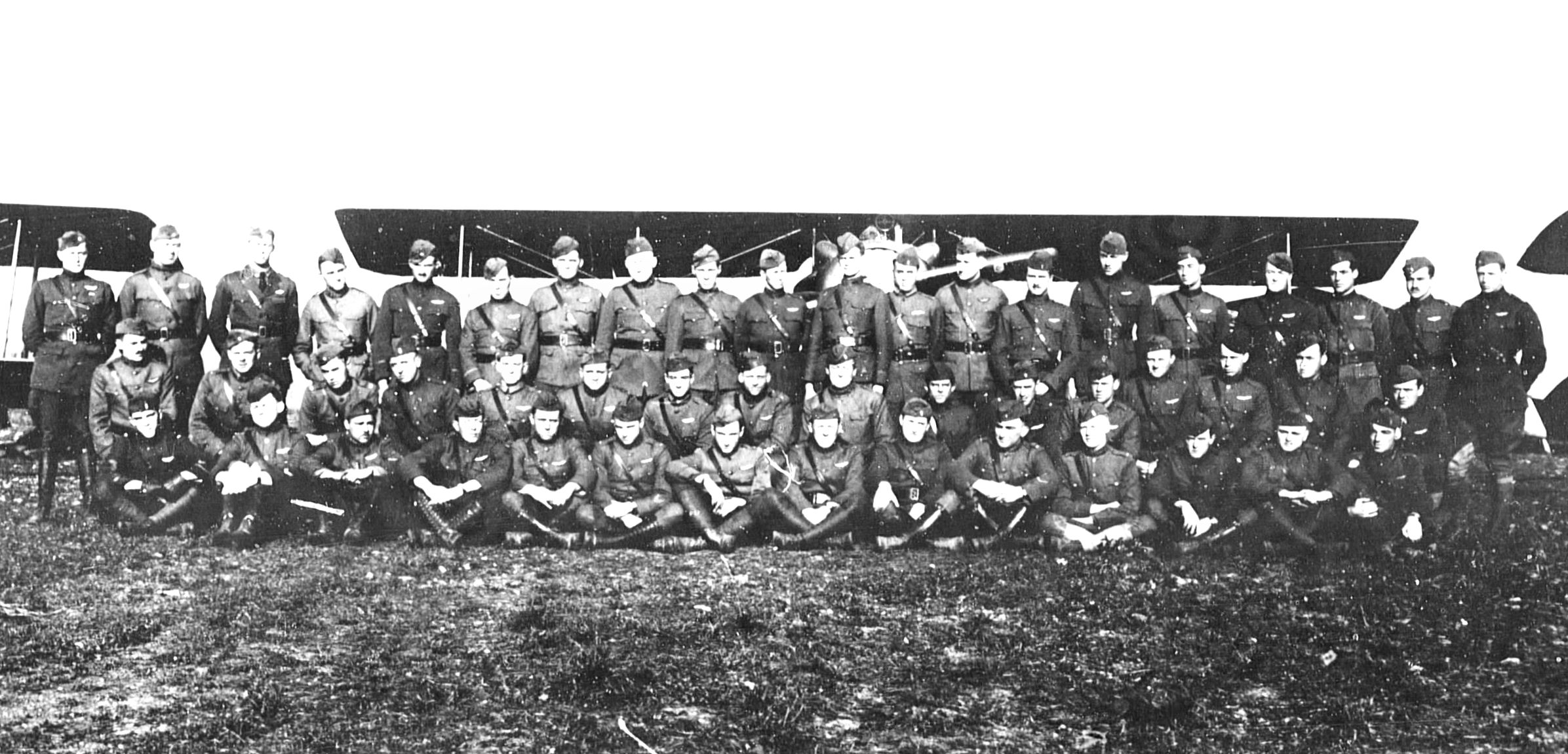
141st Aero Squadron, November 1918 Gengault Aerodrome (Toul), France.

The 141st flew its first patrol on 23 October and every day thereafter. Its combat commander, Hobey Baker, was a famous hockey and football star at Princeton University before the war. It was said, Hobey preferred Ivy League men in his unit, preferably from Princeton. Indeed, he painted the aircraft in his squadron in Princeton colors: Orange and Black.

The 141st shot down its first enemy aircraft on 28 October, by Captain Baker. A second enemy aircraft was shot down on 6 November by a patrol consisting of Captain Baker and Lieutenants Shelby, Cady, Hamiln and Chappell. The 141st was involved in 13 combats, the only pursuit squadron of the Air Service, Second Army to do so.

After the November 1918 Armistice with Germany, the squadron remained at Gengault Aerodrome. Tragically, its commander, Captain Hobey Baker was killed on 21 December 1918 when he took a SPAD XIII up for one last ride. The SPAD developed engine trouble while taking off and Baker died when the aircraft crashed soon thereafter.

==== Third Army of Occupation ====
On 19 April 1919, the squadron was assigned to the Third Army Air Service, 5th Pursuit Group. It was moved to Coblenz Airdrome, Germany, to serve as part of the occupation force of the Rhineland. For the next several months the squadron was able to perform test flights on surrendered German aircraft. Flights of the Fokker D.VII, Pfalz D.XII, Halberstadt and Rumpler aircraft were made and evaluations were made.

==== Demobilization ====
On 18 June 1919, orders were received from Third Army for the squadron to report to the 1st Air Depot, Colombey-les-Belles Airdrome to turn in all of its supplies and equipment and was relieved from duty with the AEF. The squadron's SPAD aircraft were delivered to the Air Service American Air Service Acceptance Park No. 1 at Orly Aerodrome to be returned to the French. There practically all of the pilots and observers were detached from the squadron.

Personnel at Colombey were subsequently assigned to the Commanding General, Services of Supply and ordered to report to one of several staging camps in France. There, personnel awaited scheduling to report to one of the Base Ports in France for transport to the United States. Upon return to the US, most squadron personnel were demobilized at Camp Mills, New York on 18 July 1919.

On 8 September 1973, the 141st Aero Squadron was reconstituted and allotted to the National Guard. It was consolidated with the 141st Tactical Fighter Squadron. (Note: Department of the Air Force DAF/PRM Letter 719p, 27 August 1973 Subject: Organization Actions Affecting Certain Air National Guard Units, reconstituted the 141st Aero Squadron, but withdrew the existing 141st Tactical Fighter Squadron from the National Guard, redesignated it the 341st Fighter Squadron and disbanded it. Department of the Air Force DAF/PRM Letter 719p-1, 6 January 1988, Subject: Organization Actions Affecting Certain Air National Guard Units revoked the August 1973 action.)

=== World War II ===
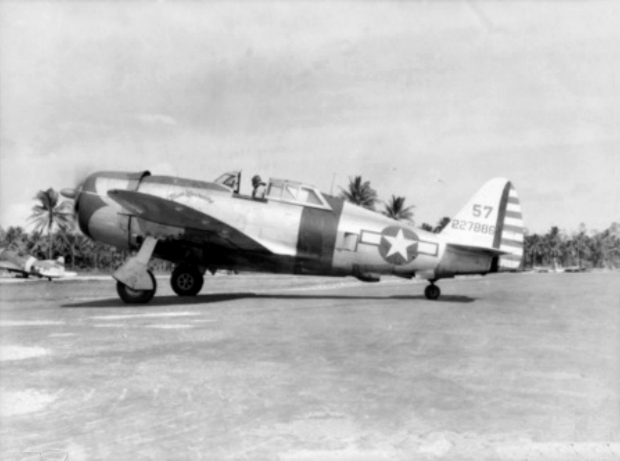
341st Fighter Squadron P-47D Thunderbolt at Tanauan Airfield, Leyte, Philippines in January 1945 (Note: Aircraft is Republic P-47D-23-RA Thunderbolt Miss Lorraine, serial 42-27886.)

The 341st Fighter Squadron was activated at Mitchel Field, New York, on 30 September 1942 as one of the original squadrons of the 348th Fighter Group. It was one of the first Army Air Forces units equipped with the Republic P-47 Thunderbolt. After an extended period of training in the northeast United States, the squadron deployed to Archer Field (Archerfield Airport), Brisbane, Australia in June 1943. it began long-range missions to strike at Japanese targets in New Guinea. In mid-June the 341st made the 1,200-mile flight from Brisbane to Port Moresby, New Guinea. The unit operated from New Guinea and Noemfoor until November 1944, flying patrol and reconnaissance missions and escorted bombers to targets in New Guinea and New Britain.

In 1944 the 341st began to attack airfields, installations, and shipping in western New Guinea, Ceram, and Halmahera to aid in neutralizing those areas preparatory to the US invasion of the Philippines. When U.S. troops landed on Luzon the squadron in process of conversion from P-47's to North American P-51 Mustangs, began operation from San Marcelino airstrip a few days after the landing at San Marcelino and Subic Bay. From this location the unit engaged in ground support operations, bombing and strafing in close support of ground troops. Remained in the Philippines throughout the campaign, moving to Okinawa in mid July 1945 in preparation for the planned invasion of Japan. Engaged in long-range operations over the Japanese Home Islands until ceasing combat on 14 August 1945.

It became part of the Army of Occupation in Japan, moving to Itami Airfield, Japan in October 1945 as part of Far East Air Forces. It was inactivated at Itami on 10 May 1946.

=== New Jersey Air National Guard ===
==== Cold War ====
The wartime 341st Fighter Squadron was redesignated the 141st Fighter Squadron, and was allotted to the National Guard on 24 May 1946. It was organized at Mercer Airport, Trenton, New Jersey and was extended federal recognition on 26 May 1949. The squadron was equipped with P-47D (later F-47D) Thunderbolts and was assigned to the 108th Fighter Group.

The unit was called to active federal service on 1 March 1951. The squadron was sent to Turner Air Force Base, Georgia where it continued its mission to provide fighter escorts to SAC bombers on training missions. In December 1951 it moved to Godman Air Force Base, Kentucky where it replaced a unit deployed to England. It was released from active duty and returned to New Jersey state control on 10 November 1952.

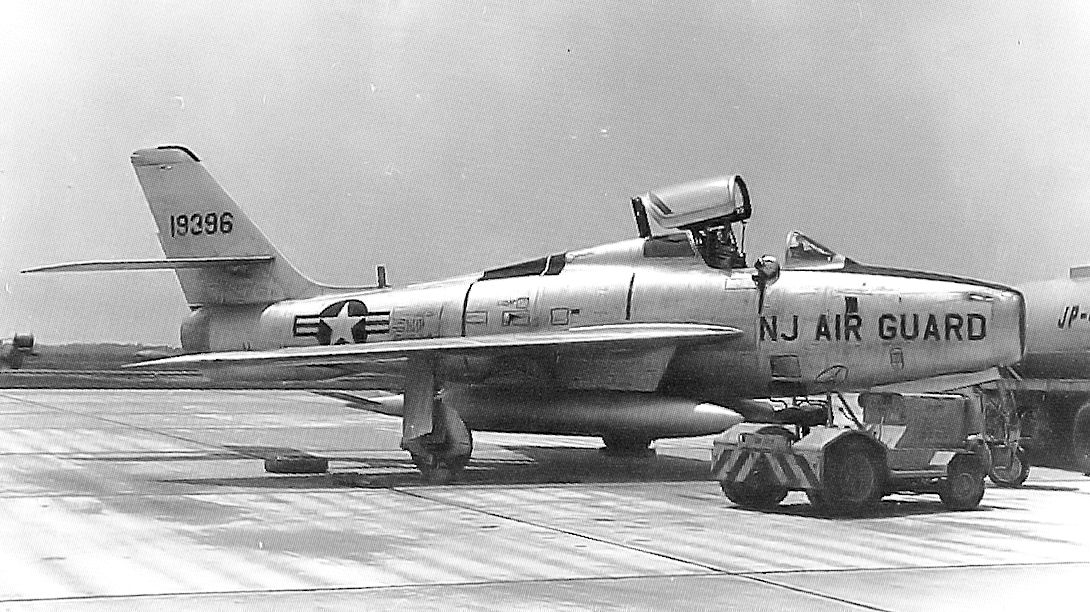
141st TFS F-84F Thunderstreak about 1960 (Note: Aircraft is General Motors built Republic F-84F-25-GK Thunderstreak, serial 51-9396. This plane is on display at Holloman Air Force Base in the markings of another F-84. Baugher, Joe (8 September 2023). "1951 USAF Serial Numbers". Joe Baugher. Archived from the original on 23 July 2011.)

With its return to state control, the parent 108th Wing was and was redesignated as a Fighter-Interceptor Wing. The 141st Fighter-Interceptor Squadron was re-equipped with the long-range North American F-51H Mustang fighter. Designed for the invasion of Japan, the P-51H was the last variant of the P-51 Mustang of World War II, but was produced too late to see any wartime combat. Not used in the Korean War due to it not being believed as "rugged" as its famous "D" model predecessor, the P-51H was used instead to equip Air National Guard units into the 1950s as an interceptor. In 1955, the Mustangs were retired and the squadron entered the jet age, with the arrival of the North American F-86E Sabre.

The squadron was redesignated the 141st Tactical Fighter Squadron in 1958. It transferred its interceptors and received and Republic F-84F Thunderstreak fighter-bombers.

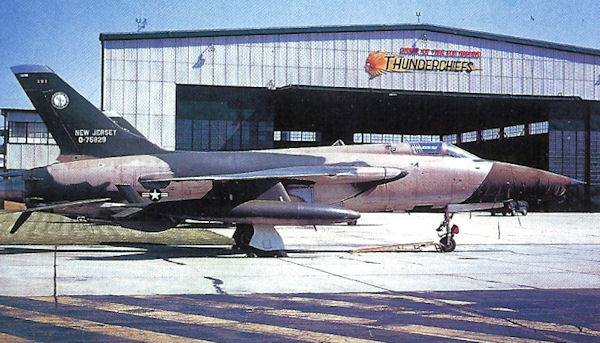
108th Wing F-105B Thunderstreak (Note: Aircraft is Republic F-105B-20-RE, serial 57-5829. The sign on the hangar proudly proclaiming McGuire AFB as the "Home of the Air Guard Thunderchiefs". This plane was sent to Tinker Air Force Base, where it was used to practice airfield battle damage repair. Baugher, Joe (29 April 2023). "1957 USAF Serial Numbers". Joe Baugher.)

At the height of the Cold War in 1961, the squadron was again federalized as a result of tensions concerning the Berlin Wall. 28 F-84F's of the 141st and officers and airmen from all three squadrons of the 108th Wing were deployed to Chaumont-Semoutiers Air Base, France on 16 October with the last aircraft and personnel arriving on 6 November. The ground units deployed by sealift, with the deployed elements reaching Chaumont by 17 November. In France, the deployed elements were assigned to the Provisional United States Air Forces Europe 7108th Tactical Wing on 20 November due to the reduced strength of the 108th Wing in Europe. The primary mission of the 7108th was to provide close air support to the Seventh Army in Europe under the direction of ground forward air controllers. To accomplish this mission, up to 30 sorties were flown each day. The deployment to France ended in October 1962 and the unit returned to New Jersey state control, leaving the F-84Fs in France.

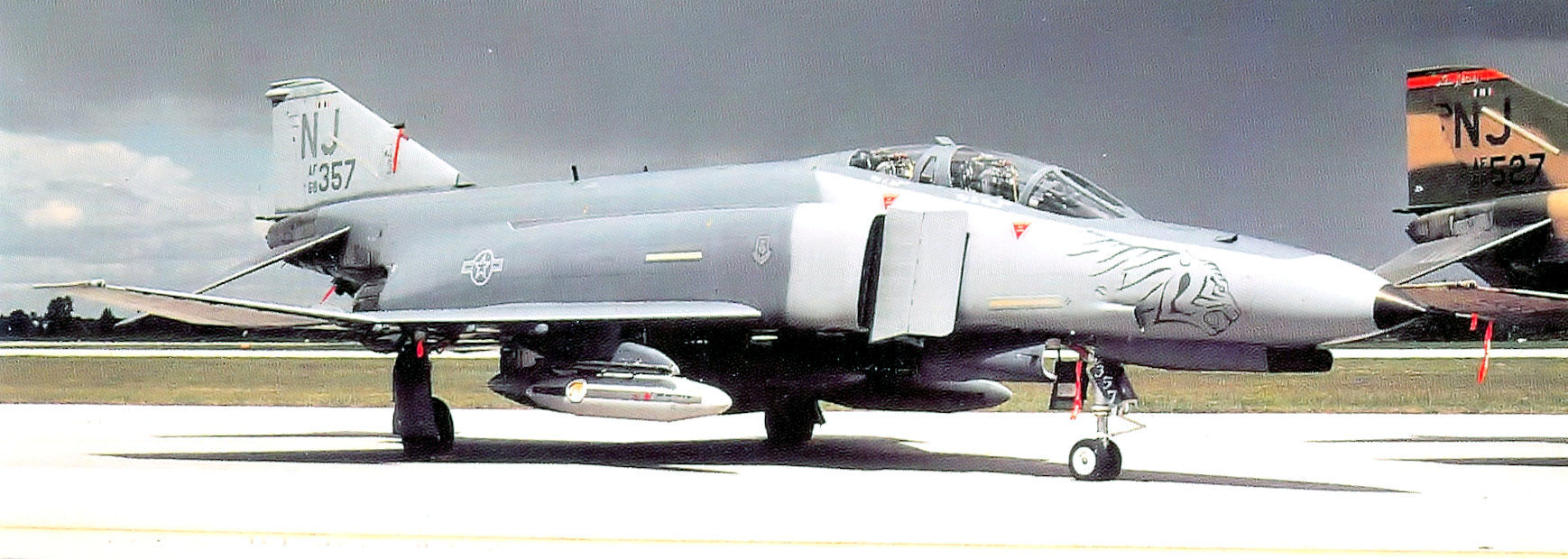
141st TFS F-4E Phantom II, about 1990 (Note: Aircraft is McDonnell F-4E-37-MC Phantom II, serial 68-0357. Note tail code "NJ" and Tiger illustration on nose. This plane was sent to the Aerospace Maintenance and Regeneration Center on 2 October 1991 and scrapped on 6 August 2018. Baugher, Joe (8 September 2023). "1968 USAF Serial Numbers". Joe Baugher. Archived from the original on 12 December 2021.)

Upon return from France, the squadron was moved from Trenton to McGuire Air Force Base due to air congestion in the Philadelphia area. At McGuire, the squadron was re-equipped with North American F-86H Sabres. Beginning in 1965, the Sabres were retired and the squadron began to receive the Republic F-105B Thunderchief. The 108th was the first Air National Guard unit to fly twice the speed of sound. In May 1981, the McDonnell Douglas F-4D Phantom II replaced the F-105s, and in 1985, they were upgraded to the F-4E Phantom II.

==== Tankers ====
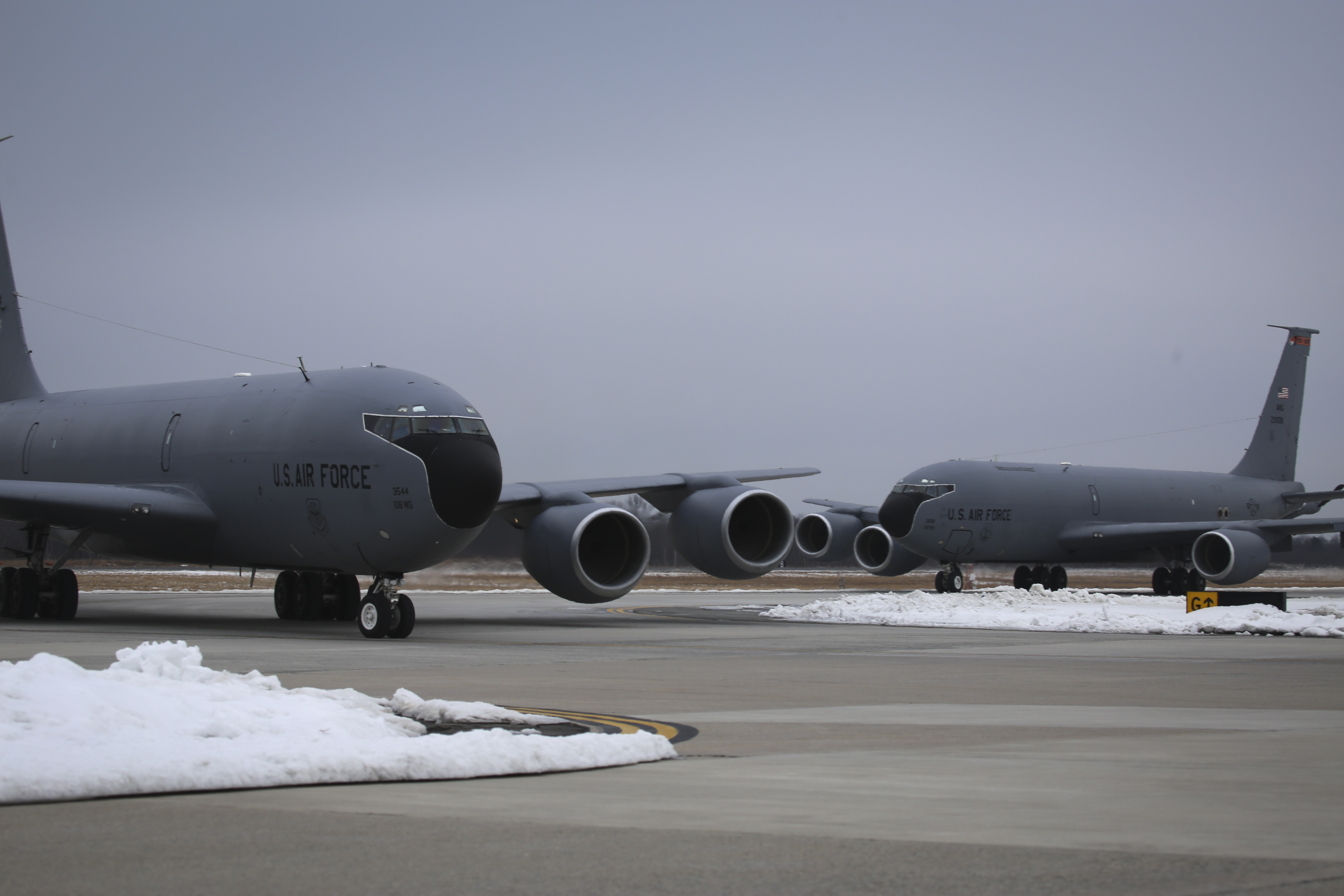
141st ARS KC-135R Statotankers at Joint Base McGuire-Dix-Lakehurst, 2015

With the end of the Cold War, the parent 141st was realigned as a Boeing KC-135E Stratotanker unit. The F-4Es were retired and the squadron was redesignated the 141st Air Refueling Squadron. Also, as part of the conversion of the wing to the Objective Wing organization, the 108th Tactical Fighter Group became the 108th Operations Group, to which the 141st was assigned. The 141st received its first KC-135E on 27 September 1991, flying its first refueling mission on 6 December. The squadron flew their first operational KC-135E mission on 16 January 1992, conducting a nighttime refueling of a Boeing E-3B Sentry that was en route to the Persian Gulf. The 141st was certified combat ready on 3 December 1992. The very next day it was tasked with its first operational deployment – nothing less than spearheading and establishing the U.S. – Somalia air bridge for the Unified Task Force deployment there. It deployed an air refueling detachment to Moron Air Base, Spain.

In September 1994, for over 30 days, five aircraft deployed to Pisa Airport, Italy for Operation Deny Flight. The wing replaced the 126th Air Refueling Wing of the Illinois Air National Guard. The 108th was the first Air National Guard unit to take full responsibility during that period.

In 2007, the 141st began retiring its KC-135E aircraft and transitioning to the KC-135R, completing the conversion by 2008.

In 2017, the squadron commemorated its centenary by applying a special tiger scheme to KC-135R, serial 62-3508. On 20 September 2023, the squadron flew its last mission with the KC-135R, as it transitioned to becoming an associate squadron of the 305th Air Mobility Wing, flying Boeing KC-46A Pegasus tankers.

The 141st flew its first KC-46A sortie on 3 October 2023, launching two aircraft (callsigns Hobey 41 and 42), which refueled General Dynamics F-16 Fighting Falcons before taking turns refueling each other.

== Lineage ==
141st Air Refueling Squadron

- Organized on 8 October 1917 as the 141st Aero Squadron

Redesignated 141st Aero Squadron (Pursuit) on 2 January 1918
Demobilized on 19 July 1919
Reconstituted, allotted to the National Guard, and consolidated with the 141st Tactical Fighter Squadron on 8 September 1973
Redesignated 141st Air Refueling Squadron on 19 October 1991

141st Tactical Fighter Squadron

- Constituted as the 341st Fighter Squadron (Single Engine) on 24 September 1942

Activated on 30 September 1942
Inactivated on 10 May 1946
Redesignated 141st Fighter Squadron, Single Engine and allotted to the National Guard on 24 May 1946
Activated and extended federal recognition on 26 May 1949
Federalized and placed on active duty on 1 March 1951
Redesignated 141st Fighter-Bomber Squadron on 16 May 1951
Inactivated and released from active duty on 1 December 1952
Returned to New Jersey state control and activated on 1 December 1952
Redesignated 141st Fighter-Interceptor Squadron c. 1 July 1955
Redesignated 141st Tactical Fighter Squadron (Special Delivery) on 1 July 1958
Federalized and placed on active duty on 1 October 1961
Released from active duty, returned to New Jersey state control and redesignated 141st Tactical Fighter Squadron on 30 August 1962
Consolidated with the 141st Aero Squadron on 8 September 1973

=== Assignments ===
- Post Headquarters, Rockwell Field, 8 October 1917
- Aviation Concentration Center, 9 January 1918
- Air Service Headquarters, AEF, British Isles, 30 January 1918 (attached to the Royal Flying Corps for training after 31 January 1918)
- Replacement Concentration Center, AEF, 16 August 1918
- Air Service Production Center No. 2, AEF, 27 August – 16 September 1918
- 4th Pursuit Group, 23 October 1918
- 5th Pursuit Group, 19 April 1919
- 1st Air Depot, 18 June 1919
- Commanding General, Services of Supply, July 1919
- Eastern Department, July 1919
- 348th Fighter Group, 30 September 1942 – 10 May 1946
- 108th Fighter Group (later 108th Fighter-Bomber Group), 26 May 1949 – 1 December 1952
- 108th Fighter-Bomber Group (later 108th Fighter-Interceptor Group, 108th Tactical Fighter Group), 1 December 1952
- 7108th Tactical Fighter Wing, 1 October 1961
- 108th Tactical Fighter Group, 30 August 1962
- 108th Tactical Fighter Wing, 8 September 1973
- 108th Operations Group, 19 October 1991 – present

=== Stations ===
- Rockwell Field, California, 8 October 1917
- Aviation Concentration Center, Garden City, New York, 9 January 1918
- Morn Hill Rest Camp, Winchester, England, 31 January 1918

"A" flight, Dover, England, 1 February-9 March 1918
"B" flight, Hounslow Heath Aerodrome, England, 1 February-9 March 1918
"C" flight, Northolt Airdrome, England, 1 February-9 March 1918

- Swingate Down Airdrome, England, 10 March-10 August 1918
- St. Maixent Replacement Barracks, France, 16 August 1918
- Romorantin Aerodrome, France, 27 August 1918
- Colombey-les-Belles Airdrome, France, 16 September 1918
- Croix de Metz Aerodrome, France, 19 October 1918
- Coblenz Airdrome (Fort Kaiser Alexander), Germany, 19 April 1919
- Colombey-les-Belles Airdrome, France, 18 June 1919
- France, July 1919
- Camp Mills, New York, July 1919
- Mitchel Field, New York, 30 September 1942
- Bradley Field, Connecticut, 30 September 1942
- Westover Field, Massachusetts, 30 October 1942
- Hillsgrove Army Air Field, Rhode Island, 23 January 1943
- Westover Field, Massachusetts, 26 April – 9 May 1943
- Jackson Airfield (7 Mile Drome), Port Moresby, New Guinea, 23 June 1943
- Finschafen Airfield (Dreger Field), New Guinea, 13 December 1943
- Saidor Airfield, New Guinea, 13 March 1944
- Wakde Airfield, Netherlands East Indies, 26 May 1944
- Kornasoren (Yebrurro) Airfield Noemfoor, Netherlands East Indies, 24 August 1944
- Tacloban Airfield, Leyte, Philippines, 30 November 1944
- Tanauan Airfield, Leyte, Philippines, 14 December 1944
- San Marcelino Airfield, Luzon, Philippines, 4 February 1945
- Floridablanca Airfield, Luzon, Philippines, c. 15 May 1945
- Ie Shima Airfield, Ryuku Islands, 9 July 1945
- Kanoya Airfield, Japan, 9 September 1945
- Itami Airfield, Japan, c. 20 October 1945 – 10 May 1946
- Mercer Airport, New Jersey, 26 May 1949
- Turner Air Force Base, Georgia, 1 March 1951
- Godman Air Force Base, Kentucky, 11 December 1951 – 1 December 1952
- McGuire Air Force Base, New Jersey, 1 December 1952
- Chaumont-Semoutiers Air Base, France, 1 October 1961
- McGuire Air Force Base, New Jersey, 30 August 1962 – 8 September 1973
- McGuire Air Force Base, New Jersey, 8 September 1973 – present

=== Aircraft ===
- SPAD S.VII, 1918
- SPAD S.XIII, 1918–1919
- Republic P-47D (later F-47D) Thunderbolt, 1942–1945, 1949–1952
- North American P-51D Mustang, 1945–1946
- North American F-51H Mustang, 1952–1955
- North American F-86E Sabre, 1955–1958
- Republic F-84F Thunderstreak, 1958–1962
- North American F-86H Sabre, 1962–1965
- Republic F-105B Thunderchief, 1965–1981
- McDonnell Douglas F-4D Phantom II, 1981–1985
- McDonnell Douglas F-4E Phantom II, 1985–1991
- Boeing KC-135E Stratotanker, 1991–2007
- Boeing KC-135R Stratotanker, 2007–2023
- Boeing KC-46 Pegasus, 2023–present

=== Operations and decorations ===
- Combat Operations: World War I; World War II
- Campaigns: Meuse-Argonne Offensive; Air Offensive, Japan; Bismark-Archipelago; Luzon; Northern Solomons; New Guinea; Ryukyus; Southern Philippines
- Decorations:

Distinguished Unit Citation, New Britain, 16–31 December 1943
Distinguished Unit Citation, Philippines, 24 December 1944 – 9 July 1945

== See also ==
- Organization of the Air Service of the American Expeditionary Force
- List of American aero squadrons
