= Creek (surname) =

Creek is a surname. Notable people with the surname include:

- Amber Creek (1982–1997), American murder victim
- Doug Creek (1969–2024), American baseball player
- Mitch Creek (born 1992), Australian basketball player

== Fictional charachers ==
- The protagonist of Jonathan Creek, BBC TV mystery series
