= Chandler Field =

Chandler Field may refer to:

- Alexandria Municipal Airport, also known as Chandler Field, a public use airport near Alexandria, Douglas County, Minnesota, United States
- Chandler Field (Pennsylvania), a former military airfield near Essington, Delaware County, Pennsylvania, United States
- Fresno Chandler Executive Airport, a public use airport near Fresno, California, United States, also called Chandler Field

== See also ==
- Chandler Fields (born 2000), American college football player
