= Call Field =

World War I airfield in Texas, United States

- Wichita Falls, Texas
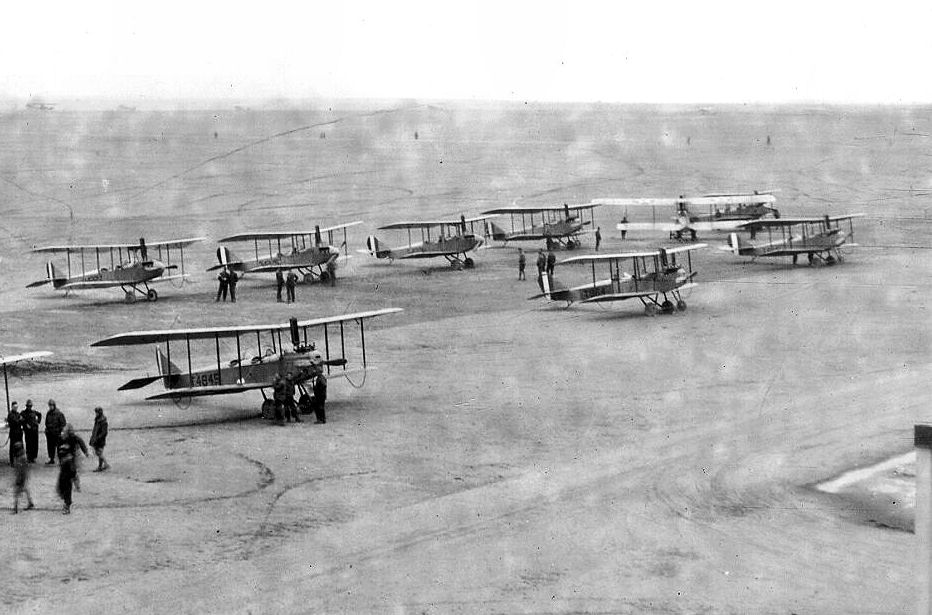
- A Field of Standard J-1's at Call Field, Wichita Falls, Texas, 1918

Site information
- Type: Pilot/Observer training airfield
- Controlled by: Air Service, United States Army
- Condition: Redeveloped into urban area

Location
- Location within Texas
- Coordinates: 33°52′18″N 98°33′18″W

Site history
- Built: 1918
- In use: 1918–1921
- Battles/wars: World War I

Garrison information
- Garrison: Training Section, Air Service

Call Field is a former World War I military airfield, located 4.6 miles (7.4 km) southwest of Wichita Falls, Texas. It operated as a training field for the United States Army Air Service between 1917 until 1919. The airfield was one of thirty-two Air Service training camps established in 1918 after the United States entry into World War I.

== History ==
Call Field was named for 1st Lieutenant Loren H. Call who reported for aeronautical duty at College Park, Maryland on 19 October 1912. In the winter of 1912–1913, he and Lieutenant E. L. Ellington were sent to Palm Beach, Florida, in charge of the Signal Corps Aviation Station. From Palm Beach, Lieutenant Call was ordered to Texas City, Texas, and it was there that he was killed in an airplane accident on 8 July 1913.

=== World War I ===
In April 1917 after the United States' entry into World War I, the Army announced its intention of establishing a series of camps to train prospective pilots. Frank Kell of Wichita Falls organized an effort to attract the army to the city. In June 1917, the Department of War sent a cadre of officers to the Wichita Falls, Texas, area to survey sites for an aviation school. The group decided on a location about 5 miles southwest of Wichita Falls. By 17 August 1917, Kell and others successfully raised $35,000 and had a commitment from the Missouri, Kansas and Texas Railroad to extend tracks to the proposed site of the camp. On 27 August construction began of the training field began.

Call Field had forty-six buildings, which included twelve hangars that housed four to eight planes each, a hospital, and six barracks that held 175 men each. In May 1918 four additional hangars and a row of lofts to hold carrier pigeons were built. It covered over 700 acres and could accommodate up to 1,000 personnel. Dozens of wooden buildings served as headquarters, maintenance, and officers’ quarters. Enlisted men had to bivouac in tents. In May 1918 four additional hangars and a row of lofts to hold carrier pigeons were built.

In November, when 85 percent of the work was completed, Maj. J. B. Brooks arrived to inspect the facilities. On 10 November he was named commander. On 29 November the 163d Aero Squadron, equipped with six Curtiss JN-4 Jenny trainers arrived from Kelly Field, and the field had 600 pilots by late December. Most of the JN-4 Jennys to be used for flight training, however, were shipped in wooden crates by railcar. On 15 January 1918 the army gave final approval of Call Field.

Call Field served as a base for advanced observer training. It offered a five-week course for observers and a four-week course for pilots. Its student capacity was 300. It also operated a Reserve Military Aviator's Concentration School with one squadron.

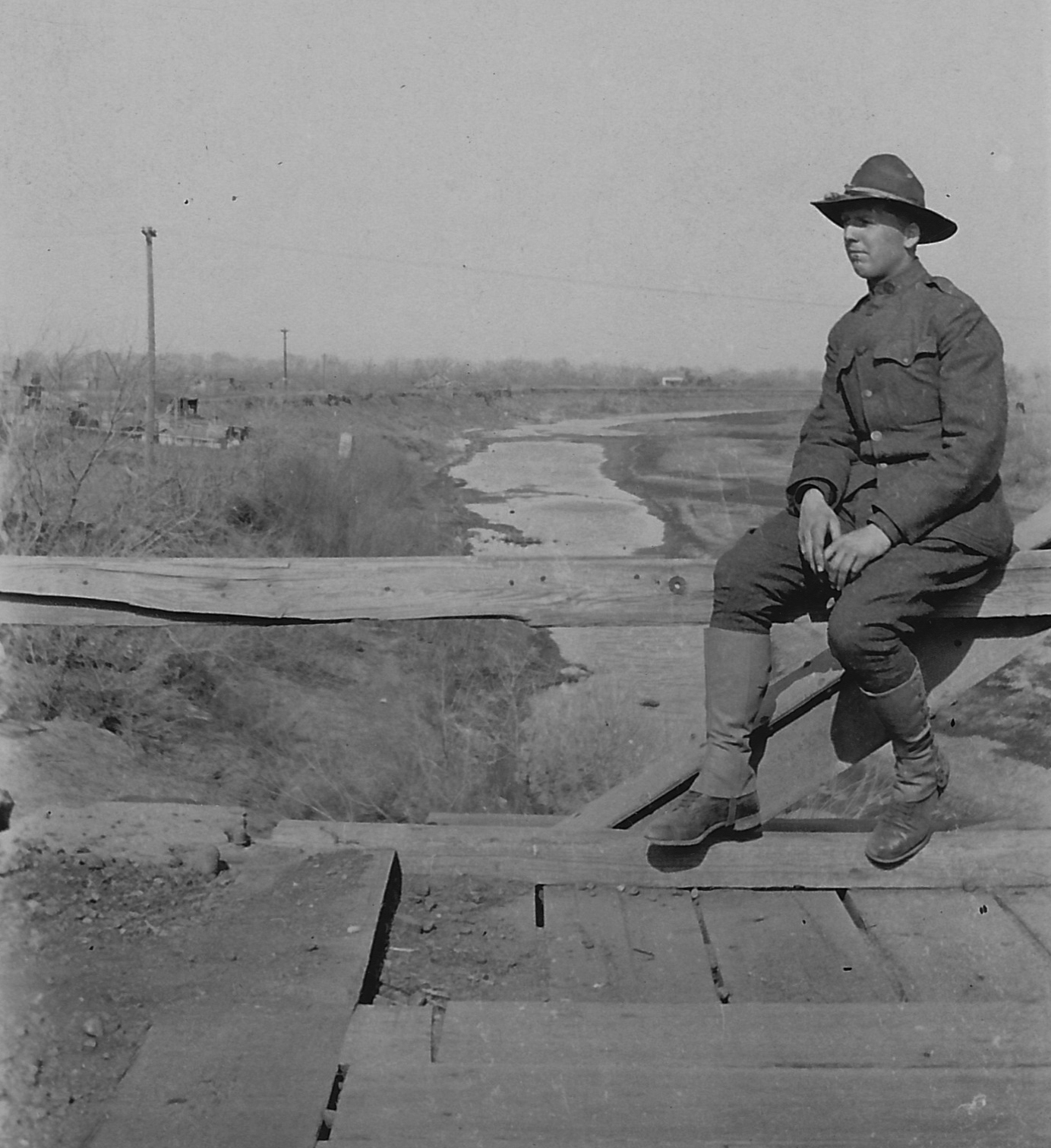
Howard C. Wahlen, Squadron B, of Raymond, WA at Call Field, Wichita Falls, TX 1918.

Training units assigned to Call Field:

- Post Headquarters, Call Field, November 1917 – October 1919
- 164th Aero Squadron, November 1917

Re-designated as Squadron "A", July–November 1918

- 192d Aero Squadron, December 1917

Re-designated as Squadron "B", July–November 1918

- 198th Aero Squadron, December 1917

Re-designated as Squadron "C", July–November 1918

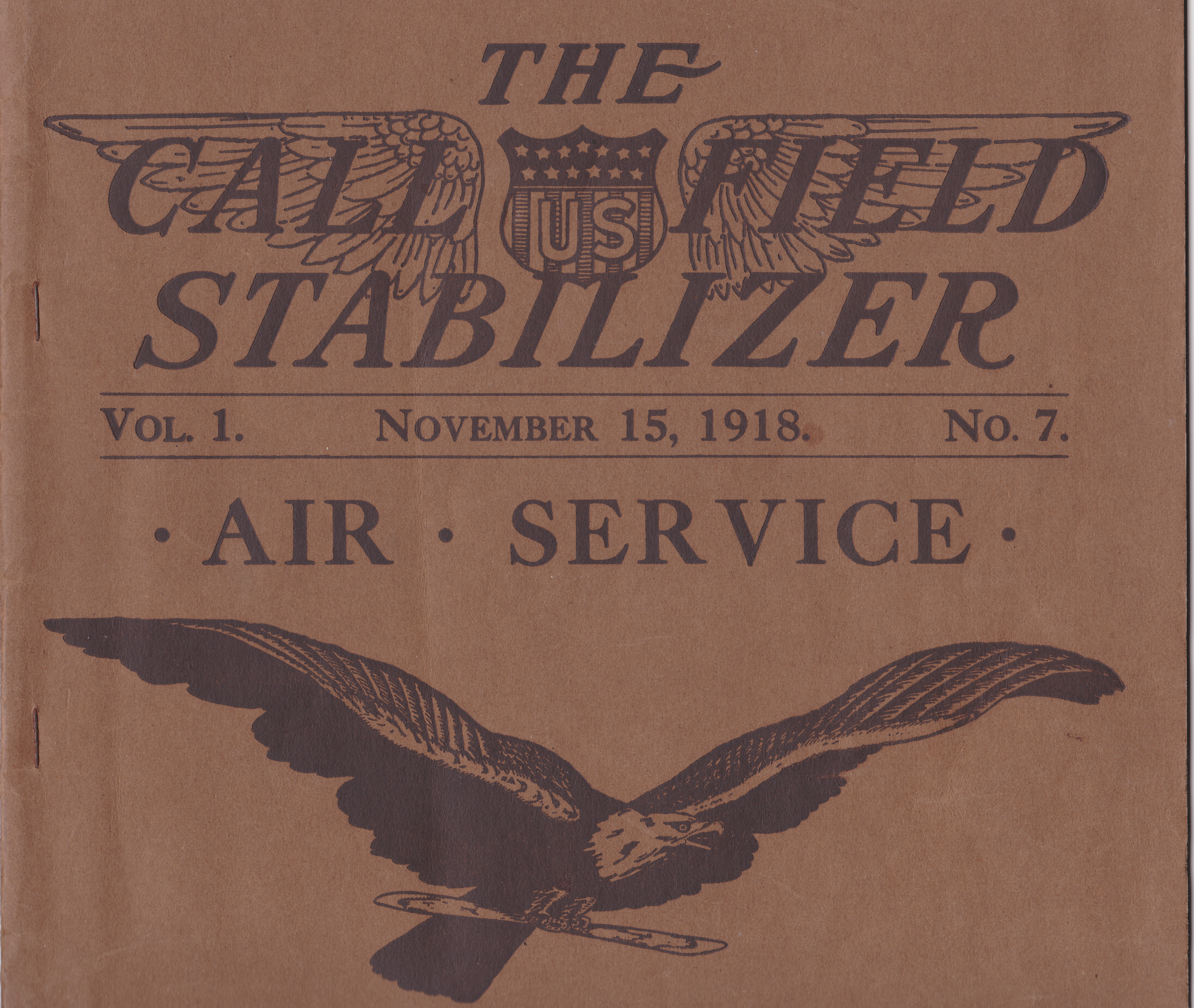
- Top half of the cover of The Call Field Stabilizer Vol.1 No.7, November 15, 1918. Published monthly by the U.S. Aviation School at Call Field, Wichita Falls, TX.
  Squadron "D"

Transferred from Barron Field, Texas, September–November 1918

- Squadron "E"

Transferred from Carruthers Field, Texas, September–November 1918

- Flying School Detachment (Consolidation of Squadrons A-E), November 1918 – November 1919

Service units trained at Call Field:

- 73d Aero Squadron (II), March–July 1918; Deployed to American Expeditionary Forces, France
- 74th Aero Squadron, March–August 1918; Transferred to Hazelhurst Field, New York

During its operation 3,000 officers, cadets, and enlisted men were stationed at Call Field, and 500 officers received their wings there. Two squadrons left the training facility for overseas duty. Thirty-four men lost their lives during training exercises, the smallest number of fatalities of any training center.

=== Closure ===
With the sudden end of World War I in November 1918, the future operational status of Call Field was unknown. Many local officials speculated that the U.S. government would keep the field open because of the outstanding combat record established by Call-trained pilots in Europe. Locals also pointed to the optimal weather conditions in the North Texas area for flight training. Cadets in flight training on 11 November 1918 were allowed to complete their training, however no new cadets were assigned to the base. Also the separate training squadrons were consolidated into a single Flying School detachment, as many of the personnel assigned were being demobilized. Finally, flight training activities ceased on November 8, 1919.

In December 1919 Call Field was deactivated as an active duty airfield, however, and a small caretaker unit was assigned to the facility. The War Department had ordered the small caretaker force to dismantle all remaining structures and to sell them as surplus.

=== Civil use ===
In 1920 Ernest Hall, a former instructor at Call Field, operated a flying school at the facility. The Wichita Polo Club briefly used a portion of the land for its polo field. In 1937 the Wichita Falls Junior Chamber of Commerce and American Legion erected a small marker near the gates of the old field in memory of the thirty-four men who were killed during training. For a number of years the site was the scene of memorial services by the Call Field Veterans Association.

Today, the name is perpetuated by a street in Wichita Falls named Call Field Road.

== See also ==
- United States Army World War I Flight Training
