= Ross Field (airfield) =

Ross Field Arcadia Intermediate Landing Field
- Arcadia, California
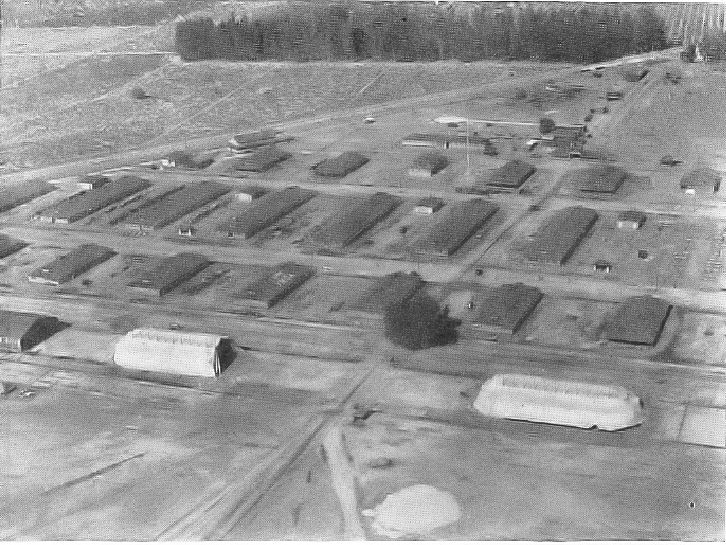
- Army Balloon School at Camp Ross, California, 1918

Site information
- Type: Pilot training airfield
- Controlled by: Air Service, United States Army
- Condition: Redeveloped into urban area

Location
- Coordinates: 34°07′46″N 118°02′24″W

Site history
- Built: 1918
- In use: 1918–1940
- Battles/wars: World War I

Garrison information
- Garrison: Training Section, Air Service

Ross Field is a former World War I military airfield, located 0.8 miles (1.3 km) south-southwest of Arcadia, California. It was one of thirty-two Air Service, United States Army training camps established after the United States entry into World War I in April 1917. It operated as a training field between 1918 until 1919.

== History ==
=== World War I ===
In the early part of June 1918, the Army established an airfield at Arcadia, on the site of the Santa Anita Race Track. it was commanded by Col. W. M. Hensley. Within days, two Balloon Companies from Camp John Wise, San Antonio, Texas; three Balloon Companies from Fort Omaha, Nebraska; and the men of two Balloon Companies from Kelly Field, Texas, arrived and erected a tent camp. Training began quickly and balloons were in the air by the end of June. The hydrogen plant to produce the gas needed to fill the balloons was on line by the end of July. By the end of summer most of the building construction had been completed.

In the rush to get an Army Balloon School on the west coast, the Signal Corps did not consider the Santa Ana winds, which blew in from the desert. These winds created much havoc with the aerial observation, ground training, and balloon handling. They were limited as to how high the balloons could be flown on those very windy days. In order to simulate high altitude observations, they would truck the officers to a camp site at the top of Mt. Wilson to observe live artillery fire from the field below the mountain. The altitude of Mt. Wilson was similar to that of being in a balloon basket. but without the handling issues caused by high winds.

The school was named in November, after Lt. Cleo J. Ross, Army's Air Service: an observer with the 8th Balloon Company. On 26 September 1918, near Brabant, France: while aloft with Lt. Herbert Hudnut, they were attacked by a German Fokker pursuit aircraft, and their balloon burst into flames. Lt. Ross delayed his jump until Lt. Hudnut was clear. After Lt. Ross left the basket, some burning balloon pieces dropped onto his opened parachute: he fell to his death from three thousand feet. Lt. Ross was the only U. S. Army balloon pilot or observer to be killed in action. He was buried in France, near where he fell. None of the companies from Ross Field were assigned for overseas service.

While the Balloon School at Ross Field was in operation, it trained about 200 officers as observers. After the end of World War I, the field was abandoned in the spring of 1919 and most of the men were released from Army service. Those that stayed in, went to Fort Omaha, Scott Field, Illinois, and the remaining equipment and some men went to Brooks Field, Texas. The Army divested itself of Ross Field on 1 March 1926.

=== Inter-War period ===
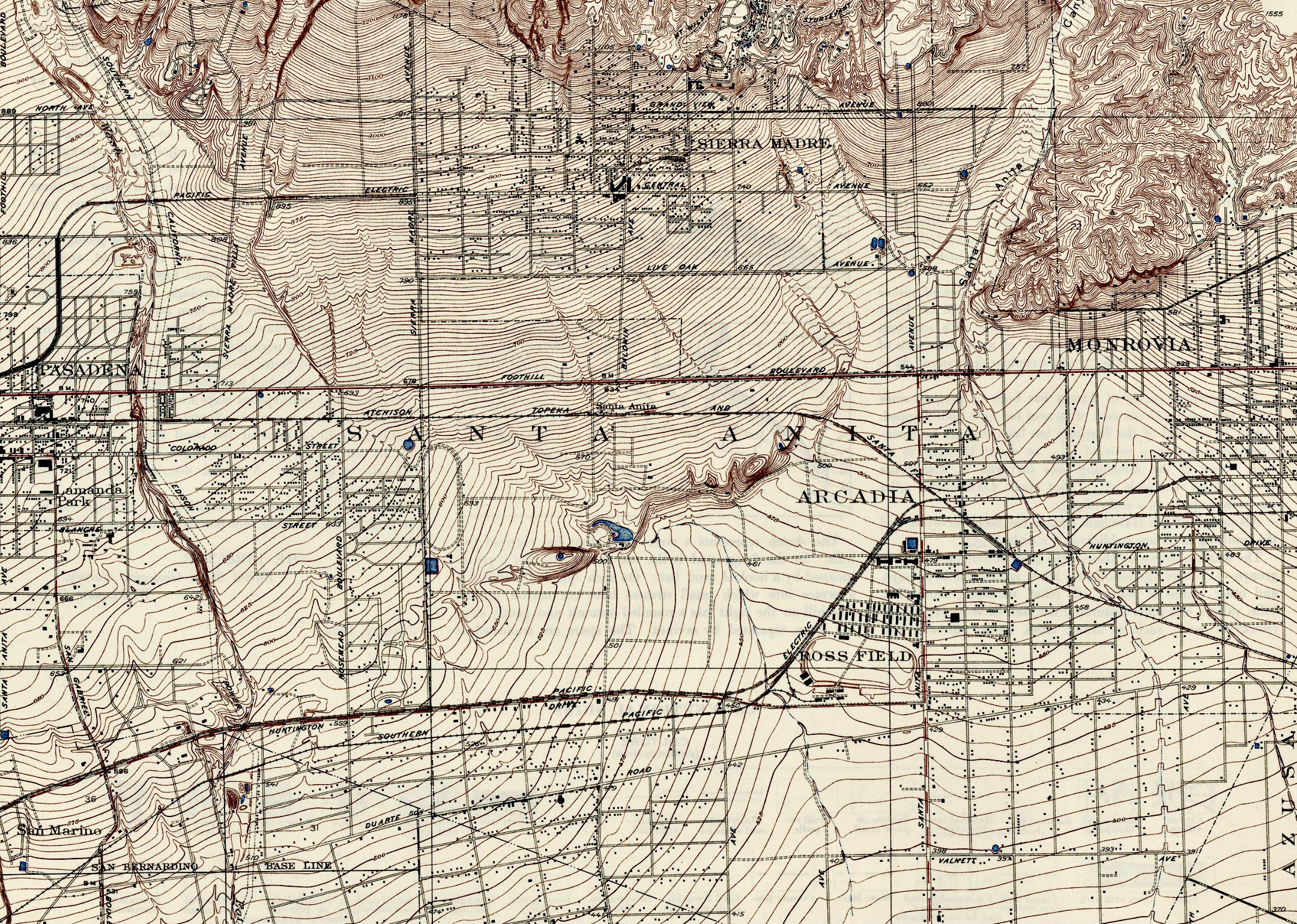
US Geological Survey's map of Santa Anita and Ross Field in 1925.

On 13 December 1919, the United States House of Representatives passed an appropriations bill for $9.6 million for the purchase of additional land at military camps “which are to be made part of the permanent military establishment.” Arcadia Balloon School was allocated $55,600 of this amount.

Ross Field saw some post-World War I reuse as a civil aircraft airfield (Arcadia Intermediate Landing Field), but this was limited to the small size of the airfield, due to its original purpose as a balloon field. Ross Field was used as a private field starting in 1922, and was where aviation legend Pancho Barnes learned to fly. One of the hangars was used in 1930 for filming of the Zeppelin sequence for the movie "Hells Angels". In 1933 the Army donated 183 acres (74 ha) of land from the balloon school to Los Angeles County which would eventually be developed into the Arcadia County Park. The property largely sat idle until 1935, when it was transferred to the city of Arcadia. The airfield was apparently closed by 1940,

The site of Ross Field is located southwest of the intersection of Santa Anita Avenue & Huntington Drive. The land on which Ross Field sat is now mostly a part of the Santa Anita Golf Course.

== Gallery ==
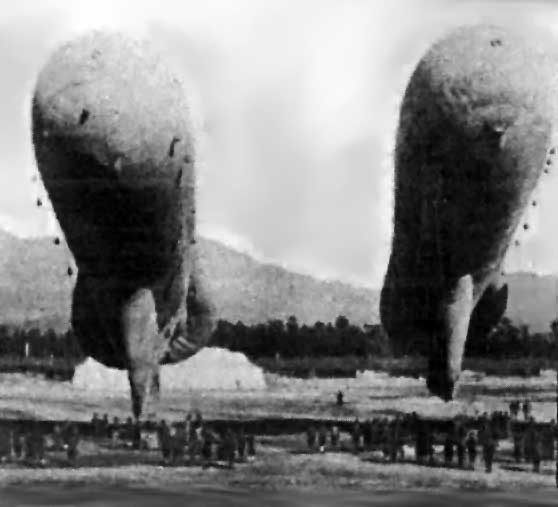
B.F. Goodrich balloons, nicknamed "Elephants" at Ross Field. The hydrogen balloons were 95 feet long with 37,000 cubic feet of gas.

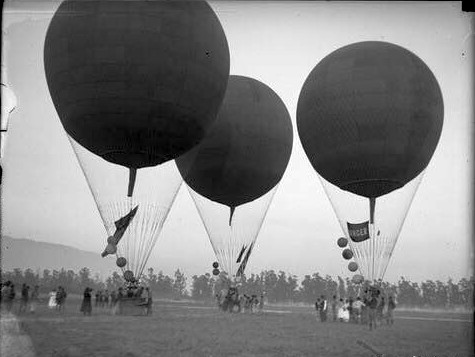
Three balloons at Arcadia Balloon School at Ross Field in 1920.

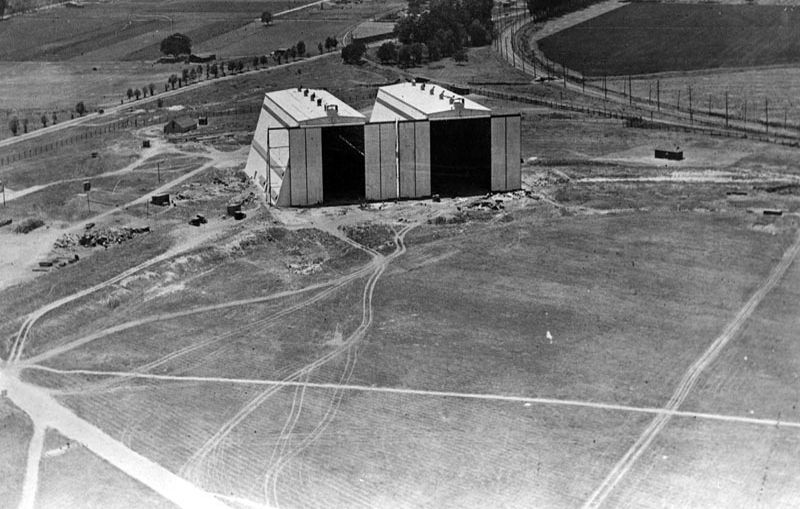
Massive Ross Field balloon hangars of the Arcadia Balloon School in 1922.

== See also ==
- List of Training Section Air Service airfields
