= 193 Squadron =

193 Squadron may refer to:

- 193 Squadron (Israel)
- No. 193 Squadron RAF, United Kingdom
- 193d Aero Squadron, Air Service, United States Army
- 193d Special Operations Squadron, United States Air Force
- VF-193, United States Navy
