= United States Army World War I flight training =

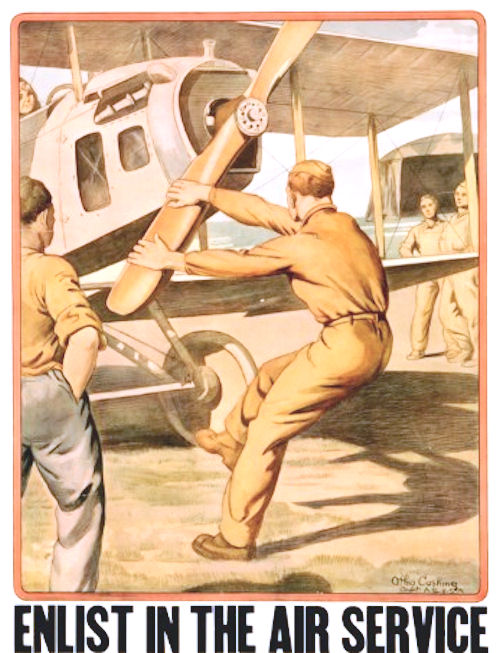
World War I Air Service Recruiting Poster

With the purchase of its first airplane, built and successfully flown by Orville and Wilbur Wright, in 1909 the United States Army began the training of flight personnel. This article describes the training provided in those early years, though World War I, and the immediate years after the war until the establishment of the United States Army Air Corps Flight Training Center in San Antonio, Texas, during 1926.

== Early Signal Corps flight training ==
The history of aviation training in the United States military began on 8 October 1909, when Wilbur Wright began instructing Lieutenants Frank P. Lahm and Frederic E. Humphreys on Signal Corps Airplane No. 1, which the Army had recently purchased from the Wright brothers. Each of the two men received a little over three hours training before soloing on 26 October 1909.

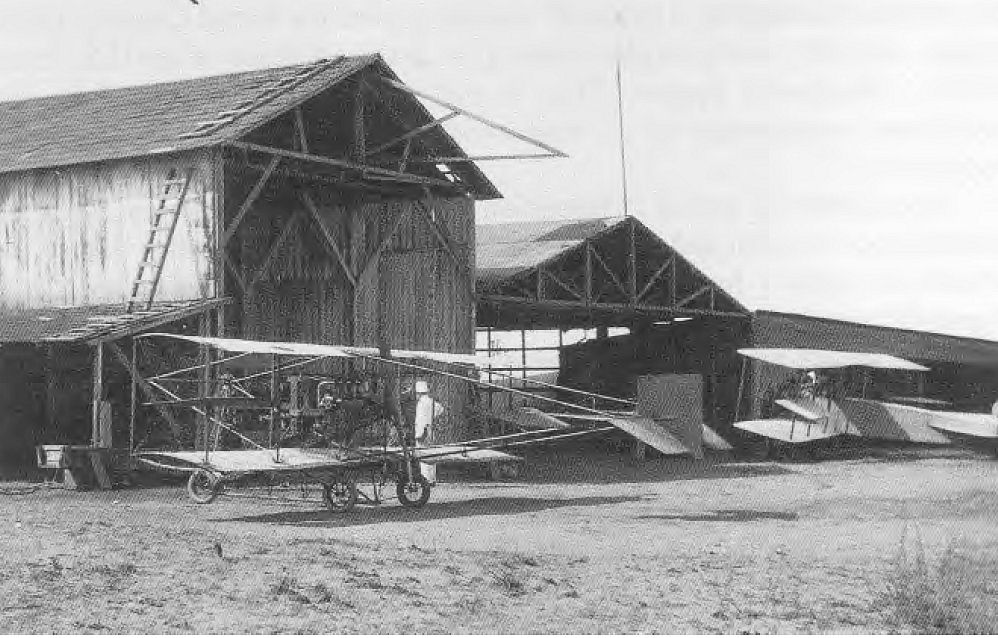
Hangars at the North Island, San Diego, California airfield in 1912. Aircraft shown is a Curtiss Model E (Left) and Curtiss Model G (Right). Later known as Rockwell Field.

The Army airplane trials had been held at Fort Myer, Virginia, in 1908 because of its proximity to Washington, headquarters of the Army and its Aeronautical Division, but the commandant at Fort Myer (a cavalry and field artillery post) refused to relinquish the parade ground for further flight training. He was already disgruntled because the trials had disrupted his summer training schedule of mounted drills. Moreover, the Wright Brothers expressed reluctance to teach beginners to fly on the small, enclosed area.

Another site was found near College Park, Maryland, about eight miles northeast of Washington, D.C. The Signal Corps agreed to lease the site. However, the winter weather meant the College Park site could not be used for year-round training. Various sites in the south and west were used during the early 1910s at Fort Sam Houston, near San Antonio, Texas, North Island, San Diego, California, and Augusta, Georgia. However flying training in the Army remained on a small scale until the USA joined World War I in April 1917. In February 1913, the Aviation School contingent in Augusta, Georgia, along with two pilots who had been training in Palm Beach, Florida, transferred to Texas City, Texas, to join ground forces on duty along the border. This meant that the Army Aviation school was concentrated on North Island, San Diego.

== World War I flight training ==
When the United States entered World War I, the exhausted British and French forces wanted American troops in the trenches of the Western Front as soon as possible. By 1917, aerial warfare was also considered key to the success of the ground forces, and in May 1917, The French, in particular, asked the Americans to also bolster Allied air power. The French wanted the Americans to supply 5,000 pilots and planes, along with 50,000 mechanics to supplement the French and British air forces already in combat.

The training system of the Signal Corps at that time would simply not be capable of producing such numbers. It was decided to establish a system, similar to the British training program of a ground school, then a primary flight program, then a specialized program to train new pilots in the three basic areas that had been developed by the French and British air forces, pursuit, bombardment and observation.

=== Preflight training ===
The Air Service instituted the first phase of air training, ground schooling, first, because a vast reservoir of eager and qualified young men that volunteered for the Air Service, and also because this phase did not require flight instruction or aircraft. The Signal Corps sent several representatives to the University of Toronto School of Military Aeronautics, where they attended classes, listened to reports from the war zone, and gathered instructional materials and regulations used at the school. The Canadians enrolled a new class every week, graduating students in six weeks' time. Successful ground-school graduates proceeded to flying school. The system served to weed out some unfit or incompetent students early, conserving time and instructional and equipment resources. The American committee decided to adopt the Canadian program in its entirety, only lengthening the course to eight weeks (later extending it to ten weeks, then to twelve), using existing American universities for instruction.

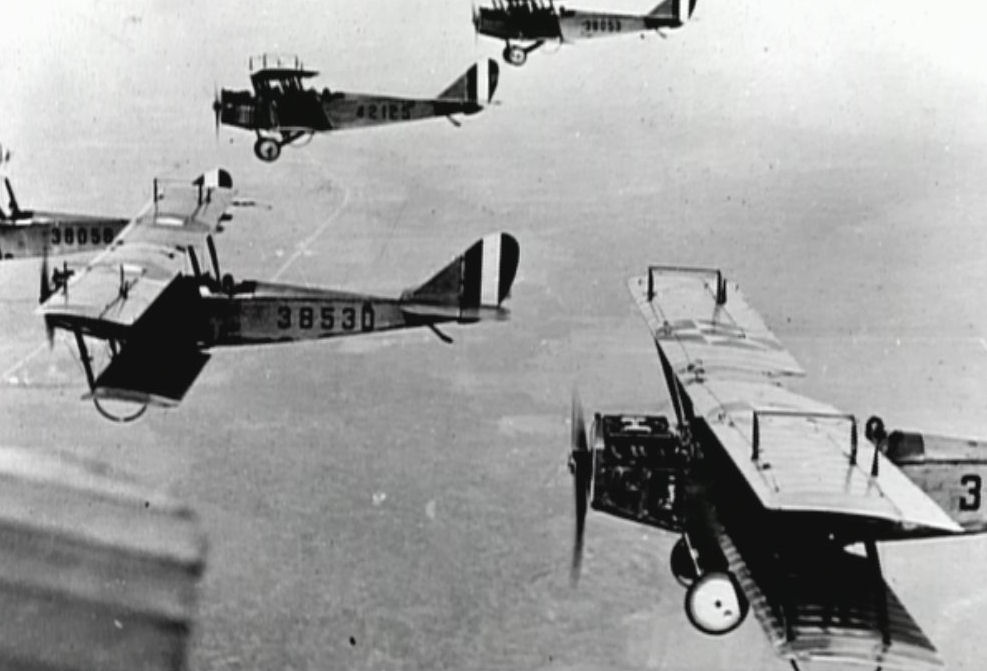
Curtiss JN-4 Jennys training at Kelly Field 1918

During World War I, approximately 23,000 volunteers entered flying cadet training. Eight private and state universities offered preflight (ground school) training. This was conducted at:

- Princeton University, New Jersey
- University of Texas
- Cornell University, New York
- University of California
- University of Illinois
- Massachusetts Institute of Technology
- Georgia School of Technology
- Ohio State University

Upon successful completion of preflight training, flight cadets were sent to Camp John Dick Aviation Concentration Center, located at the Texas State Fairgrounds in Dallas. There the cadets would be processed and placed in groups for their primary flight training.

=== Primary training ===
Primary and advanced training became a major issue with the United States' entry into World War I. In April 1917, the Army had fewer than 100 flying officers and only three flying fields – Hazelhurst Field, Mineola, New York; Camp Kelly, San Antonio, Texas, and Rockwell Field, San Diego, California. There was also a seaplane base, Chandler Field, Essington, Pennsylvania. However, Chandler Field was closed in the summer of 1917 as inadequate, and its personnel and equipment transferred to the new Gerstner Field, Louisiana.

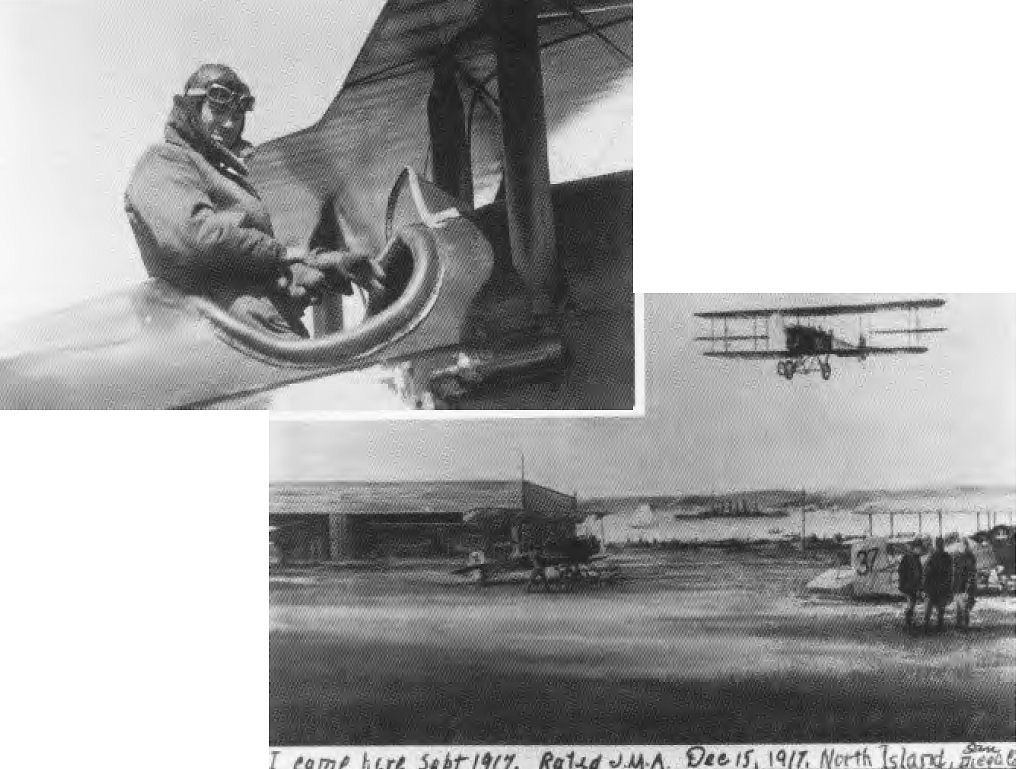
Flight training at North Island (Later Rockwell Field), San Diego, California in December 1917. Upper left photo shows Major Hugh Knerr in the cockpit of a Curtiss JN-4 Jenny upon his arrival at the airfield.

Because it would take a long time to construct adequate training facilities in the United States, Canada provided flying bases at Deseronto and Camp Borden in the Toronto area during the summer of 1917 so that several hundred American cadets could begin primary flying training under the tutelage of the British Royal Flying Corps. The British also operated three flying schools in the United States, located at Camp Taliaferro, Fort Worth, Texas. Among the benefits of the arrangement was the integration of aerial gunnery into the U.S. flight training program. A few Americans who had taken an aerial gunnery course in Canada returned to become instructors at American flying fields. By late 1917, about one-third of Hicks Field, Texas, had been given over to the RFC School of Aerial Gunnery. There, Canadians supplied the planes and equipment to train both Americans and Canadians.

When the United States entered World War I, only the North Island field was a usable military airfield. Essington had been a quarantine station and Mineola, an exposition ground. In May 1917, construction began on Wilbur Wright Field near Dayton, Ohio. Soon afterward, Chanute Field opened at Rantoul, Illinois, as did Selfridge Field near Detroit. By October 31, fourteen facilities had been built, of which nine had begun flight training.

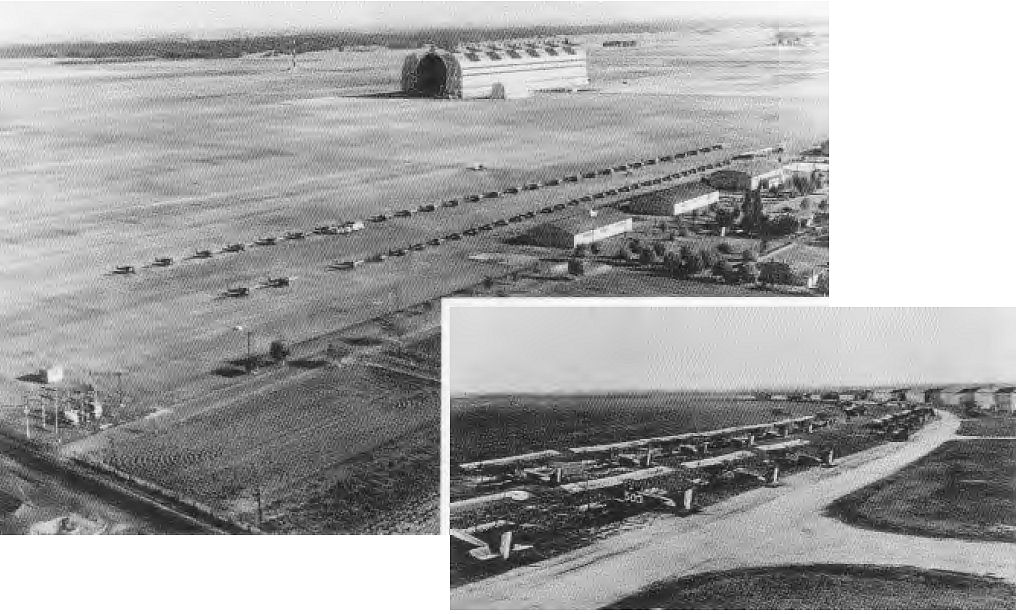
Curtiss JN-4 Jennys at Scott Field, Illinois (left), and Brooks Field, Texas (right)

During 1917, a number of fields provided primary training: Hazelhurst Field (Mineola, New York), Selfridge Field (Mt. Clemens, Michigan), Wilbur Wright Field (Fairfield, Ohio), Chanute Field (Rantoul, Illinois), Scott Field (Belleville, Illinois), Camp Kelly (San Antonio, Texas), and Rockwell Field (the old North Island site in San Diego). Proposed advanced schools at Houston, Texas, and Lake Charles, Louisiana, were also used for primary training until the necessary equipment could be supplied for specialized instruction. All of these new airfields were named after Americans who lost their lives on aeronautical duty, some of which in the days when aviation was in its infancy. Three civilians who were pioneers in aeronautics were also honored.

On December 15, 1917, the five northern schools closed and cadets transferred to the two southern schools. Because of year-round training, southern schools permitted a more even flow of students. Each training field consisted of 100 airplanes and 144 cadets, with several training squadrons and a Headquarters and Headquarters Company (HHC).

Between June and late November 1917, manufacturers met the immediate demand for primary trainers with the delivery of 600 new Curtiss JN-4A Jennies, as the airplane became known. The famous Jenny remained the ubiquitous primary trainer throughout the war. Depending upon the vagaries of weather, equipment, and individual ability, the aspiring pilot needed six to eight weeks, including forty to fifty hours of flying time, to earn his wings.

=== Advanced training ===
Over 11,000 flying cadets received their wings and were commissioned before entering four weeks of advanced training. Advanced training in the United States adopted the scheme used by tactical squadrons in France of classifying flying personnel (pilots or observers, the latter including all non-pilots) according to mission.

- Pursuit instruction took place at Rockwell Field, Carlstrom Field, and Dorr Field

The pursuit pilot, flying a single-seat aircraft, usually at high altitude, was the fighter. The approximately nine-week pursuit course encompassed theoretical and practical ground and air training. Ground instruction included study of the organization and employment of pursuit squadrons; the types and assembly of motors, airplanes, and radios; formation flying; German military organization, tactics, and combat aircraft; and fighting methods, maneuvers, attack, and combat, while alone and in formations.

- Observer instruction took place at Call Field, Post Field, Langley Field, and Selfridge Fields.

The observation pilot was accompanied by an aerial observer who gathered information and photographed enemy positions. Although the observation mission was familiar, for the first time the Air Service had to craft formal crew training curricula. Besides pilots transitioning to new aircraft, non-pilot observers had to be instructed how to gauge the enemy’s activities and to photograph and, frequently, to shoot. Thus, in addition to programs for piloting and gunnery – the two elements of pursuit training – observation required teaching the additional skills of radio communication, photography, and artillery spotting.

- Bombing instruction took place at Ellington Field and Gerstner Fields.

The bombing pilot and bombardier also flew a double-seat airplane across enemy lines, often at night. Because the Army leadership so tardily and reluctantly developed bombardment as an acknowledged branch of aerial warfare, it was the last section to be organized, and it initially lacked most essential equipment. But it was also subject to less pressure since the AEF requested only two bombing pilots for every five pursuit and three observation pilots. Classwork included the study of organizations, map and compass reading, ballistics, photography, tactics, day and night bombing, preparations for raid, miniature range exercises, and study of and then actually dropping dummy and explosive bombs. After commissioning, the bombardier and the pilot held equal rank, and both continued for two more weeks of aerial gunnery training.

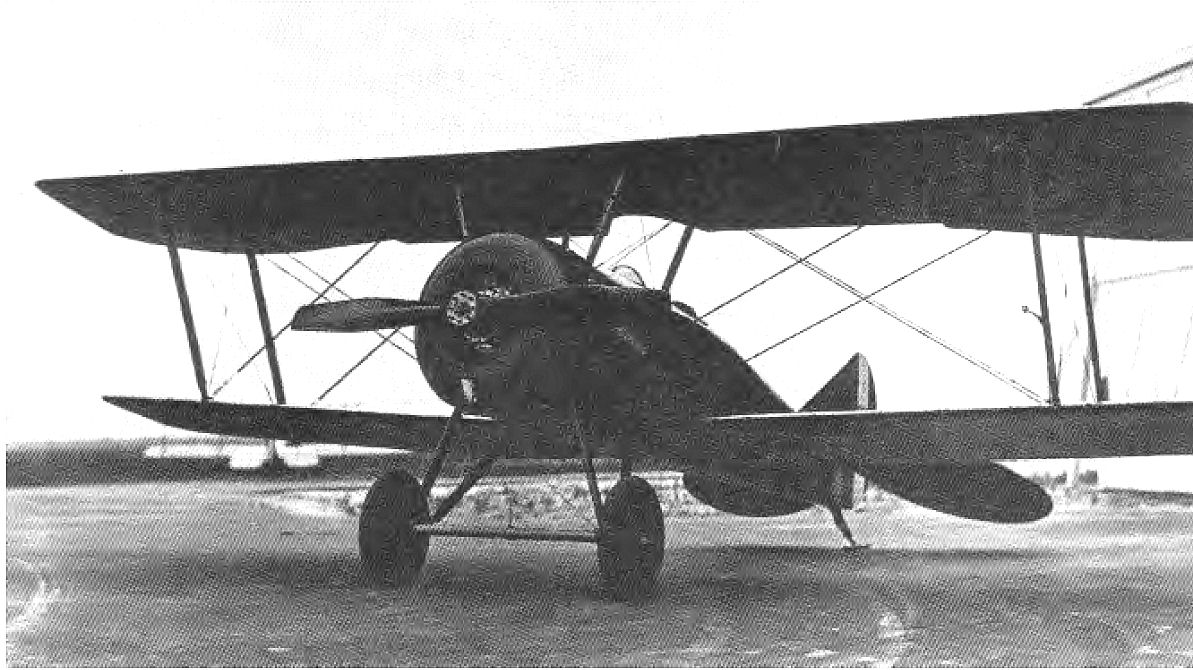
Thomas-Morse S-4 Scout, used for pursuit training, Rockwell Field, California

Supposedly, all combat airmen had taken some aerial gunnery instruction. Advanced gunnery therefore followed the pursuit pilot at the pursuit schools and the others at advanced aerial gunnery schools. The burden on the Army, as it tried to build the capability for advanced training in the United States, was ultimately insurmountable. Airfields might be used for primary as well as for advanced training, or they might be converted from one type to the other as weather conditions dictated, as equipment became available, or as demand for specialists increased or decreased.

By the end of May 1918, a bombing school was located at Ellington Field near Houston; a pursuit school at Gerstner Field, Lake Charles, Louisiana, and three other fields to be converted from primary to pursuit; observer schools were at Langley Field, Virginia, and at Post Field, Fort Sill. There were gunnery schools at Selfridge Field, Mt. Clemens, Michigan; at Ellington Field; at Taliaferro Field No. 1, Fort Worth, Texas; and at Wilbur Wright Field, Fairfield, Ohio, which also served as an armorers' and instructors' school.

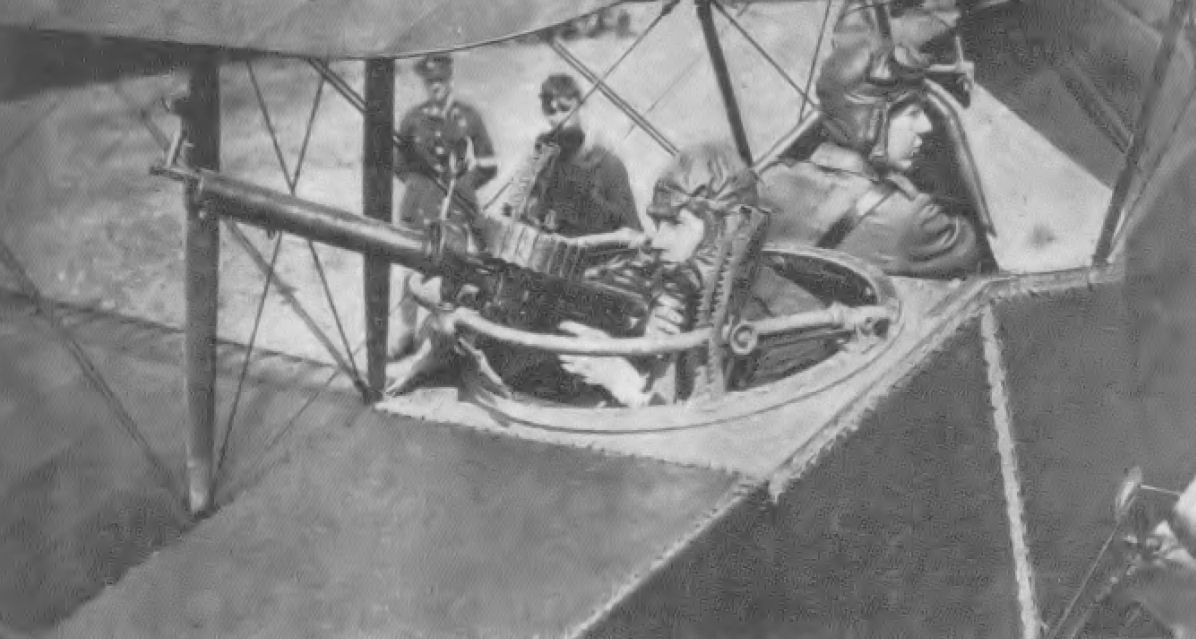
Observer-Gunner training, Selfridge Field, Michigan

The Training Section also established auxiliary schools at Wilbur Wright Field taught armorers, Brooks Field and Scott Field contained the principal instructor's schools. Radio instruction was taught at Carnegie Tech University, Pittsburgh, Austin University, Texas and Columbia University, New York. A photography school at Langley Field was also developed.

Because the United States was in World War I only for a year and a half and entered it so unprepared, only about 1,000 of the 11,000 aviators trained during the war were actually involved in operations against the enemy. Most of these operations consisted of artillery observation or air-to-air combat. Rapid demobilization followed the end of World War I, and many of these flying schools were closed and turned over to local authorities as airports, although some remained in service though the 1920s, World War II, and into the modern era.

=== Flying fields (United States) ===
==== Aviation Section, U.S. Air Service ====
- Baker Field

Rochester, New York
43°11′56″N 77°37′51″W
43°07′08″N 77°40′21″W
United States Aerial School of Photography, Eastman Kodak Park, Technical Training
Baker's Field: Aerial photography training

- Barron Field (Camp Taliaferro Field #2)**

Everman, Texas
32°37′32″N 97°18′17″W
Named after Cadet R. J Barron
Construction started 18 September 1917; flying began 20 November 1917.
Primary Flying School: 8-week course

- Bolling Field

Anacostia, District of Columbia
38°50′34″N 77°00′58″W
Advanced Flying School

- Brooks Field

San Antonio, Texas
29°20′30″N 98°26′06″W
Named after Cadet Private Sidney Johnson Brooks, Jr
Construction started 11 December 1917
Permanent facility, Aviation Flight Instructor School.

- Call Field

Wichita Falls, Texas
33°52′18″N 98°33′18″W
Named after 1st Lieutenant Loren H. Call
Construction started 4 September 1917; flying began 1 December 1917
Temporary flying field, Observation School: Advanced flying, 5-week course for observers, 4-week course for pilots
Field ordered closed, 11 July 1919

- Carlstrom Field

Arcadia, Florida
27°08′18″N 81°48′10″W
Named after 1st Lieutenant Victor Carlstrom
Construction started 11 December 1917
Permanent facility, Advanced Pursuit School: 6-week course

- Carruthers Field (later Benbrook Field) (Camp Taliaferro Field #3)**

Benbrook, Texas
32°40′41″N 97°27′36″W
Named after Cadet W. K. Carruthers
Construction started 18 September 1917; flying began November 1917.
Primary Flying School: 8-week course

- Chanute Field

Rantoul, Illinois
40°17′39″N 88°08′35″W
Named after Octave Chanute, Pioneer Aviation Engineer
Construction started 31 May 1917; flying began 14 July 1917.
Permanent flying field, Primary Flying School: 8-week course

- Dorr Field

Arcadia, Florida
27°12′26″N 81°40′12″W
Named after Cadet Private Stephen H. Dorr
Construction started 26 December 1917
Permanent flying field
Primary Flying School
Advanced Pursuit School
Aerial Gunnery School: 3-week course for pursuit graduates

- Eberts Field

Lonoke, Arkansas
34°47′43″N 91°55′09″W
Named after Captain Melchior Eberts
Construction started 11 December 1917
Temporary flying field, Primary Flying School: 8-week course
Closed, May 1919

- Ellington Field

Houston, Texas
29°36′26″N 95°09′50″W
Named after 2d Lieutenant E. L. Ellington
Construction started 18 September 1917; flying began, 15 December 1917
Permanent flying field,
Armorers' School; Bombing School: 8-week course for bombers, ll-week course for pilots
Aerial Gunnery School for Bombing, 3-week course
Radio School: For training advanced radio operators

- Emerson Field

Columbia, South Carolina; located on the military reservation of Camp Jackson
34°00′56″N 81°54′44″W
Named in honor of Lt. Wiliam K. B. Emerson
Established in connection with field artillery brigade firing center at Camp Jackson.

- France Field

Cocoa Walk, Canal Zone
09°21′24″N 79°52′03″W
Advanced Flying School for tropical flying

- Gerstner Field

Lake Charles, Louisiana
30°07′07″N 93°04′48″W
Named after 2d Lieutenant Fredrick J. Gerstner
Construction of field started 22 September; flying began, 15 December 1917.
Temporary flying field
Advanced Bombing School: 8-week course
Advanced Pursuit School
Radio School: Advanced course for radio telegraph officers.
Closed, May 1919

- Kelly Field

San Antonio, Texas
29°22′34″N 98°34′53″W
Named after 2d Lieutenant George E. M. Kelly
Construction started 24 July 1917; flying began 11 August 1917.
Permanent flying field, under lease 1917-19, purchased, 1919
Primary Flying School: 8-week course
Aviation Mechanics School
Concentration Camp, Air Service Indoctrination training
Ground School for Adjutants, Supply Officers, and Engineers.

- Love Field

Dallas, Texas
32°50′56″N 96°51′02″W
Named after 1st Lieutenant Moss Lee Love
Construction started 26 September 1917; flying began 8 December 1917.
Temporary flying field
Bombing School, Advanced flying, 8-week course for bombers, ll-week course for pilots
Reserve Military Aviators' Concentration School indoctrination training
Closed, May 1919

- March Field

Riverside, California
33°53′22″N 117°15′32″W
Named after 2d Lieutenant Peyton C. March, Jr.
Construction started 23 March 1918; flying began, 15 June 1918.
Permanent flying field, Primary Flying School: 8-week course

- Mather Field

Sacramento, California
38°33′30″N 121°18′00″W
Named after 2d Lieutenant Carl Spencer Mather
Construction authorized 3 March 1918; flying began 17 June 1918.
Permanent flying field, Primary Flying School: 8-week course

- Park Field

Millington, Tennessee
35°21′15″N 89°52′07″W
Named after 1st Lieutenant Joseph D. Park
Construction started 18 September 1917; flying began 1 December 1917.
Temporary flying field, Primary Flying School: 8-week course

- Payne Field

West Point, Mississippi
33°39′56″N 88°37′57″W
Named after Captain Dewitt Payne
Construction started, 8 February 1918; flying began, 20 May 1918.
Temporary flying field
Pursuit School: Advanced flying, 6-week course
Reserve Military Aviators' Concentration School Indoctrination Training
Closed, May 1919

- Post Field

Fort Sill, Lawton Oklahoma
34°38′55″N 98°23′58″W
Named after 2d Lieutenant Henry B. Post
Construction started 8 August 1917, training began January 1918
Permanent flying field, located on military reservation of Fort Sill.
Balloon School: for the training of balloon organizations and balloon observers
Observation School: 5-week course for observers, 4-week course for pilots
Radio School: Advanced course for radio telegraph officers

- Rich Field

Waco, Texas
31°32′45″N 97°11′16″W
Named after 2d Lieutenant Perry C. Rich
Construction started 11 September 1917; flying began, 1 December 1917.
Temporary flying field, Primary Flying School: 8-week course
Closed, May 1919

- Rockwell Field

San Diego, California
Pre-World War I Flying School, established 1913.
Named after 2d Lieutenant Lewis G. Rockwell
32°41′52″N 117°12′47″W
Aerial Gunnery School
Primary Flying School: 8-week course
Advanced Pursuit School: 6-week course

==== First Reserve Wing ====
Headquarters: Hazelhurst Field. The First Reserve Wing. The Wing controlled all flying fields on Long Island; its principal function, aside from the defense of New York City, was the training of squadrons as units for overseas duty and development of teamwork in advanced flying

- Brindley Field

Commack, Long Island, New York
40°50′34″N 73°17′34″W
Named in honor of Maj. Oscar A. Brindley
Auxiliary of Hazelhurst Field. Used for advanced flying under supervision of commanding officer, 1st Provisional Wing.

- Damm Field

Babylon, Long Island, New York
40°41′44″N 73°19′32″W
Named in honor of Lt. Col. Henry J. Damm
Auxiliary of Hazelhurst Field. Used for advanced flying under supervision of commanding officer, 1st Provisional Wing.

- Roosevelt Field

Mineola, Long Island, New York
40°44′31″N 73°35′56″W
Initially named Westbury Plateau or as the Plateau at Hazelhurst Field. Named in honor of 1st Lt. Quentin Roosevelt
Auxiliary of Hazelhurst Field. Used for advanced flying under supervision of commanding officer, 1st Provisional Wing.

- Lufbery Field

Wantagh, Long Island, New York
40°41′01″N 73°30′36″W
Named in honor of Maj. Raoul V. Lufbery
Auxiliary of Hazelhurst Field. Used for advanced flying under supervision of commanding officer, 1st Provisional Wing.

- Hazelhurst Field (Later: Mitchel Field)

Mineola, Long Island, New York
40°44′32″N 73°35′56″W
Named after 2d Lieutenant Leighton W. Hazelhurst
Established, June 1916 on property previously used by New York National Guard as an aviation field (Mineola Field). Flying started June 1916
Temporary flying field under lease.

Aviation Concentration Center: Located at Garden City. Used as reception center for Air Service recruits; Facilitated Air Service units for the purposes of embarkation to Europe, and after the armistice in November 1918, for the purposes of debarkation.
Consolidated with Aviation Concentration Center (Renamed Air Service Depot) at Garden City and combined with Mitchel Field, 5 April 1919.

==== Second Reserve Wing ====
Headquarters, Park Place, Houston, Texas

- Selfridge Field

Mount Clemens, Michigan
42°37′15″N 82°50′21″W
Named after 1st Lieutenant Thomas Selfridge
Construction started, 3 July 1917; flying began, 14 July 1917.
Permanent flying field
Aerial Gunnery School for Observation Graduates: 3-week course
Aerial Gunnery School for Fighting Observers: 4-week course

- Scott Field

Bellevielle, Illinois
38°32′26″N 89°51′11″W
Named after Corporal Frank S. Scott, the first enlisted person to be killed in an aviation crash.
Construction started, 4 July 1917; flying began, 12 September 1917
Permanent flying field, Primary Flying School: 8-week course

- Souther Field

Americus, Georgia
32°06′41″N 84°11′13″W
Named after Major Henry Souther
Construction started 19 February 1918; flying began, 1 June 1918.
Temporary flying field, Primary Flying School: 8-week course

- Camp Taliaferro**

Named after 1st Lieutenant Walter R. Taliaferro

Hicks Field, Saginaw Texas (Field #1)
32°55′51″N 97°24′42″W
Named after Charles Hicks
Aerial Gunnery School for Army Corps Pilots: 3-week course
Operated by: Royal Flying Corps, taken over by Air Service 30 April 1918. On May 1, 1918, each field was given independent status. Closed, May 1919

- Taylor Field

Montgomery, Alabama
32°18′14″N 86°07′18″W
Named after Captain Ralph L. Taylor
Construction started 11 December 1917.
Temporary flying field, Primary Flying School: 8-week course

- Camp Dick

Dallas, Texas
32°46′55″N 96°45′56″W
World War I use of Texas State Fairgrounds
Aviation Classification Center
Cadet Gunnery Camp

- Wilbur Wright Field

Riverside, Ohio
39°46′45″N 84°06′16″W
Named after Wilbur Wright, Aviation Pioneer
Construction of field started 27 May 1917; flying began, 14 July 1917 and continued to 15 December 1917; resumed 15 April 1918
Permanent flying field Placed under Technical Section, Department of Military Aeronautics
Armorers' School, for the training of enlisted armorers and armament officers
Aerial Gunnery Course
Field, school, and depot consolidated 4 January 1919 and designated Wilbur Wright Air Service Depot.

- Langley Field

Hampton, Virginia
37°04′59″N 76°21′33″W
Named after Samuel Langley, Pioneer Aviator
Construction started 20 June 1917
Permanent flying field and balloon station
Experimental Engineering Department
Observation; School: 5-week course for observers, 4-week course for pilots
School of Photography

** Camp Taliaferro was a flight training center under the direction of the Air Service which had and administration center near what is now the Will Rodgers Memorial Center in Fort Worth, Texas. Flying airfields consisted of Hicks Field near Saginaw Texas where US flight cadets and Canadian aerial gunnery students trained, Canadian and British cadets trained at Barron Field in Everman and at Carruthers Field in Benbrook. From 1917 to 1918 British Royal Flying Corps instructors trained 6000 flight cadets at the facilities making up Camp Taliaferro.

==== Balloon observers schools ====
- Fort Omaha

Omaha, Nebraska
41°18′24″N 95°57′25″W
Established March 1917,
Permanent post, United States Army Balloon School (for training balloon observers only)

- Ross Field

Arcadia, California
34°07′47″N 118°02′24″W
Named after 2d Lieutenant Cleo J. Ross
Field established 3 June 1918
Permanent military reservation
School for Enlisted Balloon Specialists
School for Balloon Company Commanders and Observers

- Camp John Wise

San Antonio, Texas
29°25′26″N 98°29′37″W
Named after John Wise, Pioneer Balloonist
Opened 20 January 1918
Temporary aviation camp, United States Army Balloon School
School for enlisted specialists to be assigned to balloon companies
Course in maneuvering for officers of balloon companies.
Closed, January 1919

- Army Balloon School

Lee Hall, Virginia
37°11′31″N 76°34′18″W

- Army Balloon Detachment

Fort Monroe, Virginia
37°00′13″N 76°18′27″W

- Army Balloon Detachment

Camp McClellan, Anniston, Alabama
33°42′39″N 85°44′14″W

- Army Balloon Detachment

Camp Knox, Stithton, Kentucky
37°53′34″N 85°58′28″W

- Army Balloon Detachment

Camp Jackson, Columbia, South Carolina
34°02′21″N 80°49′20″W

==== Other training airfields ====
- Chandler Field

Essington, Pennsylvania
39°51′38″N 75°18′00″W
Named after 1st Lieutenant Rex Chandler
Established 1 April 1917
Temporary flying field, Seaplane pilot training
Closed November 1917

- Chapman Field

Miami, Florida
25°38′22″N 80°17′32″W
Named after Victor Chapman, First American aviator killed in World War I (1916)
Construction extended from 15 May 1918, to 19 April 1919.
Aerial Gunnery School

- McCook Field

Dayton, Ohio
39°46′33″N 84°11′27″W
Named after Alexander McDowell McCook
Construction of field started, 6 October 1917.
Temporary aviation experimental station, under lease
Experimental Engineering Department
Bureau of Aircraft Production District Office

- Penn Field

Austin, Texas
30°13′36″N 97°45′36″W
Named after Cadet Eugene Penn
Under jurisdiction of the University of Texas, Austin; Opened 18 March 1918
Primary pilot training (Never made operational)
Operator's Radio School
Closed, 8 August 1919

- Air Service School For Radio

Columbia University
New York, New York
40°48′27″N 73°57′43″W
Officer's Radio School

- Air Service School For Radio

Carnegie Institute of Technology
Pittsburgh, Pennsylvania
40°26′35″N 79°56′36″W
Mechanic's Radio School

- East Field

Otay Mesa, San Diego, California
32°34′20″N 116°58′48″W
Named in honor of Maj. W. J. East
Gunnery Range, Axillary of Rockwell Field

- Godman Field

Stithton, Kentucky; Located on reservation of Camp Knox
37°54′25″N 85°58′20″W
Named in honor of 1st Lt. Louis K. Godman
Established in connection with field artillery brigade firing center at Camp Knox.

- Pope Field

Fayettefille, North Carolina; located on military reservation of Camp Bragg.
35°10′15″N 79°00′52″W
Named in honor of 1st Lt. Harley Halbert Pope
established in connection with field artillery brigade firing center at Camp Bragg.

- Ream Field

Oneonta, California
32°33′59″N 117°06′42″W
Named in honor of Maj. William R. Ream
Axillary of Rockwell Field

- Reilly Field

Anniston, Alabama; located on military reservation of Camp McClellan
33°44′44″N 85°46′50″W
Named in honor of Capt. Henry J. Reilly
Established in connection with field artillery brigade firing center at Camp McClellan

- Valentine Field

Labelle, Florida
26°44′26″N 81°25′41″W
Named in honor of 2d Lt. Herman W. Valentine
Auxiliary of Carlstrom Field

==== Support facilities ====
- Aviation General Supply Depot, Middletown, Pennsylvania

The depot made overseas shipments and also supplied materiel to Bolling Field, Langley Field, and First Provisional Wing at Garden City.

- Aviation General Supply Depot, Americus, Georgia

Adjacent to Souther Field. Depot supplied materiel to aviation fields and in particular to Park Field, Taylor Field, Payne Field, Carlstrom Field, and Dorr Field.

- Aviation General Supply Depot, Little Rock, Arkansas

Its activity consisted in storing airplane parts and supplying materiel for Post Field, Call Field, Eberts Field, Love Field, Hicks Field, Barron Field, Rich Field, and Carruthers Field

- Aviation General Supply Depot, Wilbur Wright Field, Ohio

Supplied materiel to flying fields; in particular to Chanute Field, Scott Field, Selfridge Field, Wilbur Wright Field, and the Aviation Repair Depot at Indianapolis, Indiana.

- Aviation General Supply Depot, Houston, Texas

Its activity consisted in storing obsolete materiel and providing additional storage space for planes, spares, and engines in excess of the storage facilities at nearby Ellington Field.

- Aviation General Supply Depot, Kelly Field, Texas

The depot operated as an equipment station, supplying in particular, Kelly Field, Brooks Field, Ellington Field and Gerstner Field.

- Aviation General Supply Depot, Los Angeles, California

Supplied March Field, Mather Field, Rockwell Field, and Army Balloon School at Arcadia (Ross Field).

- Aviation General Supply Depot, Sacramento, California

Used for storage of aviation supplies

- Aviation Repair Depot, Montgomery, Alabama

Depot repaired wrecked planes and engines; also overhauled planes and engines that had flown the required number of hours.

- Aviation Repair Depot, Indianapolis, Indiana

Depot repaired wrecked planes and engines and overhauling planes and engines when required

- Aviation Repair Depot, Dallas, Texas

Activities consisted in repairing and overhauling airplanes and engines for Barron Field, Brooks Field, Call Field, Carruthers Field, Ellington Field, Gerstner Field, Kelly Field, Love Field, Post Field, Rich Field, and Hicks Field. Used Love Field for test flights of repaired machines.

=== American Expeditionary Force training ===
Upon deployment to France, additional training was conducted by a series of Aviation Instruction Centers (AIC)s in France using French and British aircraft that were used in the combat squadrons at the front. This supplemental training was provided because of a lack of necessary equipment in the United States.

Early intentions to conduct only advanced training in Europe immediately went awry. Because the structure for primary flight training had yet to be erected in the United States and because European facilities appeared to have space, it was arranged for several hundred American cadets to be admitted to French training schools, and he contacted the British and Italians to obtain similar commitments. The English accommodated about 200 men, and approximately 500 cadets went to Foggia, Italy, for primary training.

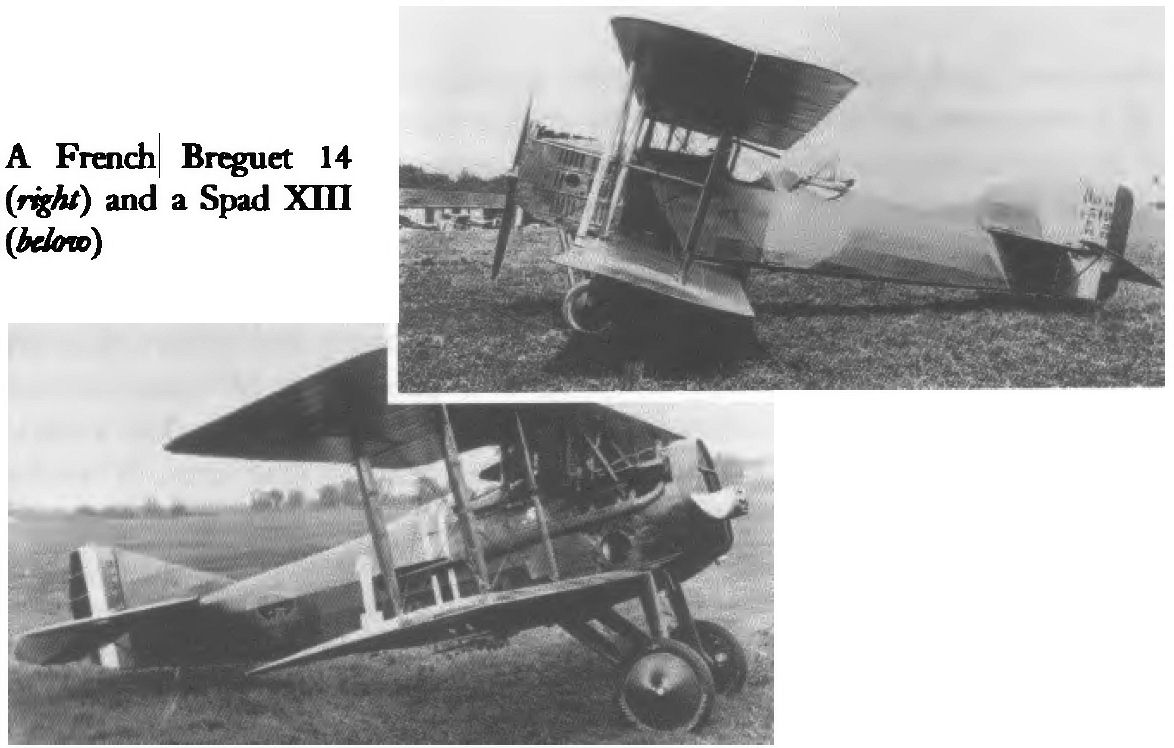

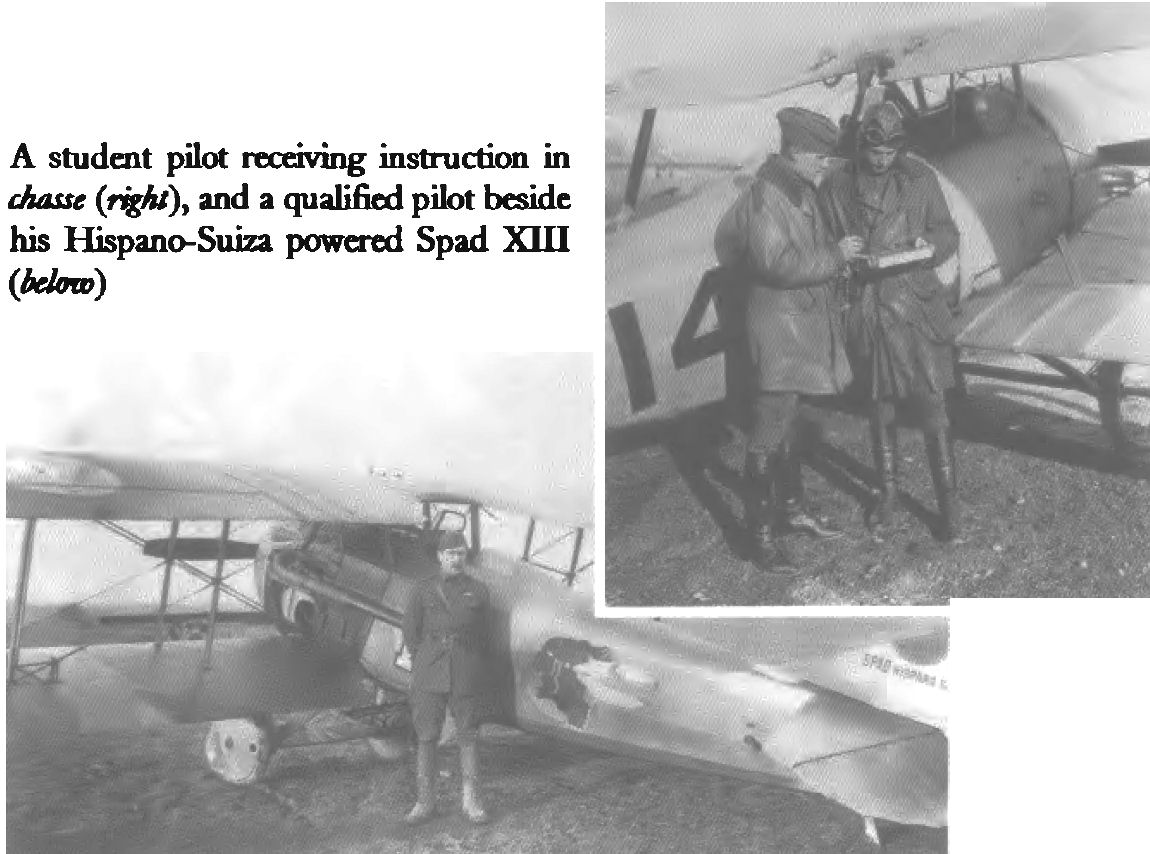
Training aircraft, Issoudun airfield

The largest number of men found themselves in France. The Air Service partially gave over the Third Aviation Instruction Center (3d AIC) at Issoudun Airdrome, France, originally intended for advanced instruction, to primary training. Negotiations for aviation schools at Tours Airdrome and Clermont-Ferrand Airdrome to be turned over to the U.S. Army – the former for observation and the latter for bombardment – were also in progress. But Tours, too, was converted to primary training. The old French aero school, located on a plateau across the river at Tours, came into American hands as the 2d AIC in September, and it remained the principal American primary flying school in France until the program's end.

Tours and Issoudun conducted primary training for as many cadets as possible, even though some were left to languish, while other European schools also accepted trainees at overflow levels. Some new arrivals stayed at the Beaumont Barracks in Tours; others lodged at St. Maixent; still others were quartered at AEF headquarters in Paris. In January, 1918 the Training Section attempted to introduce some order by having all untrained cadets, of whom no more were authorized, removed from the schools and sent to St. Maixent, site of an old French barracks. It was to serve as the concentration point for all aviation troops arriving in the AEF.

The French employed a variety of aircraft, in combat and in training. Americans at Avord learned on the Bleriot or the Caudron; promising cadets then passed to the much admired Nieuport for advanced pursuit training.I4 The French could most easily spare the Caudron G-3 for the American primary school at Tours, which was itself modeled directly on the Caudron course at Avord. The Caudron G-3 was a single-engine reconnaissance airplane of 1914 vintage, already outmoded by bomber models developed from it.

The Italians agreed to host as many as 500 cadets in a school at Foggia, about 200 miles southeast of Rome.” In September 1917, the school, officially the 8th AIC under joint American and Italian jurisdiction, began training the first detachment of forty-six cadets, all honor graduates of American ground schools. The detachment had been sent first to Avord, but when plans for training in Italy crystallized.

Aviation Instruction Centers

- 1st Aviation Instruction Center (1st AIC)

Reuilly Barracks, Paris (Headquarters)
Mechanics Training School
Schools located at following factories:

Hispano-Suiza Factory
Renault Factory
Breguet Factory
Brasier Factory
Nieuport Factory
Bleriot Factory

- 2d Aviation Instruction Center (2d AIC)

Tours Aerodrome
47°25′50″N 00°43′08″E
Preliminary observation, radio, photography and gunnery school
Located near: Tours, Centre
Now: Tours Val de Loire Airport

- 3d Aviation Instruction Center (3d AIC)

Issoudun Aerodrome
46°57′16″N 01°59′18″E
Advanced pursuit and observation school
Located near: Issoudun, Centre

- 4th Aviation Instruction Center (4th AIC)

Avord Aerodrome
47°03′14″N 02°37′59″E
Advanced flying school
Location: 1.7 miles (2.7 km) NW of Avord, Centre
Now: Avord Air Base (BA 102)

- 5th Aviation Instruction Center (5th AIC)

Location Bron (Rhone), France
45°43′46″N 04°56′20″E
Mechanics training school (closed late 1917)*

- 6th Aviation Instruction Center (6th AIC)

Pau (Basses-Pyrenees), France
43°22′19″N 00°25′20″W
Advanced flying school

- 7th Aviation Instruction Center (7th AIC)

Clermont-Ferrand Aerodrome
45°47′08″N 03°09′45″E
Bombardment training school
Located near Clermont-Ferrand, Auvergne
Now: Clermont-Ferrand Airport

- 8th Aviation Instruction Center (8th AIC)

Foggia Aerodrome
41°26′17″N 15°32′38″E
Foggia, Italy

* The 5th Aviation Instruction Center at Bron (now Lyon–Bron Airport) was located at the French Air Service Mechanics School. The first Americans were sent to the school in mid-September, 1917. The school was overcrowded and was lacking in proper quarters and mess facilities for the Americans. Also a lack of English-speaking instructors led to the decision to withdraw the Americans from the school. Students were sent to the 3d AIC at Issodun, with the last departing on 4 December 1917.

Artillery Aerial Observation Schools

- 1st Artillery Aerial Observation School (1st AAOS)

47°56′43″N 02°09′00″W
Ecoles De Saint-Cyr Coetquidan (Camp de Coetquidan), France

- 2d Artillery Aerial Observation School (2d AAOS)

44°49′42″N 00°42′56″W
Sourge (Camp de Souge), France
Now: Bordeaux–Mérignac Airport

- 3d Artillery Aerial Observation School (3d AAOS)

48°44′11″N 04°08′55″E
Haussimont (Mailly), France

- 4th Artillery Aerial Observation School (4th AAOS)

47°45′43″N 02°46′56″W
Locmaria-Grand-Champ (Camp De Meucon), France

- 5th Artillery Aerial Observation School (5th AAOS)

47°09′21″N 06°17′38″E
Le Valdahon (Camp La Valdehon), France

- Artillery Officers School (Aviation Detachment)

47°11′27″N 00°03′11″W
Saint-Cyr-en-Bourg (Saumur Artillery School Aerodrome), France
Observation School for Artillery Officers

Miscellaneous AEF Schools

- Cazaux Aviation Instruction Center

Cazaux Aerodrome, France
44°32′01″N 01°07′34″W
Now: Cazaux Air Base (BA 120)

- St. John-de-Monts Aerial Gunnery School

Saint-Jean-de-Monts Aerodrome, France
46°45′53″N 02°02′09″W

- I Corps Aeronautical School**

Gondrecourt-le-Château, France

- II Corps Aeronautical School

Chatillon-Sur-Seine Aerodrome, France
47°50′54″N 04°34′50″E

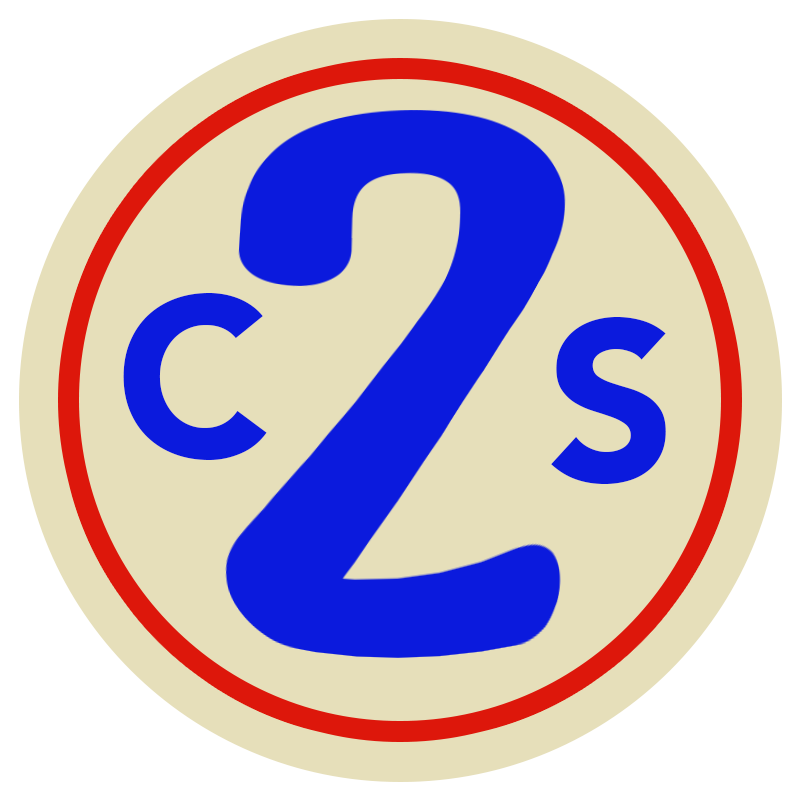
Insignia of the II Corps Schools which included the Artillery and Aeronautical Schools at Chatillon-sur-Seine.

** The I Corps Aeronautical School was a temporary school, located at the French Air Service machine-gun training school at Gondrecourt-le-Château. About 225 men were sent to the school during March and April, 1918.

=== Postwar reorganization ===
In early 1919 the Air Service's hopes ran high. The War Department determined to purchase and maintain fifteen flying fields and five balloon schools for training purposes. Of those, the government already owned Rockwell, Langley, Post (at Fort Sill), and Kelly Field No. 1. Early plans anticipated opening several primary schools and separate sites for advanced training in bombardment, observation, pursuit, and gunnery. However rapid peacetime demobilization led to the closure of the leased wartime facilities and by the end of 1919 most were deactivated as an active duty airfields, and a small caretaker unit was assigned to the facilities for administrative reasons.

== See also ==
- 10th School Group

Flying component of the Air Service Advanced Flying School, formed 1922

- 11th School Group

Flying component of the Air Service Primary Flying School, formed 1922

- Army Air Forces Flying Training Command

Formed 1926 as the Air Corps Training Center

- Army Air Forces Technical Training Command
- American observation balloon service in World War I
