= Dorr Field =

Former US military airfield in DeSoto County, Florida

- Part of Army Air Force Training Command
- DeSoto County, east of Arcadia, Florida
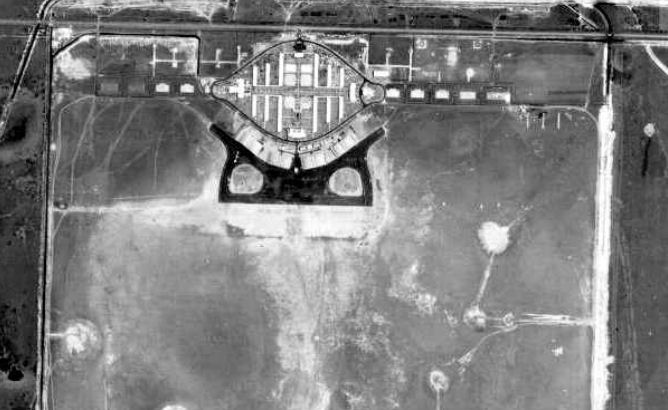
- Aerial photograph of Dorr Field, Florida, 1942. Note the World War I layout of buildings and hangars along the top of the photo; the World War II expansion of the facility into a flight training school in the center. Several World War I hangars remain along with the new hangars built as part of the Embry-Riddle Flight School in the center. The large, grassy flying field remains

Site information
- Type: Army Airfield
- Controlled by: Air Service, United States Army; United States Army Air Forces
- Condition: DeSoto Correctional Institution (open)

Location
- Coordinates: 27°12′26″N 81°40′12″W

Site history
- Built: 1917
- In use: 1917–1918; 1941–1944
- Battles/wars: World War I World War II

Garrison information
- Garrison: Training Section, Air Service (World War I); Army Air Force Training Command (World War I)

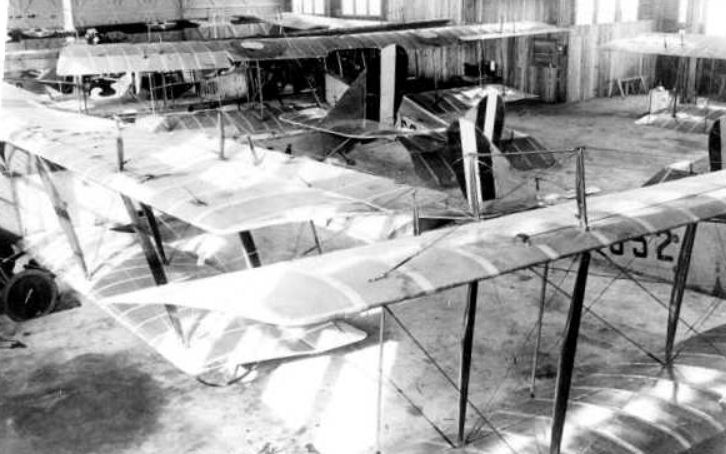
Curtiss JN-4 "Jennys" inside a hangar at Dorr Field, Florida, 1918.

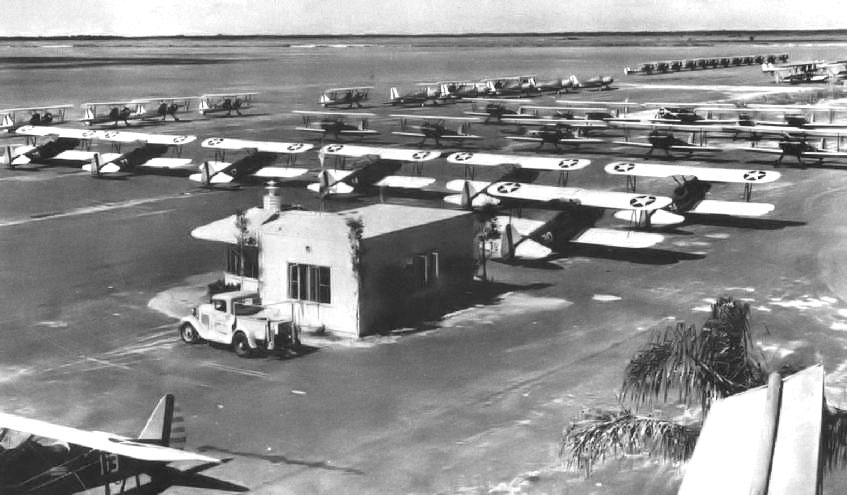
PT-17 Stearmans at Dorr Field, 1942

Dorr Field is a former military airfield, located 12 miles (19 km) east of Arcadia, Florida. The airfield was one of thirty-two Air Service training camps established in 1917 after the United States entry into World War I.

== History ==
Dorr Field was named after Flying Cadet Stephen H. Dorr, Jr., who was killed in a 17 August 1917 midair collision. Dorr enlisted in the summer of 1917 and was sent to Toronto, Ontario, Canada for training with the British Royal Flying Corps.

=== World War I ===
In 1917 the Army announced its intention of establishing a series of camps to train prospective pilots after the United States entry into World War I. An Army survey crew was sent to Southwest Florida looking for suitable sites to build airfields, one selected was a site about 13 miles to the southwest of Arcadia, Florida. An agreement to lease the land for the Army was concluded, and the construction of some 46 buildings began 15 March 1918. It covered over 700 acres which included fourteen hangars that housed four to eight planes each, a hospital, and six barracks that held 175 men each. Dozens of wooden buildings served as headquarters, maintenance, and officers’ quarters. Enlisted men had to bivouac in tents.

The field was opened in April 1918 and the first training squadron, the 76th Aero Squadron, which was transferred from nearly Carlstrom Field. A second squadron, the 109th Aero Squadron was also transferred from Carlstrom, and the first trainees began to arrive. Dorr Field initially acted as an overflow training field for Carlstrom, equipped with Curtiss JN-4 Jennies.

Dorr Field provided primary flight training for air cadets. In 1918, flight training occurred in two phases: primary and advanced. Primary training took eight weeks and consisted of pilots learning basic flight skills under dual and solo instruction with a student capacity of 300. After completion of their primary training at Mather, flight cadets were then transferred to another base for advanced training. In July 1918, an additional three training squadrons were assigned to Dorr Field, and additional JN-4s to be used for flight training were shipped in wooden crates by railcar. Training units assigned to Dorr Field:

- Post Headquarters, Dorr Field, April 1918 – December 1919
- 76th Aero Squadron (II), April 1918 (xfr from Carlstrom Field)

Re-designated as Squadron "A", July 1918 – November 1918

- 109th Aero Squadron (II), April 1919 (xfr from Carlstrom Field)

Re-designated as Squadron "B", July 1918 – November 1918

- 110th Aero Squadron (II) (Service), May, 1919

Re-designated as Squadron "C", July 1918 – November 1918

- 240th Aero Squadron (II), May, 1918

Re-designated as Squadron "D", July 1918 – November 1918

- 241st Aero Squadron (II), May, 1918

Re-designated as Squadron "E", July 1918 – November 1918

- Flying School Detachment (Consolidation of Squadrons A–E), November 1918 – November 1919

With the sudden end of World War I in November 1918, the future operational status of Dorr Field was unknown. Many local officials speculated that the U.S. government would keep the field open because of the outstanding combat record established by Dorr-trained pilots in Europe. Locals also pointed to the optimal weather conditions in the Southwest Florida area for flight training. Cadets in flight training on 11 November 1918 were allowed to complete their training, however no new cadets were assigned to the base. Also the separate training squadrons were consolidated into a single Flying School detachment, as many of the personnel assigned were being demobilized.

However, Dorr Field was ordered to phase down all activities at the base in accordance with sharply reduced military budgets. and flight training activities ceased in November, 1919. Thereafter the field was placed in a dormant state, and a small caretaker unit was assigned to the facility for administrative reasons.

=== World War II ===
In January 1920 primary pilot instruction resumed on a small scale at Carlstrom Field with the opening of the Air Service Pilots' School. Training in primary flying took place at both Carlstrom and Dorr Fields. However, the administrative difficulties of the Air Service training about 200 flying cadets concurrently at such widely separated locations in Texas, California and Florida prompted a decision in 1923 to centralize all flying training in San Antonio, Texas. The War Department ordered that Dorr Field be dismantled and all remaining structures be sold as surplus.

During the remainder 1920s and 1930s, the War Department leased out the vacant land to local farmers and ranchers. In the late 1930s, it was noted that "nothing remains but crumbling concrete roads, runways, and massive foundations, all but concealed by rank palmetto growth." However, with the sudden need for pilots as part of the buildup of the Army Air Corps in 1941, Dorr Field was reactivated on 4 October as one of at least 5 satellite airfields used to support flight training operations as a sub-base of Carlstrom Field. Assigned to the USAAF East Coast Training Center (later Central/Eastern Flying Training Command) as a primary (level 1) pilot training airfield. Operated by Embry-Riddle Corporation under 54th Flying Training Detachment primarily as a training airfield for Royal Air Force flying cadets.

Flying training was performed with Fairchild PT-19s as the primary trainer. Also had several PT-17 Stearmans and a few P-40 Warhawks assigned. Inactivated 16 October 1944 with the drawdown of AAFTC's pilot training program and was declared surplus and turned over to the Army Corps of Engineers. Eventually discharged to the War Assets Administration (WAA).

=== Civil use ===
Dorr Field was subsequently sold to DeSoto County for one dollar and was redeveloped as a State Prison. Today only some large concrete pads that were the floors of the World War II hangars remain, although a few small wartime buildings are still in use by the prison. It is not open to the general public.

== See also ==
- Florida World War II Army Airfields
- United States Army World War I Flight Training
- 29th Flying Training Wing (U.S. Army Air Forces)
