= Eberts Field =

Former US military airfield in Arkansas

- Lonoke, Arkansas
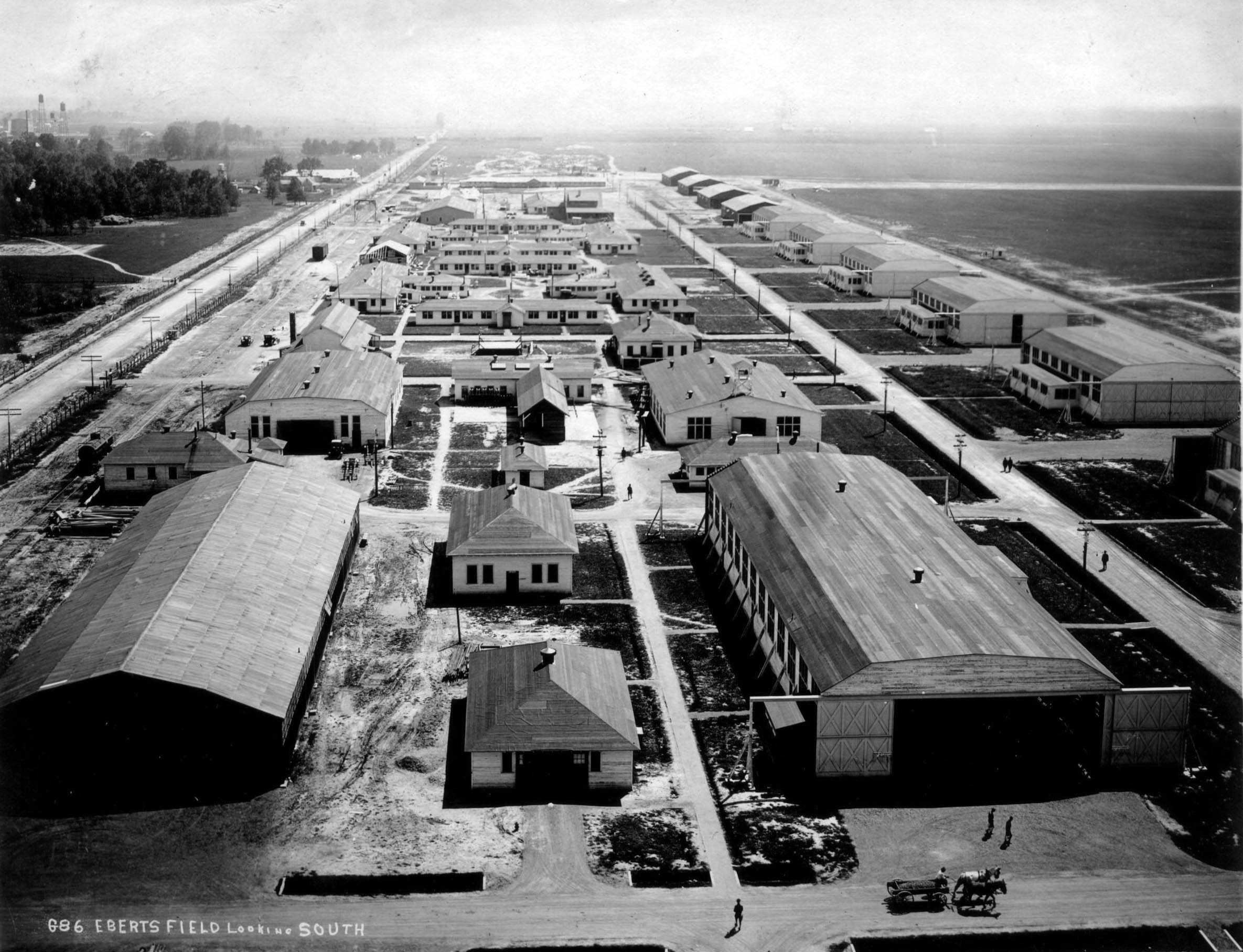
- Eberts Field Arkansas Station Area, c. 1918

Site information
- Type: Army Airfield
- Controlled by: Air Service, United States Army; United States Army Air Forces
- Condition: Aquaculture, rural housing, farming

Location
- Location within Arkansas
- Coordinates: 34°47′43″N 091°55′09″W

Site history
- Built: 1917
- In use: 1917–1945
- Battles/wars: World War I World War II – American Campaign

Garrison information
- Garrison: Training Section, Air Service (World War I); Army Air Force Training Command (World War I)

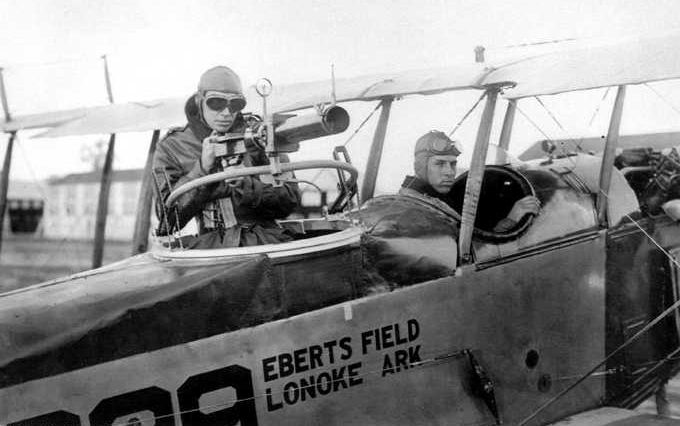
Gunnery training at Eberts Field, 1918

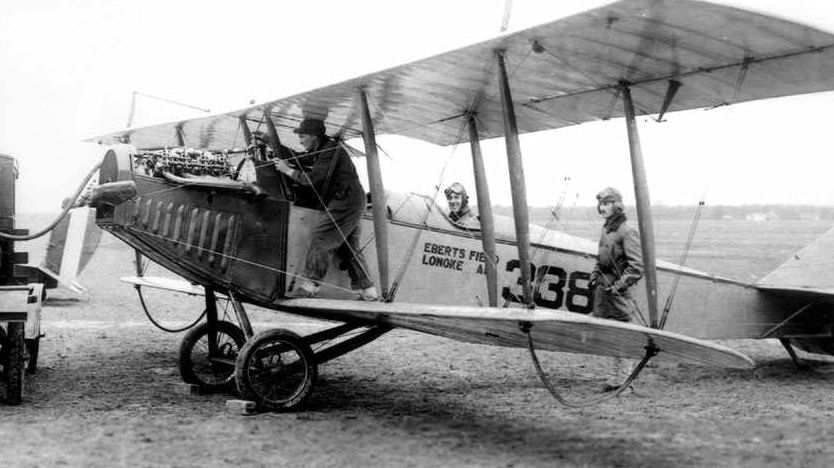
Refueling a Curtiss JN-4 "Jenny", 1918

Eberts Field is a former military airfield, located 1.4 miles (2.3 km) northwest of Lonoke, Arkansas. The airfield was one of thirty-two Air Service training camps established in 1917 after the United States entry into World War I.

It operated as a training field during World War I for the Air Service, United States Army between 1917 until 1919. The airfield was also used as a contract glider training airfield during World War II by the United States Army Air Forces, being closed in 1943.

Today the land is used in aquaculture.

== History ==
Eberts Field was named for Signal Corps Captain Melchior Eberts, a native Arkansan and a West Point Graduate. On 11 August 1916, he was attached to the Aviation Section of the Signal Corps and on 3 March 1917 received the rating of junior military aviation. He was ordered from his station at Rockwell Field, San Diego, California to Columbus Airfield, New Mexico on 3 May 1917. Lieutenant Eberts was killed while making an airplane exhibition flight.

=== World War I ===
In January 1918, the Department of War sent a cadre of officers to the Lonoke, Arkansas area to survey sites for an aviation school. The group decided on a location northwest of Lonoke, and an agreement to lease the land for the Army was concluded, and the construction of some 50 buildings began. It covered over 700 acres. Dozens of wooden buildings served as headquarters, maintenance, and officers’ quarters. Enlisted men had to bivouac in tents. Built as a flying training airfield, the airfield consisted of a row of about a dozen hangars, arranged north-south on the east side of the airfield. Landings and takeoffs were on an all-direction turf field, measuring about 5,200' x 2,460'.

Eberts Field opened in March 1918 as a World War I basic aviators school, approximately 2,500 enlisted men and officers were stationed there between 1918 and 1919. In 1918, flight training occurred in two phases: primary and advanced. Primary training took eight weeks and consisted of pilots learning basic flight skills under dual and solo instruction with a student capacity of 300. After completion of their primary training at Mather, flight cadets were then transferred to another base for advanced training.

Eberts Field ranked second among aviation training fields maintained by the U.S. government, and it was one of the leading training centers for aviators during the war. The first unit stationed there was the 181st Aero Squadron, which was transferred from Kelly Field, Texas. Only a few U.S. Army Air Service aircraft arrived with the 181st Aero Squadron, Most of the Curtiss JN-4 Jennys to be used for flight training were shipped in wooden crates by railcar. Eberts Field served as a base for flight training for the United States Army Air Service. In 1917, flight training occurred in two phases: primary and advanced. Primary training took eight weeks and consisted of pilots learning basic flight skills under dual and solo instruction with a student capacity of 300. After completion of their primary training at Eberts, flight cadets were then transferred to another base for advanced training.

Training units assigned to Eberts Field:

- Post Headquarters, Eberts Field, March 1918 – December 1919
- 66th Aero Squadron (II), May, 1918

Re-designated as Squadron "A", July–November 1918

- 123d Aero Squadron (II (Service), April, 1918

Re-designated as Squadron "B", July–November 1918

- 124th Aero Squadron (II), April, 1918

Re-designated as Squadron "C", July–November 1918

- 125th Aero Squadron (II), April, 1918

Re-designated as Squadron "D", July–November 1918

- 181st Aero Squadron, March, 1918

Re-designated as Squadron "E", July–November 1918

- Flying School Detachment (Consolidation of Squadrons A-E), November 1918 – November 1919

The Arkansas Gazette reported that it was not uncommon to see several hundred planes flying in formation over the field. Planes from training schools in adjoining states sometimes joined them. With the sudden end of World War I in November 1918, the future operational status of Eberts Field was unknown. Many local officials speculated that the U.S. government would keep the field open because of the outstanding combat record established by Eberts-trained pilots in Europe. Cadets in flight training on 11 November 1918 were allowed to complete their training, however no new cadets were assigned to the base. Also the separate training squadrons were consolidated into a single Flying School detachment, as many of the personnel assigned were being demobilized.

The first newspaper in Arkansas to be delivered by plane was the Arkansas Gazette. On June 18, 1919, Lieutenant C. E. Johnson of Eberts Field delivered 300 papers to Lonoke in his plane to demonstrate the possibilities of aviation. However, World War I ended before the first class of flight cadets graduated.

On November 21, 1919, an army flying team called the Flying Carnival visited Eberts Field for stunt flying exhibitions. A crowd of more than 3,000 viewed one exhibition from the banks of the Arkansas River at Little Rock (Pulaski County), where the fliers in their open-cockpit flying machines appeared out of the skies at 3,000 feet to swoop under the Main Street Bridge spanning the river. The next day, about 2,000 boarded trains from Little Rock to see the daring fliers perform at Eberts Field.

The airfield was closed at the end of November 1919, and a small caretaker unit was assigned to the facility for administrative reasons. The War Department had ordered the small caretaker force at Eberts Field to dismantle all remaining structures and to sell them as surplus. The last Army personnel departed by the end of the year. Between the wars, the airfield was used as Lonoke Municipal Airport.

=== World War II ===
Eberts Field was reopened by the United States Army Air Forces in 1942 as a contract glider training airfield. Training provided by Kenneth Starnes Flying Service. Used primarily C-47 Skytrains and Waco CG-4 unpowered Gliders. The mission of the school was to train glider pilot students in proficiency in operation of gliders in various types of towed and soaring flight, both day and night, and in servicing of gliders in the field.

Closed in 1943 and turned over to the Army Corps of Engineers. Eventually discharged to private ownership though the War Assets Administration (WAA).

=== Current uses ===
Today, most of the airfield is flooded, being used in aquaculture as a shrimp farm. A row of at least a dozen concrete hangar foundations still exist. During Arkansas's Sesquicentennial Celebration, the Lonoke County Arkansas Sesquicentennial Committee placed a marker with a brief history of where Eberts Field had been, located on the west side of Arkansas Highway 89, south of Interstate 40.

There was once a 20-foot mound of dirt at the northeast end of the field. This was once the target for many thousands of rounds of machine gun bullets. Here, the fledgling aviators learned some of the fundamentals of operating a machine gun while flying an airplane.

The lobby of Little Rock's Aerospace Education Center houses a Flying Jenny that was flown at Eberts Field in that period.

== See also ==
- United States Army World War I Flight Training
- 31st Flying Training Wing (World War II)
