= Gerstner Field =

- Lake Charles, Louisiana
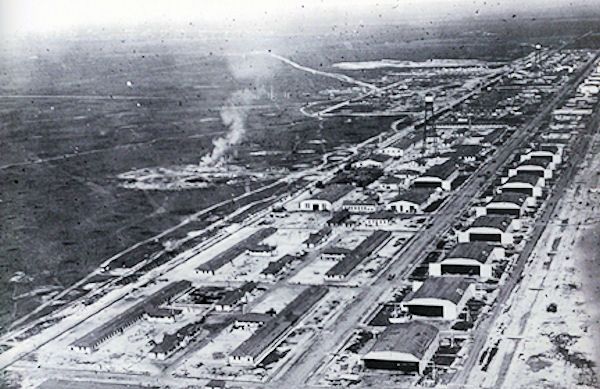
- Gerstner Field Louisiana, 1918, looking west to east along old camp road.

Site information
- Type: Pilot training airfield
- Controlled by: Air Service, United States Army
- Condition: Abandoned, agricultural area

Location
- Location within Louisiana
- Coordinates: 30°06′57″N 93°04′48″W

Site history
- Built: 1918
- In use: 1918–1919
- Battles/wars: World War I

Garrison information
- Garrison: Training Section, Air Service

Gerstner Field is a former World War I military airfield, located 11.1 miles (17.9 km) southeast of Lake Charles, Louisiana. It operated as a training field for the Air Service, United States Army between 1917 until 1919. The airfield was one of thirty-two Air Service training camps established in 1917 after the United States entry into World War I.

== History ==
Gerstner Field was named for Fredrick J. Gerstner, who drowned 31 December 1914 when his plane crashed into the Pacific Ocean near Oceanside, California, while participating in the annual Mackay Trophy contest.

=== World War I ===
Beginning in June 1917, Lake Charles had tried to acquire an army training camp, but the Army rejected the area as too flat for training foot soldiers. Nevertheless, local officials continued to lobby for a military facility in the area to support the war effort. In August 1917, they successfully convinced the Air Service to establish a flying training field. The airfield was located about eleven miles southeast of Lake Charles and consisted to two separate facilities. The base was quite large, containing twenty-four hangars, twelve barracks for enlisted men, twelve buildings to house officers, twelve mess halls, four large warehouses, and numerous workshops and offices. All buildings were painted green with white trimming.

The base was intended for 2,000 men, but reached a maximum of almost 3,000, requiring tents and improvised messes to accommodate them. The first troops arrived in November 1917, before construction was completed. Guards from a national guard unit in Mississippi were followed by airmen and equipment from Chandler Field in Essington, Pennsylvania, which was being closed.

The first unit stationed there was the 45th Aero Squadron, which was transferred from Essington. Some Curtiss JN-4 Jennys to be used for flight training were ferried into Gerstner from Kelly Field, south of San Antonio, Texas, however most of the planes to be used for flight training were shipped in wooden crates by railcar. Training units assigned to Gerstner Field:

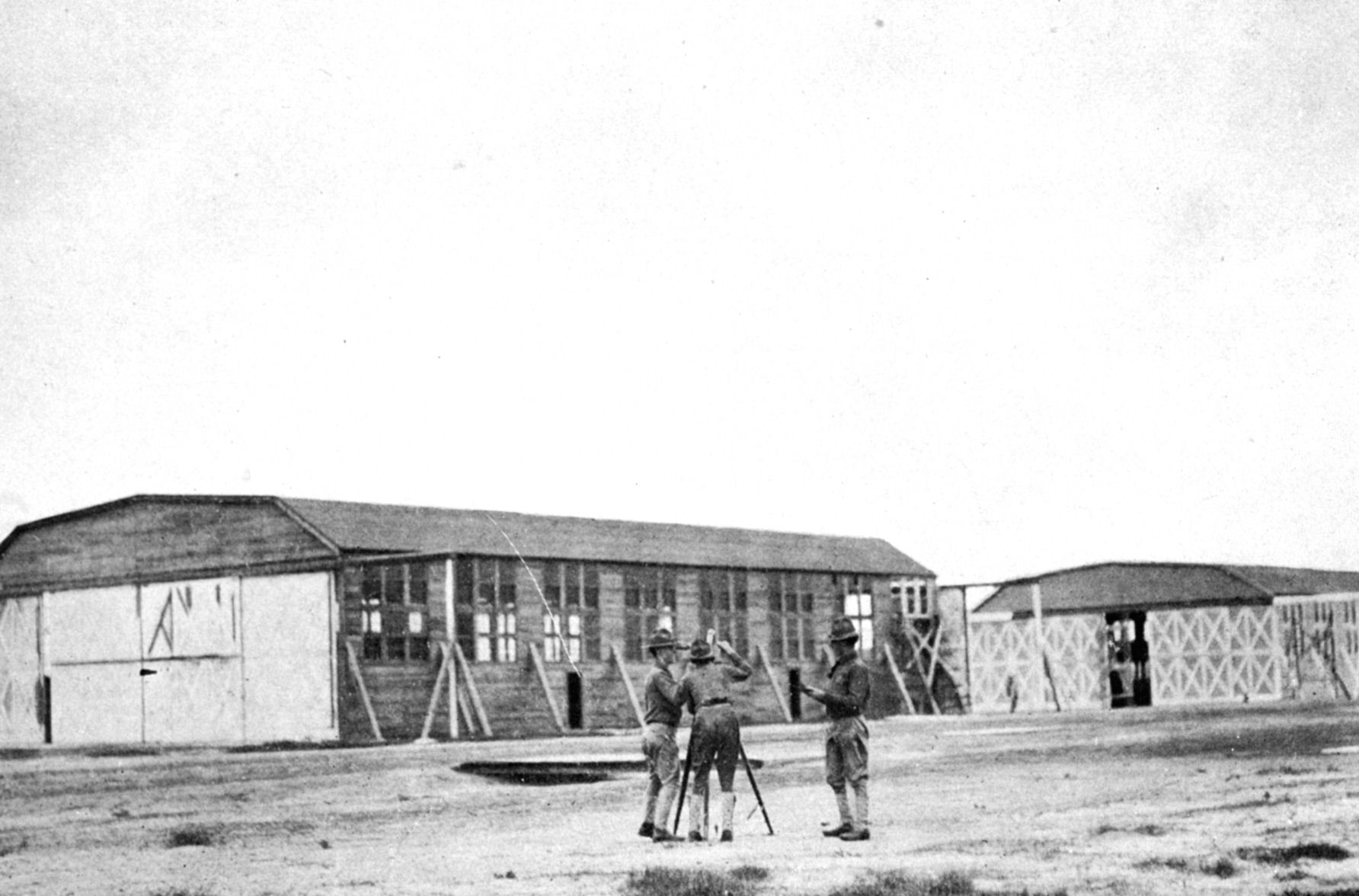
Making a reading at the end of the first minute of a pilot-balloon run at Gerstner Field, Louisiana.

- Post Headquarters, Gerstner Field - December 1919
- 45th Aero Squadron (II)**, November 1917

Re-designated as Squadron "A", July–November 1918

- 63d Aero Squadron (II), April 1918

Re-designated as Squadron "B", July–November 1918

- 64th Aero Squadron (II), April 1918

Re-designated as Squadron "C", July–November 1918

- 75th Aero Squadron (II), March 1918

Re-designated as Squadron "D", July–November 1918

- 143d Aero Squadron (Service), November, 1917 (Transferred from Chandler Field, Pennsylvania)

Re-designated as Squadron "E", July–November 1918

- 195th Aero Squadron, December 1917

Re-designated as Squadron "F", July–November 1918

- 196th Aero Squadron, December 1917

Re-designated as Squadron "G", July–November 1918

- Squadron "H", July–September 1918
- Flying School Detachment (Consolidation of Squadrons A-F), November 1918-November 1919

**Was formed as 2d Reserve Aero Squadron, July 1917 at Chandler Field, Pennsylvania. Re-Designated upon transfer to Gerstner Field in November, 1917.

Gerstner Field flight operations suffered tremendously from blowing sand that hampered flying and destroyed airplane engines. A chronic lack of spare engines and parts prevented many repairs, thus leaving men idle and, at one time, as many as two-thirds of the camp's airplanes out of commission. Sanitary conditions were probably never very good. The sewerage system was inadequate and drainage was poor. The field was somewhat lumpy, so good landing spots were hard to find, and a severe mosquito problem made life at the base frequently unbearable. Flying instruction was good, but the airplanes used to train pursuit pilots proved inadequate for truly valuable combat training. The school for training flight instructors worked impressively well. The bureaucracy had some problems, but the base was usually well-managed.

Gerstner Field suffered two incidents of massive destruction in its history. The first occurred on February 5, 1918, when a German submarine sunk the Tuscania, a British troopship, off the coast of Ireland. Among the dead were about twenty-seven men of the 158th Aero Squadron. They had trained at Gerstner Field and had left the base less than four weeks before. The second came from a hurricane that struck Southwest Louisiana on August 6, 1918. The storm killed three and injured eight at the field and destroyed ninety-six airplanes. The only building to survive at the Big Lake gunnery school was the mess hall, which was used as a temporary hospital.

=== Closure ===
With the sudden end of World War I in November 1918, the future operational status of Gerstner Field was unknown. Many local officials speculated that the U.S. government would keep the field open because of the outstanding combat record established by Gerstner-trained pilots in Europe. Cadets in flight training on 11 November 1918 were allowed to complete their training, however no new cadets were assigned to the base. Also the separate training squadrons were consolidated into a single Flying School detachment, as many of the personnel assigned were being demobilized. Finally, flight training activities ceased on November 8, 1919.

In December 1919 Gerstner Field was deactivated as an active duty airfield, and a small caretaker unit was assigned to the facility for administrative reasons. But by 1921, the decision had been made to phase down all activities at the base in accordance with sharply reduced military budgets. and it was closed. The War Department had ordered the small caretaker force at Gerstner Field to dismantle all remaining structures and to sell them as surplus, and Gerstner never was used again as a civil airport or a military airfield.

=== Current status ===
Today, little evidence of its existence remains. The station apparently straddled both the east and west sides of LA 27, with Old Camp Road being the northern boundary of the base. Woods and brush have taken over the west side. where at least a dozen aircraft hangars once stood. Outlines of walls and hangar foundations can be seen in aerial images, the airfield now being an agricultural field. A few isolated concrete foundations are all that remain of the station area to the east side of the road.

== See also ==
- List of Training Section Air Service airfields
