= Arcadia County Park =

Urban park in Arcadia, California

- Location within the Los Angeles metropolitan area
- Type: Urban park
- Location: Arcadia, California
- Coordinates: 34.1378244°N 118.0337007°W
- Area: 185 acres (75 ha)
- Opened: October 12, 1938
- Operator: County of Los Angeles Department of Parks and Recreation
- Status: Open all year

Arcadia County Park or Arcadia Community Regional Park (originally Santa Anita Recreational Park) is a park in Arcadia, California located along the intersection of Huntington Drive and Santa Anita Avenue. On its southern side is the Santa Anita Golf Course.

== Description ==
Arcadia County Park has two visitor parking lots. One is located in its eastern portion, stretching along Santa Anita Avenue. Another is located in its western portion, stretching along Huntington Drive.

The park's amenities include twelve tennis courts, a baseball field, two softball fields, children's playgrounds, fitness zones, group picnic shelters, outdoor kitchens, horseshoe pits, a senior center, and a community center. Additionally, the Norman Johnson Aquatic Center in the southern section of the park offers two swimming pools and a wading pool. The center is open for recreational swimming and hosts swim lessons for various ages. The southeast corner of the park features a clubhouse and four bowling greens used by the Santa Anita Lawn Bowling Club, previously known as the Arcadia Bowling Green Club. Construction of the clubhouse did not begin until 1947, when the county allocated $30,000 for the project.

Located at the center of the park is a bronze statue of a soldier wielding a rifle. Known as "The Hiker", it is one of 52 other identical statues created by Theo Alice Ruggles Kitson scattered around the United States between 1921 and 1956. The statue stands at roughly six feet tall atop a five-foot concrete and granite base. It was installed on April 20, 1941, and was dedicated to veterans of the Spanish–American War, as well as those who served during the Philippine–American War and China Relief Expedition. The Hiker originally sat in the park's southwest corner, but was moved to its current location on June 21, 1993.

There is another art installation in the northeast corner of the park that was commissioned by the Arcadia Rotary Club in 1962. Known as "Memorial Fountain", or simply "Peacock Fountain", it is a fountain entirely covered by mosaic tiles. Created by James Fickes, it stands at approximately 5.5 feet tall and has a diameter of 24 feet. The bronze peafowl sculpture that can be seen atop the stone pedestal in the fountain's center was installed in 2002 and adds an additional five feet to its height. It was sculpted by David Chapple. Although Memorial Fountain was originally intended as a war memorial, it was later dedicated to the victims of the September 11 attacks.

== Santa Anita Golf Course ==
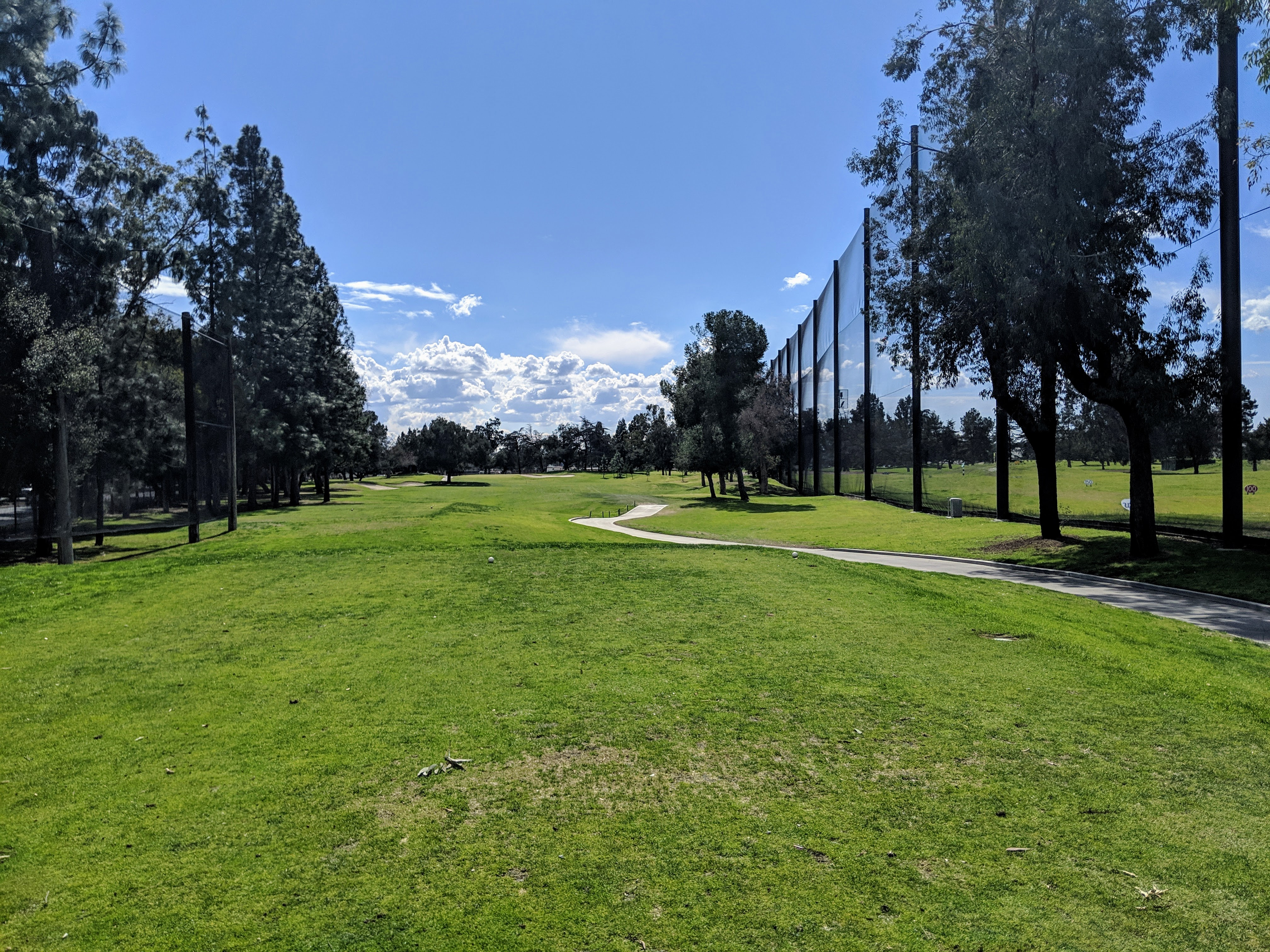
View from the first tee 2022

The Santa Anita Golf Course was operated by Santa Anita Associates for the Los Angeles County Department of Parks and Recreation from 1986-2016. This golf course was historically considered to be a part of the Arcadia County Park. However, the course is operated by Strato Partners for the Los Angeles County Department of Parks and Recreation since 2016.

The 185 acres (0.75 km^{2}) upon which the golf course was built has always been devoted to recreation in some form or another. The original architect was James Harrison Smith.

=== Course record ===
The current Par 71 record is held by Blake Moore of Monrovia, California who shot a 9 under par 62 on Sunday, July 20, 2003. "The Open" era par 70 record is held by Ellsworth Vines who shot an opening round 62 on October 16, 1953 during the Santa Anita Open.

== History ==
Originally part of the "Lucky" Baldwin Ranch, Santa Anita's history dates back to the days when its broad oaks sheltered places where Indians camped. Across its broad acres traveled Mission Fathers from San Gabriel on their way up Little Santa Anita Canyon for lumber needed to build the Mission. From 1907 through 1909 horse racing was a feature on Lucky Baldwin's famed track. The clubhouse turn was right where No. 16 is now and when you're on the hill on the backside of No. 14, that's the turn where the horses turned for home.

=== World War I Years ===
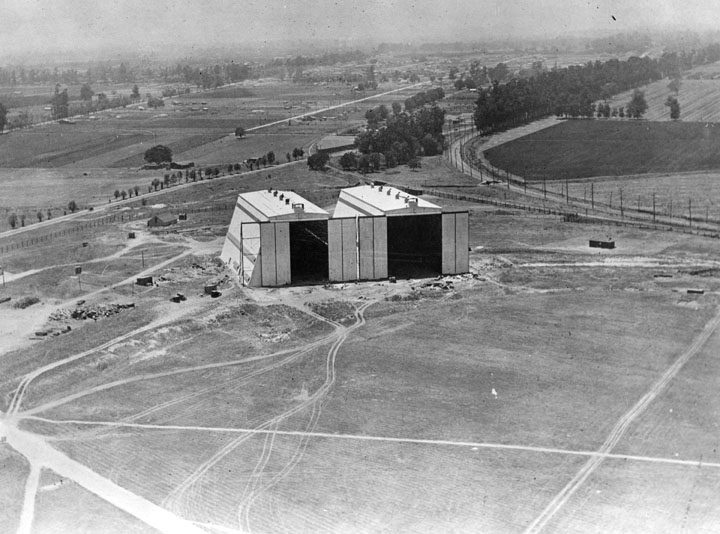
Hangars from the U.S. Army's Ross Field Balloon School, 1922. The site of the hangars is now the 4th hole on the Santa Anita Golf Course

During World War I, Ross Field, Named after Lt. Cleo J. Ross of the U.S. Army Air Service, housed a United States Army balloon school. Ross was an observer with the 8th Balloon Company and was killed in action in France on September 26, 1918, the only U.S. Army balloonist to die in combat. After the war ended in 1918, the roughly 3,500 soldiers of the balloon training school began to vacate Ross Field. The balloon school closed in the spring on 1919.

Anita Baldwin sold the land to the County of Los Angeles for $92,000 in 1918. A sand green golf course appeared following the closure of the school and Arcadia citizens took it over and operated it as a highly successful club.

=== Depression Era ===
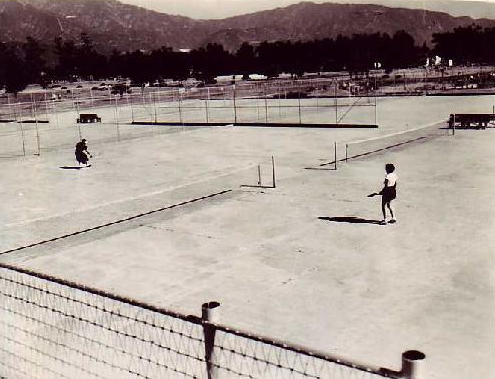
Two people playing a game of tennis at the park in the late 1930s

In 1935, through an act of Congress, the United States Department of War deeded 185 acres to Los Angeles County with the provision that it be used as a park and recreation center. This was mostly made possible by the efforts of then-Congressman John H. Hoeppel of California's 12th district. After being approved by President Roosevelt, groundbreaking for the park began on February 10, 1936, and the park was dedicated on July 4, 1938. It officially opened for public use on October 12, 1938, with most of the construction being completed by the Works Progress Administration (WPA). The project employed over 600 men and cost around $1,000,000. The redevelopment of Ross Field was a Works Progress Administration project that included not just the golf course but a swimming pool, tennis courts, two baseball fields, a children's playground, and a lawn bowling complex. The recreational area in which these amenities were built is now part of Arcadia County Park.

The name of the park was eventually changed from the "Santa Anita Recreational Park" to "Arcadia County Park" due to confusion with the nearby Santa Anita Park. Over the years, numerous minor projects were completed on the park, including $50,000 appropriated in 1950 for general improvements. On May 26, 2016, the city of Arcadia unveiled a monument near the northeast corner of the park in honor of the 14 local servicemen killed in the Vietnam War.

=== The Course Opens ===
The Santa Anita Golf course opened in two stages. Nine holes were opened on April 24, 1938 and the complete 18 opened on October 12, 1938.

1938 also saw the birth of the Santa Anita Open—held each year until 1955, in the middle of October, to celebrate the opening of the Golf Course and to start the official Winter Golf Tournament season in Southern California. Prize money that first year was $1,000. Frank Moninger personally underwrote the first two tournaments. The Santa Anita Golf Club with the help of a few individual golfers underwrote the next few events. The County donated the Golf Course for the Santa Anita Open. The Course Record established in the days of "The Open" is 62 - held by Ellsworth Vines. Lloyd Mangrum won the first and second Opens with 274 (-6) and 278 (-2).

=== The Course Changes ===
In the 1960s the 9th hole was altered to make way for the construction of a baseball field at Arcadia County Park. The original tee box was re-positioned to the South West of its original location and the hole was lengthened. The original dog leg left configuration and chute of trees has been lost and the hole now plays due east and relatively straight. With the back right tee box location rarely used, the hole remained a par 4 until 1989 when the back tee box was put into common use and the hole was recategorized as a par 5, thus changing par at the course to 71. Additionally significant changes were made to the short 281 yard par 4 17th hole where the large expanse of sand on the left side (south) was replaced with grass. The hole retains its name from the time (Desert) but has lost much character and altered the strategic challenge of its original configuration. Other changes from the era include the removal of several bunkers on the Par 5 Third hole and the sandy waste area between the 10th and 18th holes.

As part of the change in management in 1986 commitments were made to increase secondary facilities (clubhouse and dining) as well as substantive changes to the course itself during 1990-1991. The first hole and the driving range were swapped for safety reasons as errant shots from the range threatened cars on Santa Anita Avenue. The original dog leg left 1st hole was shortened from 409 yards to the current 367 yards. The 18th Green was moved forward to make way for clubhouse construction but the total yardage remained the same as the tee box was lengthened.

During the 2000-2010 period small modifications were made to return a single bunker to the right of the 3rd hole (where the original design had three) and a large bunker in the center of the fairway of that same hole. Tee boxes on the 4th, 7th and 17th holes were modified. The detached tee boxes on 7th and 17th are seldom if ever used in open play though are occasionally used in tournament play.

In 2016, the course management was once again changed to the local private equity firm Strato Partners who operates it on behalf of Los Angeles County. Strato Partners is also known for their affiliation with Los Amigos Golf Course and County Golf Course.

== See also ==
- The Shops at Santa Anita
- Los Angeles County Arboretum and Botanic Garden
