= Emerson Field (Fort Jackson) =

Former WWI military airfield in Fort Jackson, South Carolina, US

Coordinates: 33.977°N 80.962°W

Emerson Field is a former World War I military airfield, located at Fort Jackson, South Carolina. It operated as a training field for the Air Service, United States Army from 1918, and was established in connection with the field artillery brigade firing center at Camp Jackson. The airfield was one of thirty-two Air Service training camps established starting in 1917 after the United States entry into World War I.

== History ==
Camp Jackson was established in 1917. The flying field was constructed from 18 July 1918, and was soon named for 2d. Lt. William K. B. Emerson, (9 April 1894 - 14 May 1918) of the Allied Expeditionary Force, 12th Aero Squadron, American Field Artillery, who was killed in action at Bonconville, France. A New York City native, Emerson was a 1916 undergraduate of Harvard University and went overseas in the American Ambulance Service.
