= Taylor Field (Alabama) =

Taylor Field Gunter Auxiliary Airfield #5
- Montgomery, Alabama
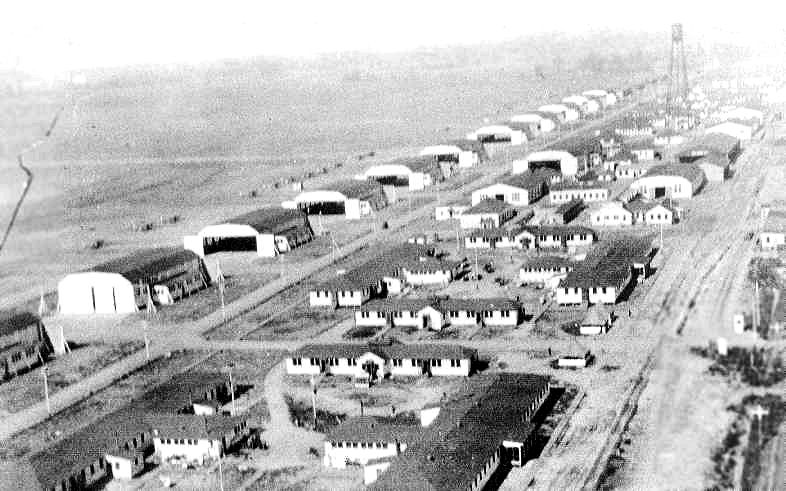
- A 1918 aerial view looking northwest along the 16 hangars at Taylor Field

Site information
- Type: Pilot training airfield
- Controlled by: Air Service, United States Army; United States Army Air Forces
- Condition: Agricultural area

Location
- Coordinates: 32°18′14″N 086°07′19″W

Site history
- Built: 1917
- In use: 1917–1946
- Battles/wars: World War I World War II

Garrison information
- Garrison: Training Section, Air Service (World War I); Army Air Force Training Command (World War I)

Taylor Field is a closed military airfield located 11 miles east-southeast of Montgomery, Alabama. It was one of thirty-two Air Service training camps established after the United States' entry into World War I in April 1917.

== History ==
=== World War I ===
The property leased by the War Department consisted of 800 acres of land for which the government paid $4,000 a year as rent, with an option of purchase for $32,000. The land was leased 16 November 1917. It was the first military flying facility in Alabama. The base was named Taylor Field, named after Captain Ralph L. Taylor of Stamford, Connecticut, who was commissioned a captain in the Nebraska National Guard Air Service on 3 May 1917, and ordered to active duty at Mineola Field (later Roosevelt Field), New York, on 23 May 1917. Captain Taylor was an aviation instructor at Mineola field, and was killed in an accident on 2 August 1917.

Four service squadrons: 128, 129, 131 and 193, arrived at the field by April 16, 1918. In addition, there was the usual complement of quartermaster and sanitary and medical detachments. The Air Service used Taylor Field as a primary flight school with an eight-week course. The maximum capacity was 300 students. It had sixteen hangars, repair shops, warehouses, barracks, a hospital and nearly 200 Curtiss JN-4 "Jenny" and De Havilland DH-4 "Gypsy Month" trainers. Aircraft assigned to the field were serviced by the Aviation Repair Depot of Montgomery, Alabama.

Active flying began on 2 May 1918. Major E. M. Hoffman, Signal Corps was the first officer in charge of the Flying Field. He was succeeded by 2nd Lt. Charles N. Monteith, July 9, 1918, who on October 2, 1918, was succeeded by 2nd Lt. Kenneth G. Fraser. The Field graduated 139 cadets. The total number of flying time was 20,619 hours, and 27 minutes.

Training units assigned to Taylor Field were:

- Post Headquarters, Taylor Field - October 1919
- 128th Aero Squadron, April 1918

Re-designated as Squadron "A", July–November 1918

- 131st Aero Squadron, March 1918

Re-designated as Squadron "B", July–November 1918

- 193d Aero Squadron, March 1918

Re-designated as Squadron "C", July–November 1918

- 129th Aero Squadron, April 1918

Re-designated as Squadron "D", July–November 1918

- Flying School Detachment (Consolidation of Squadrons A-D), November 1918-November 1919

The flying school trained 139 pilots in eight-week courses. Some deployed and fought in combat on the Western Front in France during World War I.

The airfield closed in April 1919.

=== World War II ===
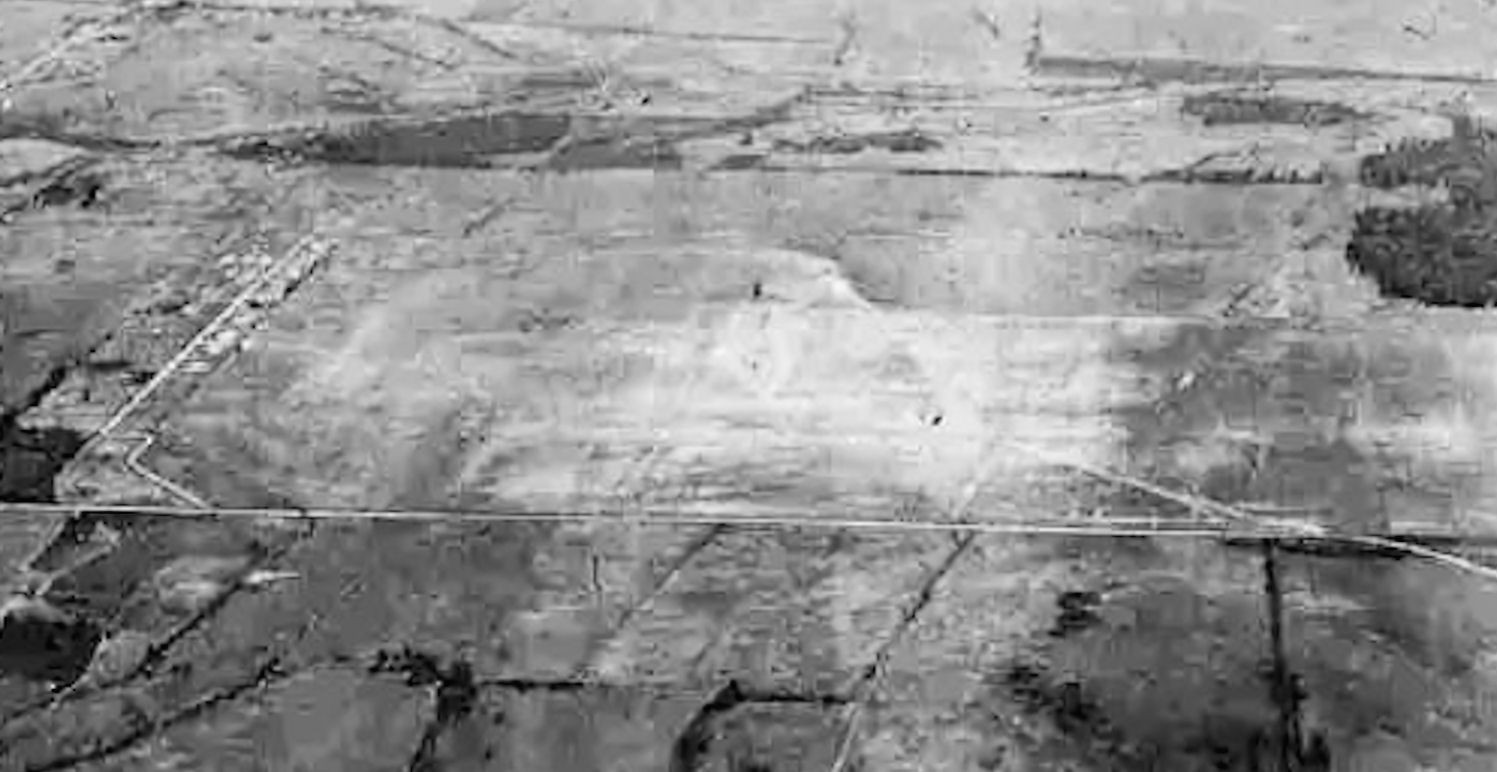
Taylor Field in 1945. Note some of the World War I facilities remaining for use as an auxiliary of Gunter AAF.

It was reopened as Gunter Auxiliary Airfield #5 during World War II and was used as an auxiliary landing field for the flight school at Gunter Army Airfield. After the war, it was closed in July 1946.

=== Post-World War II ===
After World War II, the airfield was sold off to private owners, and the remaining structures were dismantled. All the former hangars and structures of the military airfield have been torn down, though the remnants of a swimming pool remain are seen in aerial photos. There is an Alabama historical marker located on the south side of Ray Thorington Road across from Foxchase Drive. A subdivision named Avalon was developed in 2005 along the northwest border of the airfield's former location about 200 yards east of this marker, crossing over the former SW-to-NE runway. A dirt road to the east of Avalon runs along the same path as the former main entrance to the hangars, and a few homes were built along the east side of it in the 1950s. Lancelot Drive in Avalon crosses over the old main airfield road near where the dirt road terminates.

== See also ==
- Alabama World War II Army Airfields
- List of Training Section Air Service airfields
