= Benbrook Field =

Benbrook Field Carruthers Field Camp Taliaferro Field #3
- Benbrook, Texas
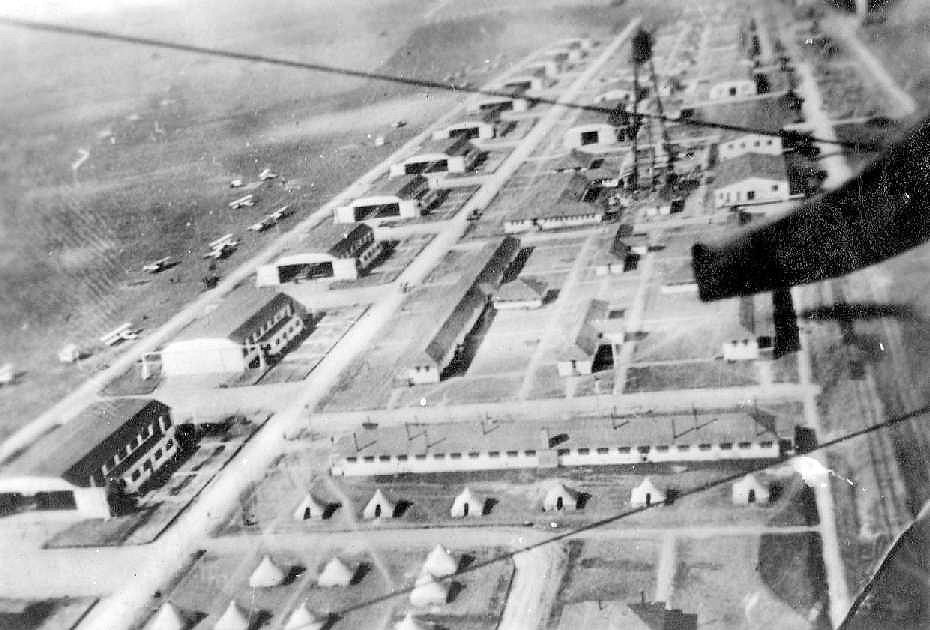
- Benbrook Field, Texas, 1918

Site information
- Type: Pilot training airfield
- Controlled by: Royal Flying Corps (1917); Air Service, United States Army (1918-1919)
- Condition: Redeveloped into urban area

Location
- Coordinates: 32°40′41″N 97°27′36″W

Site history
- Built: 1917
- In use: 1917–1919
- Battles/wars: World War I

Garrison information
- Garrison: Training Section, Air Service

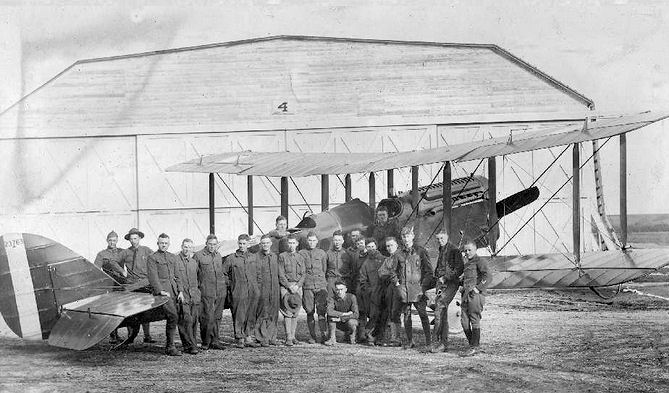
Flying cadets pose in front of a Curtiss JN-4 "Jenny" at Benbrook Field

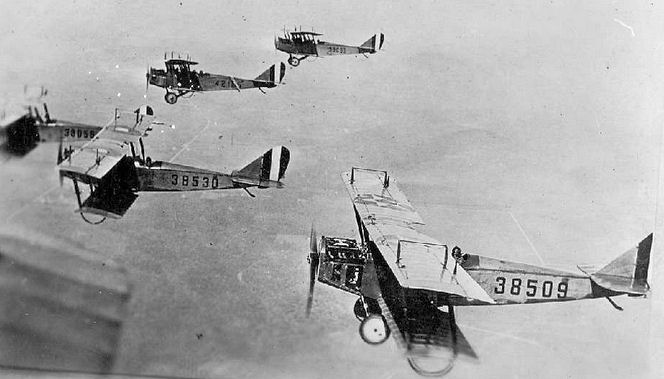
Formation of Curtiss JN-4s from Benbrook Field

Benbrook Field (Camp Taliaferro Field #3) is a former World War I military airfield, located 0.5 miles (0.80 km) North of Benbrook, Texas. It operated as a training field for the Air Service, United States Army between 1917 until 1919. It was one of thirty-two Air Service training camps established after the United States entry into World War I in April 1917.

After the United States' entry into World War I in April 1917, General John J. "Blackjack" Pershing invited the British Royal Flying Corps to establish training fields in Texas for the training of American and Canadian volunteers because of its mild weather. After looking at sites in Dallas, Fort Worth, Waco, Austin, Wichita Falls and Midland, three sites were established in 1917 in the Fort Worth vicinity (known as the "Flying Triangle."), those being Hicks Field (#1), Barron Field (#2), and Benbrook Field (#3).

Canadians named the training complex Camp Taliaferro after Walter Taliaferro, a US aviator who had been killed in an accident. Camp Taliaferro was headquartered under the direction of the Air Service, United States Army, which had an administration center near what is now the Will Rogers Memorial Center in Fort Worth, Texas.

== History ==
Taliafero Field No. 3 was used by the Royal Flying Corps from October 1917 to April 1918 as a training field for American and Canadian pilots. It was then turned over to the Air Service, United States Army. The Americans renamed the field Carruthers Field after Cadet W. K. Carruthers, who was killed at Hazelhurst Field, New York, when he was struck by a revolving propeller on 18 June 1917. At some point after July 1918 it was renamed Benbrook Field by the United States Army.

=== World War I ===
The Benbrook Field station area was located south of Mercedes Street in Benbrook. It occupied the area west of Winscott Road, being bordered on the west by Walnut Creek. A railroad spur connected with the Texas & Pacific Railway line across Walnut Creek. Most of the 34 buildings and hangars were located in an area generally bounded by Mercedes Street on the north, Winscott Road on the east, Cozby North Street on the south, and Walnut Creek on the west.

Benbrook was used as an aerial gunnery school for American and Canadian students. One particular English 'dancing in the sky'C.W.Hunt. aviator, Captain Vernon Castle, was already world-renowned as the famed dance team of Vernon and Irene Castle. Regrettably, he was killed in a plane crash at Benbrook Field during training exercises. Some witnesses believed that he deliberately crashed in order to avoid hitting another plane, and saved their lives. His burial was witnessed by thousands of mourners, who sadly watched the flagged draped casket pass in downtown Fort Worth. Even today, there is a street in Benbrook named in his honor.

Training units assigned to Benbrook Field:

- Post Headquarters, Benbrook Field April 1918-April 1919
- 208th Aero Squadron (II), April–July 1918

Re-designated as Squadron "A", July–November 1918

- 209th Aero Squadron (II), April–July 1918

Re-designated as Squadron "B", July–November 1918

- 229th Aero Squadron (II), April–July 1918

Re-designated as Squadron "C", July–November 1918

- 274th Aero Squadron, April–July 1918

Re-designated as Squadron "D", July–November 1918

- 379th Aero Squadron, April–July 1918

Re-designated as Squadron "E", July–November 1918

- Flying School Detachment (Consolidation of Squadrons A-E), November 1918-April 1919

Benbrook Field was closed at the end of April, 1919 and the buildings dismantled. Following the closure, the land was purchased by William Monnig and was used as a dairy. Today, the entire area has been redeveloped into what is now the Benbrook Lakeside subdivision. Intermixed within the houses are small, broken, isolated concrete slabs, the remainders of wartime buildings and hangars. The last remaining building was an ammunition warehouse west of U.S. 377 that was demolished in 2004 to facilitate future commercial development. Today a Texas historical marker for the airfield is located north of Mercedes Street, across the street from the Church at Benbrook as a memorial to the fliers of Benbrook Field.

== See also ==
- List of Training Section Air Service airfields
