= Camp John Wise =

Former U.S. Army military garrison in Texas

Coordinates: 29°25′26″N 98°29′36″W

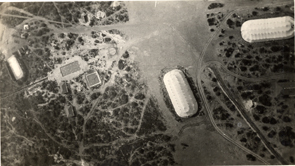
Balloon beds from the air over Camp John Wise circa 1918.

Camp John Wise is a former United States Army military garrison, located in San Antonio, Texas. During World War I it was used as a training field for the U. S. Army Balloon Corps between 1917 until 1919.

The airfield was one of thirty-two Air Service training camps established in 1918 after the United States entry into World War I. It named for John Wise of Philadelphia, a pioneer balloonist who constructed a balloon in which he set a world distance record in 1869.

== History ==
Camp John Wise was a temporary World War I aviation facility, named in honor of John Wise, an early American aeronaut, who constructed a balloon which he set a world distance record in 1869. The facility was located on 261 acres of leased land four miles north of downtown San Antonio. The personnel were quartered at Fort Sam Houston until March, when construction on their barracks was completed.

It was the home of the Army Balloon School, which was established on 19 January 1918. The Balloon School was transferred there from Fort Omaha, Nebraska. It included a school for enlisted specialists to be assigned to balloon companies; the organization of overseas and depot companies, and a course in balloon maneuvering for officers of balloon companies. It had a student capacity of 1,550.

The base reached a maximum strength of thirty-three officers and 1,800 enlisted men and was equipped with four balloons. The base was closed in 1919.

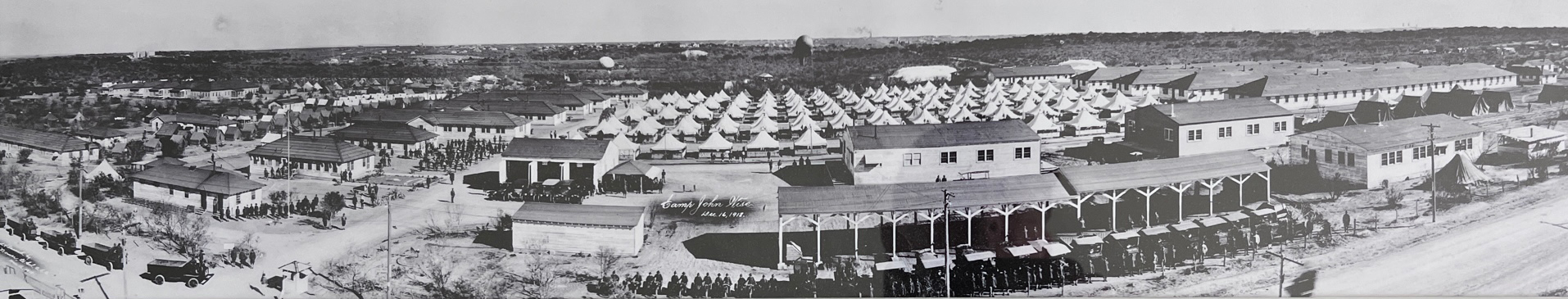

=== Current status ===
John Wise's grave is at Fort Sam Houston in the quadrangle parking lot.

=== See also ===
- List of Training Section Air Service airfields
