= Chandler Field (Pennsylvania) =

Former military airfield in Pennsylvania, US

- Essington, Pennsylvania
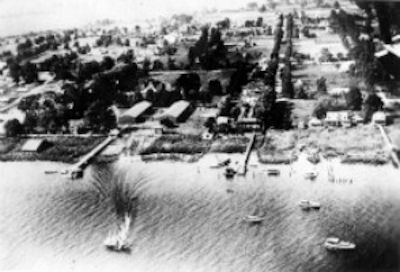
- Chandler Field, Pennsylvania, 1917

Site information
- Type: Pilot training airfield
- Controlled by: Air Service, United States Army
- Condition: Commercial airport

Location
- Coordinates: 39°51′38″N 75°18′00″W

Site history
- Built: 1917
- In use: 1917–1918
- Battles/wars: World War I

Garrison information
- Garrison: Training Section, Air Service

Chandler Field is a former military airfield located south of the central business district of Essington, a community in Tinicum Township, Delaware County, Pennsylvania, United States. It is situated on the Delaware River, west of Philadelphia International Airport.

== History ==
The base was initially named Chandler Field, being named after 1st Lieutenant Rex Chandler, a student, was killed in the crash on 8 April 1913 on a training flight from North Island, San Diego, California, in Curtiss F floatplane, Signal Corps 15, with Lewis H. Brereton as pilot. Lt Chandler was knocked unconscious in the crash and drowned.

=== World War I ===
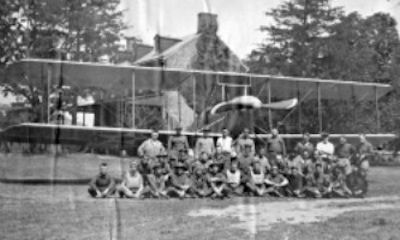
1917 Air service graduating class from Chandler Field

The facility was opened as a training field in early 1917 and initially operated as an Aviation Section, U.S. Signal Corps military airfield. The field was one of the first three Signal Corps military training airfields prior to the United States Entry into World War I.

Chandler Field was used to prepare National Guard seaplane aviators. Training units assigned to Chandler Field were:

- Post Headquarters, Chandler Field June 1917 – January 1918
- 2d Reserve Aero Squadron, July 1917

Re-designated as 45th Aero Squadron (II), August – November 1917

- 143d Aero Squadron (Service), October – November 1917

It was closed in early 1918 as inadequate for the Army's needs, its personnel and equipment moved to Gerstner Field, Louisiana.

=== Later use ===
The facility was reopened in 1919 as a flying school, and used by the Navy during World War II as a seaplane base. It was again reopened as a civil facility in 1946.

Today, the Chandler Field main building, officer's quarters, hangar foundations, launching ramp and other elements of the base remain. The buildings are closed to the public, however site tours are available.

== See also ==
- List of Training Section Air Service airfields
