= List of United States Air Force fighter squadrons =

This is a list of United States Air Force fighter squadrons. It covers units considered to be part of the Combat Air Force (CAF) such as fighter squadrons and serves as a break out of the comprehensive List of United States Air Force squadrons. Units in this list are assigned to nearly every Major Command in the United States Air Force.

== Fighter Squadrons ==
=== Squadrons 1 to 100 ===
Squadron	Shield	Location	Aircraft	Nickname	Note
1st Fighter Squadron		Tyndall AFB	F-15C	"Fightin' Furies" / "Griffins"	Inactivated 2006
2d Fighter Squadron		Tyndall AFB	F-15C	"American Beagle Squadron"	Redesignated 2d Fighter Training Squadron
3d Fighter Squadron		Clark AB	F-4E	Peugeots	Redesignated 3d Flying Training Squadron
4th Fighter Squadron		Hill AFB	F-35A	"Fightin' Fuujins"	
5th Fighter Interceptor Squadron		Minot AFB	F-15A	"Spittin' Kittens"	Redesignated 5th Flying Training Squadron
6th Night Fighter Squadron		Yokota Field	P-61	"Gators"	Redesignated 6th Weapons Squadron
7th Fighter Squadron		Holloman AFB	F-22A	"Bunyips"	Inactivated 2014 / Redesignated 7th Fighter Training Squadron
8th Fighter Squadron		Holloman AFB	F-16С	"Black Sheep"	
9th Fighter Squadron		Holloman AFB	F-117A	"Flying Knights"	Inactivated 2008 / Redesignated 9th Attack Squadron (ATKS)
10th Fighter Squadron		RAF Bentwaters	A-10A		Redesignated 10th Flight Test Squadron
11th Fighter-Interceptor Squadron		Duluth International Airport	F-106		Inactivated 1968
12th Fighter Squadron		Elmendorf AFB	F-15C	"Dirty Dozen"	Inactivated 2008
13th Fighter Squadron		Misawa AB	F-16C	"Panthers"	
14th Fighter Squadron		Misawa AB	F-16C	"Fightin' Samurai"	
15th Fighter-Interceptor Squadron		Davis–Monthan AFB	F-101		Inactivated 1964
16th Tactical Fighter Squadron		Shaw AFB	F-16		Redesignated 16th Weapons Squadron (2003)
17th Fighter Squadron		Shaw AFB	F-16		Redesignated 17th Weapons Squadron (2003)
18th Fighter Interceptor Squadron		Eielson AFB	F-16		
19th Fighter Squadron		Hickam AFB	F-22A	"Fighting Gamecocks"	
20th Fighter Squadron		Holloman AFB	F-4F	"Silver Lobos"	Inactivated
21st Fighter Squadron		Luke AFB	F-16C	"Gamblers"	
22d Fighter Squadron		Spangdahlem AB	F-16C	"Stingers"	Inactivated 2010
23d Fighter Squadron		Spangdahlem AB	F-16C		Inactivated 2010
24th Fighter Squadron		NAS JRB Fort Worth	F-16	"Leaping Tigers"	
25th Fighter Squadron		Osan AB	A-10C	"Assam Draggins"	
26th Fighter-Interceptor Squadron		Clark AB	F-86D		Inactivated 1959
27th Fighter Squadron		Langley AFB	F-22A	"Fightin' Eagles"	Oldest active Fighter Squadron in the US Air Force
28th Fighter-Interceptor Squadron					Redesignated 28th Test and Evaluation Squadron
29th Fighter-Interceptor Squadron					Inactivated 1968 / Redesignated 29th Training Systems Squadron
30th Fighter Squadron		Howard AFB	P-47		Inactivated 1953
31st Fighter Squadron		Elmendorf AFB	F-102		Re-designated 31st Tactical Reconnaissance Training Squadron
32d Fighter Squadron		Soesterberg AB	F-15C	"Wolfhounds"	Inactivated 1994
33d Fighter Squadron					Redesignated 33d Special Operations Squadron (2009)
34th Fighter Squadron		Hill AFB	F-35A	"Rude Rams"	
35th Fighter Squadron		Kunsan AB	F-16C	"Panton"	
36th Fighter Squadron		Osan AB	F-16C	"Flying Fiend"	
37th Fighter Squadron					Redesignated 37th Flying Training Squadron
38th Fighter Squadron					Redesignated 38th Reconnaissance Squadron
39th Fighter Squadron					Redesignated 39th Flying Training Squadron
40th Tactical Fighter Squadron			F-102	"Fighting Fortieth"	Inactivated on 30 April 1982 – Redesignated 40th Flight Test Squadron
41st Fighter Squadron		Anderson AFB	F-86D		Redesignated 41st Flying Training Squadron
42d Fighter Squadron		Pittsburgh Airport	F-86D		Redesignated 42d Flying Training Squadron
43d Fighter Squadron		Tyndall AFB	F-22A	"American Hornets"	
44th Fighter Squadron		Kadena AB	F-15C	"Vampires"	
45th Fighter Squadron		Davis–Monthan AFB	A-10C	"Hoosier Hogs"	
46th Fighter Training Squadron		Barksdale AFB	A-10A		Inactivated on 1 October 1993
47th Fighter Squadron		Davis–Monthan AFB	A-10C	"Dogpatchers"	
48th Fighter Squadron		Langley AFB	F-15A		Redesignated 48th Flying Training Squadron
49th Fighter Squadron		Griffiss AFB	F-106		Redesignated 49th Flying Training Squadron
50th Fighter Squadron (All Weather)		Offutt AFB	AT-6		Redesignated 50th Flying Training Squadron
50th Fighter-Bomber Squadron		NAS New Orleans	F-84		Inactivated 1957, never manned
51st Fighter Squadron		Howard Field	P-38		Inactivated 1946
52d Fighter Squadron		Luke AFB	F-35A	"Warhawks"	
53d Fighter Squadron		Joint Base Andrews	F-16C	"NATO Tigers"	
54th Fighter Squadron		Elmendorf AFB	F-15C	"Leopards"	Inactivated on 28 April 2000
55th Fighter Squadron		Shaw AFB	F-16C	"Fighting Fifty-Fifth"	
56th Fighter-Interceptor Squadron		Wright-Patterson AFB	F-104A/B		Inactivated 1960
57th Fighter Squadron		Ebbing ANGB	F-35A	"Black Knights"	
58th Fighter Squadron		Eglin AFB	F-35A	"Gorillas"	
59th Fighter Squadron		Eglin AFB	F-15C	"Golden Pride"	Redesignated 59th Test and Evaluation Squadron (2004)
60th Fighter Squadron		Eglin AFB	F-35A	"Fighting Crows"	
61st Fighter Squadron		Luke AFB	F-35A	"Top Dogs"	
62d Fighter Squadron		Luke AFB	F-35A	"Spikes"	
63d Fighter Squadron		Luke AFB	F-35A	"Panthers"	
64th Fighter-Interceptor Squadron		Clark AB		"Scorpions"	64th Aggressor Squadron
65th Fighter Squadron		Nellis AFB	F-35A	"Panthers"	65th Aggressor Squadron
66th Fighter Squadron		Nellis AFB	A-10C		66th Weapons Squadron
67th Fighter Squadron		Kadena AB	F-15C	"Fighting Cocks"	
68th Fighter Squadron		Moody AFB	F-16C	"Lightning Lancers"	Inactivated on 30 April 2001
69th Fighter Squadron		Luke AFB	F-16C	"Werewolves"	Reactivated in the Air Force Reserve (AFRC) in 2010 / 944th Fighter Wing
70th Fighter Squadron		Moody AFB	F-16C	"White Knights"	Inactivated 2000
71st Fighter Squadron		Langley AFB	F-22A	"Iron Men"	
72d Fighter Squadron		MacDill AFB	F-16C	"Falcons / Pax Per Auxila Parata"	Inactivated 1992
73d Fighter Squadron		Hamilton AFB			Redesignated 73d Strategic Reconnaissance Squadron (Heavy) 1952
74th Fighter Squadron		Moody AFB	A-10C	"Flying Tigers"	
75th Fighter Squadron		Moody AFB	A-10C	"Tiger Sharks"	
76th Fighter Squadron		Moody AFB	A-10C	"Vanguards"	
77th Fighter Squadron		Shaw AFB	F-16C	"Gamblers"	
78th Fighter Squadron		Shaw AFB	F-16C	"Bushmasters"	Redesignated 78th Reconnaissance Squadron (2007)
79th Fighter Squadron		Shaw AFB	F-16C	"Tigers"	
80th Fighter Squadron		Kunsan AB	F-16C	"Headhunter" / "Juvats"	
81st Fighter Squadron		Moody AFB	A-29B	"Panthers"	
82d Fighter-Interceptor Squadron		Naha Air Base, Okinawa	F-101		
83d Fighter-Interceptor Squadron		Loring AFB	F-106		
84th Fighter-Interceptor Squadron		Castle AFB	F-106		Inactivated on 27 February 1987
85th Fighter-Interceptor Squadron		Scott AFB			Redesignated 85th Test and Evaluation Squadron
86th Fighter-Interceptor Squadron		Youngstown Municipal Airport	F-102		Inactivated on 1 March 1960
87th Fighter-Bomber Squadron		General Mitchell Field	F-86		Inactivated on 16 November 1957
87th Fighter-Interceptor Squadron		K.I. Sawyer AFB	F-106		Inactivated on 1 October 1985
88th Fighter-Bomber Squadron		General Mitchell Field	F-86		Inactivated on 16 November 1957
88th Fighter Squadron, Single Engine		Camp Kilmer	P-40		Inactivated on 3 November 1945
89th Fighter Squadron		Wright-Patterson AFB	F-16		Redesignated 89th Airlift Squadron on 1 October 1994
89th Fighter Squadron, Single Engine		Camp Kilmer	P-40		Inactivated on 3 November 1945
90th Fighter Squadron		Elmendorf AFB	F-22A	"Pair-O-Dice"	
91st Tactical Fighter Squadron		RAF Bentwaters	A-10A		
92d Tactical Fighter Squadron		RAF Bentwaters	A-10A	"Skulls"	
93d Fighter Squadron		Homestead ARB	F-16C	"Makos"	
94th Fighter Squadron		Langley AFB	F-22A	"Hat-in-the-ring Gang"	
95th Fighter Squadron		Tyndall AFB	F-35A	"Boneheads"	
96th Fighter-Interceptor Squadron		New Castle AFB	F-94B	"Jackrabbits"	
97th Fighter-Interceptor Squadron		New Castle AFB	F-94C	""	
98th Fighter-Interceptor Squadron		Suffolk County AFB	F-101B		Inactivated
99th Fighter Squadron				"Tuskegee Airmen"	Redesignated 99th Flying Training Squadron
100th Fighter Squadron		Dannelly Field	F-35A		

=== Squadrons 101 to 300 ===
Squadron	Shield	Location	Aircraft	Nickname	Note
101st Fighter Squadron		Massachusetts ANG	F-15C		Redesignated 101st Intelligence Squadron (2008)
103d Fighter Squadron		Pennsylvania ANG	A-10	"Black Hogs"	
104th Fighter Squadron		Maryland ANG	A-10C	"Fighting Orioles"	
107th Fighter Squadron		Michigan ANG	A-10	"Red Devils"	
110th Fighter Squadron		Missouri ANG	F-15C	"Lindbergh's Own"	Redesignated 110th Bomb Squadron (2009)
112th Fighter Squadron		Ohio ANG	F-16C/D	"Stingers"	
114th Fighter Squadron		Kingsley Field Oregon ANG	F-15C	"The Land of No Slack"	
119th Fighter Squadron		New Jersey ANG	F-16C	"Jersey Devils"	Oldest active fighter squadron in the Air National Guard.
120th Fighter Squadron		Colorado ANG	F-16C	"Colorado Cougars" and "Mile High Militia"	
121st Fighter Squadron		District of Columbia ANG	F-16C/D	"Capital Guardians"	
122d Fighter Squadron		Louisiana ANG	F-15C/D	"Bayou Militia"	
123d Fighter Squadron		Portland IAP Oregon ANG	F-15C/EX	"Redhawks"	
124th Fighter Squadron		Iowa ANG	F-16C/D	"Hawkeyes"	
125th Fighter Squadron		Oklahoma ANG	F-16C	"Tulsa Vipers"	
131st Fighter Squadron		Massachusetts ANG	F-15C	"Barnestormers"	
134th Fighter Squadron		Vermont ANG	F-35A	"Green Mountain Boys"	
144th Fighter Squadron		California ANG	F-15C		
148th Fighter Squadron		Arizona ANG	F-16A	"Kickin' Ass"	
149th Fighter Squadron		Virginia ANG	F-22	"Gentlemen from Richmond"	Formerly 328th Fighter Squadron
152d Fighter Squadron		Arizona ANG	F-16	"Tigers"	
157th Fighter Squadron		South Carolina ANG	F-16C	"Swamp Foxes"	
159th Fighter Squadron		Florida ANG	F-35A	"Boxin' Gators"	
160th Fighter Squadron		Alabama ANG	F-16C/D	"Snakes"	Inactive 2007
162d Fighter Squadron		Ohio ANG		"Sabres"	
163rd Fighter Squadron		Indiana ANG	A-10C	"Blacksnakes"	
170th Fighter Squadron		Illinois ANG	F-16C/D	"Fly'N Illini"	
174th Fighter Squadron		Iowa ANG		"Bats"	
175th Fighter Squadron		South Dakota ANG	F-16C/D	"Lobos"	
176th Fighter Squadron		Wisconsin ANG	F-35A	"Badgers"	
179th Fighter Squadron		Minnesota ANG	F-16C	"Bulldogs"	
182d Fighter Squadron		Texas ANG	F-16C/D	"Lone Star Gunfighters"	
184th Fighter Squadron		Arkansas ANG	A-10	"Flying Razorbacks"	
186th Fighter Squadron		Montana ANG	F-15C	"Big Sky"	
188th Fighter Squadron		New Mexico ANG	F-16C/D	"Tacos"	
194th Fighter Squadron		California ANG	F-15C	"Griffins"	
195th Fighter Squadron		Arizona ANG	F-16C	"War Hawks"	
199th Fighter Squadron		Hawaii ANG	F-22	"Mai Tai's"	

=== Squadrons 301 to 400 ===
Squadron	Shield	Location	Aircraft	Nickname	Note
301st Fighter Squadron		Tyndall AFB	F-22	"Red Tail Angels"	44th Fighter Group (AFRC)
302d Fighter Squadron		Elmendorf AFB	F-22	"Sun Devils"	477th Fighter Group (AFRC)
303d Fighter Squadron		Whiteman AFB	A-10	"KC Hawgs"	
304th Fighter Squadron		Pinellas Army Airfield	P-40 Warhawk		Inactivated 1944; redesignated as the 169th Fighter Squadron
305th Fighter Squadron		Dale Mabry Field	P-47		Inactivated 1944; redesignated as the 170th Fighter Squadron
306th Fighter Squadron		Dale Mabry Field	P-47		Inactivated 1944; redesignated as the 176th Fighter Squadron
306th Fighter Squadron		Atlantic City ANGB	F-16C/D	"The Gunners"	
307th Fighter Squadron		Seymour Johnson AFB	F-15E	"Stingers"	
308th Fighter Squadron		Luke AFB	F-35A	"Emerald Knights"	
309th Fighter Squadron		Luke AFB	F-16C	"Wild Ducks"	
310th Fighter Squadron		Luke AFB	F-35A	"Top Hats"	
311th Fighter Squadron		Holloman AFB	F-16C	"Sidewinders	
312th Fighter Squadron		Luke AFB	F-35A	"Scorpions"	
313th Tactical Fighter Squadron		Hahn AB	F-16C	"Lucky Puppies"	Inactivated 1991
314th Fighter Squadron		Holloman AFB	F-16C	"Warhawks"	
315th Fighter Squadron		Burlington International Airport	F-16C		Active Associate Unit
316th Fighter Squadron		McEntire JNGB	F-16C		Active Associate Unit
317th Fighter Interceptor Squadron		Eielson AFB	F-102, F-106		Inactivated 1969
318th Fighter Interceptor Squadron		McChord AFB	F-15		Inactivated 1989
319th Fighter Interceptor Training Squadron		Tyndall AFB	F-104		Inactivated 1977
320th Fighter Squadron		Mitchel Field	P-47		Inactivated 1944
321st Fighter-Interceptor Squadron		Paine Field	F-89J		Inactivated 1960
322d Fighter-Interceptor Squadron		Kingsley Field	F-101		Inactivated 1968
323d Fighter-Interceptor Squadron			F-102		Inactivated 1960
324th Fighter-Interceptor Squadron			F-86L		Inactivated 1960
325th Fighter-Interceptor Squadron		Traux Field	F-102		Inactivated 1966
326th Fighter-Interceptor Squadron		Richards-Gebaur Air Force Base	F-102		Inactivated 1967
327th Fighter-Interceptor Squadron		Thule AB	F-102		Inactivated 1960
328th Fighter Squadron		RAF Bodney	P-51		Inactivated 1945
329th Fighter-Interceptor Squadron		George AFB	F-106		Inactivated 1967
330th Fighter-Interceptor Squadron		Stewart AFB	F-86		Inactivated 1959
331st Fighter-Interceptor Squadron		Webb AFB	F-104		Inactivated 1967
332d Fighter-Interceptor Squadron		Thule AB	F-102		Inactivated 1965
333d Fighter Squadron		Naha Airfield, Japan	P-38		Inactivated on 10 May 1946 - redesignated the 131st Fighter Squadron
333d Fighter Squadron		Seymour Johnson AFB	F-15E	"Lancers"	Not related to 333 FS from World War II
334th Fighter Squadron		Seymour Johnson AFB	F-15E	"Fighting Eagles"	
335th Fighter Squadron		Seymour Johnson AFB	F-15E	"Chiefs"	World's Leading MiG Killers
336th Fighter Squadron		Seymour Johnson AFB	F-15E	"Rocketeers"	
337th Tactical Fighter Squadron		Seymour Johnson AFB	F-4E		Consolidated with 2874th Test Squadron (1991)
338th Fighter Squadron		AAF Station Giebelstadt, Germany	P-51		Inactivated on 20 August 1946
339th Tactical Fighter Squadron		Moody AFB	F-4E		Inactivated on 1 July 1983
340th Fighter Squadron		Itami Airfield, Japan	P-51		Inactivated on 10 May 1946 - Consolidated with the 340th Air Refueling Squadron, 1985
341st Fighter Squadron		Itami Airfield, Japan	P-51		Inactivated on 10 May 1946 - redesignated the 141st Fighter Squadron
342d Fighter Squadron		Itami Airfield, Japan	P-51		Inactivated on 10 May 1946 - redesignated the 142d Fighter Squadron
343d Fighter Squadron		AAF Station Giebelstadt, Germany	P-51		Inactivated on 20 August 1946
344th Fighter Squadron		Shemya Army Airfield, Alaska	P-38		Inactivated on 15 August 1946
345th Fighter Squadron		Seymour Johnson Field	P-47		Inactivated on 7 November 1945
346th Fighter Squadron		Seymour Johnson Field	P-47		Inactivated on 7 November 1945 - redesignated the 147th Fighter Squadron
347th Fighter Squadron		Seymour Johnson Field	P-47		Inactivated on 7 November 1945
348th Night Fighter Squadron		Salinas Army Air Base	P-61		Disbanded on 31 March 1944
349th Night Fighter Squadron		Hammer Field	P-61		Inactivated on 31 March 1944.
350th Fighter Squadron		RAF Raydon	P-51K		Inactivated on 18 October 1945 - redesignated as the 157th Fighter Squadron
351st Fighter Squadron		RAF Raydon	P-51K		Inactivated on 18 October 1945 - redesignated as the 158th Fighter Squadron
352d Fighter Squadron		RAF Raydon	P-51K		Inactivated on 18 October 1945 - redesignated as the 159th Fighter Squadron
352d Tactical Fighter Squadron		Phan Rang Air Base	F-100		Inactivated 31 July 1971
353d Fighter Squadron		Myrtle Beach AFB	A-10A	"Bulldogs"	Inactivated on 15 December 1992
354th Fighter Squadron		Davis–Monthan AFB	A-10C	"Bulldogs"	Inactivated September 2024
355th Fighter Squadron		NAS Fort Worth	F-16C		
356th Tactical Fighter Squadron					Inactivated
357th Fighter Squadron		Davis–Monthan AFB	A-10C	"Dragons"	
358th Fighter Squadron		Whiteman AFB	A-10C	"Lobos"	Active Associate Unit
359th Fighter Squadron		RAF Martlesham Heath	P-51K		Inactivated on 11 Nov 1945 - redesignated as the 155th Fighter Squadron
360th Fighter Squadron		RAF Martlesham Heath	P-51K		Inactivated on 11 Nov 1945 - redesignated as the 156th Fighter Squadron
361st Fighter Squadron		RAF Martlesham Heath	P-51K		Inactivated on 11 November 1945 - Consolidated with the 461st Tactical Fighter Training Squadron
362d Fighter Squadron		AAF Station Neubiberg	P-51K		Inactivated on 20 August 1946 - redesignated as the 162d Fighter Squadron
363d Fighter Squadron		AAF Station Neubiberg	P-51K		Inactivated on 20 August 1946 - redesignated as the 164th Fighter Squadron
364th Fighter Squadron		AAF Station Neubiberg	P-51K		Inactivated on 20 August 1946 - redesignated as the 166th Fighter Squadron
365th Fighter Squadron		La Junta Army Air Field	P-47N		Inactivated on 7 November 1945 - Redesignated 163rd Fighter Squadron
366th Fighter Squadron		La Junta Army Air Field	P-47N		Inactivated on 7 November 1945
367th Fighter Squadron		Homestead Air Reserve Base	F-16C		Active Associate Unit
368th Fighter Squadron		RAF East Wretham	P-51D		Inactivated on 10 November 1945 - Redesignated 165th Fighter Squadron
369th Fighter Squadron		RAF East Wretham	P-51D		Inactivated on 10 November 1945 - Redesignated 167th Fighter Squadron
370th Fighter Squadron		RAF East Wretham	P-51D		Inactivated on 10 November 1945
371st Fighter Squadron, Two Engine		Santa Maria Army Air Field	P-38		Disbanded on 31 March 1944
372d Fighter Squadron, Two Engine		Santa Maria Army Air Field	P-38		Disbanded on 31 March 1944; Consolidated with 352d Tactical Fighter Squadron, 1985
373d Fighter Squadron, Two Engine		Santa Maria Army Air Field	P-38		Disbanded on 31 March 1944
374th Fighter Squadron		RAF Little Walden	P-51		Inactivated on 24 October 1945 - redesignated as the 171st Fighter Squadron
375th Fighter Squadron		RAF Little Walden	P-51		Inactivated on 24 October 1945 - redesignated as the 172d Fighter Squadron
376th Fighter Squadron		RAF Little Walden	P-51		Inactivated on 24 October 1945
377th Fighter Squadron		Dannelly Field	F-35A		Active Associate Unit
378th Fighter Squadron		Truax Field ANGB	F-35A		Active Associate Unit
379th Fighter Squadron		Biggs Field	P-51H		Inactivated on 1 August 1946
380th Fighter Squadron		RAF Keevil	P-51		Redesignated 160th Tactical Reconnaissance Squadron
381st Fighter Squadron		Maupertu Airfield	P-51		Redesignated 161st Tactical Reconnaissance Squadron
382d Fighter Squadron		Maupertu Airfield	P-51		Redesignated 162d Tactical Reconnaissance Squadron
383d Fighter Squadron		Buckley Space Force Base	F-16C		Active Associate Unit
384th Fighter Squadron		Duluth International Airport	F-16C		Active Associate Unit
385th Fighter Squadron			P-51		Inactivated 1945
386th Tactical Fighter Squadron		Clovis AFB	F-100		Inactivated 1959 – Not related to 386 FS from World War II
386th Fighter Squadron			P-47		Redesignated 174th Fighter Squadron
387th Fighter Squadron			P-47		Redesignated 175th Fighter Squadron
388th Tactical Fighter Training Squadron		Mountain Home AFB	EA-6B		Inactivated 2010
389th Fighter Squadron		Mountain Home AFB	F-15E	"Thunderbolts"	
390th Fighter Squadron		Mountain Home AFB	F-15C	"Wild Boars"	Inactivated 2010
391st Fighter Squadron		Mountain Home AFB	F-15E	"Bold Tigers"	
392d Fighter Squadron		Seymour Johnson Field	P-47		Inactivated on 7 November 1945 - Redesignated 178th Fighter Squadron
393d Fighter Squadron		Seymour Johnson Field	P-51		Inactivated on 7 November 1945 - Redesignated 179th Fighter Squadron
394th Fighter Squadron				P-47N	Inactivated 1945
395th Fighter Squadron		AAF Station Straubing	P-47		Inactivated on 20 August 1946 - Redesignated 181st Fighter Squadron
396th Fighter Squadron		AAF Station Straubing	P-47		Inactivated on 20 August 1946 - Redesignated 182d Fighter Squadron
397th Fighter Squadron		AAF Station Straubing	P-47		Inactivated on 20 August 1946
398th Fighter-Interceptor Squadron		Hamilton AFB	F-104		Inactivated on 8 February 1957.
399th Fighter Squadron		Will Rogers Field	P-40		Redesignated 57th Reconnaissance Squadron, Weather on 7 July 1945
400th Fighter Squadron		Will Rogers Field	P-40		Redesignated 58th Reconnaissance Squadron, Weather on 7 July 1945

=== Squadrons 401 to 500 ===
Squadron	Shield	Location	Aircraft	Nickname	Note
401st Fighter Squadron		AAF Station Fritzlar	P-51		Inactivated on 10 November 1945 - Redesignated 173d Fighter Squadron
402d Fighter Squadron		AAF Station Fritzlar	P-51		Inactivated on 10 November 1945 - Redesignated 187th Fighter Squadron
404th Fighter Squadron		Strasbourg/Entzheim Airport	P-47		Inactivated on 10 November 1945 - Redesignated 186th Fighter Squadron
405th Fighter Squadron		Strasbourg/Entzheim Airport	P-47		Inactivated on 10 November 1945 - Redesignated 190th Fighter Squadron
406th Fighter Squadron		Strasbourg/Entzheim Airport	P-47		Inactivated on 10 November 1945 - Consolidated on 19 September 1985 with the 506th Air Refueling Squadron
407th Fighter Squadron		Alexandria Army Air Base	P-51		Inactivated on 7 November 1945 - Redesignated 191st Fighter Squadron
408th Fighter Squadron		Alexandria Army Air Base	P-51		Inactivated on 7 November 1945 - Redesignated 192d Fighter Squadron
409th Fighter Squadron		Alexandria Army Air Base	P-51		Inactivated on 7 November 1945 - Redesignated 194th Fighter Squadron
410th Fighter Squadron		Mitchel Field	P-47		Inactivated on 7 November 1945 - Reactivated 24 May 1946 and Redesignated 195th Fighter Squadron, 146th Fighter Group, 146th Fighter Wing
411th Fighter Squadron		Mitchel Field	P-47		Inactivated on 7 November 1945 - Reactivated 24 May 1946 and Redesignated 196th Fighter Squadron, 146th Fighter Group, 146th Fighter Wing
412th Fighter Squadron		Mitchel Field	P-47		Inactivated on 7 November 1945 - Reactivated 24 May 1946 and Redesignated 197th Fighter Squadron, 146th Fighter Group, 146th Fighter Wing
413th Fighter-Interceptor Squadron		Travis AFB	F-86D		Inactivated 1955
414th Night Fighter Squadron		Rio Hato Airfield	P-61		Inactivated 1947 - Redesignated 414th Combat Training Squadron
415th Fighter Squadron		Holloman AFB	F-117	"Nightstalkers"	Inactivated 1993 - Redesignated 415th Special Operations Squadron
416th Fighter Squadron		Holloman AFB	F-117	"Ghost Riders"	Inactivated 1993
417th Fighter Squadron		Holloman AFB	F-117		Inactivated 1993 - Redesignated 417th Weapons Squadron
418th Tactical Fighter Training Squadron		McConnell AFB	F-105		Inactivated 1976
419th Tactical Fighter Training Squadron		McConnell AFB	F-105		Inactivated 1971
420th Night Fighter Squadron		Hammer Field	P-61		Inactivated 1944
421st Fighter Squadron		Hill AFB	F-35A	"Black Widows"	
422d Night Fighter Squadron			P-61	"Green Bats"	Redesignated 422d Test and Evaluation Squadron (196?)
423d Night Fighter Squadron		RAF Chalgrove	P-61		Redesignated 155th Photographic Reconnaissance Squadron on 22 June 1944
424th Night Fighter Squadron		Hammer Field	P-61		Inactivated 1944
425th Fighter Squadron		Luke AFB	F-16C	"Black Widows"	Activated 1992 / Republic of Singapore (RSAF)
426th Tactical Fighter Training Squadron		Luke AFB	F-15A		Inactivated 1990
427th Night Fighter Squadron			P-61		Inactivated 1945
428th Fighter Squadron		Mountain Home AFB	F-15SG	"Buccaneers"	Activated 2009 / Republic of Singapore (RSAF)
429th Fighter Squadron		Cannon AFB	EF-111	"Black Falcons"	Inactivated 19 June 1998
430th Fighter Squadron		Cannon AFB	EF-111		Inactivated 29 June 1993
431st Tactical Fighter Training Squadron		George AFB	F-4E		Inactivated on 1 October 1978
432d Fighter-Interceptor Squadron		Minneapolis–Saint Paul International Airport	F-89H		Inactivated on 2 January 1958
433d Fighter Squadron		Holloman AFB	AT-38		Inactivated on 8 July 1992
434th Fighter Training Squadron		Laughlin AFB	T-38C		
435th Fighter Training Squadron		Randolph AFB	T-38C		
436th Tactical Fighter Training Squadron		Holloman AFB	AT-38		Inactivated on 2 August 1991
437th Fighter-Interceptor Squadron		Seymour Johnson AFB	F-106		Inactivated on 30 September 1968
438th Fighter-Interceptor Squadron		Griffis AFB	F-106		Inactivated on 30 September 1968
440th Fighter-Interceptor Squadron		Erding Air Base	F-86D		Inactivated on 1 January 1960
441st Fighter Squadron		Perry Army Air Field	P-47		Disbanded on 1 May 1944
442d Tactical Fighter Training Squadron		Nellis AFB	F-111A		Inactivated on 31 July 1977
443d Fighter Squadron		Norfolk Army Airfield	P-47		Disbanded on 10 April 1944
444th Fighter-Interceptor Squadron		Charleston AFB	F-101B		Inactivated on 30 September 1968
445th Fighter-Interceptor Squadron		Wurtsmith AFB	F-101B		Inactivated on 30 September 1968
446th Fighter Squadron		Santa Maria Army Air Field	P-38		Disbanded on 31 March 1944
447th Fighter Squadron		Thomasville Army Air Field	P-39		Disbanded on 1 May 1944
448th Fighter-Day Squadron		Seymour Johnson AFB	F-100		Inactivated on 8 December 1957
449th Fighter-Interceptor Squadron		Ladd AFB	F-89J		Inactivated on 25 August 1960
450th Fighter Squadron		Camp Springs Army Air Field	P-47		Disbanded on 10 April 1944
450th Fighter-Day Squadron		Foster AFB	F-100		Inactivated on 18 November 1957
451st Fighter Squadron		Ephrata Army Air Base	P-39		Disbanded on 31 March 1944
451st Fighter-Day Squadron		Foster AFB	F-100		Inactivated on 18 November 1957
452d Fighter Squadron		Bradley Field	P-47		Disbanded on 10 April 1944
452d Fighter-Day Squadron		Foster AFB	F-100		Inactivated on 18 November 1957
453d Fighter-Bomber Squadron		Bunker Hill AFB	F-100		Inactivated on 1 September 1957
455th Fighter-Bomber Squadron					
457th Fighter Squadron		NAS JRB Ft Worth	F-16C	"Spads"	
461st Fighter Squadron			F-15E	"Deadly Jesters"	Inactivated
466th Fighter Squadron		Hill AFB	F-35A	"Diamondbacks"	
467th Strategic Fighter Squadron		Turner AFB	F-84		Inactivated on 11 May 1956
468th Strategic Fighter Squadron		Turner AFB	F-84		Inactivated on 11 May 1956
469th Tactical Fighter Squadron		Korat Royal Thai Air Force Base	F-4		Inactivated in 1972
470th Tactical Fighter Squadron		Tinker AFB	F-100		Inactivated on 1 April 1959
471st Fighter-Bomber Squadron		Selfridge AFB	F-84		Inactivated in 1957
472d Fighter-Bomber Squadron		Willow Run Airport	F-84		Inactivated in 1957
474th Tactical Fighter Squadron		George AFB	F-100		Inactivated on 15 March 1959
476th Tactical Fighter Squadron		Seymour Johnson AFB	F-104C		Inactivated on 18 March 1969
477th Tactical Fighter Squadron		Cannon AFB	F-100C		Inactivated on 18 February 1959
478th Tactical Fighter Squadron		Homestead AFB	F-4E		Inactivated on 31 October 1970
480th Fighter Squadron		Spangdahlem AB	F-16C/D	"Warhawks"	
485th Fighter Squadron		AAF Station Fritzlar	P-51		Inactivated on 10 November 1945
492nd Fighter Squadron		RAF Lakenheath	F-15E	"Madhatters"	
493rd Fighter Squadron		RAF Lakenheath	F-35A	"Grim Reapers"	
494th Fighter Squadron		RAF Lakenheath	F-15E	"Panthers"	
495th Fighter Squadron		RAF Lakenheath	F-35A	"Valkyries"	

=== Squadrons 501 to 600 ===
Squadron	Shield	Location	Aircraft	Nickname	Note
509th Fighter Squadron		RAF Bentwaters	A-10A		Inactivated 30 December 1992
510th Fighter Squadron		RAF Bentwaters/Aviano AB	F-16C	"Buzzards"	
511th Fighter Squadron		RAF Bentwaters	A-10A	"Vultures"	Inactivated 30 December 1992
512th Fighter-Interceptor Squadron		RAF Manston	F-4		
513th Fighter-Interceptor Squadron		RAF Manston	F-86		Inactivated on 8 January 1961
514th Fighter-Interceptor Squadron		RAF Manston	F-86		
515th Fighter-Bomber Squadron					
516th Fighter-Bomber Squadron					
517th Fighter-Bomber Squadron					
518th Fighter-Interceptor Squadron					
519th Fighter-Interceptor Squadron					
520th Fighter-Interceptor Squadron					
521st Fighter-Bomber Squadron					
522d Fighter Squadron		Cannon AFB	F-16C	"Fireballs"	Inactivated, Redesignated 522d Special Operations Squadron in 2011
523d Fighter Squadron		Cannon AFB	F-16C	"Crusaders"	Inactivated
524th Fighter Squadron		Cannon AFB	F-16C	"Hounds of Heaven"	Redesignated 524th Special Operations Squadron in 2009
525th Fighter Squadron		Elmendorf AFB	F-22A	"Bulldogs"	
526th Fighter Squadron		Ramstein AB	F-16A		
527th Fighter Squadron					Redesignated 527th Space Aggressor Squadron
528th Fighter Squadron					
529th Fighter Squadron					
530th Fighter Squadron					
531st Fighter Squadron		Bien Hoa Air Base	F-100		Inactivated on 31 July 1970
532d Fighter-Day Squadron		Seymour Johnson AFB	F-100		Inactivated on 8 December 1957
533d Fighter-Day Squadron		Seymour Johnson AFB	F-100		Inactivated on 8 December 1957
534th Fighter-Day Squadron		Seymour Johnson AFB	F-100		Inactivated on 8 December 1957
535th Fighter Squadron					
536th Fighter Squadron					
537th Fighter Squadron					
538th Fighter-Interceptor Squadron		Larson AFB	F-104B		Discontinued on 1 July 1960
539th Fighter-Interceptor Squadron		McGuire Air Force Base	F-106		Inactivated on 23 August 1967
540th Fighter-Day Squadron		Greenville AFB	F-100		Inactivated on 8 February 1957
550th Fighter Squadron			F-15C	"Silver Eagles"	Active Associate
555th Fighter Squadron		Aviano AB	F-16C	"Triple Nickel"	
560th Tactical Fighter Squadron					Redesignated 560th Flying Training Squadron
561st Fighter Squadron		Nellis AFB	F-4G	"The Last Great Fighter Squadron"	Redesignated 561st Joint Tactics Squadron
562d Fighter Squadron		George AFB	F-4G		Redesignated 562d Flying Training Squadron
563d Fighter Squadron		George AFB	F-4G		Redesignated 563d Flying Training Squadron

=== Squadrons 601 to 999 ===
Squadron	Shield	Location	Aircraft	Nickname	Note
704th Fighter Squadron				"Outlaws"	Closed
706th Fighter Squadron		NAS JRB New Orleans	A-10	"Cajuns"	Redesignated 706th Aggressor Squadron (2023)
720th Fighter-Bomber Squadron		Foster AFB	F-100		Inactivated 1958 (then B-52 in SAC 1963–68)
