= 326th Aeronautical Systems Wing =

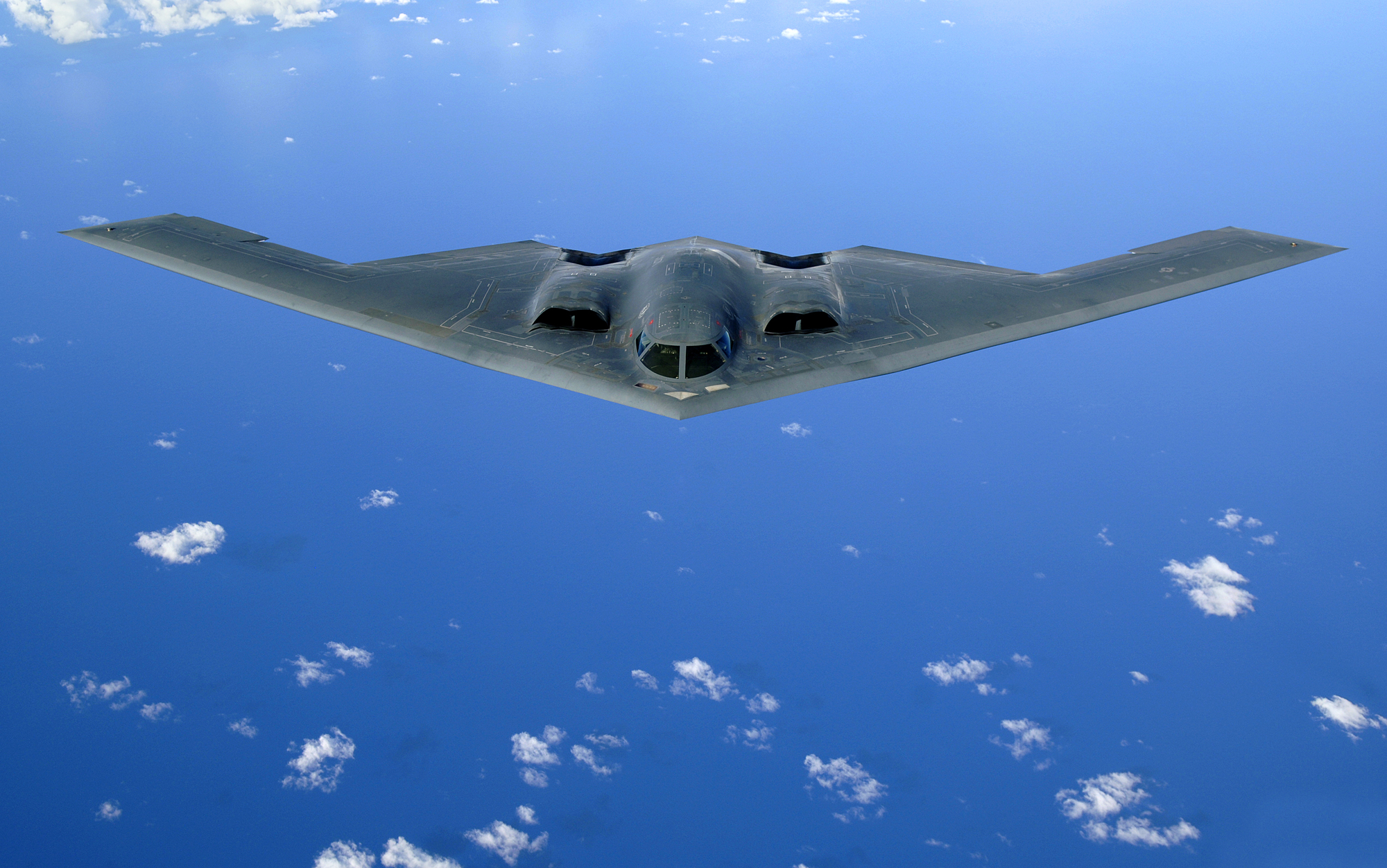
- Northrop Grumman B-2 Spirit
- Active: 1942–1944; 1955–1961; 2005–2008
- Country: United States
- Branch: United States Air Force
- Type: Aeronautical Systems Development
- Part of: Air Force Materiel Command
- Mottos: Fortiter et Sincere (Latin for 'Boldly and Sincerely')

Insignia
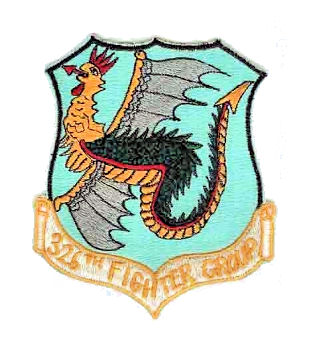
- Patch with 326th Fighter Group emblem (Note: Approved in slightly different form on 31 December 1942. Description: Azure, a cockatrice volant or crested and beaked gules.)

The 326th Aeronautical Systems Wing is an inactive wing of the United States Air Force. It was last assigned to the Aeronautical Systems Center at Wright-Patterson Air Force Base, Ohio, where it was inactivated in 2008.

The wing was first activated as the 326th Fighter Group in August 1942 during World War II and participated in the air defense of the Northeast until 1943, flying from Bradley Field, Connecticut. It moved to the Southeastern US where it was an operational and replacement training unit until it was disbanded in 1944 in a major reorganization of Army Air Forces units not programmed for overseas deployment.

The group was reconstituted in 1955 as part of an Air Defense Command program to revive fighter units that had participated in World War II. The group provided air defense of the Northwestern United States until 1961 when it was replaced by the 57th Fighter Group, which assumed its personnel, equipment and mission. It was redesignated as the 326th Tactical Fighter Group in 1985 but remained inactive.

In 2006, the group was consolidated with the Long Range Strike Systems Wing, which had been activated a year earlier at Wright-Patterson Air Force Base Ohio and the consolidated unit became the 326th Aeronautical Systems Wing. The wing conducted systems testing of advanced strike weapons for another two years before inactivating in 2008 when Air Force Materiel Command returned to its traditional directorate system of organization.

== History ==
=== World War II ===
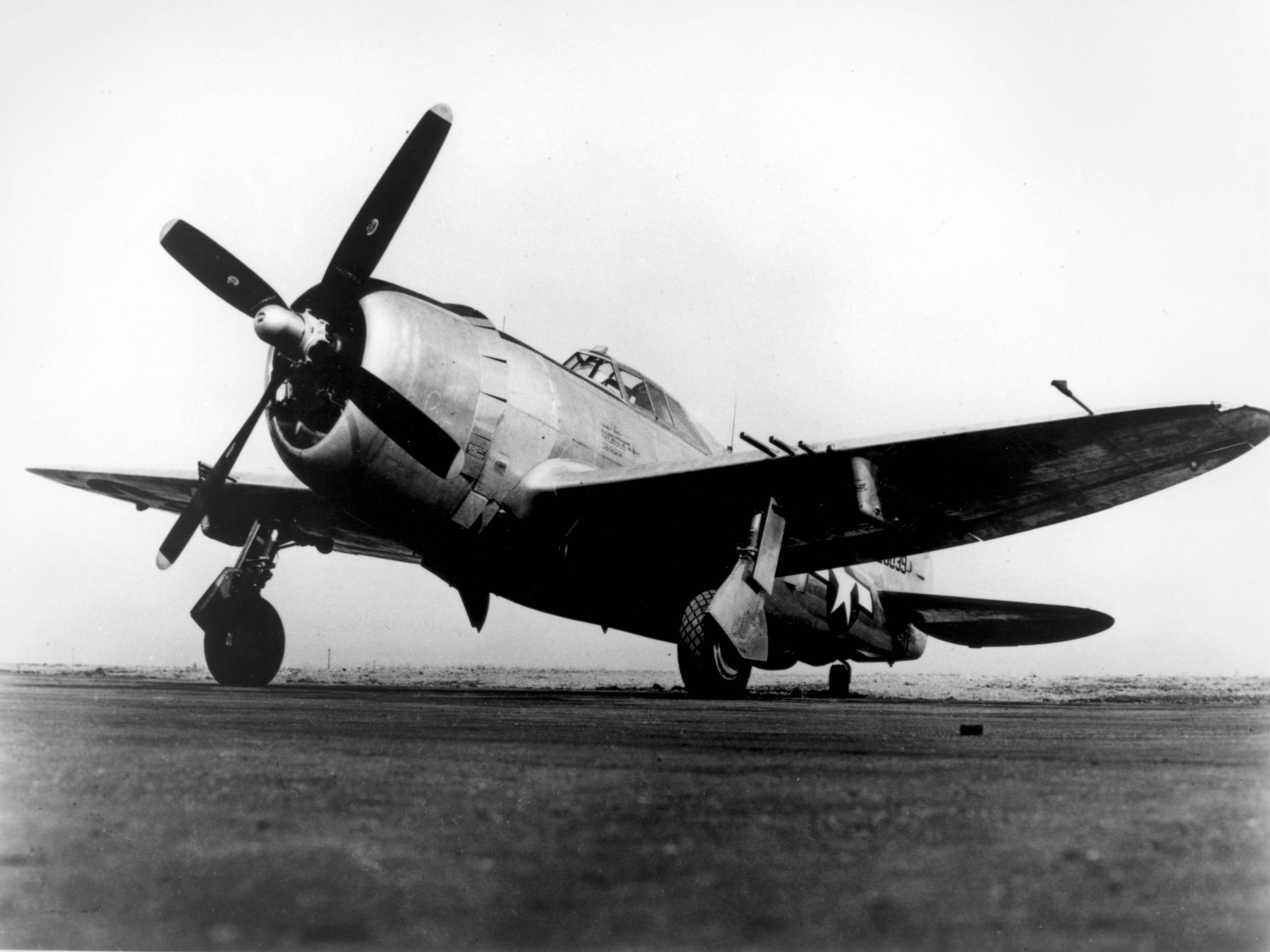
Republic P-47 Thunderbolt

The 326th Fighter Group was activated at Mitchel Field, New York in August 1942 and moved the next month to Bradley Field, Connecticut. It was initially assigned the 320th, 321st, and 322d Fighter Squadrons and equipped with Republic P-47 Thunderbolts. The 326th performed the air defense mission for First Air Force in the northeast during 1942 and 1943 while also conducting operational training. As an operational training unit, it was an oversized parent unit which provided cadres to "satellite groups."

It later became a replacement training unit, remaining an oversized unit, but preparing individual pilots for combat duty in the Thunderbolt. In the replacement role it added the 442d Fighter Squadron in February 1943. In the fall of 1943, the 320th Squadron returned to Mitchel, while the 442d Squadron moved to Bedford Army Air Field, Massachusetts.

In October 1943, the group provided the cadre to form the 402d Fighter Group. The 326th then moved to Seymour Johnson Field, North Carolina, along with the two squadrons stationed with group headquarters at Westover Field, Massachusetts. Its two squadrons at other stations, the 320th and the 442d, remained behind and were reassigned to the 402d Group. These two squadrons were replaced in North Carolina by the 538th and 539th Fighter Squadrons.

After arriving in North Carolina, the group resumed a split operation when the 538th and 529th Squadrons moved to Bluethenthal Field, North Carolina after they were organized . The Army Air Forces was finding that standard military units, based on relatively inflexible tables of organization were proving less well adapted to the training mission. Accordingly, it adopted a more functional system in which each of its bases was organized into a separate numbered unit. As a result, in 1944 the group was disbanded as the AAF converted to the AAF Base Unit system. The 123d AAF Base Unit (Replacement Training Unit, Fighter) replaced the group headquarters and squadrons at Seymour Johnson, and the 130th AAF Base Unit (Replacement Training Unit, Fighter) replaced the squadrons at Bluethenthal Field.

=== Cold War ===
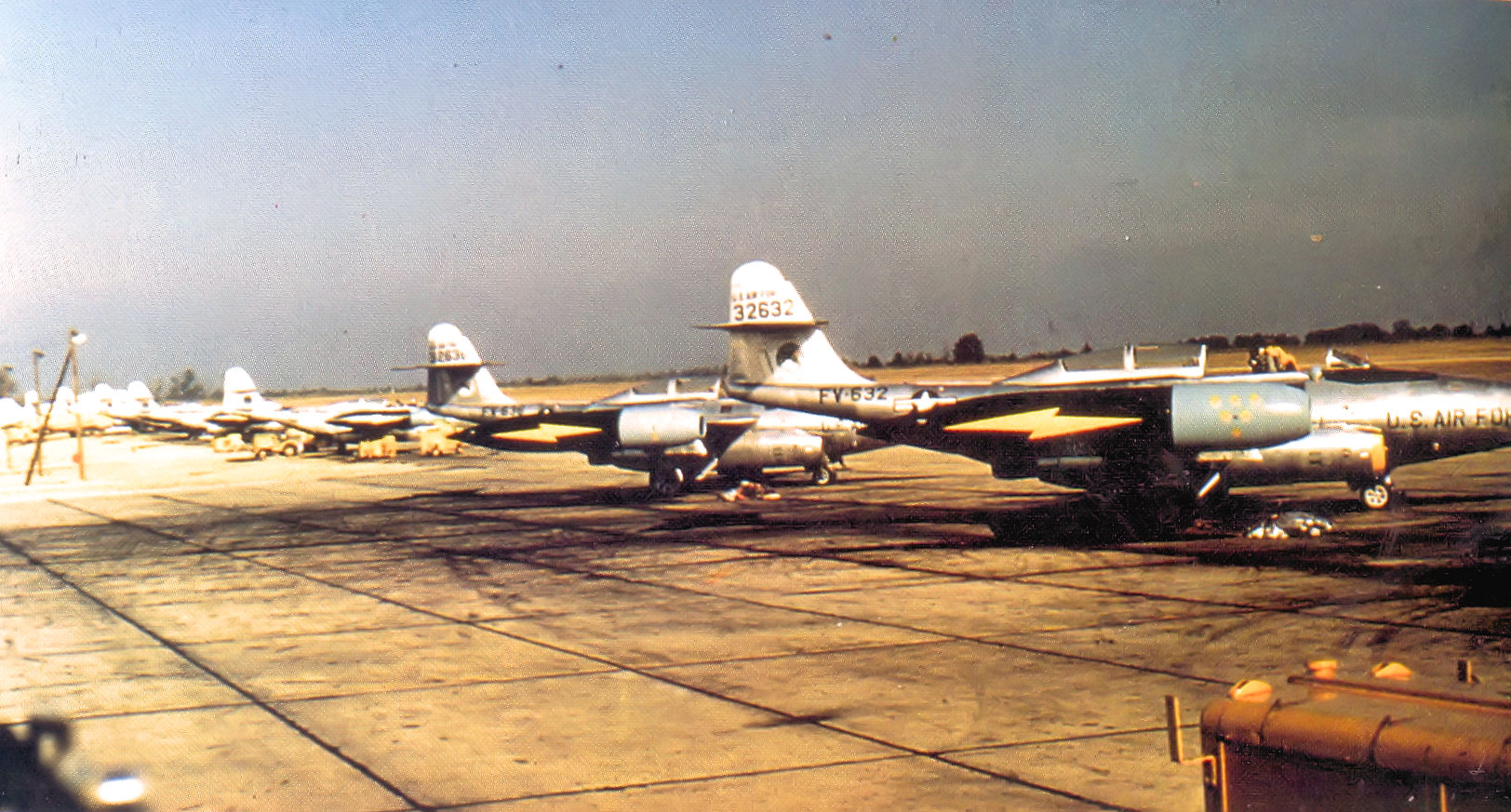
321st FIS F-89Js at Paine Field in 1956

The group was reconstituted, redesignated as the 326th Fighter Group (Air Defense) and activated in 1955 as an Air Defense Command (ADC) operational air defense unit at Paine Field, Washington. It absorbed the personnel and equipment of the inactivating 529th Air Defense Group as part of ADC's Project Arrow, which was designed to bring back on the active list the fighter units which had compiled memorable records in the two world wars. The 326th was equipped with Northrop F-89D Scorpions, armed with Mighty Mouse rockets, and became the USAF host unit at Paine. It was assigned a number of support organizations to fulfill its host responsibilities. Its 321st Fighter-Interceptor Squadron assumed the personnel and equipment of the 83d Fighter-Interceptor Squadron, which was transferred to Hamilton Air Force Base, California without personnel or equipment.

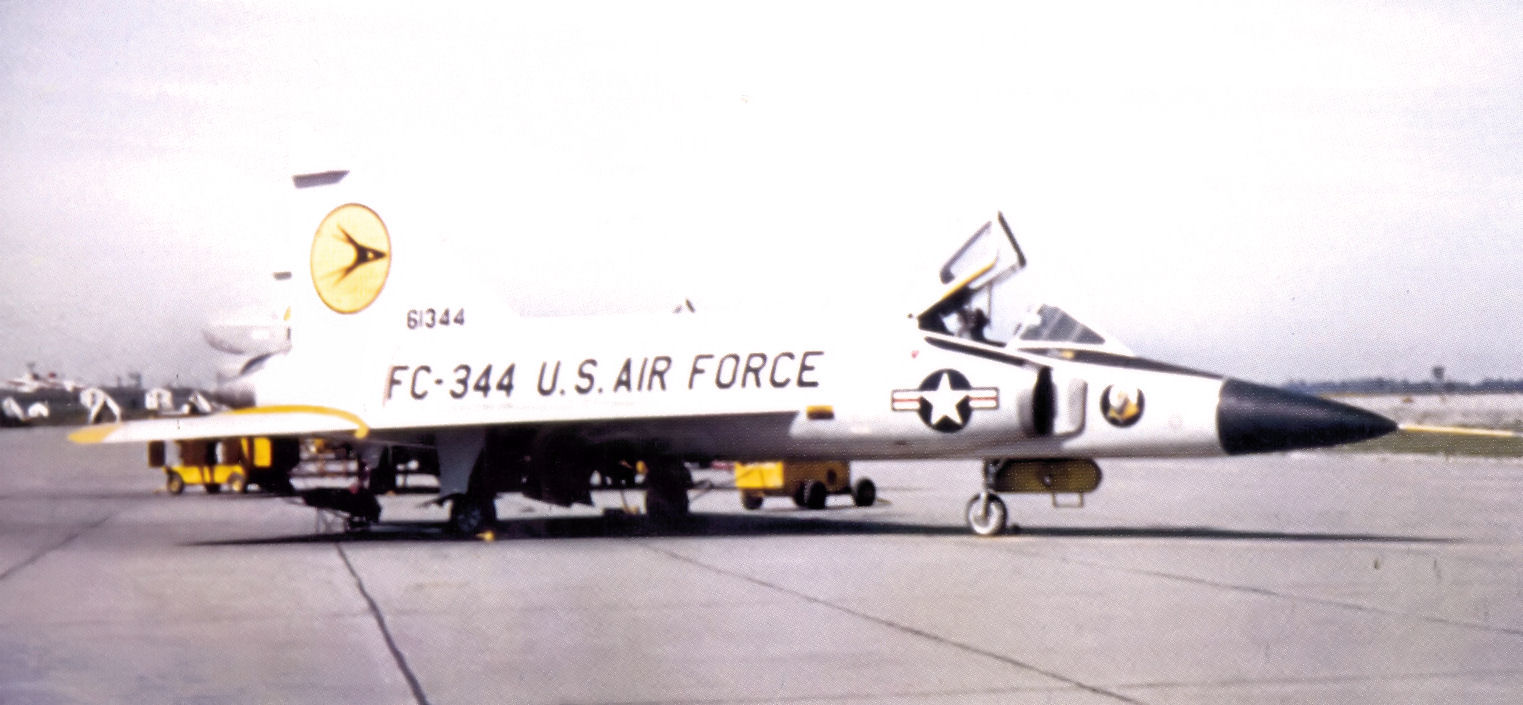
64th FIS F-102 at Paine field (Note: Aircraft is F-102A-75-CO Delta Dagger serial 56-1344. This plane crashed into Crystal Peak, South of Port Angeles, Washington on 8 February 1964 and its pilot died.)

The group received later model Scorpions and by 1956 was entirely equipped with the F-89H, which could carry AIM-4 Falcons in addition to the unguided Mighty Mouse rockets. It finally equipped with nuclear-capable F-89Js, armed with the AIR-2 Genie and equipped with data link for interception control through the Semi-Automatic Ground Environment system in the spring of 1958. For a brief period in 1960, the group was without an operational element, as the 321st Squadron was discontinued on 1 March and the 64th Fighter-Interceptor Squadron, which replaced it, did not move to Paine Field with its Convair F-102 Delta Daggers until 15 March. The group was inactivated in April 1961 and its personnel and equipment were reassigned to the 57th Fighter Group (Air Defense), which also assumed its mission.

=== Systems development ===
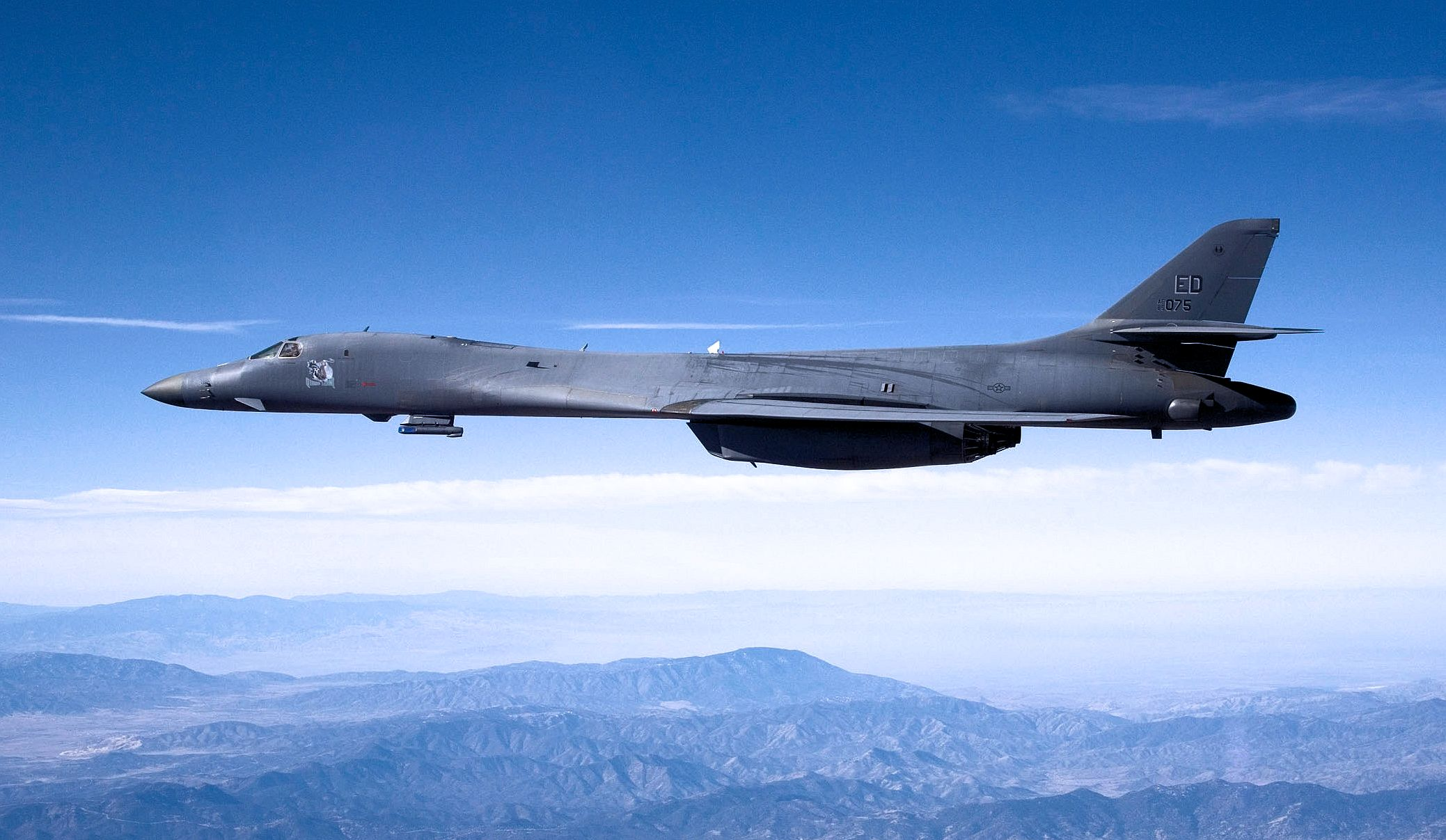
B-1 assigned to flight testing (Note: Aircraft is Rockwell B-1B Lancer Lot IV serial 85-75 testing a Sniper targeting pod with a multiple sensors.)

The wing was formed in 2005 as the Long Range Strike Systems Wing as part of the Air Force Materiel Command Transformation initiative that replaced traditional staff offices in the command's centers with wings, groups, and squadrons. It was redesignated the following year when it was consolidated with the 326th Tactical Fighter Group. The 326th was a 297-person unit directing more than 44 programs with a budget exceeding $5 billion, and was responsible for the program execution to develop, acquire, field and modernize existing and advanced aircraft strike capabilities. The wing consisted of the B-1 Systems Group (later the 326th Aeronautical Systems Group) for Rockwell B-1 Lancer systems, the B-2 Systems Group (later the 726th Aeronautical Systems Group) for Northrop Grumman B-2 Spirit systems, the Airborne Electronic Attack Systems Squadron (later the 651st Aeronautical Systems Squadron, (Note: Mr. Jackson's USAF biography indicates the squadron was also responsible for Boeing B-52 Stratofortress programs. Mr. Jackson was the director of the wing from its activation until February 2007.) and the F-117 Systems Squadron (later the 650th Aeronautical Systems Squadron) for Lockheed F-117 Nighthawk systems. It also provided operations management support to the Joint Unmanned Combat Air System Program Office. In 2008, the wing and its component groups were inactivated, while its two squadrons were reassigned to the 312th Aeronautical Systems Wing.

== Lineage ==
326th Fighter Group

- Constituted as 326th Fighter Group (Single Engine) on 24 June 1942

Activated on 19 August 1942
Disbanded on 10 April 1944

- Reconstituted and redesignated 326th Fighter Group (Air Defense) on 20 June 1955

Activated on 18 August 1955
Discontinued and inactivated on 1 April 1961
Redesignated 326th Tactical Fighter Group on 31 July 1985

- Consolidated with Long Range Strike Systems Wing on 23 June 2006 as the Long Range Strike Systems Wing

Long Range Strike Systems Wing

- Constituted on as Long Range Strike Systems Wing on 23 November 2004

Activated on 18 January 2005

- Consolidated with the 326th Tactical Fighter Group on 23 June 2006

Consolidated Wing

- Long Range Strike Systems Wing and 326th Tactical Fighter Group consolidated on 23 June 2006

Redesignated 326th Aeronautical Systems Wing on 14 July 2006
Inactivated on 30 June 2008

=== Assignments ===
- New York Air Defense Wing, 19 August 1942
- I Fighter Command, 13 Oct 43 – 10 April 1944
- 25th Air Division, 18 August 1955
- Seattle Air Defense Sector, 10 February 1960 – 1 April 1961
- Aeronautical Systems Center, 23 June 2006 – 30 June 2008

=== Components ===
Groups

- B-1 Systems Group (later 326th Aeronautical Systems Group), 18 January 2005 – 30 June 2008
- B-2 Systems Group (later 726th Aeronautical Systems Group), 18 January 2005 – 30 June 2008

Operational Squadrons

- 64th Fighter-Interceptor Squadron, 15 March 1960 – 1 April 1961
- 320th Fighter Squadrons, 19 August 1942 – 25 November 1943
- 321st Fighter (later Fighter-Interceptor) Squadron, 19 August 1942 – 10 April 1944; 18 August 1955 – 1 March 1960
- 322d Fighter Squadron, 19 August 1942 – 10 April 1944
- 442d Fighter Squadron, 24 February – 25 November 1943
- 538th Fighter Squadron, 25 November 1943 – 10 April 1944
- 539th Fighter Squadron, 25 November 1943 – 10 April 1944

Support Units

- 326th USAF Infirmary (later 326th USAF Dispensary), 18 April 1955 – 1 April 1961
- 326th Air Base Squadron, 18 April 1955 – 1 April 1961
- 326th Consolidated Aircraft Maintenance Squadron, 8 July 1957 – 1 April 1961
- 326th Materiel Squadron, 18 April 1955 – 1 April 1961
- Airborne Electronic Attack Systems Squadron (later 651st Aeronautical Systems Squadron), 18 January 2005 – 30 June 2008
- F-117 Systems Squadron (later 650th Aeronautical Systems Squadron), 18 January 2005 – 30 June 2008

 

=== Stations ===
- Mitchel Field, New York, 19 August 1942
- Bradley Field, Connecticut, 1 September 1942
- Westover Field, Massachusetts, 1 November 1942
- Seymour Johnson Field, North Carolina, 13 October 1943 – 10 April 1944
- Paine Field, Washington, 18 August 1955 – 1 April 1961
- Wright-Patterson Air Force Base, Ohio, 18 January 2005 – 30 June 2008

=== Aircraft ===
- P-47 Thunderbolt, 1942–1944
- F-89D Scorpion, 1955–1956
- F-89H Scorpion, 1956–1958
- F-89J Scorpion, 1958–1960
- F-102A Delta Dagger, 1960–1961
- TF-102B Delta Dagger, 1960–1961

=== Campaigns ===
Campaign Streamer	Campaign	Dates	Notes
	American Theater without inscription	19 August 1942 – 10 April 1944	326th Fighter Group

== See also ==
- F-89 Scorpion units of the United States Air Force
- List of inactive AFCON wings of the United States Air Force
- List of United States Air Force Aerospace Defense Command Interceptor Squadrons
