= 442nd Tactical Fighter Training Squadron =

442d Tactical Fighter Training Squadron
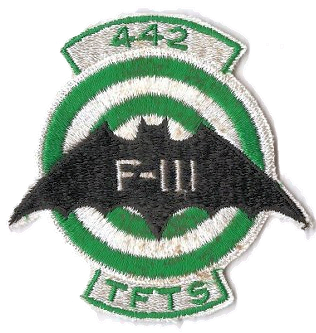
- Emblem of the 442d Tactical Fighter Training Squadron
- Active: 1943-1977
- Country: United States
- Branch: United States Air Force

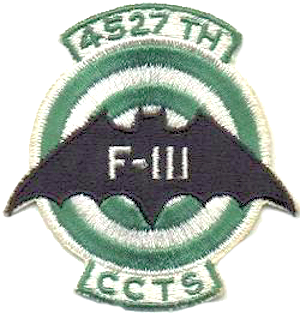
Emblem of the 4527th Combat Crew Training Squadron

The 442d Tactical Fighter Training Squadron is an inactive United States Air Force unit. It was last assigned to the 474th Tactical Fighter Wing and stationed at Nellis Air Force Base, Nevada.

== History ==
Established in 1943 as a P-47 Thunderbolt Replacement Training Squadron (RTU) under I Fighter Command. Also performed air defense over New England. Inactivated in 1944 with the end of RTU training. Activated in 1956 under Tactical Air Command and programmed for F-100 Super Sabres. Never manned or equipped, inactivated in early 1957.

Reactivated in 1969 as a General Dynamics F-111A training squadron, assigned to the 474th Tactical Fighter Wing. It was inactivated in 1977 when the parent wing transferred its F-111 aircraft to the 366th TFW at Mountain Home AFB, Idaho.

=== Lineage ===
- Constituted 442d Fighter Squadron on 19 Feb 1943

Activated on 24 Feb 1943
Disbanded on 10 Apr 1944.

- Reconstituted, and redesignated 442d Fighter-Day Squadron, on 4 Oct 1956.

Activated on 15 Oct 1956
Inactivated on 8 Feb 1957

- Established and activated by Tactical Air Command as the 4527th Combat Crew Training Squadron on 20 January 1968

Inactivated on 15 October 1969

- Re-designated as 442d Tactical Fighter Training Squadron on 1 October 1969

Organized on 15 October 1969, assuming assets of TAC 4527th Combat Crew Training Squadron
Inactivated on 31 July 1977

=== Assignments ===
- 326th Fighter Group, 24 Feb 1943
- 402d Fighter Group, 25 Nov 1943 – 10 Apr 1944
- 402d Fighter-Day Group, 15 Oct 1956 – 8 Feb 1957
- 474th Tactical Fighter Wing, 20 January 1968 – 31 July 1977

=== Stations ===
- Westover Field, Massachusetts, 24 Feb 1943
- Bedford Army Airfield, Massachusetts, 17 Sep 1943
- Hillsgrove Army Airfield, Rhode Island, 21 Nov 1943 – 10 Apr 1944
- Greenville AFB, Mississippi, 15 Oct 1956 – 8 Feb 1957
- Nellis AFB, Nevada, 20 January 1968 – 31 July 1977

=== Aircraft ===
- P-47 Thunderbolt, 1943-1944
- General Dynamics F-111A, 1968-1977
