= 321st Fighter-Interceptor Squadron =

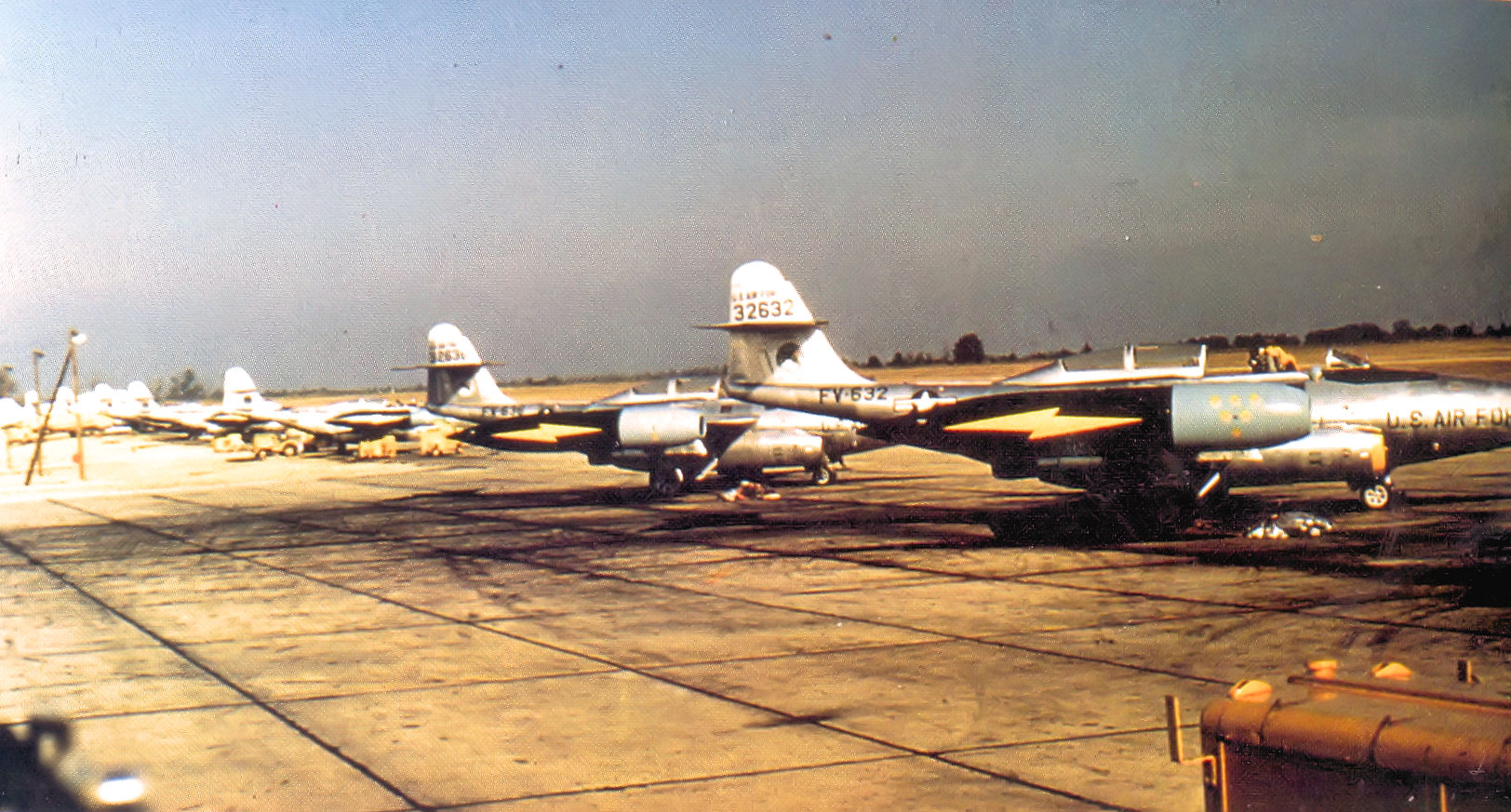
- Squadron F-89J Scorpionsat Paine Air Force Base, Washington in 1956
- Active: 1942–1944; 1955–1960
- Country: United States
- Branch: United States Air Force
- Role: Fighter interceptor

Insignia
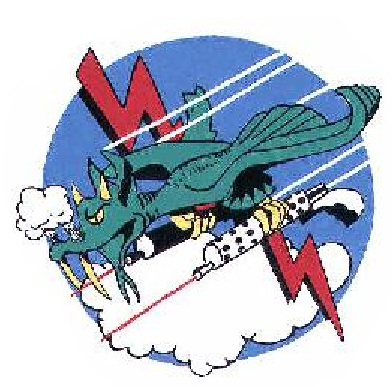
- 321st Fighter-Interceptor Squadron emblem (Note: Approved 9 January 1943. Description: Over and through a light blue disc, a green dragon bird blowing steam from nostrils and having yellow feet, fangs and horns, diving bend-sinisterwise, holding a machine gun in each foot, emitting fire proper, all in front of a red lightning bolt bendwise and white cloud formation in base.)

The 321st Fighter-Interceptor Squadron is an inactive United States Air Force unit. Its last assignment was with the 316th Air Division, stationed at Paine Air Force Base, Washington, where it was inactivated on 8 March 1960.

== History ==
=== World War II ===
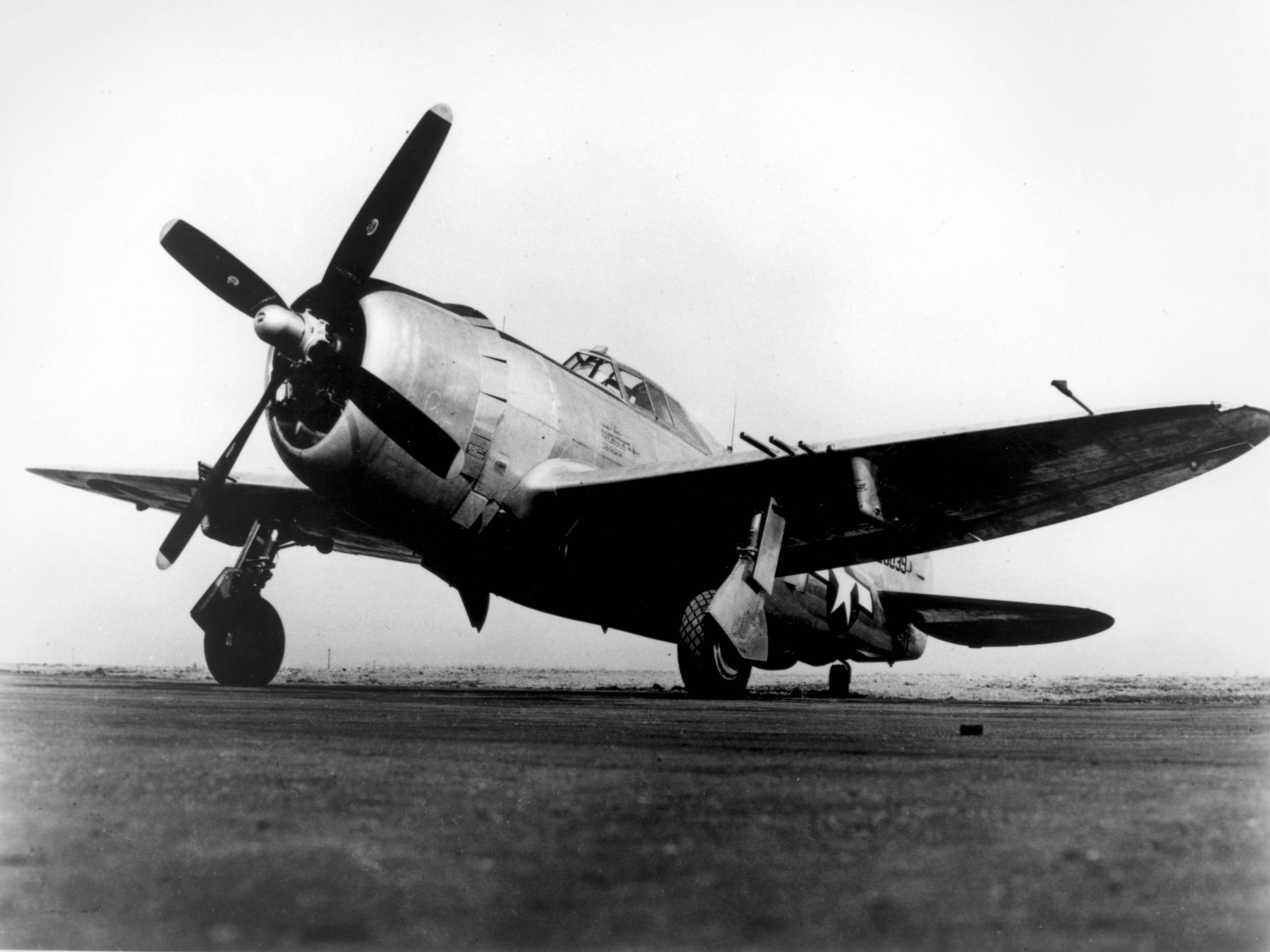
Republic P-47 Thunderbolt

The 321st Fighter Squadron was activated at Mitchel Field, New York in August 1942 as one of the original squadrons of the 326th Fighter Group and moved the next month to Bradley Field, Connecticut and equipped with Republic P-47 Thunderbolts. The 321st performed the air defense mission for First Air Force in the northeast during 1942 and 1943 while also conducting operational training. Operational training units were oversized parent units which provided cadres to "satellite groups."

It later became a replacement training unit, remaining an oversized unit, but preparing individual pilots for combat duty in the Thunderbolt. In October 1943, the 326th Group provided the cadre to form the 402d Fighter Group. The 321st then moved to Seymour Johnson Field, North Carolina, along with the group headquarters and the other group squadron (the 322d) stationed at Westover Field, Massachusetts. (Note: The two squadrons located at Bedford Army Air Field, Massachusetts were transferred to the 402d Group. Maurer, Combat Squadrons, pp. 393, 547–548.)

However, the Army Air Forces was finding that standard military units, based on relatively inflexible tables of organization were proving not well adapted to the training mission. Accordingly, it adopted a more functional system in which each of its bases was organized into a separate numbered unit. As a result, in 1944 the squadron was disbanded as the AAF converted to the AAF Base Unit system. The 123d AAF Base Unit (Replacement Training Unit, Fighter) replaced the group headquarters and squadrons at Seymour Johnson.

=== Cold War air defense ===
The squadron was reconstituted, redesignated as the 321st Fighter-Interceptor Squadron and activated in 1955 as an Air Defense Command (ADC) operational air defense unit at Paine Air Force Base, Washington. It absorbed the personnel and equipment of the 83d Fighter-Interceptor Squadron as part of ADC's Project Arrow, which was designed to bring back on the active list the fighter units which had compiled memorable records in the two world wars. The 321st was equipped with Northrop F-89D Scorpions, armed with Mighty Mouse rockets.

The group received later model Scorpions and by 1956 was entirely equipped with the F-89H, which could carry AIM-4 Falcons in addition to the unguided Mighty Mouse rockets. It finally equipped with nuclear-capable F-89Js, armed with the AIR-2 Genie and equipped with data link for interception control through the Semi-Automatic Ground Environment system in the spring of 1958. The 321st Squadron was discontinued on 1 March 1960 in preparation for the move of the 64th Fighter-Interceptor Squadron and its Convair F-102 Delta Daggers to Paine from Alaska.

== Lineage ==
- Constituted as the 321st Fighter Squadron (Single Engine) on 24 June 1942

Activated on 25 August 1942
Disbanded on 10 April 1944

- Reconstituted and redesignated 321st Fighter-Interceptor Squadron on 20 June 1955

Activated on 18 August 1955
Discontinued on 1 March 1960

=== Assignments ===
- 326th Fighter Group, 25 August 1942 – 10 April 1944, 18 August 1955 – 1 March 1960

=== Stations ===
- Mitchel Field, New York, 19 August 1942
- Bradley Field, Connecticut, 2 September 194
- Westover Field, Massachusetts, 1 November 1942
- Seymour Johnson Field, North Carolina, 17 October 1943 – 10 April 1944
- Paine Air Force Base, Washington, 18 August 1955 – 1 March 1960

=== Aircraft ===
- Republic P-47 Thunderbolt, 1942–1944
- Northrop F-89D Scorpion, 1955–1956
- Northrop F-89H Scorpion, 1956–1958
- Northrop F-89J Scorpion, 1958–1960
