= 538th Fighter-Interceptor Squadron =

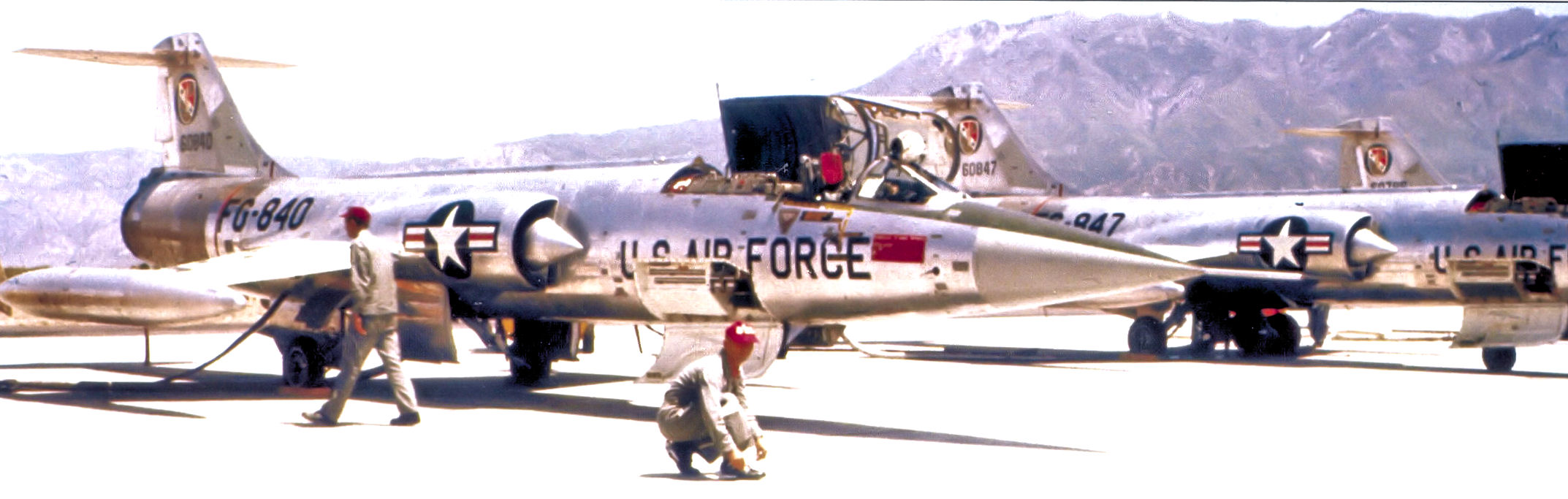
- Squadron F-104s at Luke Air Force Base (Note: Aircraft are Lockheed F-104A-25-LO Starfighters serials 56–840 and 56–847. Taken in 1958.)
- Active: 1943–1944; 1955–1960
- Country: United States
- Branch: United States Air Force
- Role: fighter
- Decorations: Air Force Outstanding Unit Award

Insignia
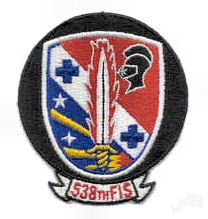
- 538th Fighter-Interceptor Squadron emblem (approved 20 December 1956)

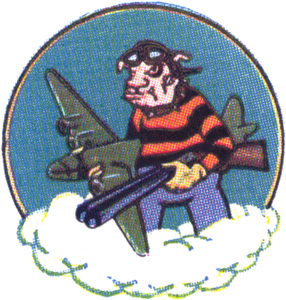
- 538th Fighter Squadron emblem (World War II)

The 538th Fighter-Interceptor Squadron is a discontinued unit of the United States Air Force. It was last assigned to the Spokane Air Defense Sector at Larson Air Force Base, Washington, in mid-1960.

The squadron was first activated during World War II as the 538th Fighter Squadron. It briefly served as a Republic P-47 Thunderbolt replacement unit before being disbanded in a major reorganization of Army Air Forces training units in the spring of 1944. The squadron was again activated in 1955 as an interceptor unit of Air Defense Command, defending the northwestern United States. It was inactivated in 1960, when the Air Force transferred its Lockheed F-104 Starfighters to the Air National Guard.

== History ==
=== World War II ===
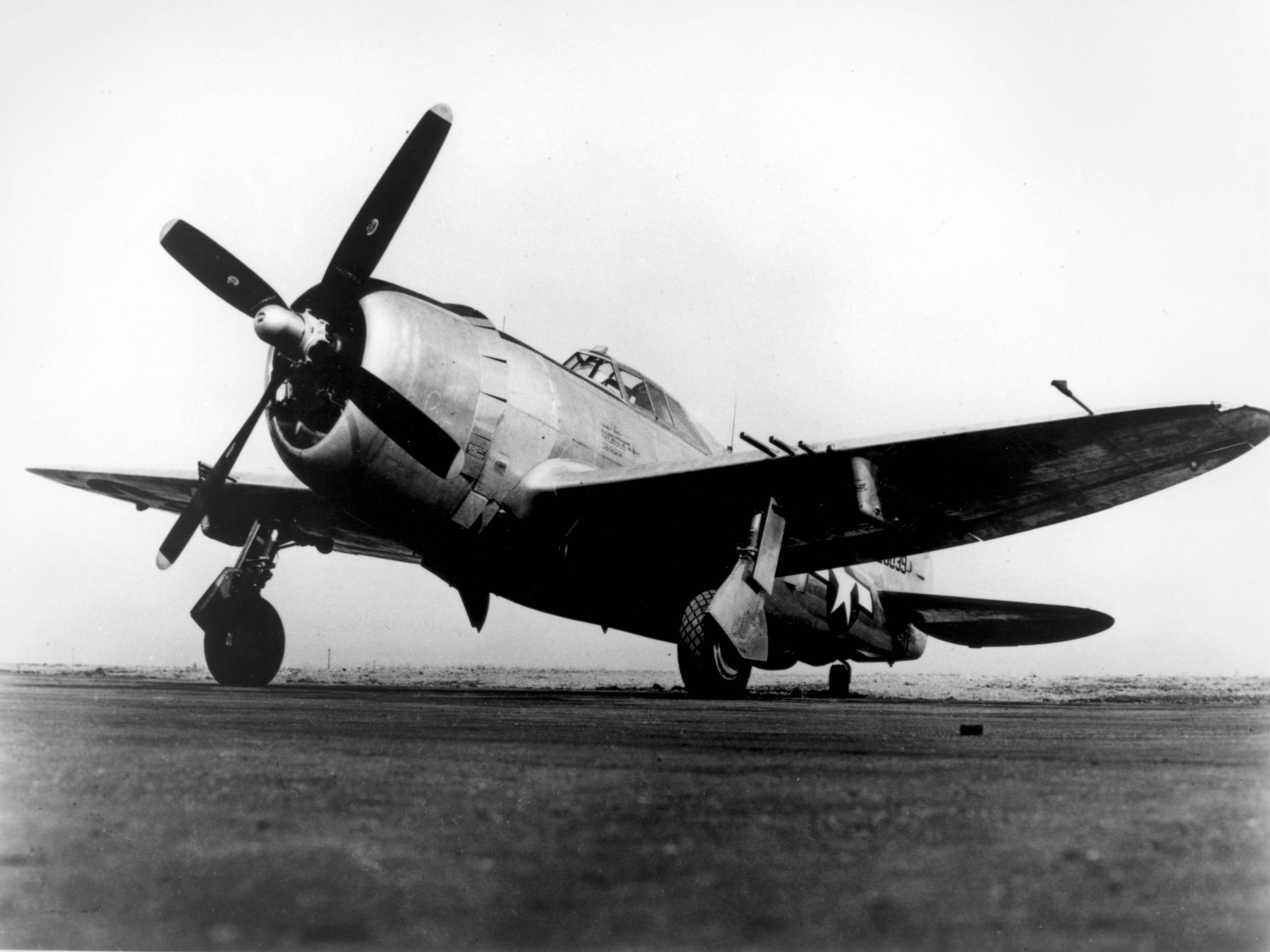
P-47 as flown by the squadron in 1944

The squadron was first activated by I Fighter Command in October 1943 at Westover Field, Massachusetts as one of the three original squadrons of the 402d Fighter Group. Less than two weeks later, the squadron moved with its group headquarters to Seymour Johnson Field, North Carolina. At Seymour Johnson, the 538th and 539th Fighter Squadrons of the 402d Group were reassigned to the 326th Fighter Group, which transferred two of its squadrons to the 402d.

The 326th Group was a Replacement Training Unit for Republic P-47 Thunderbolt pilots. Replacement Training Units were oversized units that trained individual pilots. Like most such units, the 326th prepared to conduct a split operation and the 538th and 539th Squadrons moved to Bluethenthal Field, North Carolina, while group headquarters and its other two squadrons remained at Seymour Johnson. The squadron finally received its Thunderbolts in early 1944 and began operations. However, the Army Air Forces was finding that standard military units, based on relatively inflexible tables of organization, were not proving to be well adapted to the training mission. Accordingly, it adopted a more functional system in which each base was organized into a separate numbered unit. The 538th was disbanded and its mission, personnel and equipment were transferred to the 124th AAF Base Unit (Fighter) and combined with other units at Bluethenthal.

=== Air Defense ===
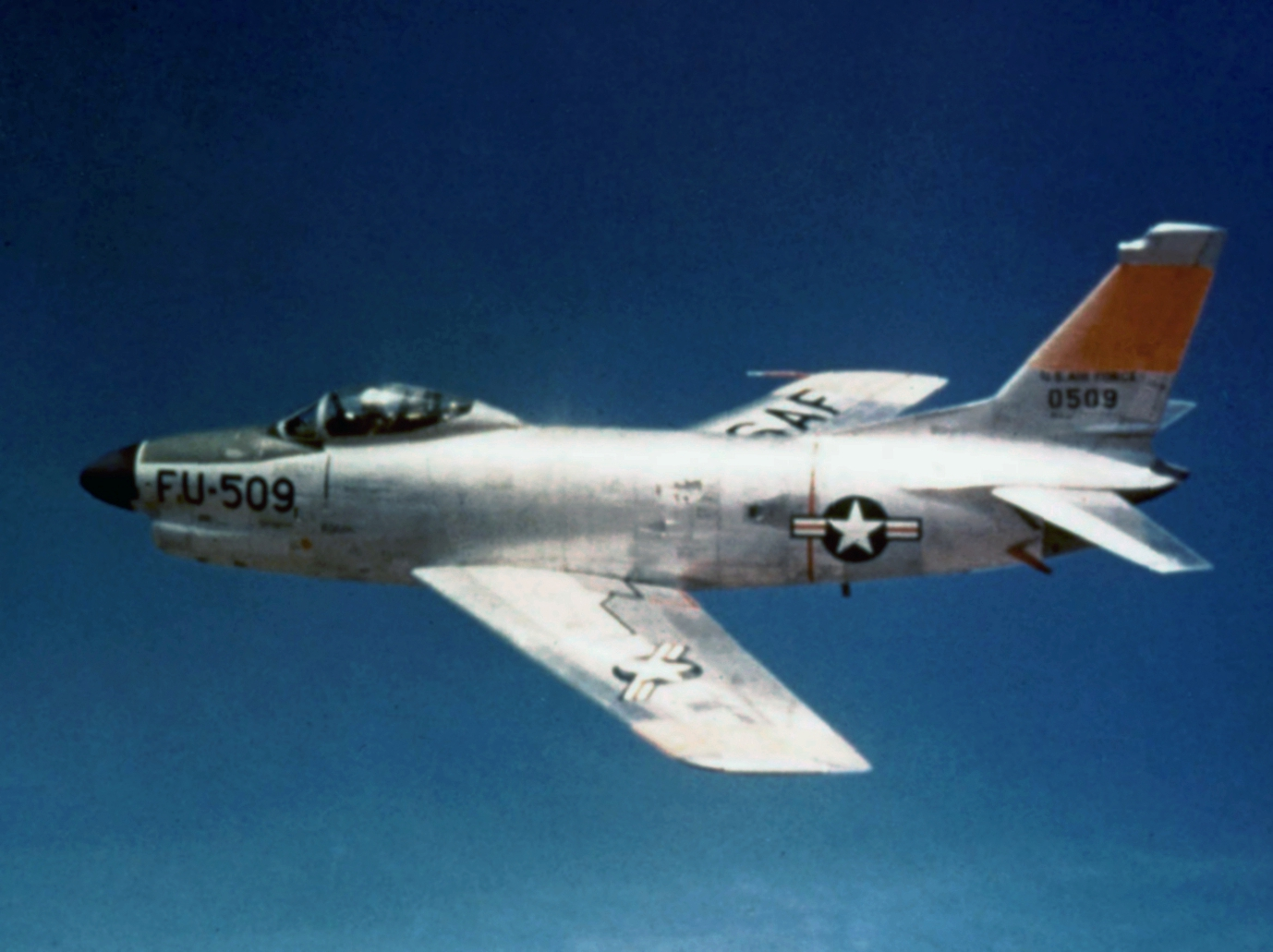
North American F-86D

In the summer of 1955 Air Defense Command (ADC) implemented Project Arrow, which was designed to bring back on the active list the fighter units which had compiled memorable records in the two world wars. Project Arrow also reunited fighter squadrons with their traditional headquarters. As a result, the 323d Fighter-Interceptor Squadron at Larson Air Force Base, Washington moved to Truax Field, Wisconsin to join the 327th Fighter Group there. The 538th was reconstituted as the 538th Fighter-Interceptor Squadron and activated at Larson to take over the mission, personnel and equipment of the departing 323d Squadron.

The squadron also took over the 323d's radar equipped and Mighty Mouse rocket armed North American F-86D Sabres. By the fall of 1957, the 538th had re-equipped with the F-86L Sabre, which was equipped with data link for interception control through the Semi-Automatic Ground Environment (SAGE) system. Squadron experience with the F-86L was short-lived however, as the squadron began transition into the Lockheed F-104A Starfighter about June 1958.

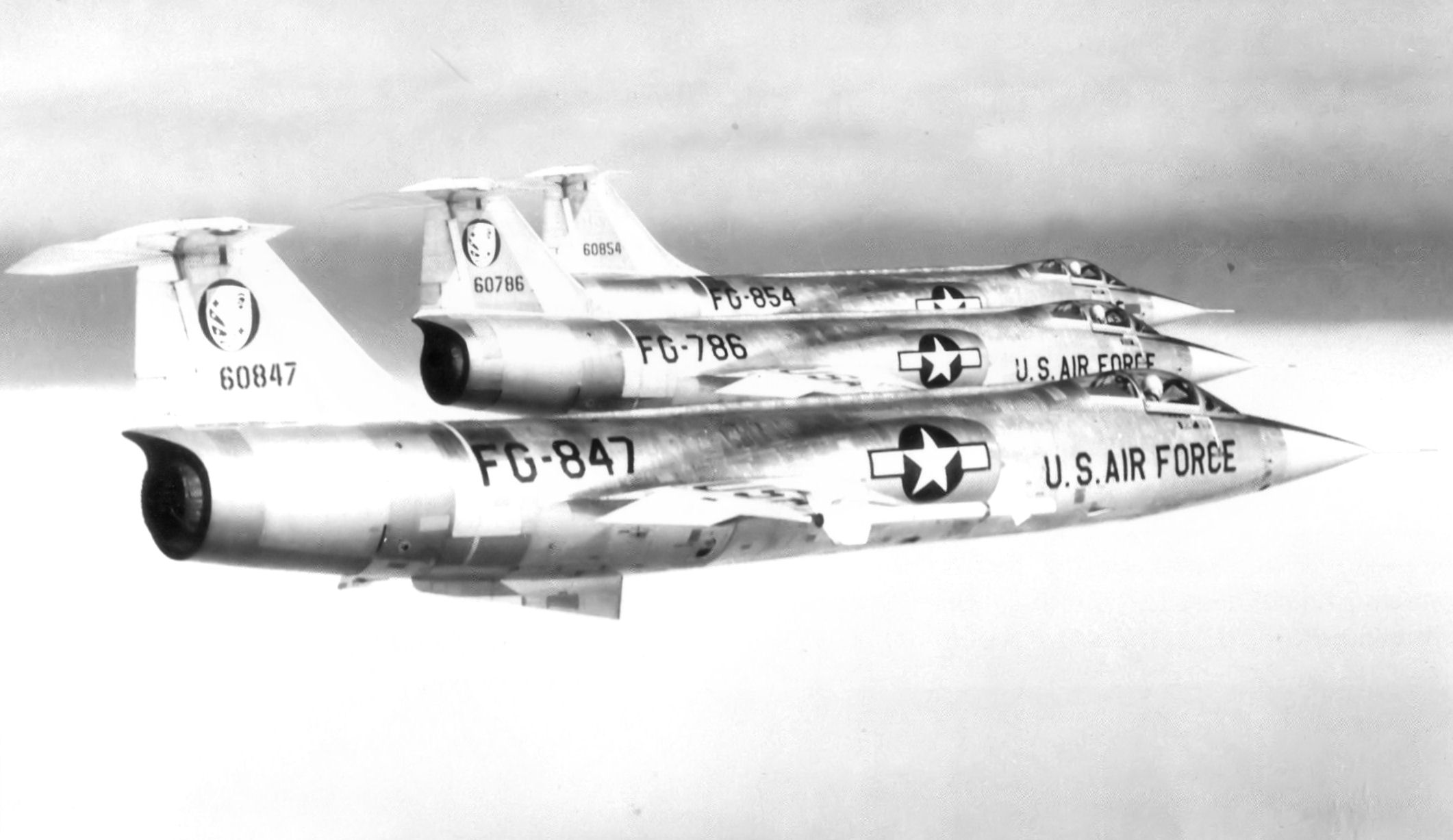
538th FIS F-104A Starfighters (Note: Taken at Hamilton Air Force Base, California in 1958. Visible are Lockheed F-104A Starfighters serials 56–781 and 58–769.)

The 538th was the fourth ADC squadron to equip with the Starfighter. The squadron also received the two-seat, dual-control, combat trainer F-104B. The performance of the F-104B was almost identical to that of the F-104A, but its smaller internal fuel capacity reduced its effective range considerably. However, ADC did not believe the F-104A was well suited for service as an interceptor aircraft. Its short range and lack of all-weather capability made it incapable of integrating into the SAGE system. All ADC F-104As, including those of the 538th, were transferred to the Air National Guard and the squadron was inactivated in July 1960. (Note: During the Cuban Missile Crisis, the F-104's superior fighter versus fighter capability resulted in a reversal of this judgment and Air National Guard F-104s were returned to ADC for use in Florida. McMullen, p. 17)

== Lineage ==
- Constituted as the 538th Fighter Squadron on 14 September 1943

Activated on 1 October 1943
Disbanded on 10 April 1944

- Reconstituted and redesignated 538th Fighter-Interceptor Squadron on 20 June 1955

Activated on 18 August 1955
Discontinued on 1 July 1960

=== Assignments ===
- 402d Fighter Group, 1 October 1943
- 326th Fighter Group, 25 November 1943 – 10 April 1944
- 9th Air Division, 18 August 1955
- 4721st Air Defense Group, 1 December 1956
- 4700th Air Defense Wing, 1 May 1959
- Spokane Air Defense Sector, 15 May – 1 July 1960

=== Stations ===
- Westover Field, Massachusetts, 1 October 1943
- Seymour Johnson Field, North Carolina, 13 October 1943
- Bluethenthal Field, North Carolina, 8 December 1943 – 10 April 1944
- Larson Air Force Base, Washington, 18 August 1955 – 1 July 1960

=== Aircraft ===
- Republic P-47 Thunderbolt, 1944
- North American F-86D Sabre, 1955–1957
- North American F-86L Sabre, 1957–1958
- Lockheed F-104A Starfighter, 1958–1960
- Lockheed F-104B Starfighter, 1958–1960

=== Award ===
Award streamer	Award	Dates	Notes
	Air Force Outstanding Unit Award	11 July 1958–14 November 1959	538th Fighter-Interceptor Squadron

== See also ==
- Aerospace Defense Command Fighter Squadrons
- List of F-86 Sabre units
- List of F-104 Starfighter operators

== Notes ==
Explanatory notes

Citations

=== Bibliography ===
- Buss, Lydus H.(ed), Sturm, Thomas A., Volan, Denys, and McMullen, Richard F., History of Continental Air Defense Command and Air Defense Command July to December 1955, Directorate of Historical Services, Air Defense Command, Ent AFB, CO, (1956)
- Cornett, Lloyd H; Johnson, Mildred W (1980). A Handbook of Aerospace Defense Organization, 1946 - 1980 (PDF). Peterson AFB, CO: Office of History, Aerospace Defense Center. Archived from the original (PDF) on 23 November 2006.
- Craven, Wesley F; Cate, James L, eds. (1955). The Army Air Forces in World War II. Vol. VI, Men & Planes. Chicago, Illinois: University of Chicago Press. LCCN 48003657. OCLC 704158.

Goss, William A (1955). "The Organization and its Responsibilities, Chapter 2 The AAF". In Craven, Wesley F; Cate, James L (eds.). The Army Air Forces in World War II. Vol. VI, Men & Planes. Chicago, Illinois: University of Chicago Press. LCCN 48003657. OCLC 704158.

- Maurer, Maurer, ed. (1983) [1961]. Air Force Combat Units of World War II (PDF) (reprint ed.). Washington, DC: Office of Air Force History. ISBN 0-912799-02-1. LCCN 61060979. Archived from the original (PDF) on 20 December 2016.
- Maurer, Maurer, ed. (1982) [1969]. Combat Squadrons of the Air Force, World War II (PDF) (reprint ed.). Washington, DC: Office of Air Force History. ISBN 0-405-12194-6. LCCN 70605402. OCLC 72556. Archived from the original (PDF) on 20 December 2016.
- McMullen, Richard F. (1964) The Fighter Interceptor Force 1962-1964, ADC Historical Study No. 27 (Confidential, declassified 22 March 2000)
- "ADCOM's Fighter Interceptor Squadrons". The Interceptor. 21 (1). Aerospace Defense Command: 5–11, 26–31, 40–45, 54–59. January 1979.
