= Norfolk Fighter Wing =

- Active: 1942–1946
- Country: United States
- Branch: United States Army Air Forces
- Role: Fighter
- Engagements: World War II

The Norfolk Fighter Wing is a disbanded United States Army Air Forces unit. Its last assignment was with the I Fighter Command, stationed at Norfolk Airport, Virginia.

The wing reported to First Air Force and was responsible for the air defense of the Norfolk area during World War II. The unit was not manned after July 1944, and inactivated after the end of the war on 3 April 1946.

== History ==
The unit was constituted as the "Norfolk Air Defense Wing" on 6 August 1942 and activated on 11 August 1942 as part of the First Air Force, stationed in Norfolk. The wing was responsible for the air defense of the Norfolk area, operating with attached Army Air Force organizations and co-operating naval aircraft. The wing was commanded by Colonel Malcolm N. Stewart. On 24 September 1942, Colonel Murray C. Woodbury took command. After Woodbury was promoted to command of the 5th Air Defense Wing, Major Earl H. Dunham became the wing commander in April 1943. On 30 June, Colonel Burton M. Hovey became the unit's commander. He was soon transferred to command the Philadelphia Fighter Wing, and now-Lieutenant Colonel Dunham commanded the wing again from 14 August. In July it was redesignated as the Norfolk Fighter Wing. Around 25 November Lieutenant Colonel Otis F. Tabler became wing commander. Lieutenant Colonel Charles A. Gayle became the wing's last commander around 2 April 1944. The wing was unmanned, without personnel, from July. It was inactivated on 3 April 1946 and disbanded on 8 October 1948.

For the period it was active it was assigned to I Fighter Command and stationed at Norfolk Airport, Virginia.
