= 50th Fighter-Bomber Squadron =

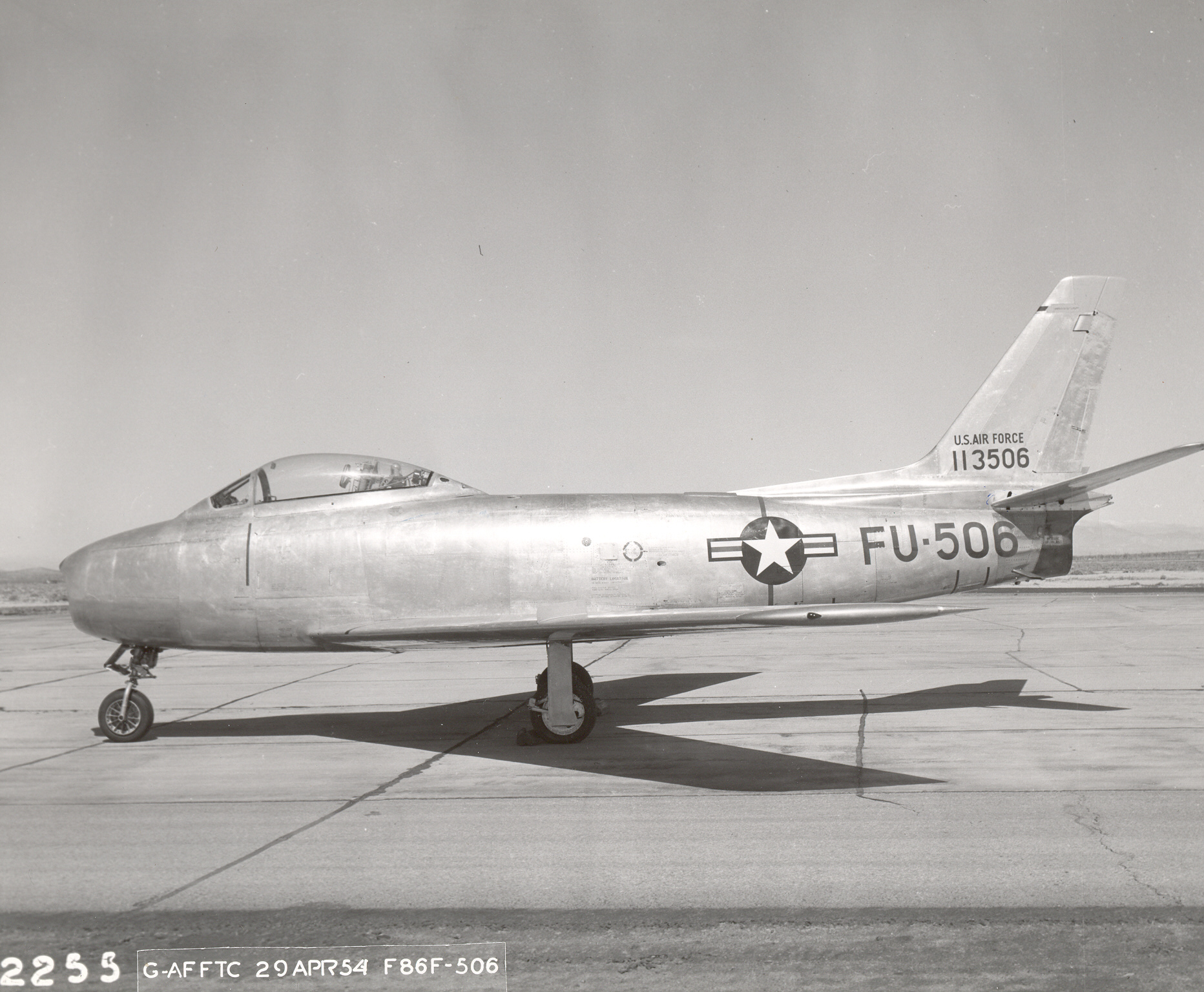
- F-86 Sabre, last plane flown by the squadron
- Active: 1941–1944; 1947–1949; 1949–1951; 1957
- Country: United States
- Branch: United States Air Force
- Role: Fighter-Bomber
- Engagements: American Theater Antisubmarine Campaign

Insignia
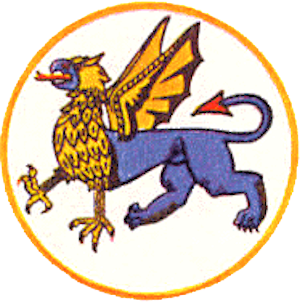
- 50th Fighter-Bomber Squadron emblem (Note: Approved 9 March 1943. Description: On a disc white, thin border deep yellow, a blue griffin passant, trimmed gold, armed and langued gules.)

The 50th Fighter-Bomber Squadron is an inactive United States Air Force unit. It was last assigned to the 319th Fighter-Bomber Group at New Orleans Naval Air Station, Louisiana, where it was inactivated on 16 November 1957.

The squadron was first activated in 1941 as the 50th Bombardment Squadron. Following the entry of the United States into World War II, the squadron engaged in antisubmarine warfare patrols, but then became a training unit until spring 1944, when it was disbanded in a general reorganization of Army Air Forces training units in the United States.

The squadron was reconstituted and activated in the reserve in 1947. It was mobilized in 1951 for the Korean War, but its personnel were used as fillers for other units and the squadron was inactivated. It was briefly activated in the reserves again in 1957, but was inactivated when the reserves converted to a troop carrier mission.

== History ==
=== World War II ===
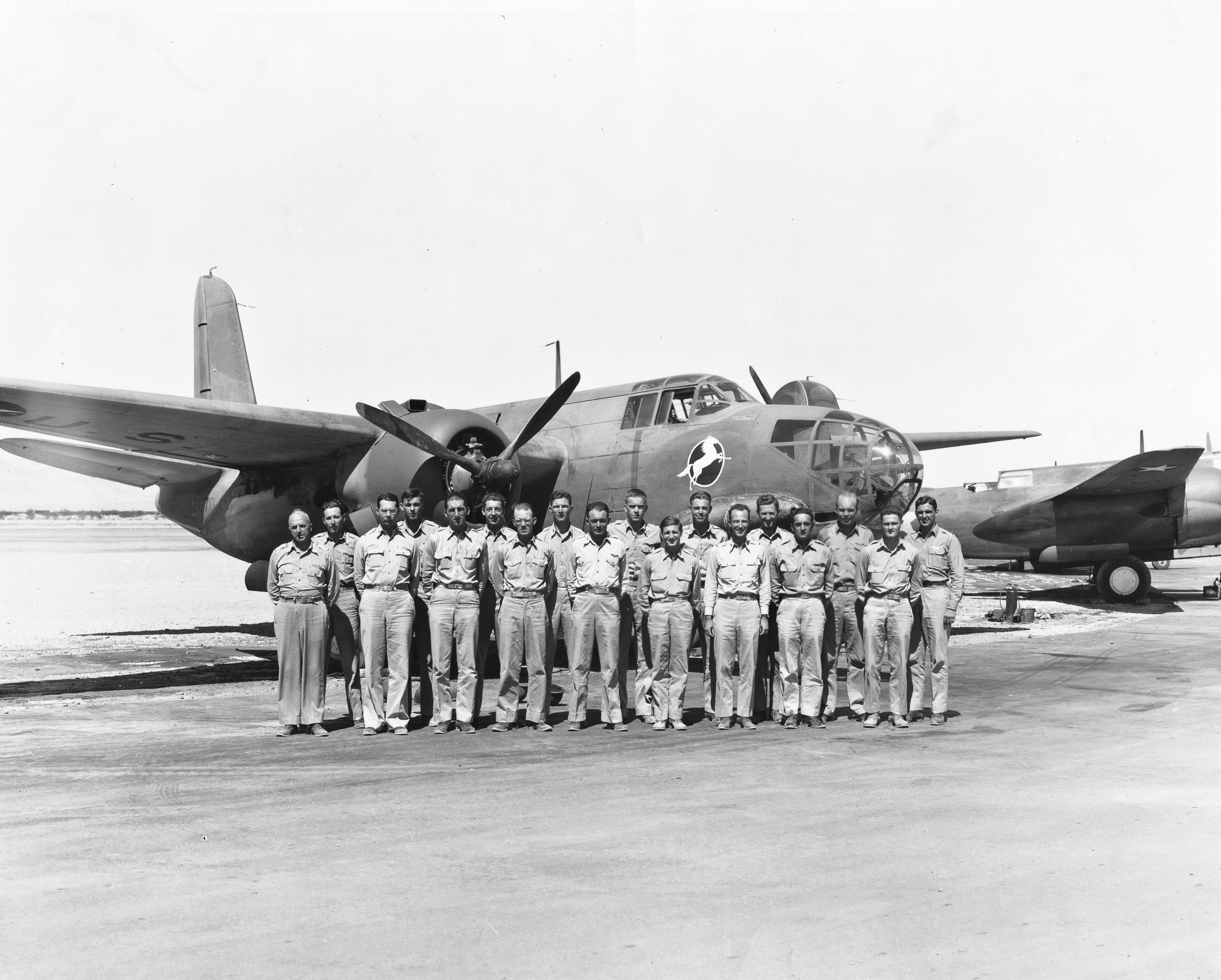
46th Bombardment Group Douglas A-20 at Blythe Army Air Bsae

The squadron was activated as the 50th Bombardment Squadron at Hunter Field, Georgia in the United States Army Air Corps' buildup before World War II. It was one of the original squadrons of the 46th Bombardment Group and was equipped with Douglas A-20 Havoc aircraft. The 50th trained with the Havoc and participated in maneuvers. After the entry of the United States into the war, the squadron moved to Barksdale Field, Louisiana, and then to Galveston Army Air Field, Texas, from which it flew anti-submarine warfare patrol and search missions over the Gulf of Mexico until May 1942.

It moved to Blythe Army Air Base, California, where it participated in desert maneuvers. It then served as an Operational Training Unit (OTU) at Will Rogers Field, Oklahoma. The OTU program was patterned after the unit training system of the Royal Air Force and involved the use of an oversized parent unit to provide cadres to "satellite groups" It then assumed responsibility for their training and oversaw their expansion with graduates of Army Air Forces Training Command schools to become effective combat units. Phase I training concentrated on individual training in crewmember specialties. Phase II training emphasized the coordination for the crew to act as a team. The final phase concentrated on operation as a unit.

In late 1943 the squadron moved to Morris Field, North Carolina, where it became a Replacement Training Unit, concentrating on training of individual pilots and aircrews. Just before disbanding, the squadron began to convert to North American B-25 Mitchells.

However the Army Air Forces was finding standard military units, based on relatively inflexible tables of organization, were not well adapted to the training mission. Accordingly, it adopted a more functional system in which each base was organized into a separate numbered unit. In May 1944, the squadron was disbanded and its personnel, equipment and functions transferred to the 333d AAF Base Unit (Replacement Training Unit, Light Bombardment)

=== Air Force reserve ===
==== Initial activation and mobilization for the Korean War ====
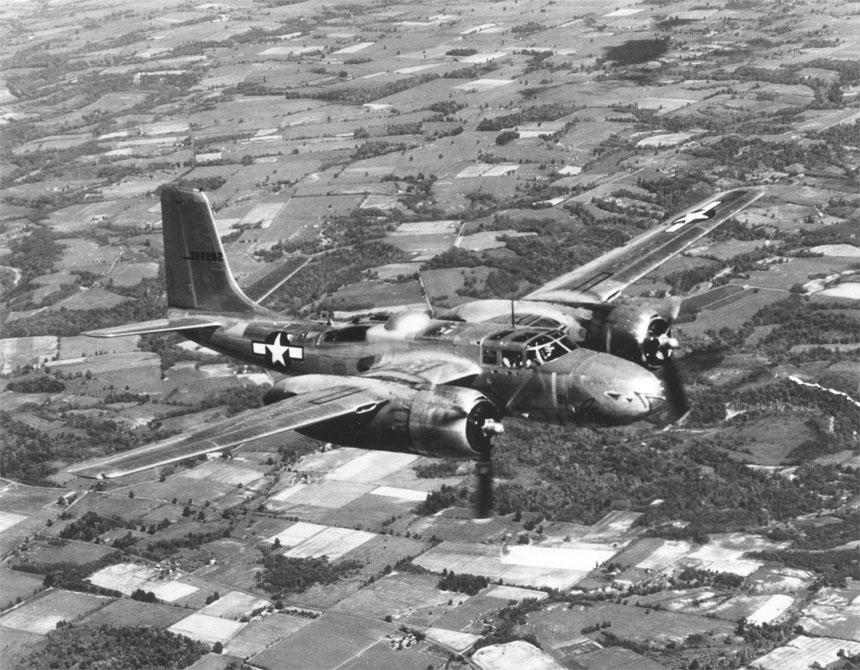
A-26 Invader in flight

The squadron was reconstituted and activated in the reserve under Air Defense Command (ADC) at Mitchel Field, New York in April 1947 and assigned to the 319th Bombardment Group. At Mitchel, the squadron trained under the supervision of the 113th AAF Base Unit (later the 2230 Air Force Reserve Training Center), although it is not clear whether it was fully manned or equipped during this period. In July 1948 Continental Air Command (ConAC) assumed responsibility for managing reserve and Air National Guard units from ADC. The 50th's stay at Mitchel ended when ConAC reorganized its reserve units under the wing base organization system in June 1949.

The squadron moved on paper to Reading Municipal Airport, Pennsylvania, where it replaced elements of the 322d Bombardment Group. At Reading, the squadron trained under the supervision of the 2237th Air Force Reserve Training Center. The squadron was authorized manning of only 25% of normal strength. Runway length at Reading, however, led ConAC to decide to station a troop carrier unit there, and the squadron was inactivated on 2 October 1949 and its personnel were transferred to the 327th Troop Carrier Squadron.

The squadron activated again about a month later, on 10 October 1949, at Birmingham Municipal Airport, Alabama, where it replaced the 336th Troop Carrier Squadron. The squadron flew the Douglas B-26 Invader at Birmingham, where training was conducted by the 2587th Air Force Reserve Training Center. All reserve combat and corollary units were mobilized for the Korean war, and the 319th was called up on 10 March 1951. Its personnel and aircraft were used as fillers for other units, and the squadron was inactivated on 22 March.

==== Fighter operations ====
The squadron was activated in June 1957 at New Orleans Naval Air Station, Louisiana as the 50th Fighter-Bomber Squadron. The squadron was not located with its parent wing, which was at Memphis Municipal Airport, Tennessee, under what was called the Detached Squadron Concept. The concept had been adopted by ConAC because communities were more likely to accept smaller squadrons than large wings and the location of separated squadrons would facilitate recruiting and manning. The squadron began to receive North American F-86 Sabres. However, the Air Force directed ConAC to convert three reserve fighter bomber wings to the troop carrier mission by September 1957. In addition, within the Air Staff was a recommendation that the reserve fighter mission given to the Air National Guard and replaced by the troop carrier mission. The 50th Squadron was inactivated in this mission change on 16 November 1957 and its place was taken by the 77th Troop Carrier Squadron.

== Lineage ==
- Constituted as the 50th Bombardment Squadron (Light) on 20 November 1940

Activated on 15 January 1941
Disbanded on 1 May 1944

- Reconstituted on 10 March 1947

Activated in the reserve on 16 April 1947
Inactivated on 2 September 1949

- Activated in the reserve on 10 October 1949

Ordered to active service on 10 March 1951
Inactivated on 22 March 1951

- Redesignated 50th Fighter-Bomber Squadron on 12 February 1957

Activated in the reserve 8 June 1957
Inactivated on 16 November 1957

=== Assignments ===
- 46th Bombardment Group, 15 January 1941 – 1 May 1944
- 319th Bombardment Group, 16 April 1947 – 2 September 1949
- 319th Bombardment Group, 10 October 1949 – 22 March 1951
- 319th Fighter-Bomber Group, 8 June–16 November 1957

=== Stations ===
- Hunter Field, Georgia, 15 January 1941
- Bowman Field, Kentucky, 19 May 1941
- Barksdale Field, Louisiana, 1 February 1942
- Galveston Army Air Field, Texas, 2 April 1942
- Blythe Army Air Base, California, 19 May 1942
- Will Rogers Field, Oklahoma, 7 November 1942
- Drew Field, Florida, 6 October 1943
- Morris Field, North Carolina, 6 November 1943 – 1 May 1944
- Mitchel Field, New York, 16 April 1947
- Reading Municipal Airport, Pennsylvania, 27 June 1949 – 2 September 1949
- Birmingham Municipal Airport, Alabama, 10 October 1949 – 22 March 1951
- New Orleans Naval Air Station, Louisiana, 8 June–16 November 1957

=== Aircraft ===
- Douglas A-20 Havoc, 1941–1944
- North American B-25 Mitchell, 1944
- Douglas B-26 Invader, 1949–1951
- North American F-86 Sabre, 1957

=== Campaign ===
Campaign Streamer	Campaign	Dates	Notes
	American Theater Antisubmarine	7 December 1941 – 17 May 1942	

== See also ==
- List of Douglas A-20 Havoc operators
- List of F-86 Sabre units
- List of United States Air Force fighter squadrons
