= 4721st Air Defense Group =

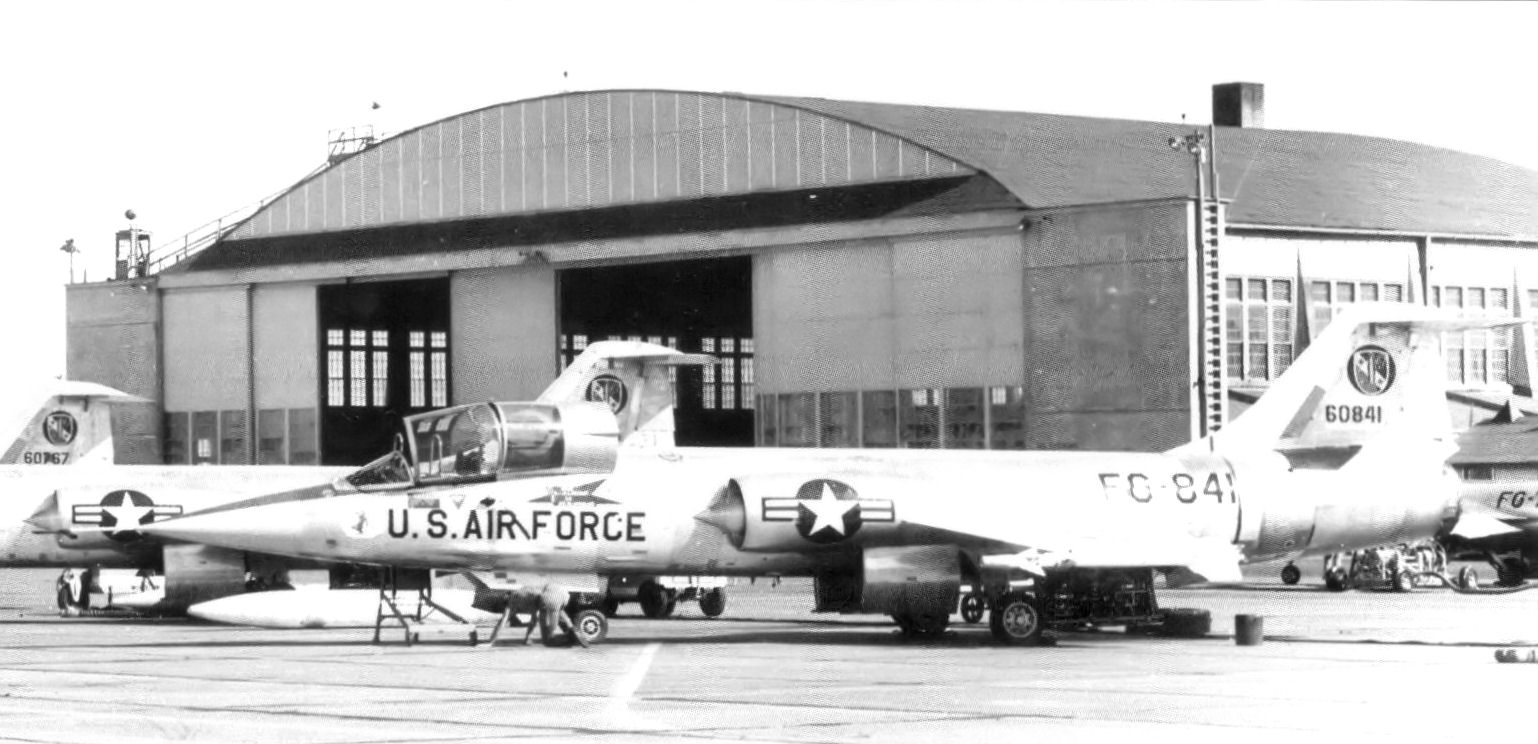
- 538th Fighter-Interceptor Squadron F-104 Starfighter at Larson Air Force Base (Note: Aircraft is Lockheed F-104A-25-LO Starfighter, serial 56-0841 in 1958. It crashed near Málaga, Spain on 7 December 1961.)
- Active: 1956–1959
- Country: United States
- Branch: United States Air Force
- Type: Fighter interceptor
- Role: Air defense

The 4721st Air Defense Group is a discontinued group of the United States Air Force. Its last assignment was with the 4700th Air Defense Wing at Larson Air Force Base, Washington, where it was last active in 1959.

The group was formed to provide a single command and support organization for the two fighter interceptor squadrons of Air Defense Command that were tenants at Larson, a Tactical Air Command base. It was discontinued after the 322d Fighter-Interceptor Squadron moved in 1959, leaving only a single fighter squadron at Larson.

== History ==
The 4721st Air Defense Group was organized in December 1956 at Larson Air Force Base, Washington to centralize supervision and support of the 322d and 538th Fighter-Interceptor Squadrons. Both squadrons were already stationed at Larson, flying radar equipped and Folding-Fin Aerial Rocket-armed North American F-86D Sabre interceptor aircraft, and assigned directly to the 9th Air Division. The 4721st was a tenant of Tactical Air Command (TAC)'s 62d Air Base Group, the host organization at Larson.

In July 1957, the base transferred from TAC to Military Air Transport Service, although the 62d Group remained the host unit. In the summer of 1957, both the 322d and 538th squadrons upgraded to later model Sabres equipped with data link to tie them directly into the Semi-Automatic Ground Environment command and control system. About June 1958, the 538th FIS converted to Lockheed F-104 Starfighters, armed with the M61 Vulcan 20mm rotary cannon and AIM-9 Sidewinder missiles.

In April 1959, the 322nd moved to Kingsley Field, Oregon and was reassigned out of the group as part of ADC's drawdown at Larson. The following month, the 4721st was discontinued and its remaining squadron, the 538th, was assigned directly to the 4700th Air Defense Wing.

== Lineage ==
- Designated as the 4721st Air Defense Group and organized on 1 December 1956

Discontinued on 1 May 1959

=== Assignments ===
- 9th Air Division, 1 December 1956
- 25th Air Division, 15 August 1958
- 4700th Air Defense Wing, 1 September 1958 – 1 May 1959

=== Components ===
- 322d Fighter-Interceptor Squadron, 1 December 1956 – 1 April 1959
- 538th Fighter-Interceptor Squadron, 1 December 1956 – 1 May 1959

=== Stations ===
- Larson Air Force Base, Washington, 1 December 1956 – 1 May 1959

=== Aircraft ===
- North American F-86D Sabre: 1956–1957
- North American F-86L Sabre: 1957–1959
- Lockheed F-104A Starfighter: 1958–1959

=== Commanders ===
- Col. Louis W. Ford, unknown – c. 30 June 1958
- Lt Col. John E. Gaffnery, c. 1 July 1958 – unknown

== See also ==
- List of United States Air Force Aerospace Defense Command Interceptor Squadrons
- List of Sabre and Fury units in the US military
- List of Lockheed F-104 Starfighter operators
