= New York Fighter Wing =

- Active: 1942–1944
- Country: United States
- Branch: United States Air Force
- Role: Fighter
- Engagements: World War II

Commanders
- Notable commanders: Brig General Earle E. Partridge

The New York Fighter Wing is an inactive United States Air Force unit. Its last assignment was with the I Fighter Command, stationed at Mitchel Field, New York It was inactivated on 10 April 1944.

The wing was a World War II air defense organization, reporting to First Air Force, responsible for the air defense of the New York City metropolitan area. The wing was also a training organization for fighter groups and personnel, with assigned groups subsequently deploying to overseas theaters.

== History ==
=== Lineage ===
- Constituted as New York Air Defense Wing on 6 August 1942

Activated on 11 August 1942
Redesignated New York Fighter Wing in July 1943
Inactivated on 10 April 1944, personnel reassigned to 164th Army Air Forces Base Unit (Fighter Control).
Disbanded on 8 October 1948.

=== Assignments ===
- I Fighter Command, 11 August 1942 – 10 April 1944

=== Components ===
- 56th Fighter Group: 11 August 1942 – 12 January 1943
- 58th Fighter Group: c. 3 March – 16 September 1943
- 80th Fighter Group: 11 August 1942 – 10 May 1943
- 348th Fighter Group: 30 September 1942 – 9 May 1943
- 352d Fighter Group: 1 October 1942 – June 1943
- 356th Fighter Group: 30 May – 4 July 1943
- 359th Fighter Group: 11 July – 23 August 1943
- 362d Fighter Group: 19 October – 12 November 1943
- 368th Fighter Group: 23 August – 20 December 1943
- 370th Fighter Group: 19 October 1943 – 20 January 1944
- 373d Fighter Group: 23 October 1943 – 15 March 1944
- 402d Fighter Group: 1–13 October 1943

=== Stations ===
- Mitchel Field, New York, 11 August 1942 – April 1946

== See also ==
- Roslyn Air National Guard Station 164th AAFBU.
