= 322d Fighter-Interceptor Squadron =

322d Fighter-Interceptor Squadron

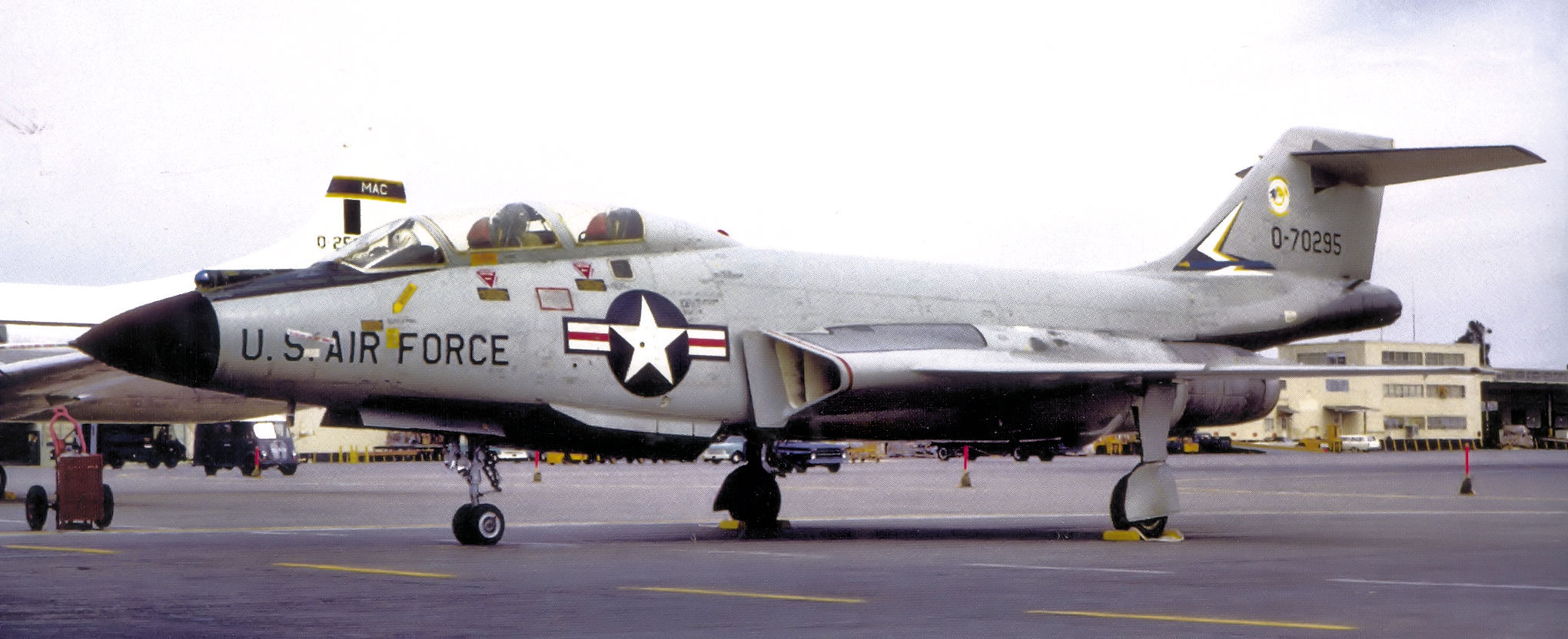
- 322d Fighter-Interceptor Squadron McDonnell F-101B Voodoo at Kingsley Field (Note: Photo taken August 1968. Plane is McDonnell F-101B-85-MC Voodoo Serial 57-295.)
- Active: 1942–1944; 1955–1968
- Country: United States
- Branch: United States Air Force
- Role: Fighter Interceptor
- Part of: Air Defense Command
- Motto: Ever Alert

Insignia
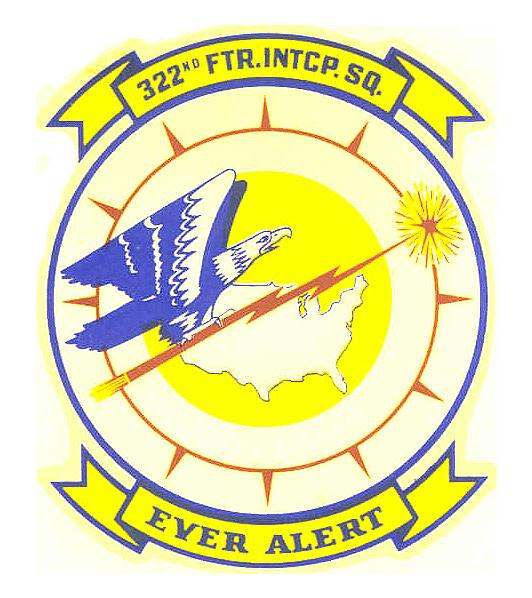
- 322d Fighter-Interceptor Squadron emblem (approved 31 May 1956)

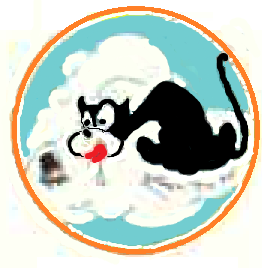
- 322d Fighter Squadron emblem

The 322d Fighter-Interceptor Squadron is an inactive United States Air Force unit. Its last assignment was with the 408th Fighter Group at Kingsley Field, Oregon, where it was inactivated on 1 July 1968.

The squadron was first activated during World War II as the 322d Fighter Squadron. It served as a training unit in the United States until 1944, when it was disbanded in a general reorganization of Army Air Forces training units. It was reactivated in 1955 as part of Project Arrow and served as a Cold War air defense unit until inactivated.

== History ==
=== World War II ===
The squadron was first activated as the 322d Fighter Squadron in the summer of 1942 as part of I Fighter Command. It flew early-model Republic P-47B Thunderbolts as part of the air defense of New York in the early part of World War II. It then became a P-47D Operational training unit (OTU) in New England. It was reassigned to III Fighter Command and moved to North Carolina in 1943 as a Replacement Training Unit (RTU). The squadron was disbanded in April 1944 as part of a reorganization of training units.

=== Cold War ===
The squadron was reconstituted as the 322d Fighter-Interceptor Squadron and reactivated in 1955 at Larson Air Force Base, Washington. The squadron assumed the mission, personnel and aircraft of the inactivating 31st Fighter-Interceptor Squadron as part of "Project Arrow", an Air Defense Command (ADC) program which was designed to bring back on the active list the fighter units which had compiled memorable records in the two world wars. The squadron was equipped with radar equipped and Mighty Mouse rocket armed North American F-86D Sabres. The squadron was upgraded to the North American F-86L, an improved version of the Sabre which incorporated the Semi Automatic Ground Environment computer-controlled direction system for intercepts. The service of the F-86L was quite brief, since by the time the last F-86L conversion was delivered, the type was already being phased out in favor of supersonic interceptors.

The squadron moved to Kingsley Field, Oregon in 1959 and was re-equipped with new McDonnell F-101B Voodoo supersonic interceptor, and the F-101F operational and conversion trainer. The two-seat trainer version was equipped with dual controls, but carried the same armament as the F-101B and was fully combat-capable. The 322d operated Voodoos until July 1968, when the aircraft were passed to the Air National Guard and the squadron was inactivated as part of the general reduction of the Air Defense Command active-duty interceptor force.

== Lineage ==
- Constituted as the 322d Fighter Squadron on 24 June 1942

Activated on 19 August 1942
Disbanded on 10 April 1944

- Reconstituted and redesignated 322d Fighter-Interceptor Squadron on 20 June 1955

Activated on 18 August 1955
Inactivated on 1 July 1968

=== Assignments ===
- 326th Fighter Group, 19 August 1942 – 10 April 1944
- 9th Air Division, 18 August 1955
- 4721st Air Defense Group, 1 December 1956
- 408th Fighter Group, 1 April 1959 – 1 July 1968

=== Stations ===
- Mitchel Field, New York, 19 August 1942
- Bradley Field, Connecticut, 1 September 1942
- Westover Field, Massachusetts, 1 November 1942
- Seymour Johnson Field, North Carolina, 13 October 1943 – 10 April 1944
- Larson Air Force Base, Washington, 18 August 1955
- Kingsley Field, Oregon, 1 April 1959 – 1 July 1968

=== Aircraft ===
- Republic P-47B Thunderbolt, 1942–1943
- Republic P-47D Thunderbolt, 1943–1944
- North American F-86D Sabre, 1955–1957
- North American F-86L Sabre, 1957–1959
- McDonnell F-101B Voodoo, 1959–1968
- McDonnell F-101F Voodoo, 1959–1968
