= 402nd Fighter-Day Group =

402d Fighter-Day Group
- Active: 1943–1943; 1943-1944; 1957
- Country: United States
- Branch: United States Air Force
- Role: Day Fighter

The 402d Fighter-Day Group is an inactive United States Air Force unit. Its last assignment was with Tactical Air Command, being inactivated at Greenville Air Force Base, Mississippi on 8 February 1957.

== History ==
=== World War II ===
The 402d Bombardment Group was activated in China and assigned to Fourteenth Air Force in early 1943. Programmed for North American B-25 Mitchell medium bombers, however no aircraft or squadrons were assigned and its headquarters apparently was never fully manned. The unit was disbanded a few months later.

The 402d Fighter Group was first activated by I Fighter Command in October 1943 at Westover Field, Massachusetts, with the 538th Fighter-Interceptor Squadron, 539th Fighter-Interceptor Squadron and 540th Fighter Squadrons assigned. Less than two weeks later, the group moved to Seymour Johnson Field, North Carolina. At Seymour Johnson, the 538th and 539th Squadrons were reassigned to the 326th Fighter Group, which transferred two of its squadrons to the 402d.

=== Cold War ===
The two World War II groups were reconstituted and consolidated as the 402d Fighter-Day Group and assigned to Tactical Air Command. Planned as an F-100 Super Sabre group, however decision was made to keep Greenville AFB as an Air Training Command base. As a result, no aircraft were assigned and the unit was inactivated in 1957.

== Lineage ==
402d Bombardment Group

- Constituted as the 402d Bombardment Group (Medium) on 20 April 1943

Activated on 19 May 1943
Disbanded on 31 July 1943

- Reconstituted and consolidated with the 402d Fighter Group on 3 October 1956

402d Fighter-Day Group

- Constituted as the 402d Fighter Group on 24 September 1943

Activated on 1 October 1943
Disbanded on 10 April 1944.

- Reconstituted as the 402d Fighter-Day Group on 4 October 1956

Activated on 15 October 1956
Inactivated on 8 February 1957

=== Assignments ===
- Fourteenth Air Force, 19 May – 31 July 1943
- I Fighter Command, 1 October 1943 – 10 April 1944 (attached to New York Fighter Wing until 13 October 1943)
- Tactical Air Command, 15 October 1956 – 8 February 1957

=== Components ===
- 320th Fighter (later Fighter-Day) Squadron: 25 November 1943 – 10 April 1944; 15 October 1956 – 8 February 1957
- 442d Fighter (later Fighter-Day) Squadron: 25 November 1943 – 10 April 1944; 15 October 1956 – 8 February 1957
- 452d Fighter Squadron: 1 October 1943 – 10 April 1944
- 538th Fighter Squadron: 1 October – 25 November 1943
- 539th Fighter Squadron: 1 October – 25 November 1943
- 540th Fighter (later Fighter-Day) Squadron: 1 October 1943 – 10 April 1944; 15 October 1956 – 8 February 1957

=== Stations ===
- Kunming Airport, China, 19 May – 31 July 1943
- Westover Field, Massachusetts, 1 October 1943
- Seymour Johnson Field, North Carolina, c. 13 October 1943
- Bluethenthal Field, North Carolina, c. 9 December 1943
- Bradley Field, Connecticut, c. 11 February – 10 April 1944
- Greenville Air Force Base, Mississippi, 15 October 1956 – 8 February 1957

=== Aircraft ===
- P-47 Thunderbolt, 1943–1944
