= I Fighter Command =

1941-1946 United States Army Air Forces operational command

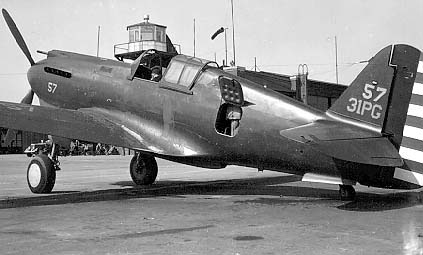
- P-40 Warhawk of the command's 31st Pursuit Group
- Active: 1941–1946
- Country: United States
- Branch: United States Army; United States Air Force
- Role: Air defense and training of fighter units
- Engagements: American Theater of World War II

Commanders
- Notable commanders: Glenn O. Barcus; John K. Cannon; Elwood R. Quesada

Insignia
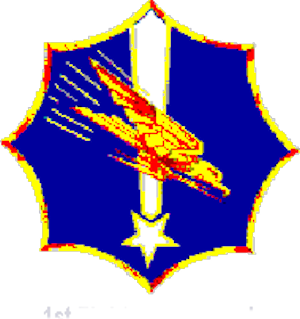
- I Fighter Command emblem (Note: Approved 11 June 1943.)

I Fighter Command was a United States Army Air Forces intermediate command responsible for command and control of the fighter operations within the First Air Force during World War II. It was initially established in June 1941 as the 1st Interceptor Command to provide air defense of the Northeastern United States. Following the attack on Pearl Harbor, the command's area of responsibility extended over the entire Atlantic coast and into Canada and Iceland. As the perceived threat of attack decreased, the command's responsibility for training units and aircrews became its primary mission. The command continued its mission until March 1946, when it was inactivated.

== History ==
=== Background ===
GHQ Air Force (GHQ AF) had been established with two major combat functions, to maintain a striking force against long range targets, and the air defense of the United States. In the spring of 1941, the War Department established four strategic defense areas and GHQ, AF reorganized its Northeast Air District as 1st Air Force with responsibility for air defense planning and organization along the eastern seaboard. Simultaneously, an Air Defense Command was established at Mitchel Field to plan the air defense of the United States and develop air defense doctrine. (Note: This command is not related to Air Defense Command established in March 1946. It was constituted on 26 February 1940 and activated on 1 March 1940 and assigned to First Army until March 1941, when it was assigned to GHQ AF.)

1st Air Force activated 1st Interceptor Command at Mitchel Field on 5 June 1941, under the command of Brigadier General John C. McDonnell, drawing its personnel from Air Defense Command, which inactivated three days earlier. The command's initial tactical components were the 6th and 7th Pursuit Wings

=== Air Defense ===
Shortly after the attack on Pearl Harbor, the command moved its headquarters to New York City. Here, as the importance of the North Atlantic supply line grew, it assumed responsibility for planning the air defense of Newfoundland and Nova Scotia. It selected radar sites in cooperation with Canadian authorities and worked to standardize aircraft warning procedures there. In June 1942, the command returned to Mitchel and would remain there until inactivated. The command dispatched the 33d Pursuit Squadron to provide air defense in Iceland in July. The command organized Detachment A to manage the 33rd, along with antiaircraft artillery and signal warning units involved in the air defense of Iceland.

The command was charged with control of "active agents" for air defense in its area of responsibility, which included interceptor aircraft, antiaircraft artillery and barrage balloons. Civilian organizations provided air raid warnings and enforced blackouts and came under the authority of the Office of Civilian Defense. Radar was initially not sufficiently developed to be included in air defense systems, There were only eight radars under construction to guard the Atlantic coast, but the command worked "feverishly" to create a ground observer corps and coastal radar net as elements of its Aircraft Warning Service. However, it soon became apparent that having two commands responsible for air defense in the Eastern Theater of Operations was impractical, and in early 1942, the command took over responsibility for air defense of the East and part of the Gulf coast. (Note: The area included Florida to as far west as the Apalachicola River. Southern Defense Command and 3d Interceptor Command retained responsibility for the remainder of the Gulf coast.)

Along the Atlantic coast, Eastern Defense Command established a "vital air defense zone", extending from the coast approximately 150 miles (240 km) inland and 200 miles (320 km) to sea, with long range bombers from 1st Bomber Command flying patrols over the ocean. However, 1st Bomber Command soon focused on antisubmarine warfare. Regional air defense wings were established in August 1942 at Boston, New York, Philadelphia, and Norfolk. The command's mission of fighter control later expanded to providing emergency flight services to other aircraft and assisting in air sea rescue.

=== Unit and crew training ===
In 1942, Air Force Combat Command had established an Operational Training Unit (OTU) system for 2nd and 3d Air Forces. The system was later extended to 1st Air Force. Although it was originally intended to confine the OTU system to 2d and 3rd Air Forces, too much of the AAF's aircrew and aircraft were assigned to 1st Air Force to permit the command to forego training responsibilities entirely. In May 1942, all pursuit groups assumed Operational Training Unit (OTU) responsibility. The command also trained fighter units and personnel. By the end of 1942, the command's training consisted almost entirely of OTUs. As units deployed overseas, the command's training mission shifted to training individuals in Replacement Training Units (RTU).

=== Inactivation ===
After the end of the war it was inactivated on 21 March 1946. After September 1947, all former Air Corps units were transferred to the United States Air Force, which disbanded the command in October 1948.

== Lineage ==
- Constituted as the 1st Interceptor Command on 26 May 1941 (Note: Maurer indicates unit was constituted as the "I" Interceptor Command. However, the unit was constituted and activated with an arabic number in its name. The use of roman numerals to designate Army Air Forces combat commands did not begin until September 1942.)

Activated on 5 June 1941
Redesignated 1st Fighter Command 15 May 1942
Redesignated I Fighter Command c. 18 September 1942
Inactivated on 21 March 1946
Disbanded on 8 October 1948

=== Assignments ===
- First Air Force, 26 May 1941 – 21 March 1946

=== Stations ===
- Mitchel Field, New York, 5 June 1941
- New York City, New York, 27 December 1941
- Mitchel Field, New York, 9 June 1942 – 21 March 1946

=== Components ===
Wings

- 3rd Air Defense Wing, 12 December 1942 – c. 7 February 1943
- 6th Pursuit Wing, 5 June 1941 – 7 December 1941
- 7th Pursuit Wing, 5 June 1941 – 31 August 1941
- 301st Fighter Wing: attached 15 October 1944 – 21 May 1945
- Boston Air Defense Wing (later Boston Fighter Wing): 11 August 1942 – 13 February 1945 (not manned after July 1944)
- New York Air Defense Wing (later New York Fighter Wing): 11 August 1942 – 3 April 1946 (not manned after July 1944)
- Norfolk Air Defense Wing (later Norfolk Fighter Wing): 11 August 1942 – 3 April 1946 (not manned after July 1944)
- Philadelphia Air Defense Wing (later Philadelphia Fighter Wing): 11 August 1942 – 3 April 1946 (not manned after July 1944)

Groups

- 8th Pursuit Group: 31 August 1941 – 6 March 1942
- 31st Pursuit Group: 1 October 1941 – 18 April 1942
- 33d Pursuit Group (later 33d Fighter Group): 2 October 1941 – 11 August 1942
- 52d Pursuit Group (later 52d Fighter Group): 1 October 1941 – c. 15 June 1942
- 56th Pursuit Group (later 56th Fighter Group): 15 January – 11 August 1942
- 57th Pursuit Group (later 57th Fighter Group): 1 September 1941 – c. 16 July 1942
- 58th Fighter Group: 17 October 1942 – 19 November 1943
- 79th Fighter Group: 22 June – November 1942
- 80th Fighter Group: 4 July – 11 August 1942
- 325th Fighter Group: 3–11 August 1942
- 355th Fighter Group: 18 February – c. 6 July 1943
- 366th Fighter Group: 1 June 1943 – 8 January 1944 (attached to Philadelphia Air Defense Wing to 20 November 1943)

Squadrons

- 52nd Interceptor Control Squadron: c. 30 November 1941 – c. 1 January 1942
- 90th Fighter Control Squadron: 15 March 1943 – 10 April 1944
- 91st Fighter Control Squadron: 15 March 1943 – 10 April 1944
- 92nd Fighter Control Squadron: 1 April 1943 – 10 April 1944
- 93rd Fighter Control Squadron: c. 1 June 1943 – 10 April 1944, 1 October 1944 – 31 March 1945
- 94th Fighter Control Squadron: 1 April 1943 – 10 April 1944, 1 October 1944 – March 1945
- 95th Fighter Control Squadron: 1 April 1943 – c. 31 March 1944
- 96th Fighter Control Squadron: 15 May 1943 – 1944
- 302nd Fighter Control Squadron: 20 January 1944 – c. 31 March 1944
- 305th Fighter Control Squadron: 1 April – 19 December 1943
- 321st Fighter Control Squadron: 15 May 1943 – 8 January 1944
- 325th Fighter Control Squadron: 1 April – c. 15 December 1943
- 403d Fighter Squadron: 7 August – 15 December 1943
- 453d Fighter Squadron: 20 November – 1 December 1943

Aircraft warning units

- Signal Aircraft Warning Service, 1 Interceptor Command (later Signal Aircraft Warning Service, I Fighter Command: c. 30 November 1941 – c. 1 May 1944
- 502nd Signal Regiment (Aircraft Warning): c. 15 December 1941 – January 1942

Base units

- 102nd AAF Base Unit (Headquarters, I Fighter Command): c 10 April 1944 – 21 March 1946
- 103rd AAF Base Unit (Boston Fighter Wing): c 10 April 1944 – c. 31 July 1944
- 104th AAF Base Unit (New York Fighter Wing): c 10 April 1944 – c. 31 July 1944
- 105th AAF Base Unit (Philadelphia Fighter Wing): c 10 April 1944 – c. 31 July 1944
- 106th AAF Base Unit (Norfolk Fighter Wing): c 10 April 1944 – c. 31 July 1944
- 160th AAF Base Unit (Fighter Control) 10 April 1944 – 15 November 1945
- 161st AAF Base Unit (Fighter Control) 10 April 1944 – c. 1 September 1945
- 162nd AAF Base Unit (Fighter Control) 10 April 1944 – c. 31 July 1944
- 163rd AAF Base Unit (Fighter Control) 10 April 1944 – c. 30 June 1944
- 164th AAF Base Unit (Fighter Control) 10 April 1944 – c. 1 December 1945
- 165th AAF Base Unit (Fighter Control) 10 April 1944 – c. 23 October 1944

=== Campaign ===
Campaign Streamer	Campaign	Dates	Notes
	American Theater without inscription	7 December 1941 – 2 March 1946	1st Interceptor Command (later I Fighter Command)
