= 111th Attack Squadron =

111th Attack Squadron

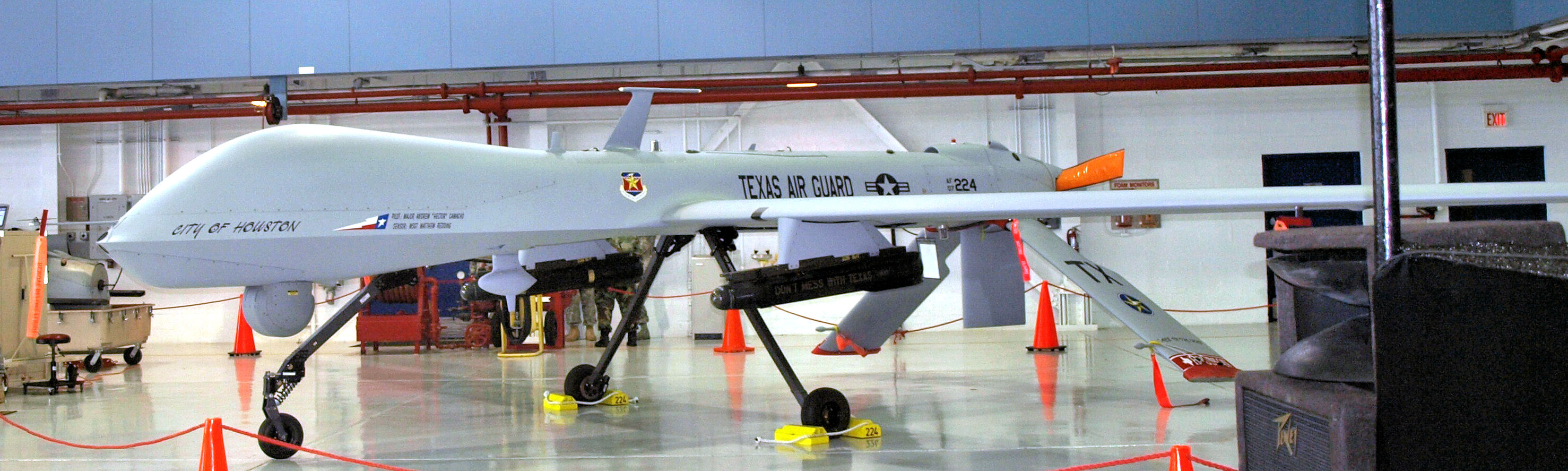
- 111th Attack Squadron MQ-1B Predator
- Active: 1917–1919; 1923–1945; 1947–1952; 1952–present
- Country: United States
- Allegiance: Texas
- Branch: Air National Guard
- Type: Squadron
- Role: Attack/ISR
- Part of: Texas Air National Guard
- Garrison/HQ: Ellington Field Joint Reserve Base, Texas
- Nickname: The Ace in the Hole Squadron
- Engagements: World War I Mediterranean Theater of Operations; Korean War; War on terror
- Decorations: Distinguished Unit Citation French Croix de Guerre with Palm

Insignia
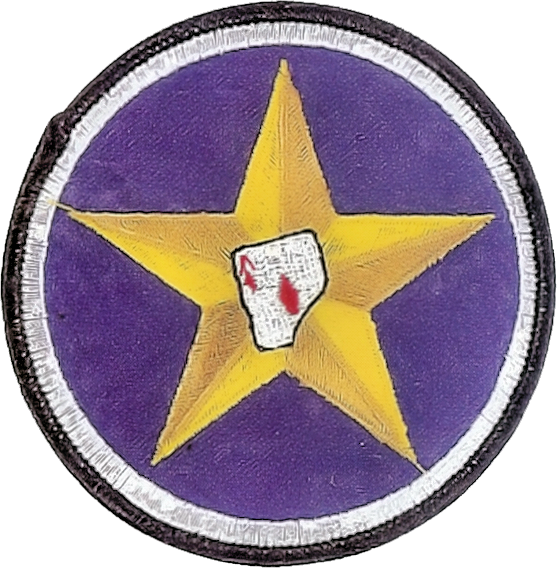
- 111th Attack Squadron emblem
- Tail code: EF (1996–2008)'TX' (2008–present)

The 111th Attack Squadron is a unit of the Texas Air National Guard 147th Attack Wing located at Ellington Field Joint Reserve Base, Texas. The 111th is equipped with the General Atomics MQ-9 Reaper unmanned aerial vehicle.

The squadron is a descendant organization of the World War I 111th Aero Squadron, established on 14 August 1917. It was reformed on 29 June 1923, as the 111th Observation Squadron, and is one of the 29 original National Guard Observation Squadrons of the United States Army National Guard formed before World War II.

The 111th Attack Squadron is the oldest unit of the Texas Air National Guard, with over 95 years of service to the State of Texas and the United States.

== History ==
=== World War I ===
The Texas Air National Guard began as the 111th Aero Squadron on 14 August 1917 at Kelly Field in San Antonio, TX. The unit, composed of teamsters and laborers, was on special duty at Kelly Field and was known as the "Post Headquarters Squadron." The squadron was demobilized 19 August 1919.

=== Texas National Guard ===
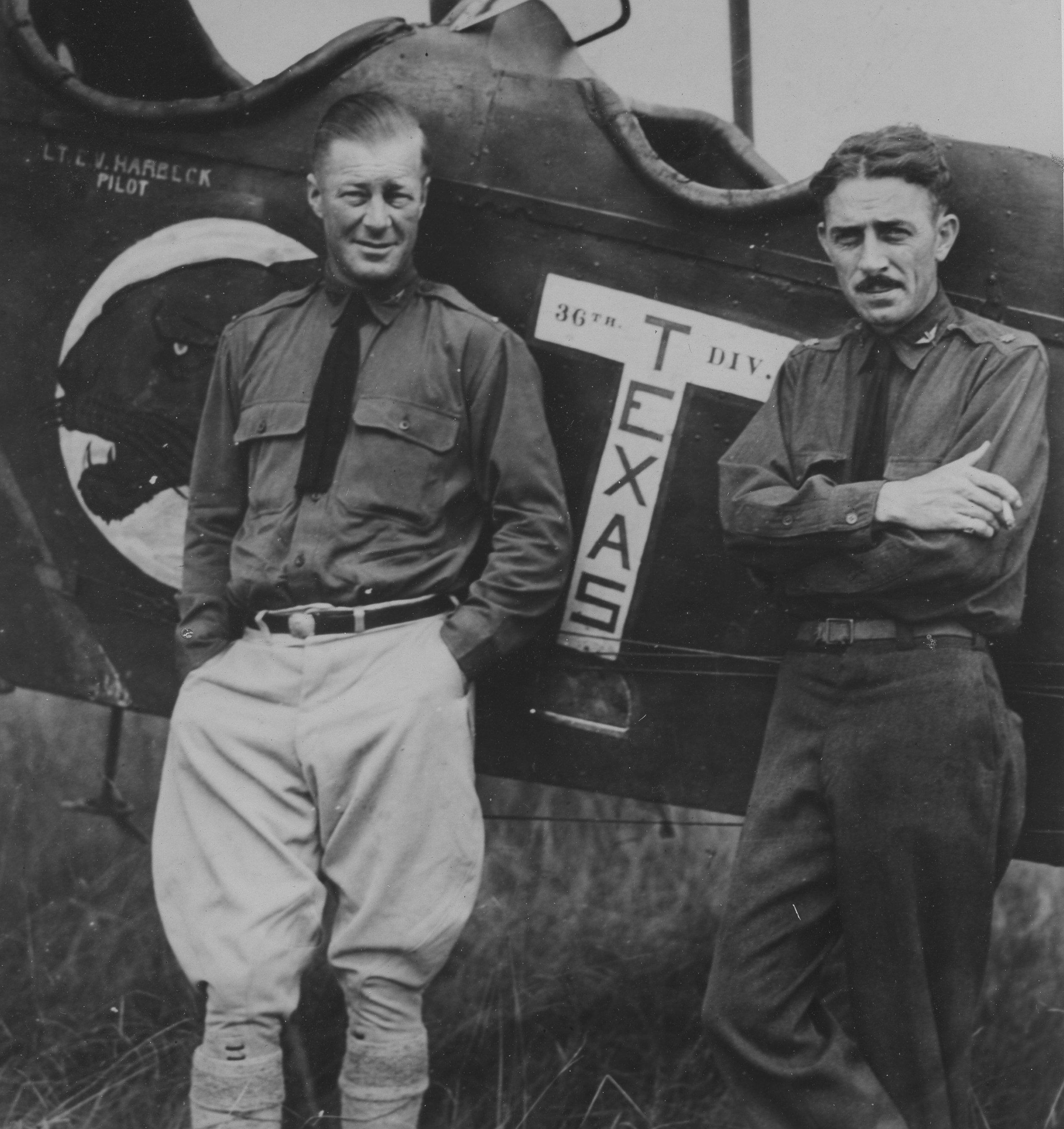
Lt. Walter Reed, unit active duty instructor (left) and Major Bernard Law, first commander (right) by the instructor's DH-4B in the summer of 1926

The unit was reorganized with the establishment of a permanent air service in 1920, forming in the old Houston Light Guard Armory. The 111th Observation Squadron received Federal Recognition on 29 June 1923, as part of the 36th Division, Texas National Guard.

The squadron had no airplanes, so the hot summer of 1923 was devoted to close order drill and classroom sessions. That was remedied, however, in September of that year when the 111th became airborne in the Curtiss JN-6H Jenny.

In September 1927 the Curtiss JN-6Hs were retired and the squadron gained Consolidated PT-1s and several other trainers until June 1928 when new Douglas O-2H observation aircraft arrived. During the next 10 years, the 111th performed outstanding civic service to the State of Texas, dropping medicine and relief supplies to many of the towns that were isolated by floodwaters, tornados, and fires. New Douglas O-38 observation planes were received in January 1931. By 1938 the squadron was flying both Douglas Douglas O-43As and North American O-47s.

=== World War II ===
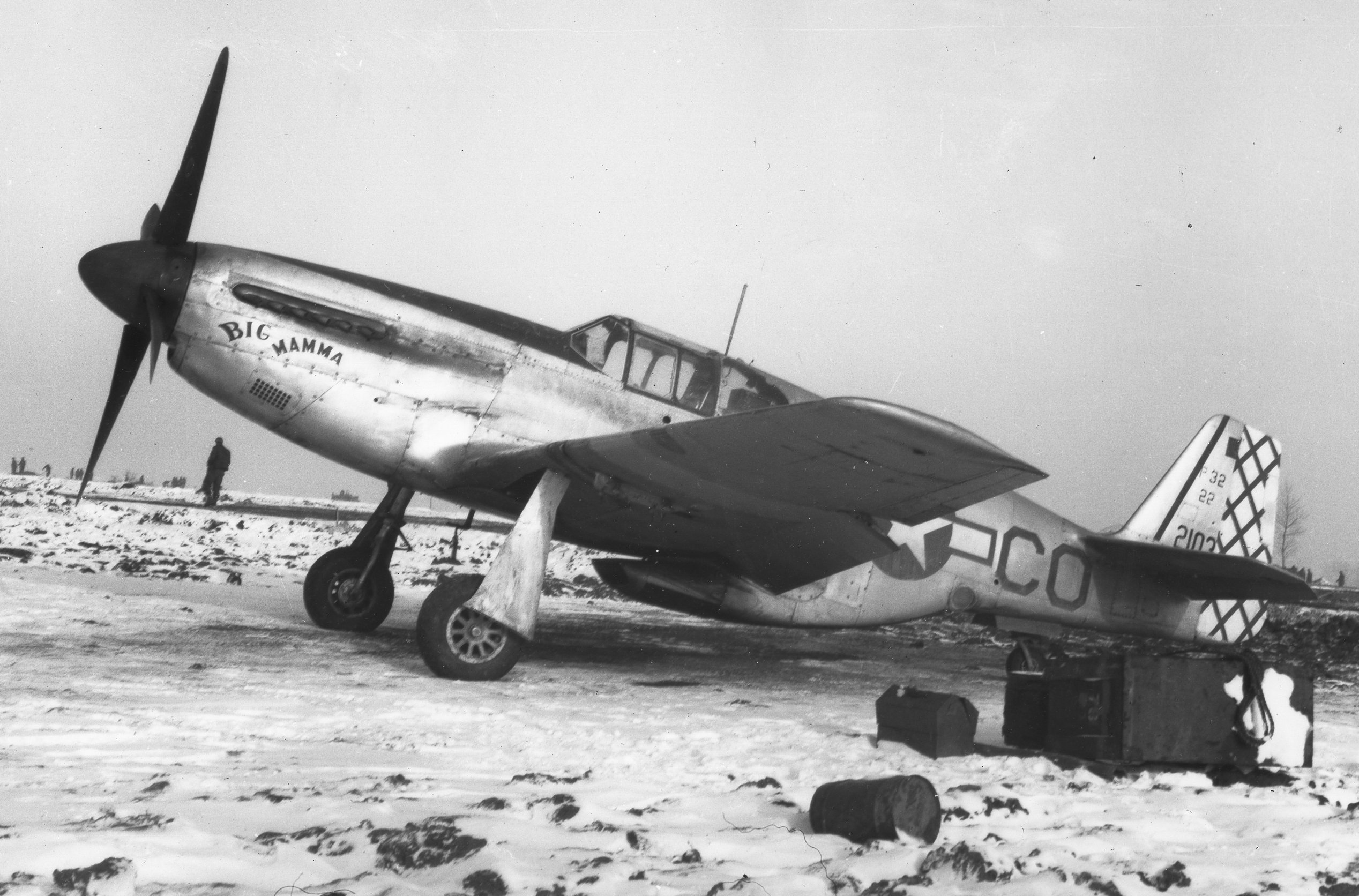
111th Tactical Recon Squadron (photo variant of P-51C) Northern France December 1944

With the onset of World War II, the unit was called into federal service 25 November 1940 and trained with the 36th Division at Brownwood Airfield Texas until Pearl Harbor was bombed, it was sent to the Mexican border, Fort Clark Springs Texas. The border patrol was short, and on 14 February 1942, the squadron left Texas for Daniel Field, Georgia and became part of the 68th Observation Group. Pilots trained on Douglas O-43A, Vultee/Stinson O-49/L-1 Vigilant and Douglas A-20B Havoc aircraft in preparation for deployment to the European Theater of Operations (ETO).

In 1942 the ground echelon and some pilots made their way to Scotland then England in preparation for landing on the Algerian beaches as part of Operation Torch, their shiny new P-39 Airacobras had to be assembled and tested before flying from England to Algeria. Some of the pilots of the 68th Group flew their A-20s directly across the Atlantic on the "Southern Route" and immediately began flying over the Mediterranean in anti-submarine patrols, sinking at least one submarine. As the invasion force moved inland, the three squadrons of the group divided up the A-20s and P-39s by squadron and the 111th took on the Fighter Reconnaissance role in the P-39.

In March 1943, the 111th left the 68th Group to defend against a possible invasion of French Morocco from Spanish Morocco while the rest of the group was selected to support the Tunisian Campaign of the Army's II Corps. In June 1943 the newly redesignated 111th Tactical Reconnaissance Squadron, flying Allison engined F-6A or F-6B Mustangs (taken from a British order of Mk IAs), became the eyes of the Seventh Army in Sicily, Operation Husky. They were temporarily assigned to the Fifth Army in Italy for the invasion of Salerno, "the 111th Fighter Reconnaissance Squadron had been trained to spot naval gunfire". They returned in July 1944 in time to support the Seventh Army's invasion of southern France, Operation Dragoon. In addition to the older F-6A/F-6B Mustangs, they began receiving F-6C Mustangs (the photographic reconnaissance version of the P-51C). The 111th remained with the Seventh Army through the end of the war. From VE Day until December 1945, the squadron served in the occupation force, and conducted postwar photo-mapping of the devastation in France.

During 23 months of continuous combat flying, from June 1943 through May 1945, the squadron flew 3,840 reconnaissance missions. While keeping army headquarters informed of enemy movements, the 111th destroyed 44 enemy aircraft, damaged 29 others and claimed 12 probable kills. The squadron received eight Battle Stars, a Distinguished Unit Citation, and the French Croix de Guerre for its World War II accomplishments.

=== Texas Air National Guard ===
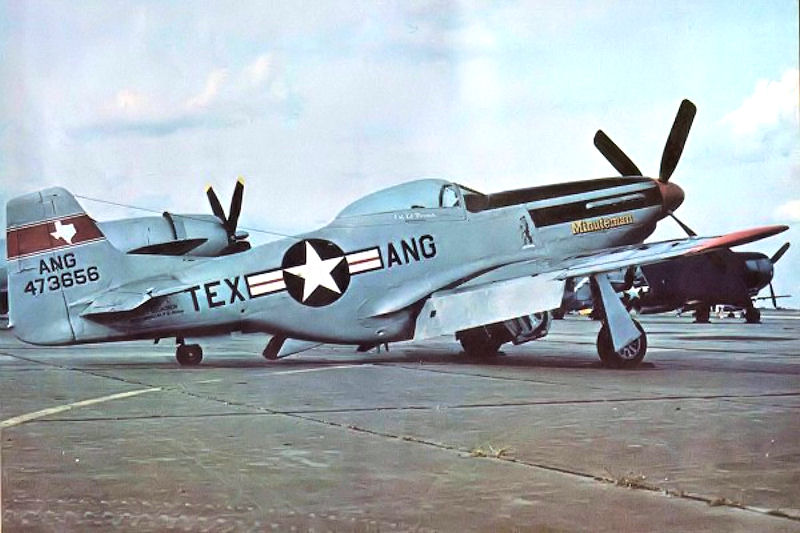
111th Fighter Squadron – North American F-51D-25-NA Mustang 44-73656

The 111th Tactical Reconnaissance Squadron was redesignated the '111th Fighter Squadron and allotted to the National Guard on 24 May 1946. It was organized ate Houston Municipal Airport and extended federal recognition on 27 January 1947. The 111th Fighter Squadron was assigned to the Texas Air National Guard 136th Fighter Group and was equipped with F-51D Mustangs.

The mission of the squadron was the air defense of Texas. During the postwar years, the 111th primarily trained over the southern and eastern parts of the state; the 181st Fighter Squadron, based at Love Field, Dallas, and covered the south east, and the 182d Fighter Squadron, based at Brooks Air Force Base, near San Antonio covered the Hill Country and west Texas.

==== Korean War activation ====
As a result of the Korean War, the Texas Air National Guard was federalized and placed on active-duty status on 10 October 1950, being assigned to Ninth Air Force, Tactical Air Command (TAC). TAC ordered the 136th Fighter Group to Langley Air Force Base, Virginia, where the unit was redesignated the 136th Fighter-Bomber Group. At Langley, the 136th Fighter-Bomber Wing consisted of the following units:

- 111th Fighter-Bomber Squadron
- 182d Fighter-Bomber Squadron
- 154th Fighter-Bomber Squadron (Arkansas ANG).

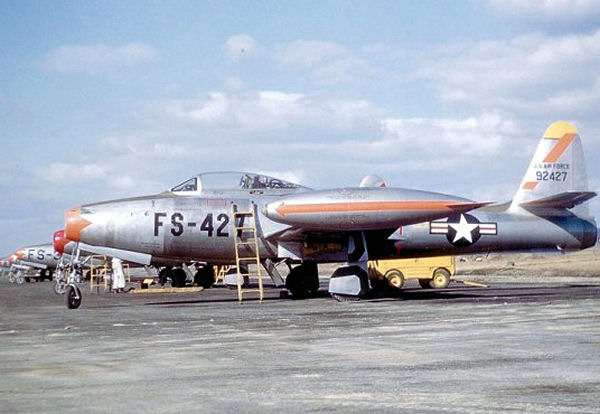
136th FBW F-84E Thunderjet at Taegu Air Force Base (K-2), South Korea

At Langley, the 136th trained with their F-51D Mustangs. Unfortunately losing two squadro pilots in a training accident on 15 December. A third pilot was killed on 27 January 1951 in another accident. In February 1951, the aged F-51Ds that the unit had been flying since its activation in 1947 were replaced by F-84E Thunderjets, and the squadron began transition training on the jet fighter-bomber. Most of the training took place at Langley, although some pilots were sent to Shaw Air Force Base, South Carolina. Maintenance crews, all new to jet aircraft, were trained at Langley and engine specialists were sent to the Allison plant in Indianapolis. Assigned to the Arkansas ANG 154th FBS at the time was a Navy exchange pilot, future NASA astronaut Lt. Walter Schirra (who happened to be the only pilot assigned to the 136th at the time who was a qualified jet pilot).

In May 1951, less than seven months later, the Wing was deployed to Japan, being attached to Far East Air Forces (FEAF)and stationed at Itazuke Air Force Base, the first echelon of the 136th arriving on 18 May. The 136th replaced the Strategic Air Command 27th Fighter-Escort Wing, which had deployed to FEAF in the early days of the Korean War. At Itazuke, the squadrons took over the F-84Es of the 27th, which remained in place. On 2 June, the final elements of the 136th arrived in Japan, the National Guardsmen officially relieved the 27th and the SAC airmen departed for the United States. The 136th was the first Air National Guard wing in history to enter combat.

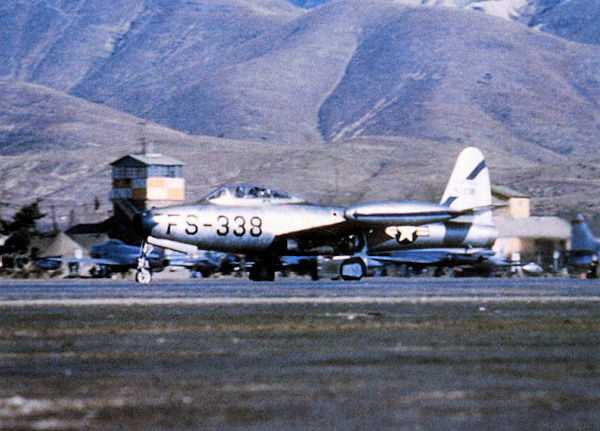
136th FBW F-84G taking off at K-2, South Korea

From Japan the Wing engaged in combat operations over South Korea, however flying in the North Pacific area was a challenge to the wing, losing seven F-84Es in non-combat operations and three in combat. On 26 June, in one of the largest air-to-air battles in Korea, two 182d FBS pilots, Captain Harry Underwood and 1st LT Arthur Olighter shot down an enemy MiG-15 that broke through an F-86 Sabre escort of four B-29s. Two other 111th pilots, 1st Lt John Morse and John Marlins scored probables in the same encounter. These were the first combat victories by Air National Guard pilots. On 3 July the 136th sent their aircraft to North Korea, attacking Flak batteries in downtown Pyongyang while other aircraft attacked North Korean airfields.

However, the short-legged F-84 had limited combat time over Korea, therefore on 16 November 1951 the Wing moved to Taegu Air Force Base (K-2) in South Korea for its combat operations. In 1952, the 136th was re-equipped with the F-84G Thunderjet, designed for tactical close air support of ground forces.

The squadron flew over 6,000 escort, interdiction, and close air support sorties for the United Nations Troops and 111th Fighter-Bomber Squadron pilots destroyed at least two Mikoyan-Gurevich MiG-15 fighter jets.

The 111th Fighter-Bomber Squadron returned to the Houston Municipal Airport without aircraft or personnel in July 1952 and began to rebuild. In July 1956 the F-80 Shooting Stars of the 111thr Squadron went on "Dawn to Dusk" alert at the Houston Municipal Airport.

==== Air Defense Command ====
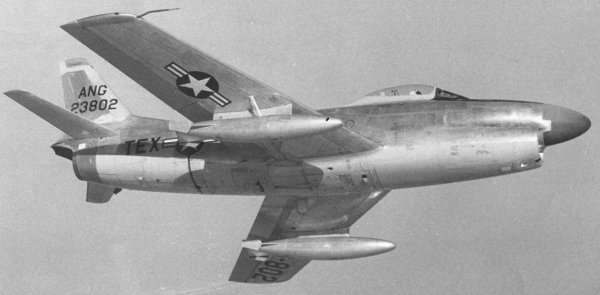
F-86D Sabre Texas Air National Guard

With the 111th's return from the Korean War, the 111th was re-equipped with the very long range F-51H Mustang, which had been developed to escort B-29 Superfortress bombers in the Pacific Theater from the Mariana Islands to the Japanese Home Islands. The F-51H would allow the squadron to intercept any unidentified aircraft over any part of Texas. The squadron became part of Air Defense Command (ADC) and resumed its postwar mission of Texas air defense.

It wasn't until 1955 that the squadron received jets from ADC, receiving F-80B and F-80C Shooting Stars and being redesignated as the 111th Fighter-Interceptor Squadron. The 111th received F-80C-11 (modified F-80A to F-80C standards) Shooting Stars on 1 July 1955, and on 1 July 1956 the 111th commenced to participate in the active ADC runway alert program at Ellington Air Force Base.

With the squadron's conversion from the obsolescent F-80-day fighters to the all-weather/day/night F-86D Sabre Interceptor in 1957, plans were made to reorganize the 600-man Augmented Squadron to an ADC group structure. On 1 July 1957, the 111th was authorized to expand to a group level, and the 147th Fighter-Interceptor Group was established]. The 111th became the group's flying squadron. Other elements assigned into the group were the 147th group headquarters, 147th Material Squadron (maintenance and supply), 147th Air Base Squadron, and the 147th USAF Dispensary. In June 1959 the squadron traded their F-86Ds for the upgraded F-86L Sabres with uprated afterburning engines and new electronics.

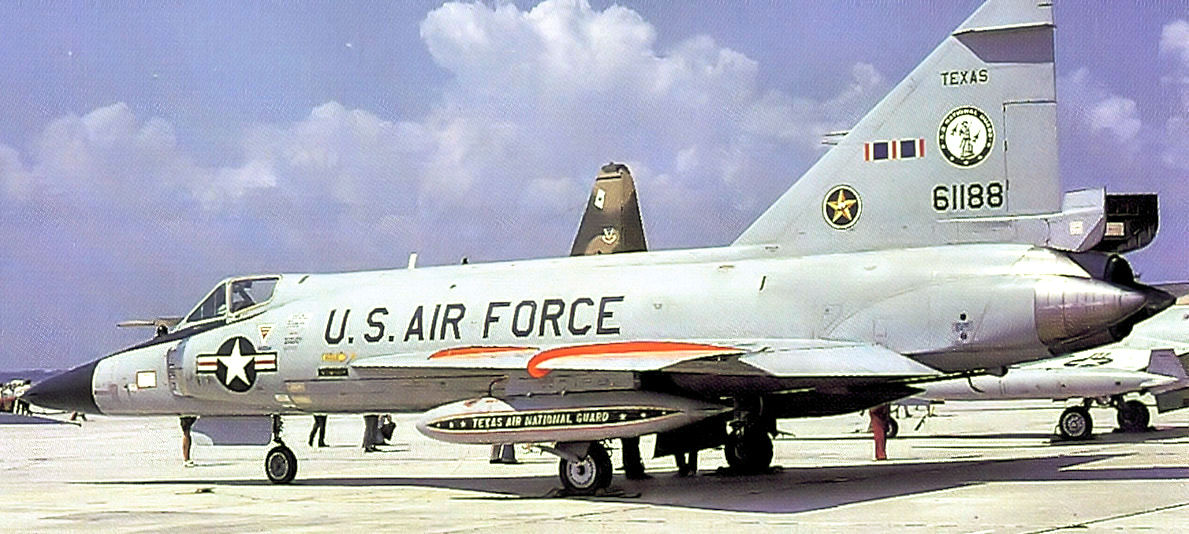
111th Fighter Interceptor Squadron Convair F-102A-65-CO Delta Dagger 56-1188

In August 1960 the unit became one of the first to transition to the F-102A Delta Dagger Mach-2 all-weather interceptor and began a 24-hour alert to guard the Texas Gulf coast. On 1 January 1970, the squadron was redesignated as the 111th Combat Crew Training Squadron and served as the Air National Guard's RTU (Replacement Training Unit) for the TF/F-102A. In 1971, when the active duty force ceased F-102A training and closed Perrin Air Force Base, Texas on 30 June 1971, the Houston-based 111th FIS became the Replacement Training Unit (RTU) for all Air Defense Command F-102 pilots, and the squadron received several TF-102A dual-seat trainers which were transferred from Perrin AFB while also retaining the T-33A instrument training function.

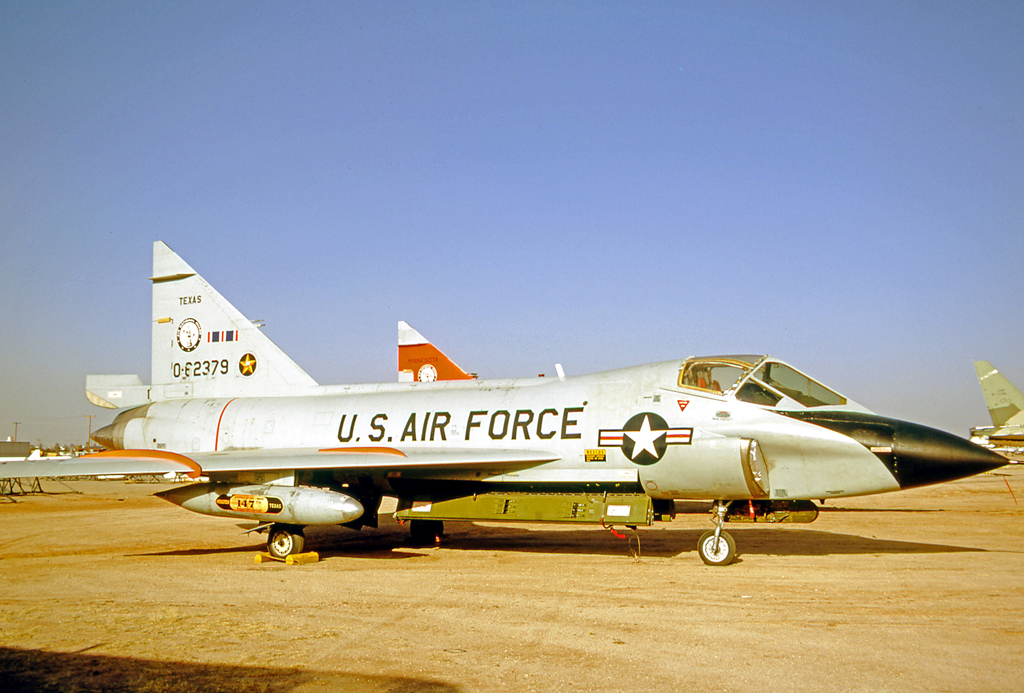
Convair TF-102A twin-seat trainer of 111 FIS Texas ANG in 1971

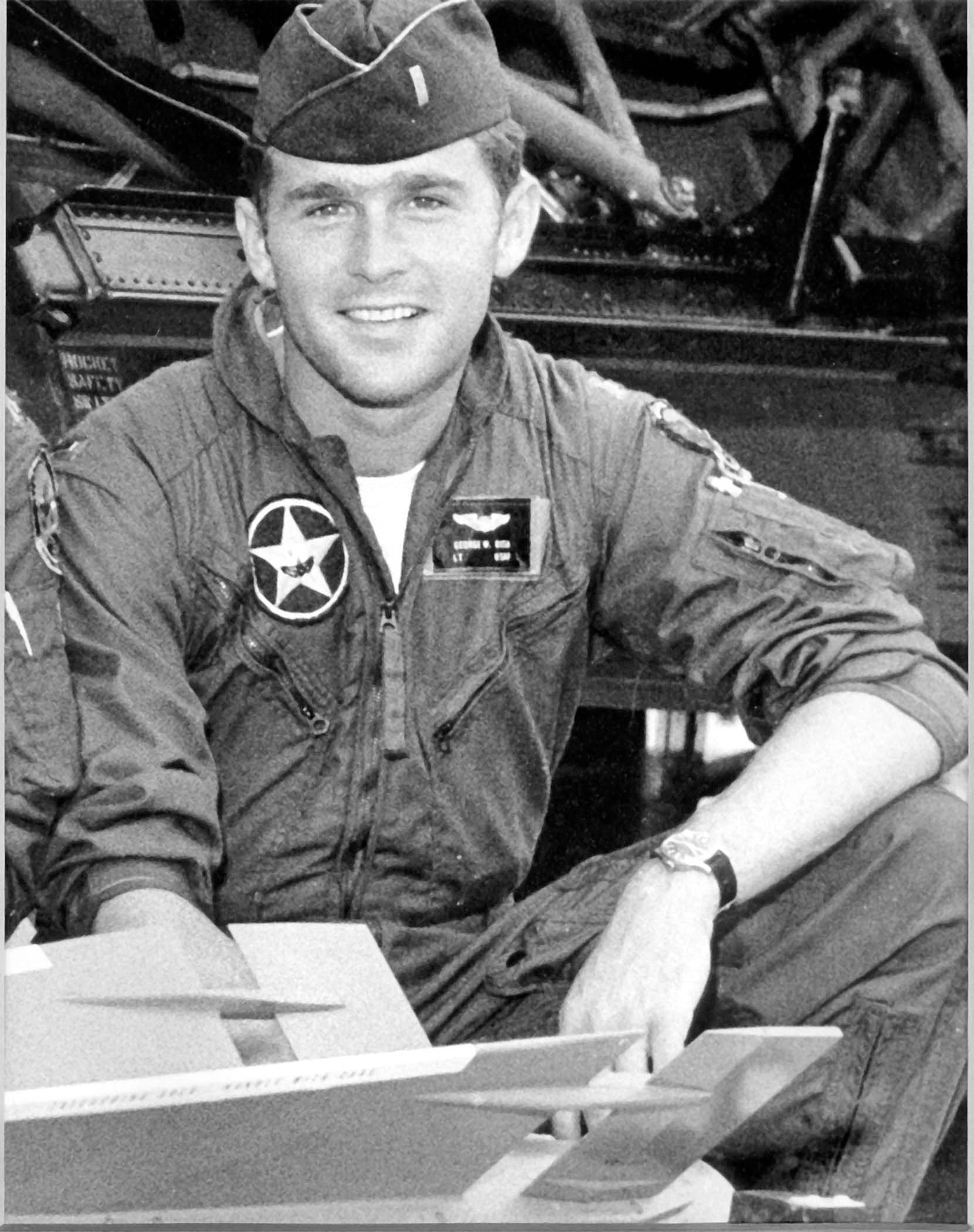
Future Governor of Texas and President of the United States 1Lt. George W. Bush, as a squadron member, 1970

One pilot who flew TF/F-102As with the 111th was 1st Lt. George W. Bush, a future Governor of Texas and future President of the United States. George W. Bush's military service began in 1968 when he enlisted in the Texas Air National Guard after graduating with a bachelor's degree in history from Yale University. After being accepted into the ANG, Airman Basic Bush was selected to attend pilot training even though his test scores were the lowest acceptable for that position. His six weeks of basic training was completed at Lackland Air Force Base in Texas during July and August 1968. Upon its completion, Bush was promoted to the officer's rank of second lieutenant required for pilot candidates. He spent the next year in flight school at Moody AFB in Georgia from November 1968 to November 1969. Bush then returned to Ellington AFB in Texas to complete seven months of combat crew training on the F-102 from December 1969 to June 1970. This period included five weeks of training on the T-33 Shooting Star and 16 weeks aboard the TF-102A Delta Dagger two-seat trainer and finally the single-seat F-102A. Bush graduated from the training program in June 1970. Lt. Bush remained in the Texas ANG as a certified F-102 pilot who participated in frequent drills and alerts through April 1972. Lt. Bush was honorably discharged from the Air National Guard in October 1973 at the rank of First Lieutenant. An ANG physical dated 15 May 1971 indicates that he had logged 625 flight hours by that time, and he ultimately completed 326 hours as pilot and 10 as co-pilot while serving with the 111th Fighter-Interceptor Squadron.

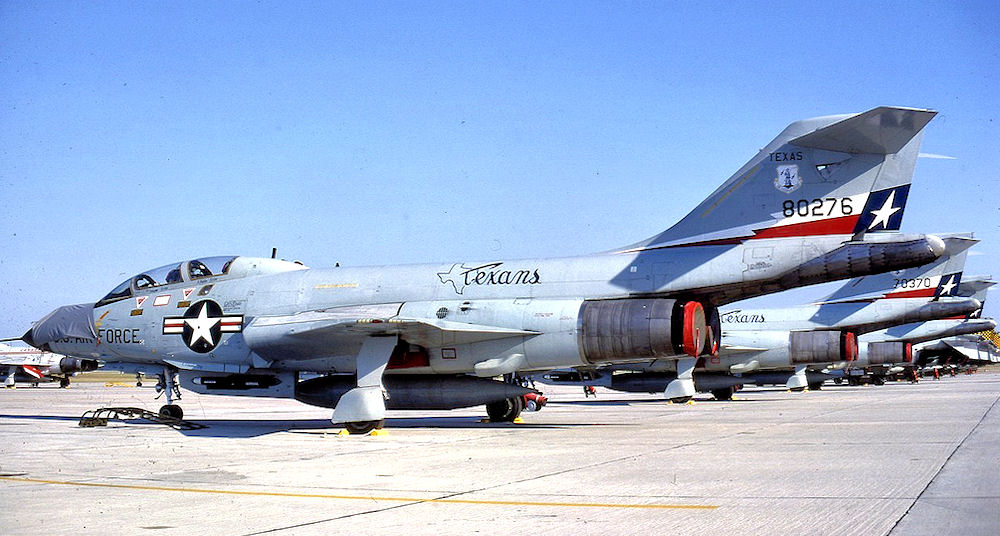
111th Combat Crew Training Squadron F-101F Voodoo trainer 58-0276, about 1975

In May 1971, the 111th added F-101B/F Voodoos and became the RTU tar the twin seat F-101F type, while continuing as the F-102 Delta Dagger RTU. In January 1975, after 14 years of service, the unit's F-102s were retired, but the unit maintained a full fleet of F-101s.

The 111th also operated detachment 1 of the 147th Wing at New Orleans. The detachment was apart from the squadron in that it maintained constant alert status while facing towards Cuba.

==== Tactical Air Command ====
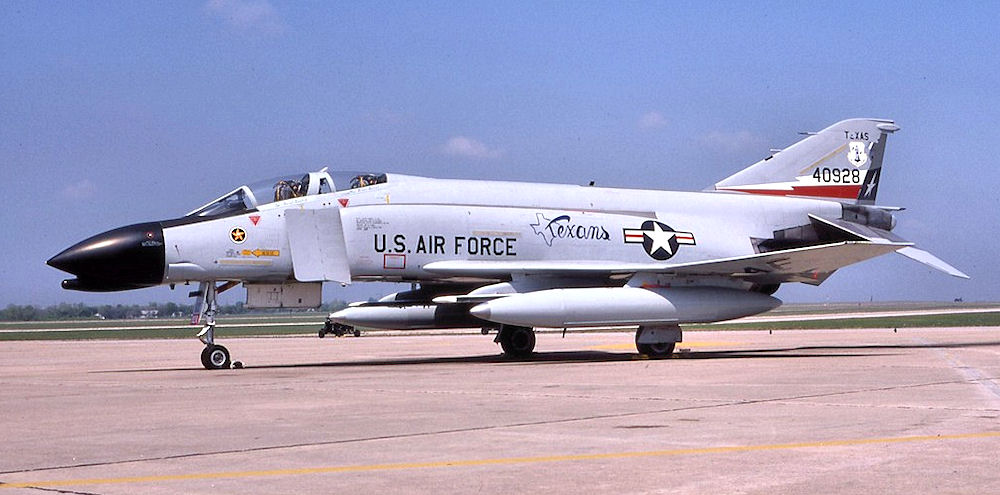
111th FIS F-4C 64-0928 in Air Defense colors, about 1985

In October 1979, in as part of the inactivation of Aerospace Defense Command, the USAF gained command responsibilities which shifted to Tactical Air Command (TAC) and an organization equivalent to a numbered air force designated as Air Defense, Tactical Air Command (ADTAC). In 1982, the F-101s were retired and ADTAC re-equipped the 111th with the McDonnell F-4C Phantom II and continued its air defense mission. Most of the F-4Cs the squadron received were Vietnam War veteran aircraft. In November 1986, the F-4Cs were replaced by later-model F-4Ds.

In December 1989 the 111th started receiving block 15 F-16C/D Fighting Falcon aircraft to replace their F-4Ds. The last F-16 arrived in April 1990.

==== Post Cold War era ====
In 1992, only a few years following the acceptance of their block 15s, they converted to the ADF variant of the block 15. On 15 March 15, 1992 the 111th was redesignated the 111th Fighter Squadron when its parent 147th Fighter Group converted to the USAF Objective Organization plan. Also in 1992 the 111th celebrated its 75th anniversary. To commemorate this F-16A ADF, serial 82-1001 was painted in special markings including a big Texas flag painted on the fuselage underside. During September 1995, the 111th FS ended its alert detachment in New Orleans with the F-101 Voodoo, also the 147th was upgraded to a Wing, with the 111th Fighter Squadron being assigned to the new 147th Operations Group.

In late 1996 the 111th started to retire their ADF F-16s to AMARC. To replace these aircraft the squadron received the block 25 F-16C/D Fighting Falcon. Transition started in September 1996 and was completed by February 1997. This brought a change in role which officially happened in October 1998. The role went from air-to-air to an air-to-ground mission. After returning from an Operation Southern Watch mission at Prince Sultan Air Base, Saudi Arabia in October 2000, the squadron added precision guided munitions to its arsenal.

==== Global war on terrorism ====
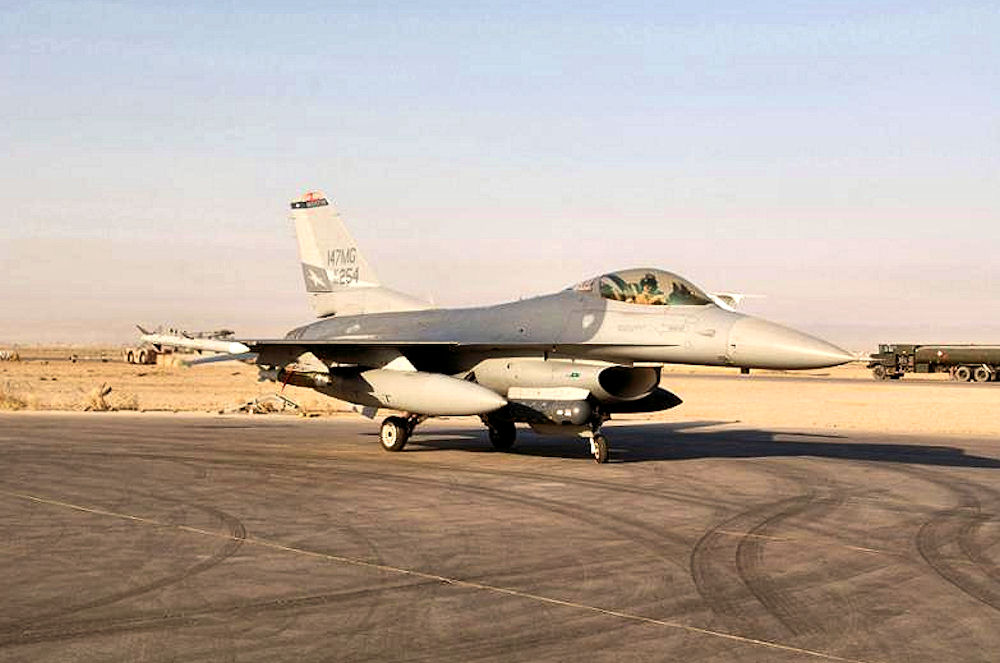
F-16C Block 25E Fighting Falcon 84-1309 at Balad AB, Iraq with the 111th EFS seen here taxiing following its mission on 4 September 2005 where it reached the 6,000 flying-hour mark

Following the 11 September 2001 terrorist attacks, four 111th Fighter Squadron aircraft were launched to escort President George W. Bush, onboard Air Force One from Florida to Louisiana, Nebraska and finally back to Washington DC that same day. December 2001 saw the 111th deploy to Atlantic City, New Jersey, to fly Air Defense Combat Air Patrol missions over New York, Philadelphia and Washington DC in support of Operation Noble Eagle.

In August 2005 components of the 111th Fighter Squadron and 147th Fighter Wing deployed to Balad Airbase, Iraq to conduct combat operations in support of Operation Iraqi Freedom and the Global War on Terrorism. The men and women of the 111th FS/147th FW once again distinguished themselves by flying 462 sorties and almost 1,900 hours in a two-month span; with a perfect record of 100% maintenance delivery (zero missed sorties), 100% mission effectiveness, and 100% weapons employment/hits under the most challenging combat conditions.

In April 2007, components of the 111th Fighter Squadron and 147th Fighter Wing again deployed to Balad Airbase, Iraq in support of Operation Iraqi Freedom and the Global War on Terrorism, where the men and women of the 111th continued their combat tradition. On this deployment the 111th Fighter Squadron flew 348 tasked sorties, plus six no-notice close air support alert scrambles and four short notice (less than 30-minute & not on the Air Tasking Order (Note: A method used to task and disseminate to components, subordinate units, and command and control agencies projected sorties/capabilities/ forces to targets and specific missions. Normally provides specific instructions to include call signs, targets, controlling agencies, etc., as well as general instructions.) pre-planned alert launches. With an average combat sortie lasting almost 4.42 hours, the unit accumulated a total of 1537.1 combat hours. Maintenance delivery effectiveness for this deployment was an astonishing 102% due to the inclusion of the unscheduled CAS scrambles. Mission effectiveness and weapons employment were both once again a perfect 100%.

==== 90th Anniversary ====
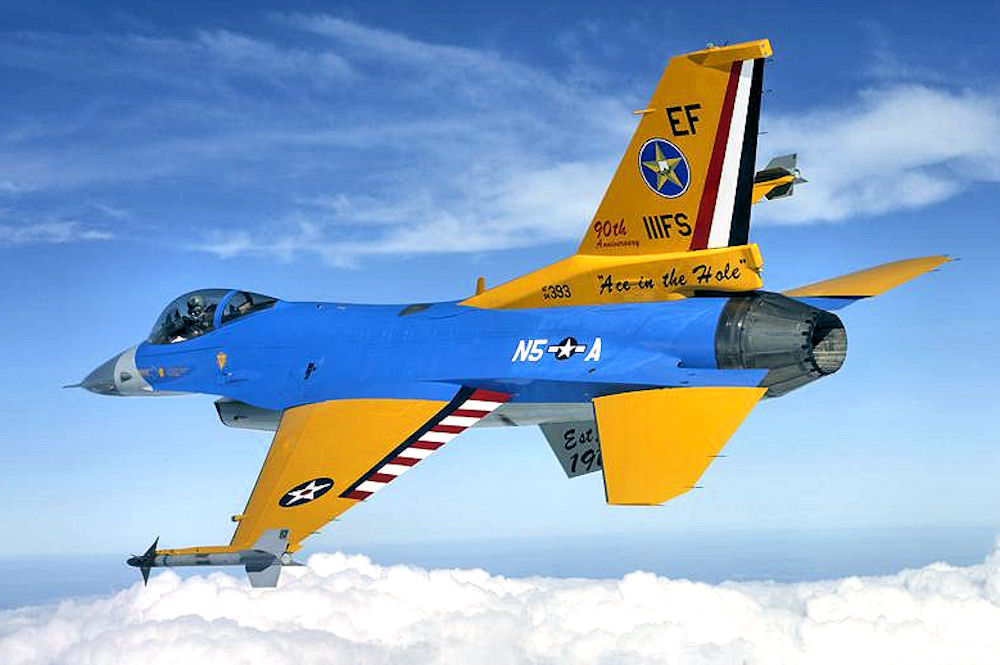
USAF F-16C block 25 #84-1393 from the 111th FS flies with a special paint job in honor of the squadron's 90th anniversary in 2007 (Note: All the colors and markings have specific meanings, reflecting the unit's nine-decade history. Aircraft was retired in September 2001 and placed on display at the Texas Military Forces Museum, Camp Mabry, Austin.)

In November 2007, an F-16C Fighting Falcon from the Texas Air National Guard's 111th Fighter Squadron received a special paint job in honor of the squadron's 90th anniversary.

All the colors and markings have specific meanings, reflecting the unit's nine-decade history. The rudder is painted like a JN-4 Jenny, which the squadron flew in the 1920s. The schemes for the wings and flaps recall the paint schemes of the pre-World War II era. The blue fuselage represents the Korean War, in which the squadron earned credit for two air victories. The gray underside represents the jet age. The "N5 A" was the insignia the squadron's P-51 Mustangs sported during World War II, in which the squadron claimed 44 air victories. Also representing World War II is the star on the fuselage, while the star on the wing represents the pre-World War II era. "Ace in the Hole" and the star on the tail replicate the markings of the squadron's F-84s during the Korean War. The ventral fin, partially obscured, reads "Est. 1917."

=== BRAC 2005 reorganization ===
During the 2005 Base Realignment and Closure Commission, it was recommended that the F-16 block 25s be retired. Texas Governor, Rick Perry, reacted quickly and made sure the unit could remain alive and did so by securing MQ-1 Predator operations. This is an unmanned aircraft and although not exactly what the 111th FS had hoped for, it would keep the unit going well into the future.

As was earlier planned in 2005, the 111th FS gave up its last two F-16s on 7 June 2008 and F-16 operations drew to a close. The MQ-1 replaced the F-16 and the parent wing was renamed the 147th Reconnaissance Wing that same month.

== Lineage ==
633d Aero Squadron

- Organized as the 111th Aero Squadron on 14 August 1917 (Note: This squadron is not related to the 111th Aero Squadron that was organized in Rich Field, Texas in March 1918, moved to Dorr Field. Florida then to Carlstrom Field, Florida in May, was designated Squadron C, Carlstrom Field in July and demovilized in November 1918.)

Redesignated as 111th Aero Squadron (Supply) on 1 September 1917
Redesignated 632d Aero Squadron (Supply) on 1 February 1918
Demobilized on 19 August 1919
Reconstituted and consolidated with the 111th Observation Squadron on 20 October 1936

111th Attack Squadron

- Authorized as the 111th Observation Squadron and allotted to the Texas National Guard

Activated on 29 June 1923
Consolidated with the 632d Aero Squadron on 20 October 1936
Ordered to active service on 25 November 1940
Redesignated 111th Observation Squadron (Medium) on 13 January 1942
Redesignated 111th Observation Squadron on 4 July 1942
Redesignated 111th Reconnaissance Squadron (Fighter) on 31 May 1943
Redesignated 111th Tactical Reconnaissance Squadron on 13 November 1943
Inactivated on 15 December 1945
Redesignated 111th Fighter Squadron, Single Engine and allotted to the National Guard on 24 May 1946.
Extended federal recognition on 27 January 1947
Federalized and ordered to active service on 10 October 1950
Redesignated 111th Fighter-Bomber Squadron on 26 October 1950
Inactivated, released from active duty and returned to Texas state control on 10 July 1952
Redesignated 111th Fighter Interceptor Squadron on 10 July 1952
Redesignated 111th Fighter-Bomber Squadron on 1 January 1953
Redesignated 111th Fighter Interceptor Squadron on 1 July 1955
Redesignated 111th Fighter-Interceptor Squadron, Training on 1 January 1970
Redesignated 111th Fighter Interceptor Squadron, 1 October 1982
Redesignated 111th Fighter Squadron on 10 March 1992
Redesignated 111th Reconnaissance Squadron on 1 July 2008
Redesignated 111th Attack Squadron in 2017

=== Assignments ===
- Post Headquarters, Kelly Field, 14 August 1917 – 19 August 1919
- Texas National Guard (divisional aviation, 36th Division), 29 June 1923
- Eighth Corps Area, 25 November 1940
- Third Army, c. Dec 1940
- VIII Army Corps, c. Mar 1941
- Third Army, c. Jun 1941
- III Air Support Command, 1 September 1941 (attached to 68th Observation Group from Feb 1942)
- Eighth Air Force, 16 March 1942
- 68th Observation Group (later 68th Reconnaissance Group, 68th Tactical Reconnaissance Group), 29 March 1942

Attached to XII Air Support Command (later XII Tactical Air Command), 12–31 March 1943, 20 June 1943 – 26 May 1944
Attached to: 3rd Air Defense Wing (later 64th Fighter Wing) for operations, June–September 1943

- XII Tactical Air Command, 26 May 1944

Attached to Provisional Reconnaissance Group, 16 October 1944

- 69th Tactical Reconnaissance Group (later 69th Reconnaissance Group), 20 April 1945
- 10th Reconnaissance Group, 2 July – 15 December 1945.
- 136th Fighter Group (later 136th Fighter-Bomber Group), 27 January 1947 – 10 July 1952
- 136th Fighter-Interceptor Group (later 136th Fighter-Bomber Group, 136th Fighter-Interceptor Group, 136th Fighter Group), 10 July 1952
- 136th Fighter-Bomber Group (late, 1 January 1953
- 147th Fighter Group (later 147th Fighter-Interceptor Group, 147th Fighter Group), 1 July 1957
- 147th Operations Group, 1 October 1995 – present

=== Stations ===
- Kelly Field, Texas, 14 August 1917 – 19 August 1919
- Ellington Field, Texas, 29 June 1923
- Houston Municipal Airport, Texas, 1927
- Brownwood Army Air Field, Texas, 12 January 1941
- Camp Clark, Texas, December 1941
- Daniel Field, Georgia, 19 February 1942
- Morris Field, North Carolina, 9 July – 22 September 1942
- RAF Wattisham (AAF-377), England, 3–21 Oct 1942
- Saint-Leu Airfield, Algeria, 10 November 1942
- Oran Tafaraoui Airport, Algeria 16 November 1942
- Oujda Airfield, French Morocco, 19 December 1942

Detachment operated from Oran Es Sénia Airport, Algeria 11–27 Feb 1943

- Guercif Airfield, French Morocco, 4 April 1943
- Nouvion Airfield, Algeria, 27 May 1943

Air echelon at Bou Ficha Airfield, Tunisia, c. 20 Jun – 2 July 1943

- Tunis Airfield, Tunisia, 3 July 1943

Air echelon at Korba Airfield, Tunisia, 2–14 Jul 1943
Air echelon at Ponte Olivo, Sicily, 14–16 Jul 1943

- Ponte Olivo Airfield, Sicily, 16 July 1943
- Gela Airfield, Sicily, 19 July 1943
- Termini Airfield, Sicily, 11 August 1943

Detachment operated from Gela Airfield, Sicily, to 2 September 1943

- San Antonio Airfield, Sicily, 1 September 1943
- Sele Airfield, Italy, 16 September 1943

Detachment operated from: San Antonio Airfield, Sicily, to 30 September 1943
Detachment operated from: Capodichino Airport, Naples, Italy, 30 September – 14 October 1943

- Pomigliano Airfield, Italy, 5 October 1943

Detachment operated from: Santa Maria Airfield, Italy, 18 April – 6 June 1944

- Santa Maria Airfield, Italy, 9 May 1944
- Nettuno Airfield, Italy, 6 June 1944
- Galera Airfield, Italy, 11 June 1944
- Voltone Airfield, Italy, 18 June 1944
- Follonica Airfield, Italy, 2 July 1944
- Borgo Airfield, Corsica, 21 Ju1 1944

Detachment operated from Santa Maria Airfield, Italy, 21 Jul – 9 August 1944
Detachment operated from St Maxime and Grimaud, France, 15–21 Aug 1944
Detachment operated from St. Raphael/Frejus Airfield (Y-12), France, after 21 August 1944

- St. Raphael/Frejus Airfield (Y-12), France, 27 August 1944
- Valance Airfield (Y-23), France, 5 September 1944
- Satolas-et-Bonce Airfield, France, 9 September 1944
- Dijon Airfield (Y-9), France, 23 September 1944
- Nancy-Azelot Airfield (Y-80), France, 30 October 1944
- Haguenau Airfield (Y-39), France, 2 April 1945
- AAF Station Fürth, Germany, 1 July 1945
- Creil, France, 15 Oct-15 Dec 1945
- Houston Municipal Airport, Texas, 27 January 1947
- Langley Air Force Base, Virginia, 24 October 1950 – 13 May 1951
- Itazuke Air Base, Japan, 15 May 1951
- Taegu Air Base (K-2), South Korea, 16 November 1951 – 10 July 1952
- Houston Municipal Airport, Texas, 10 July 1952
- Ellington Air Force Base (later Ellington Air National Guard Base, Ellington Field Joint Reserve Base), Texas, 1956 – present

==== Known deployments ====
- Korean War Federalization
- Operation Southern Watch (AEF)

Operated from: Ahmad al-Jaber Air Base, Kuwait 1997 (6 F-16s)

- Operation Southern Watch (AEF)

Operated from: Prince Sultan Air Base, Saudi Arabia, October-15 November 2000

- Operation Iraqi Freedom (AEF)

Operated from: Balad Air Base, Iraq, August–October 2005
Operated from: Balad Air Base, Iraq, April–June 2007

=== Aircraft ===
- Included JN-4, TW-3, PT-1, PT-3, BT-1, 0-2, and 0-17 during period 1923–1931
- Douglas O-38, 1931–1935
- Douglas O-43, 1935–1942
- North American O-47, C. 1939–1942
- O-49 Vigilant, 1941–1942
- Douglas O-9, 1941–1942
- O-59 Grasshopper, 1941–1942
- F-3A Havoc, 1942–1943
- P-39F-2 Airacobra, 1943
- Spitfire PR XI, 1943
- F-4 Lightning, 1943
- F-6 Mustang, 1943–1945
- A-36 Apache, 1943–1944
- UC-64A Norseman, 1945
- L-5 Sentinel, 1945
- F-51D Mustang, 1947–1951
- F-84E Thunderjet, 1951–1952
- F-84G Thunderjet, 1952
- F-51H Mustang, 1952–1955
- F-80 Shooting Star, 1955–1957
- F-86D Sabre, 1957–1959
- F-86L Sabre, 1959–1960
- TF/F-102A Delta Dagger, 1960–1975
- F-101B/F Voodoo, 1971–1982
- RF-4C Phantom II, 1974
- F-4C Phantom II, 1982–1987
- F-4D Phantom II, 1987–1989
- Block 15 F-16A/B Fighting Falcon, 1989–1996
- Block 25 F-16C/D Fighting Falcon, 1996–2008
- MQ-1B Predator, 2008–2017
- MQ-9 Reaper, 2017-Present

==== Support Aircraft ====
- C-26B Metroliner (1991–2007)
- C-26A Metroliner (1989–1995)
- C-131B Samaritan (1978–1989) (Miss Piggy)
- VT-29D Samaritan (1974–1978)
- Cessna U-3A (1970–1974)
- C-54 Skymaster (1967–1974)
- T-33A Shooting Star (1951–1987), (1957–1962) (18 aircraft for the Jet Instruction School)
- C-47 Skytrain (1947–1967)
- B-26 Invader (1947–1950) (Target tug)
- L-5 Sentinel (1947–1951)
- Republic P-43 Lancer (1942) (State-side training)
- P-40 Warhawk (1942) (State-side training)
- BC-1A Texan (1940–1941)
- O-17 Courier (1928–1933) – supplemented O-2Hs, later modified-the PT-3 standard and kept as trainers
- PT-1 Trusty (1927)
- Huff-Daland TW-5 (1924–1926)
- PT-1 Trusty (1924–1926)
- Vought VE-7 Bluebird (1924–1926)
- Airco DH-4B (1924–1926) – single aircraft assigned-the Unit Instructor

== See also ==
- List of American aero squadrons
- List of observation squadrons of the United States Army National Guard
