= TXARNG =

TXARNG may refer to:

- Texas Army National Guard
- Texas Air National Guard
