= 182d Fighter Squadron =

182d Fighter Squadron

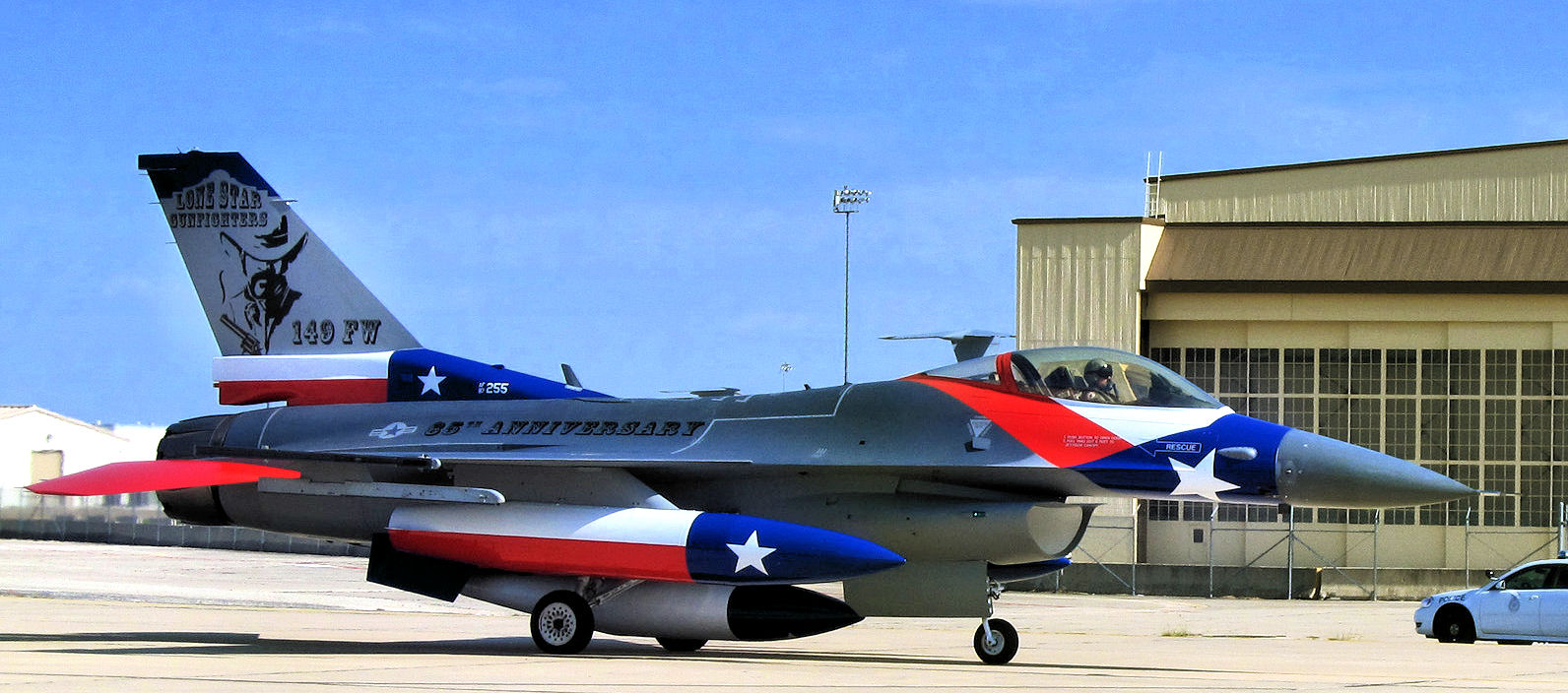
- Squadron F-16 Fighting Falcon returning to Lackland Air Force Base after being painted to honor the 65th anniversary of squadron affiliation with the Texas ANG (Note: Aircraft is General Dynamics F-16C Block 30F Fighting Falcon, serial 87-0255.)
- Active: 1943–1946; 1947–1952; 1952–1969; 1969–present
- Country: United States
- Allegiance: Texas
- Branch: Air National Guard
- Type: Squadron
- Role: Fighter & Combat Training
- Part of: Texas Air National Guard
- Garrison/HQ: Kelly Field Annex, Joint Base San Antonio, Texas
- Nicknames: Thunder Bums (World War II); Lone Star Gunfighters
- Engagements: European Theater of Operations; Korean War; Operation Noble Eagle
- Decorations: Distinguished Unit Citation; Belgian Fourragère

Insignia
- 182d Fighter Squadron emblem

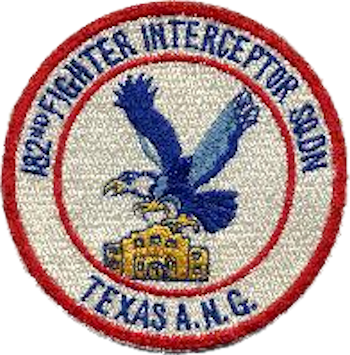
- Patch with 182d Fighter-Interceptor Squadron emblem
- Tail code: SA
- World War II fuselage code: C2

The 182d Fighter Squadron is a unit of the Texas Air National Guard 149th Fighter Wing located at Kelly Field Annex, Joint Base San Antonio, Texas. The 149th is equipped with the F-16C/D Fighting Falcon.

It was first activated in June 1943 as The 396th Fighter Squadron, assigned to the 368th Fighter Group. After training in the United States, it moved to the European Theater of Operations, where it served in combat until the spring of 1945 with Ninth Air Force, earning a Distinguished Unit Citation and a Belgian Fourragère for its actions. Following V-E Day, the squadron served in the army of occupation at AAF Station Straubing, Germany until was inactivated on 20 August 1946 and transferred its personnel and equipment to another unit, which was activated in its place.

== History ==
=== World War II ===
==== Organization and training ====
The squadron was first organized at Westover Field, Massachusetts in June 1943 as the 396th Fighter Squadron, one of the original squadrons of the 368th Fighter Group. The squadron drew its initial cadre from the 326th Fighter Group, an Operational Training Unit at Westover. In June 1943, the cadre of the squadron travelled to Orlando Army Air Base for training at the Army Air Forces School of Applied Tactics.

The 396th trained with Republic P-47 Thunderbolts, moving to Farmingdale Army Air Field, New York to complete its training. The squadron and group left Farmingdale for the Port of Embarkation, Camp Myles Standish on 20 December 1943 and boarded the SS Argentina to sail for Great Britain on 29 December, arriving at the Firth of Clyde on 7 January 1944.

==== Combat in Europe ====
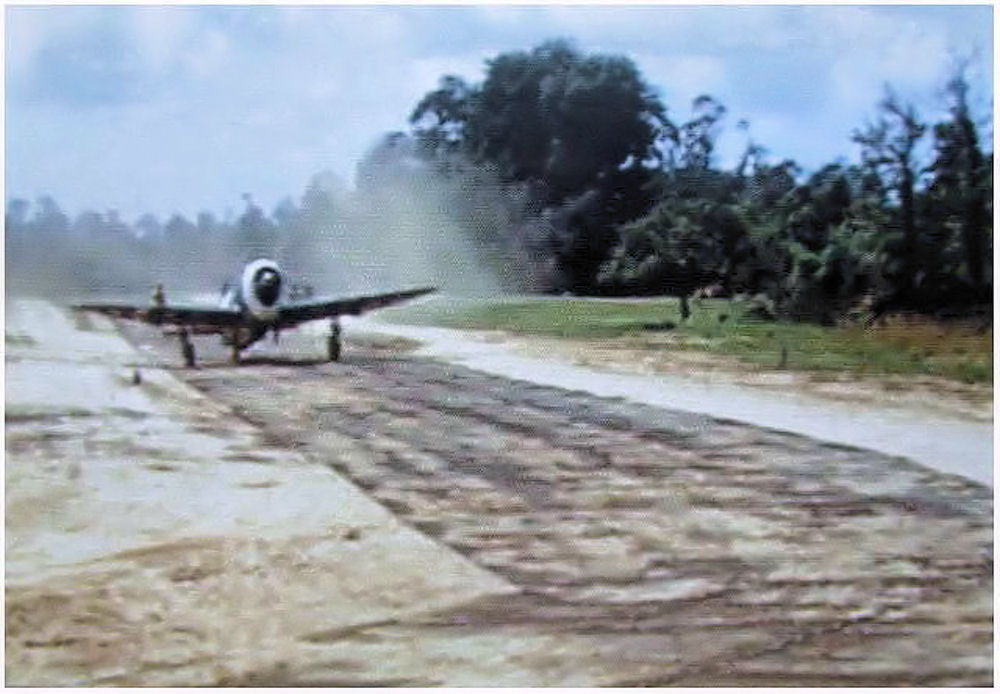
P-47 Taxiing at Cardonville Airfield

The squadron arrived at RAF Greenham Common on 13 January 1944. It began operations on 14 March, when it flew a fighter sweep over the coast of France. That was to be the unit's only mission from Greenham Common, for it moved the next day to RAF Chilbolton, as the 438th Troop Carrier Group moved into Greenham Common. It made strafing and bombing attacks on transportation targets and flak batteries in preparation for Operation Overlord, the invasion of France. The squadron also participated in Operation Crossbow, attacking launch sites for V-1 flying bombs and V-2 rockets. On D-Day, the group supported the landing forces in Normandy.

Two weeks after the landings, it moved to Cardonville Airfield, an advanced landing ground in northern France and began operations from the Continent as an element of IX Tactical Air Command. The squadron provided close air support for forces in the Battle of Cherbourg, which secured a vital port for further operations in France. It participated in the air operations that prepared the way for Operation Cobra, the Allied breakthrough at St Lo on 25 July, and supported ground forces during their drive across France. In early August, the squadron became part of XIX Tactical Air Command, which would concentrate on air support for General George S. Patton's Third United States Army.

By early September, fuel shortages were impacting both Third Army and XIX Tactical Air Command, slowing the Allied advance, and sometimes forcing fighter-bombers to land at forward bases to refuel. On 3 September 1944, operating from Chartres Airfield, and in the face of "withering anti-aircraft and small arms fire," the squadron destroyed numerous motor transport vehicles, horse-drawn vehicles, and uncounted troops in the vicinity of Mons (Bergen), Belgium, also attacking as targets of opportunity enemy positions that obstructed the progress of Allied ground forces. For this action, the squadron was awarded the Distinguished Unit Citation. The squadron then moved closer to the front, arriving at Laon/Athies Airfield on 11 September. It was cited in the order of the day for the first time by the Belgian Army for the period from D-Day through the end of September.

The squadron continued its support of allied ground forces, participated in the assault against the Siegfried Line, and took part in the Battle of the Bulge from December 1944 through January 1945 by attacking rail lines and trains, marshalling yards, roads and vehicles, armored columns, and gun positions. It was cited in the order of the day for a second time by the Belgian Army for this support and awarded the Belgian Fourragère. The squadron continued operations with the Allied forces that pushed across the Rhine and into Germany until the end of the war. The last combat mission flown by the 368th Group was a fighter sweep near Prague on 5 May 1945. The squadron ended the war credited with the destruction of 40 enemy aircraft.

==== Army of occupation ====
After V-E Day, the unit served with the army of occupation, at AAF Station Straubing. On 20 August 1946, the 368th Group and its elements were inactivated and replaced at Straubing by the 78th Fighter Group. The squadron transferred it personnel and equipment to the 83d Fighter Squadron, which was simultaneously activated.

=== Texas Air National Guard ===
The next day the squadron was redesignated as the 182d Fighter Squadron, and was allotted to the National Guard. It was organized at Brooks Field and was extended federal recognition on 27 January 1947 by the National Guard Bureau. The squadron was assigned to the Texas Air National Guard 136th Fighter Group and was equipped with F-51D Mustangs.

The mission of the squadron was the air defense of Texas. During the postwar years, the 182d primarily trained the Hill Country and west Texas; the 181st Fighter Squadron, based at Love Field, Dallas, covered north Texas, and the 111th Fighter Squadron, based at Houston Municipal Airport, covered east and southeast Texas to the Mexican Border.

==== Korean War Activation ====
As a result of the Korean War, the Texas Air National Guard was federalized and placed on active-duty status on 10 October 1950, being assigned to Ninth Air Force, Tactical Air Command (TAC). TAC ordered the 136th Fighter Group to Langley Air Force Base, Virginia, where the unit was redesignated to a fighter-bomber unit, and it was assigned to the new 136th Fighter-Bomber Wing. At Langley, the 136th Fighter-Bomber Group consisted of the 111th, 182d, and 154th Fighter-Bomber Squadrons (Arkansas ANG).

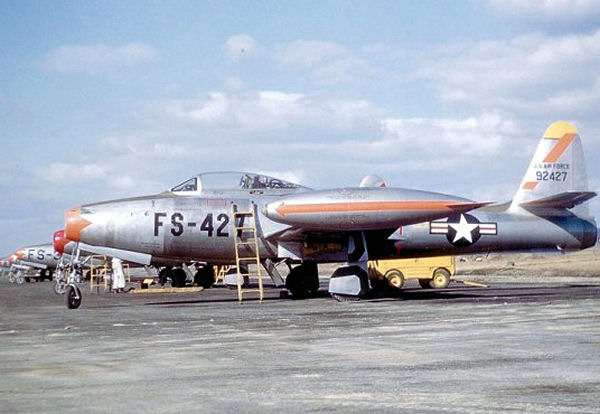
136th FBW F-84E Thunderjet at Taegu Air Force Base (K-2), South Korea

At Langley, the 136th trained with their F-51D Mustangs, uUnfortunately losing two 111th Squadron pilots in a training accident on 15 December. A third pilot was killed on 27 January 1951 in another accident. In February 1951, the aged F-51Ds that the unit had been flying since its activation in 1947 were replaced by F-84E Thunderjets, and the squadron began transition training on the jet fighter-bomber. Most of the training took place at Langley, although some pilots were sent to Shaw Air Force Base, South Carolina. Maintenance crews, all new to jet aircraft, were trained at Langley and engine specialists were sent to the Allison plant in Indianapolis. Assigned to the Arkansas ANG 154th FBS at the time was a Navy exchange pilot, future NASA astronaut Lieutenant Walter Schirra (who happened to be the only pilot assigned to the 136th at the time who was a qualified jet pilot).

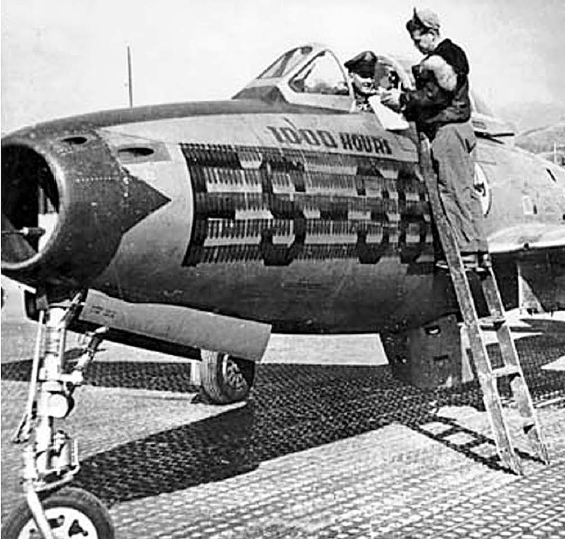
Members of the 182nd Fighter-Bomber Squadron close out flight records at Taegu Air Base, following their F-84E became the first such aircraft to complete 1,000 flying hours (Note: The squadron members are Captain John McMahn and Sergeant White. The aircraft is Republic F-84E-15-RE Thunderjet, serial 49-2360, Miss Jacque II. Note the mission markers.)

In May 1951, less than seven months later, the wing was deployed to Japan, being attached to Far East Air Forces and stationed at Itazuke Air Force Base, the first echelon of the 136th arriving on 18 May. The 136th replaced the Strategic Air Command (SAC) 27th Fighter-Escort Wing, which had deployed to Far East Air Force in the early days of the Korean War. At Itazuke, the squadrons took over the F-84Es of the 27th, which remained in place, its aircraft being reassigned from SAC to Far East Air Forces. On 2 June, the final elements of the 136th arrived in Japan, the national guardsmen officially relieved the 27th Fighter Bomber Wing and the SAC airmen departed for the United States. The 136th was the first Air National Guard wing in history to enter combat.

From Japan the wing engaged in combat operations over South Korea, however flying in the North Pacific area was a challenge to the wing, losing seven F-84Es in non-combat operations and three in combat. On 26 June, in one of the largest air-to-air battles in Korea, two 182d, Captain Harry Underwood and 1st Lt Arthur Olighter shot down an enemy MiG-15 that broke through an F-86 Sabre escort of four B-29s. Two 111th Squadron pilots, 1sts Lt John Morse and John Marlins scored probables in the same encounter. These were the first combat victories by Air National Guard pilots. On 3 July the 136th sent their aircraft to North Korea, attacking FLAK batteries in downtown Pyongyang while other aircraft attacked North Korean airfields.

However, the short-legged F-84 had limited combat time over Korea, therefore on 16 November 1951 the wing moved to Taegu Air Force Base (K-2) in South Korea for its combat operations. In 1952, the 136th was re-equipped with the F-84G Thunderjet, designed for tactical close air support of ground forces.

During its time in combat, the 136th Wing flew 15,515 combat sorties; was credited with 4 enemy aircraft destroyed; 7 probables and 72 others damaged. It was the first ANG unit to down a MiG-15; it dropped 23,749 (7,120 tons) of bombs and expended over 3 million rounds of .50 caliber ammunition; being awarded Five Korean Campaign Ribbons. The 136th Fighter-Bomber Wing was released from active duty and returned to the United States on 10 July 1952

==== Air Defense Command ====
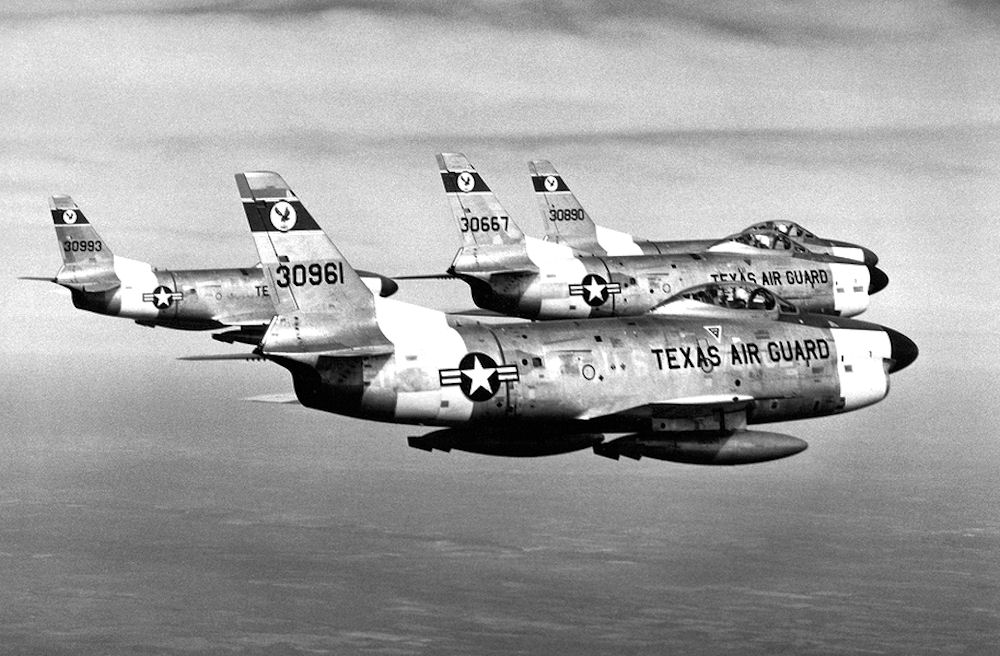
182d F-86L Sabre Interceptors, 1959

With the 182d's return from the Korean War, the squadron was re-equipped with the very long range F-51H Mustang, which had been developed to escort B-29 Superfortress bombers in the Pacific Theater from the Mariana Islands to the Japanese Home Islands. The F-51H would allow the squadron to intercept any unidentified aircraft over any part of Texas. The squadron became part of Air Defense Command (ADC) and resumed its postwar mission of Texas air defense. On 16 January 1955, four P-51s assigned to the 182d were sold to Costa Rica and sent immediately out of country to boost that small country's air arm in fighting a five-day-old rebellion. The fighters were dispatched from Kelly Air Force Base in a fully armed state. Fernando Fournier, the undersecretary of foreign affairs for Costa Rica, said it was his understanding that the Mustangs were sold for a dollar apiece.

It was not until August 1956 that the 182d received first-generation F-80C Shooting Star jets, replacing some of the last F-51H Mustangs in the USAF inventory. In 1957, the squadron was selected by the Air Defense Command to man a runway alert program on full 24-hour basis – with armed jet fighters ready to "scramble" at a moment's notice. This event brought the wing into the daily combat operational program of the USAF, placing them on "the end of the runway" alongside regular USAF-Air Defense Fighter Squadrons. The obsolescent F-80 day fighters were upgraded to the all-weather/day/night F-86D Sabre Interceptor by the end of the year. In June 1959 the squadron traded their F-86Ds for the upgraded F-86L Sabre Interceptor with uprated afterburning engines and new electronics.

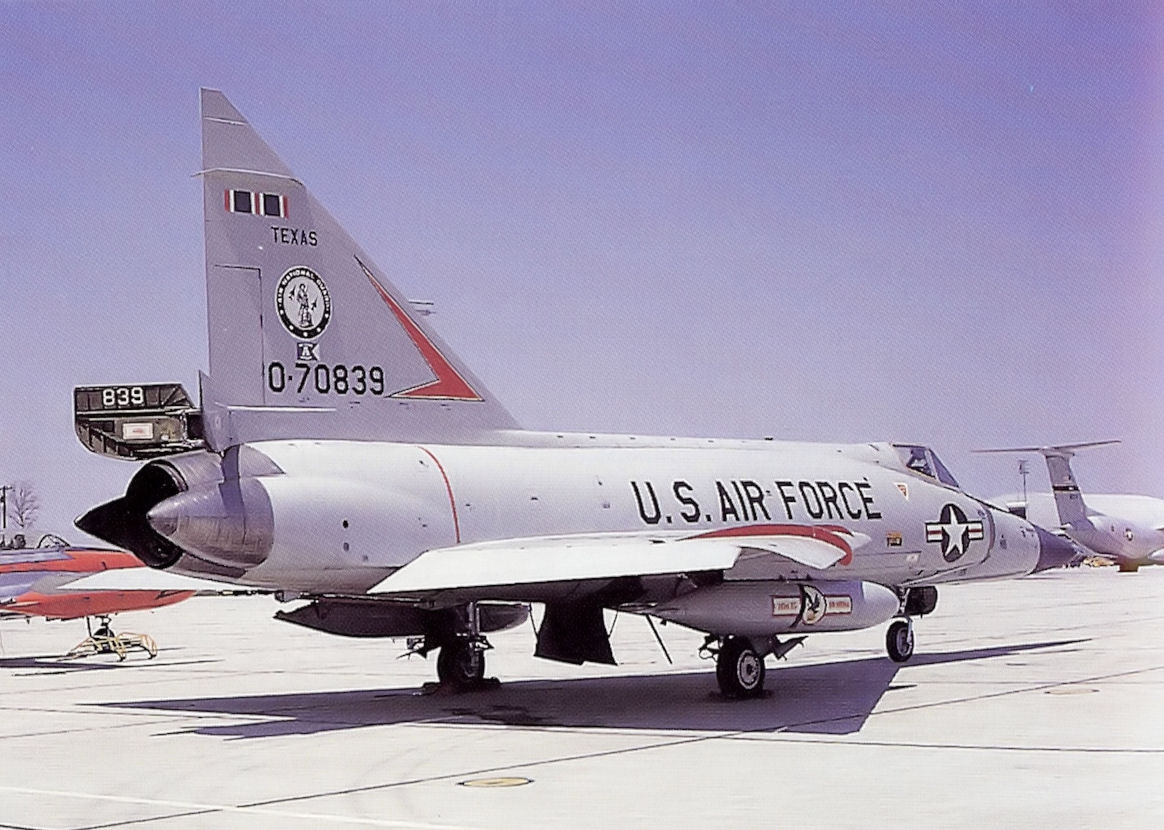
182d Fighter Interceptor Squadron – Convair F-102A 57-839

In July 1960 the unit became one of the first to transition to the F-102A Delta Dagger Mach 1.2 all-weather interceptor and began a 24-hour alert to guard the Texas Gulf coast. The 182d enjoyed the distinction of being the first F-102 "Deuce" squadron in the Air National Guard.

When flight operations ended at Brooks Air Force Base in October 1960, the squadron was moved to nearby Kelly Air Force Base, beginning operations on 1 November 1960. In August 1961, as part of an Air Defense Command reorganization, the 182d Fighter Interceptor Squadron's assignment to 136th Air Defense Wing was terminated with 136th's mobilization gaining command being transferred to Tactical Air Command (TAC). As a result, the 182d was authorized to expand to a group level, and the 149th Fighter Group was established. The 182d Fighter-Interceptor Squadron became the group's flying squadron. Other elements assigned into the group were the 149th headquarters, 149th Material Squadron (maintenance and supply), 149th Air Base Squadron, and the 149th USAF Dispensary. The 149th was directly assigned to the Texas Air National Guard, being operationally gained by the Air Defense Command 33d Air Division.

As with many other ANG squadrons, the 182d temporally operated two TF-102 twin-seat trainers for ANG F-102 pilots while remaining on runway alert status. Also, the squadron operated T-33A Shooting Star jet trainers and a Convair VT-29 transport for courier duties.

==== Tactical Air Support ====
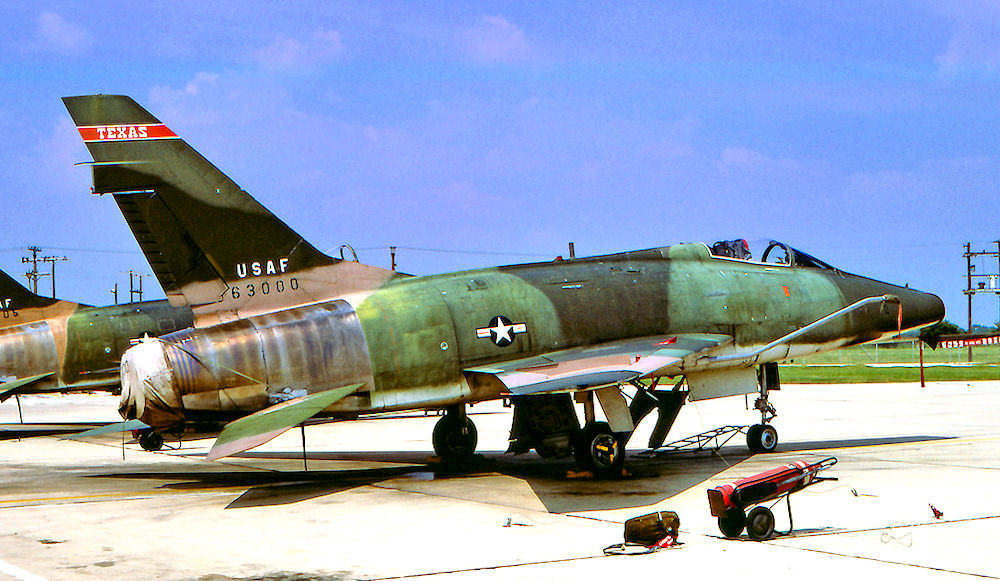
The famous "triple null" F-100D 56-3000, while assigned to the 182d TFS in the early 1970s.

In 1968, the Air National Guard began to retire its F-102s and the 182d was ordered to send their aircraft to Davis-Monthan AFB for storage at AMARC. In July, as part of the drawdown of continental fighter air defense, the 149th Group was transferred from ADC to TAC, with the Group and 182d being redesignated as a tactical fighter group and squadron.

As an interim measure, the 182d Tactical Fighter Squadron was equipped with obsolescent F-84F Thunderjets. The squadron was the second-to-last ANG squadron to fly the F-84F. During the summer of 1971 the 182d began to receive F-100D/F Super Sabre tactical fighter bombers. The 182d was one of the first ANG squadrons to receive the Super Sabre, as most were being operated in South Vietnam at the time. The F-100s received by the squadron were aircraft being withdrawn from the 20th Tactical Fighter Wing at RAF Wethersfield and the 48th Tactical Fighter Wing at RAF Lakenheath, England.

RAF Wethersfield was being closed for flight operations and the 20th was being re-equipped with the new General Dynamics F-111 Aardvark at their new base, RAF Upper Heyford.

The Super Sabre was used as a dedicated fighter-bomber later in its career, once the air-superiority role had been taken over by more modern aircraft, and the squadron trained in using the fighter for ground support. Beginning in 1975, the 182d began a NATO commitment, with squadron aircraft and personnel deploying to the United States Air Forces in Europe (USAFE) for Autumn Forge/Cold Fire/Reforger exercises.

By 1979, the Super Sabres were being retired, and were replaced by McDonnell F-4C Phantom IIs, largely Vietnam War veteran aircraft, that were made available to the Air National Guard. With the Phantom, the 182d continued their tactical fighter mission with the more capable aircraft. The squadron also continued its NATO deployments, exercising at USAFE bases in West Germany, England, the Netherlands and Denmark.

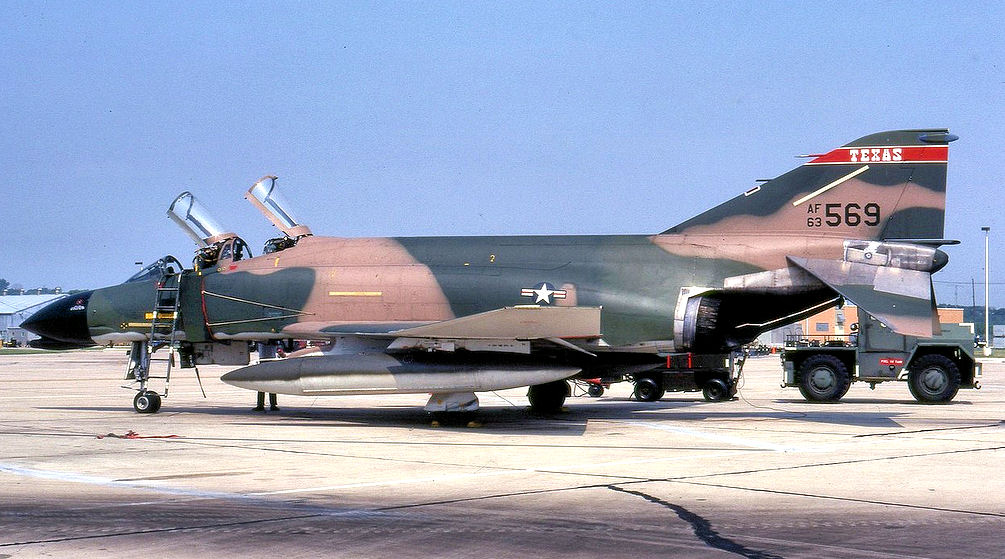
182d Tactical Fighter Squadron F-4C Phantom II (Note: Aircraft is a McDonnell F-4C-19-MC Phantom II, serial 63-7569.)

In 1986, the Phantoms were reaching the end of the operational service, and they were replaced by the F-16A Fighting Falcon. The F-16s were transferred from the 347th Tactical Fighter Wing, Moody Air Force Base, Georgia. Initially the squadron began to receive Block 15 single-seat F-16As, and a few twin-seat F-16Bs. The Block 15 was the major production model of the F-16A.

Higher-performance Block 25 F-16C/D aircraft replaced the standard fighter-bomber Block 15 A/B model aircraft in 1996. Although similar in appearance to the earlier models, the Block 25 aircraft were a considerable advancement with the Westinghouse AN/APG-68(V) multi-mode radar with better range, sharper resolution, and expanded operating modes. The planar array in the nose provides numerous air-to-air modes, including range-while-search, uplook and velocity search, single target track, raid cluster resolution, and track-while-scan for up to 10 targets. The radar was capable of handling the guidance of the AGM-65 Maverick air-to-surface missile. Upgraded engines made the aircraft capable of Mach 2 performance.

In 1997, the squadron deployed aircraft and personnel to Ahmad al-Jaber Air Base, Kuwait, in support of Operation Southern Watch.

However, the Block 25 aircraft were all powered by the Pratt & Whitney F100-PW-200 turbofan, which were prone to engine stalls. In 1998, the squadron received Block 30 aircraft, with wider intakes and the General Electric F-110 engine. However, by the mid-1990s and with the end of the Cold War, there appeared to be no longer any threat to America's homeland from bombers or cruise missiles.

=== Training operations ===
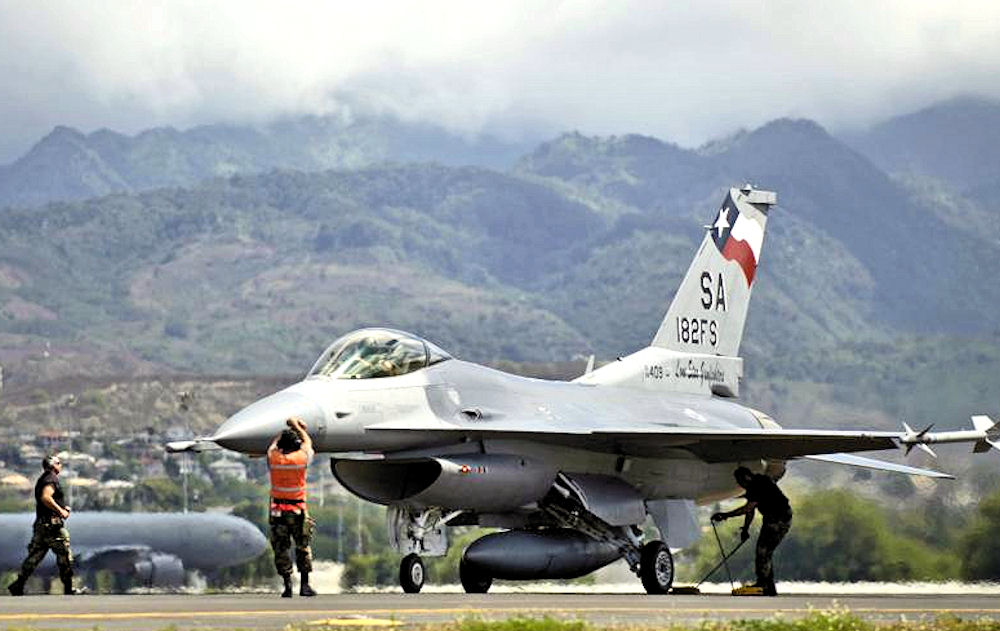
Crew chiefs recover their F-16 after it returned to Hickam AFB, Hawaii from an air-to-air mission on 8 September 2006, during Exercise Sentry Aloha.

In 1999, the mission of the squadron was changed from air combat operations to becoming a Formal Training Unit (FTU) for Air National Guard F-16 pilots under Air Education and Training Command. The 182d provides combat training for active duty, Air National Guard, and Reserve F-16 pilots, including recent graduates from USAF Undergraduate Pilot Training making them combat ready upon graduation of a 9-month course. Almost all instructor pilots within the unit are former active duty F-16 pilots.

Although the squadron is not officially a combat unit, after the 9/11 attacks in 2001 and 2002, the squadron flew Operation Noble Eagle air defense missions in the United States in support of USNORTHCOM and the U.S. Department of Homeland Security. It also deploys to other bases, flying Dissimilar air combat training missions against active-duty, reserve and ANG units.

In its 2005 BRAC Recommendations, DoD recommended to realign the 178th Fighter Wing, Ohio Air National Guard to an MQ-1 Predator ISR mission and transfer six additional Block 30 F-16 aircraft to the 182d Fighter Squadron. DoD claimed that its recommendation was made because Lackland (Kelly Annex) (47) had higher military value than Springfield-Beckley AGB (128). This recommendation also would optimize the squadron size of the 182d, the only ANG F-16 Flying Training Unit. The squadron's Block 30 aircraft, manufactured between 1987 and 1989 are currently reaching the end of their service life. They have been certified by Boeing though at least 2015, however it is unclear what aircraft or what the mission of the unit will transition to in the future.

== Lineage ==
182nd Fighter-Inerceptor Squadron

- Constituted as the 396th Fighter Squadron on 24 May 1943.

Activated on 1 June 1943
Inactivated on 20 August 1946

- Redesignated 182nd Fighter Squadron and allotted to the National Guard on 21 August 1946

Organized and extended federal recognition on 27 January 1947
Federalized and ordered to active service on: 10 October 1950
Redesignated 182nd Fighter-Bomber Squadron on 26 October 1950
Inactivated and returned to Texas state control on 10 July 1952
Redesignated 182nd Fighter-Interceptor Squadron and activated on 10 July 1952
Redesignated 182nd Fighter-Bomber Squadron on 1 January 1953
Redesignated 182nd Fighter-Interceptor Squadron on 1 July 1955
Inactivated on 13 September 1969
Consolidated with the 182nd Tactical Fighter Squadron on 17 August 1989

182nd Fighter Squadron

- Constituted as the 182nd Tactical Fighter Squadron on 1 May 1969

Activated on 14 September 1969
Consolidated with the 182nd Fighter-Interceptor Squadron on 17 August 1989
Redesignated 182nd Fighter Squadron on 16 March 1992

=== Assignments ===
- 368th Fighter Group, 1 June 1943 – 20 August 1946
- 136th Fighter Group (later 136th Fighter-Bomber Group), 27 January 1947 – 20 July 1952
- 136th Fighter-Interceptor Group (later 136th Fighter-Bomber Group, 136th Fighter-Interceptor Group), 20 July 1952 –
- 149th Fighter Group (Air Defense), 1 July 1960 – 13 September 1969
- 149th Tactical Fighter Group (later 149th Fighter Group), 14 September 1969
- 149th Operations Group, 1 October 1995 – present

=== Stations ===
- Westover Field, Massachusetts, 1 June 1943
- Farmingdale Army Air Field, New York, 24 August – 20 December 1943
- RAF Greenham Common (AAF-486), England, 13 January 1944
- RAF Chilbolton (AAF-404), England, 15 March 1944
- Cardonville Airfield (A-3), France, 20 June 1944
- Chartres Airfield (A-40), France, 27 August 1944
- Laon/Athies Airfield (A-69), France, 11 September 1944
- Chièvres Airfield (A-84), Belgium, 2 October 1944
- Juvincourt Airfield (A-68), France, 27 December 1944
- Metz Airfield (Y-34), France, 5 January 1945
- Frankfurt/Rhein-Main Airfield (Y-73), Germany, 15 April 1945
- AAF Station Buchschwabach (R-42), Germany, 13 May 1945
- AAF Station Straubing (R-68), Germany, 13 August 1945 – 20 August 1946
- Brooks Air Force Base, Texas, 27 January 1947
- Langley Air Force Base, Virginia, 24 October 1950
- Itazuke Air Base, Japan, 13 May 1950
- Taegu Air Base, Korea, May 1951 – 20 July 1952
- Brooks Air Force Base, Texas, 20 July 1952
- San Antonio Airport, August 1956
- Kelly Air Force Base (later Kelly Annex), Texas, April 1976

Operated from Ahmad al-Jaber Air Base, Kuwait, 1997

=== Aircraft ===
- P-47D Thunderbolt, 1943–1946
- F-51D Mustang, 1947–1951
- F-84E Thunderjet, 1951–1952
- F-84G Thunderjet, 1952
- F-51H Mustang, 1952–1955
- F-80C Shooting Star, 1955–1957
- F-86D Sabre, 1957–1959
- F-86L Sabre, 1959–1960
- F-102A Delta Dagger, 1960–1968
- F-84F Thunderstreak, 1968–1969
- F-100D Super Sabre, 1970–1978
- F-4C Phantom II, 1979–1986
- Block 15 F-16A/B Fighting Falcon, 1986–1996
- Block 25 F-16C/D Fighting Falcon, 1996–1998
- Block 30 F-16C/D Fighting Falcon, 1998–present
