= 149th Fighter Wing =

149th Fighter Wing

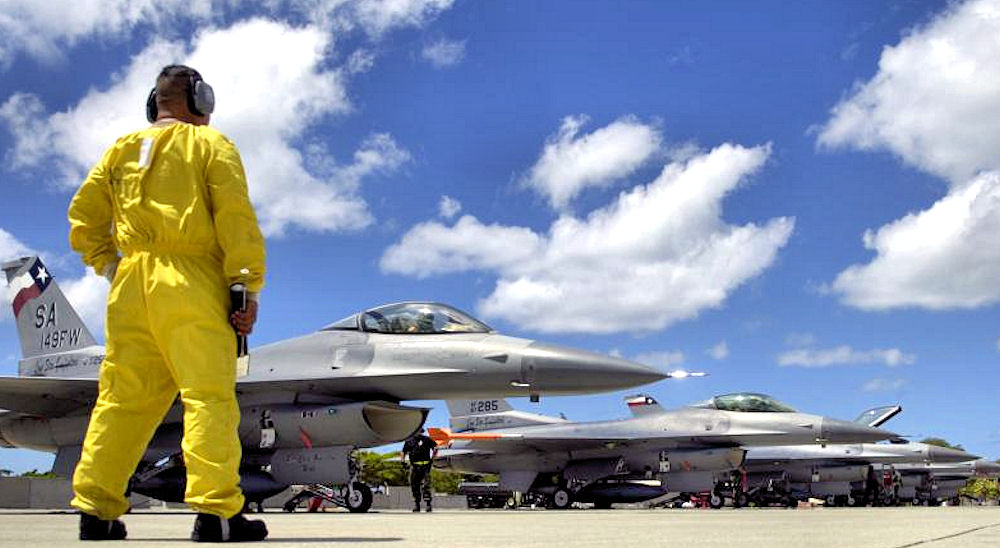
- A group crew chief waits for his F-16 to shut down its engine before conducting his post flight checks at Hickam AFB, Hawaii (Note: Six F-16s from the 149th Fighter Wing came to Hickam to participate in Exercise Sentry Aloha on 8 September 2006.)
- Active: 1960–1969; 1969–present
- Country: United States
- Allegiance: Texas
- Branch: Air National Guard
- Type: Wing
- Role: Fighter training
- Part of: Texas Air National Guard
- Garrison/HQ: Lackland Air Force Base, Kelly Field Annex, Joint Base San Antonio, Texas
- Decorations: Air Force Outstanding Unit Award

Insignia
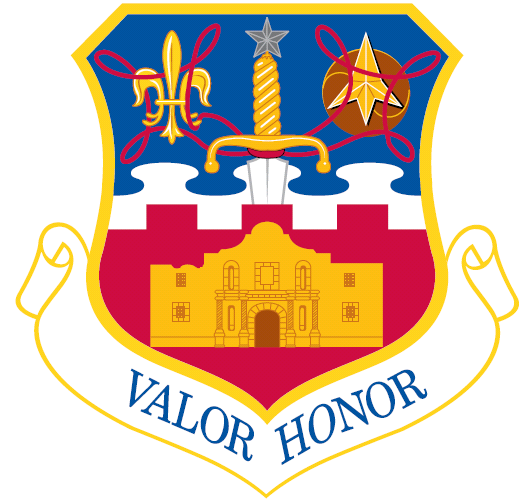
- 149th Fighter Wing emblem

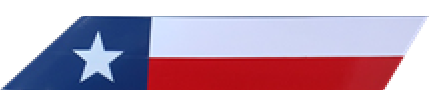
- Tail stripe
- Tail code: SA

The 149th Fighter Wing is a unit of the Texas Air National Guard, stationed at Kelly Field Annex, Joint Base San Antonio, Texas. If activated to federal service, the wing is gained by the United States Air Force Air Combat Command.

The wing traces its history to the establishment of the 149th Fighter Group in 1960, through it became a wing only in 1995. It is an F-16 flying training unit that includes a support group with a worldwide mobility commitment. The cornerstone of the 149th’s flying mission is the 182nd Fighter Squadron, whose role is to take pilots, either experienced aircrew or recent graduates from USAF undergraduate pilot training, and qualify them to fly the F-16 Fighting Falcon.

== Units ==
The 149th Fighter Wing consists of the following units:

- 149th Operations Group

182nd Fighter Squadron

- 149th Maintenance Group
- 149th Mission Support Group

149th Security Forces Squadron

- 149th Medical Group

In addition, the 149th has four geographically separated units:

- 203rd Ground Combat Training Squadron
- 204th Security Forces Squadron
- 209th Weather Flight
- 273d Information Operations Squadron.

== History ==
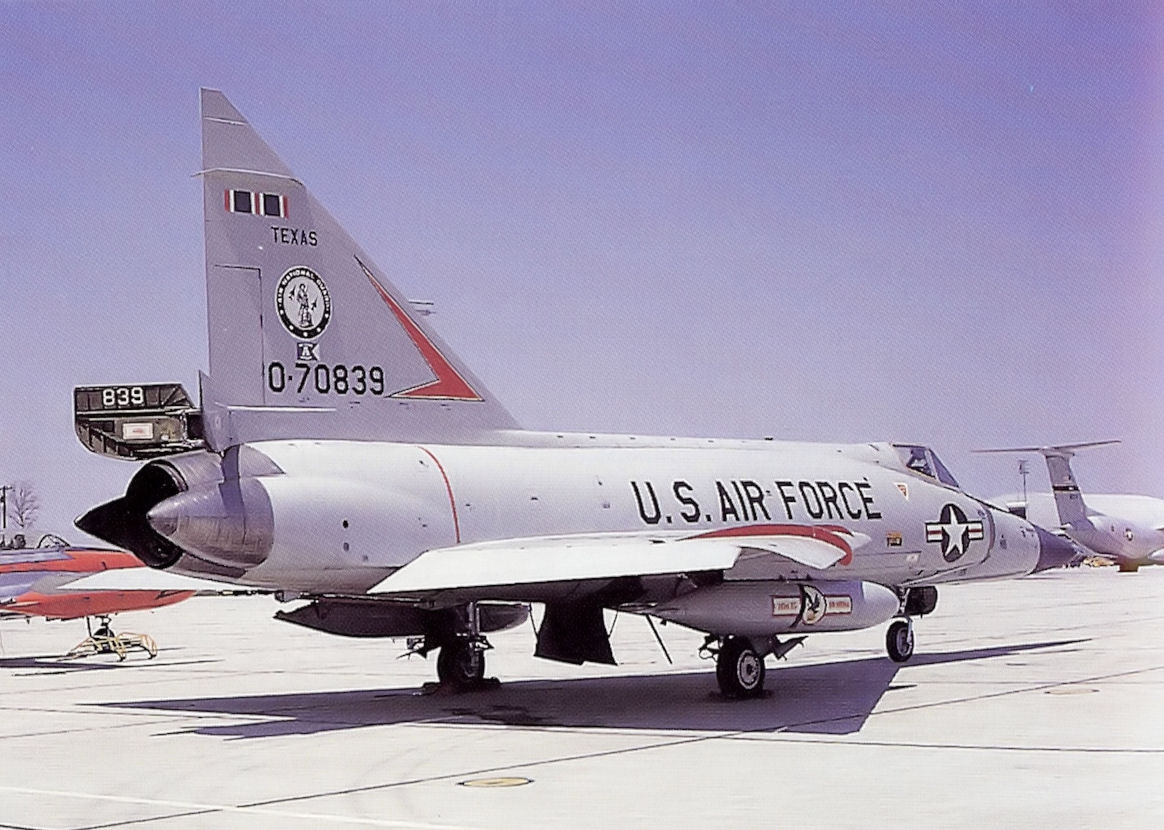
182d Fighter Interceptor Squadron – Convair F-102A 57-839

In August 1961, as part of an Air Defense Command re-organization, the 182d Fighter Interceptor Squadron's assignment to 136th Air Defense Wing was terminated with the 136th being transferred to Tactical Air Command. As a result, the 182d was authorized to expand to a group level, and the 149th Fighter Group (Air Defense) was established by the National Guard Bureau. The 182d Fighter Interceptor Squadron became the group's flying squadron. Other s quadrons assigned into the group were the 149th Headquarters, 149th Material Squadron (Maintenance), 149th Combat Support Squadron, and the 149th USAF Dispensary. The 149th was directly assigned to the Texas Air National Guard, being operationally gained by the Air Defense Command 33d Air Division.

Equipped with the F-102 Delta Dagger interceptor, as with many other ANG squadrons the 182d temporally operated two TF-102 twin-seat trainers for ANG F-102 pilots while remaining on runway alert status. Also, the squadron operated T-33A Shooting Star jet trainers and a Convair VT-29 transport for courier duties.

=== Tactical Air Support ===
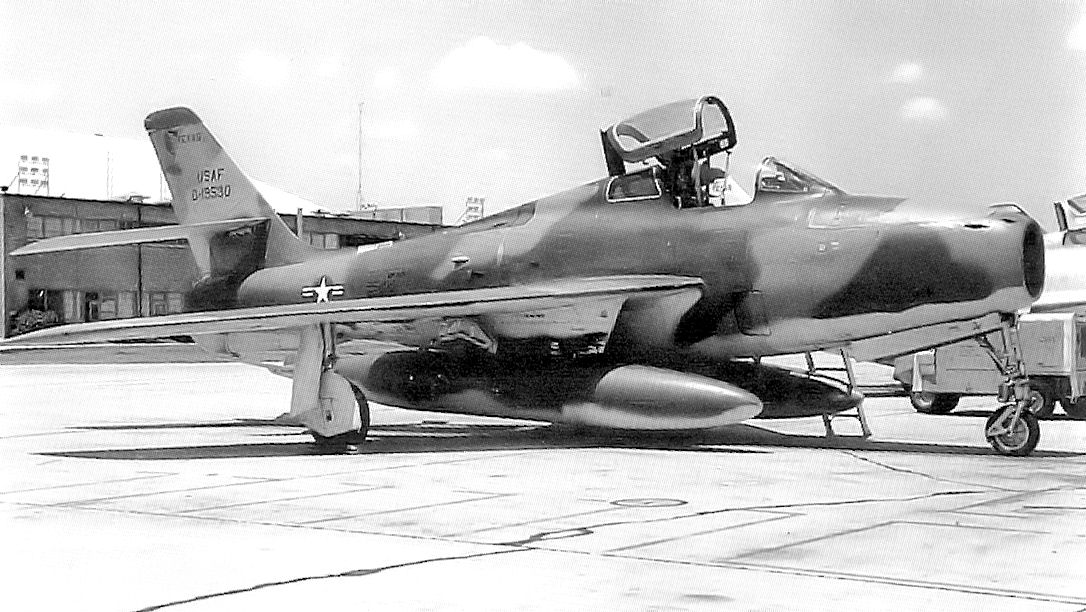
Rare photo of the F-84F Thunderstreak (F-84F 51-9530) flown by the 182d Tactical Fighter Squadron in 1969.

In 1968, the Air National Guard began to retire its F-102s and the 182d was ordered to send their aircraft to Davis-Monthan Air Force Base for storage at AMARC. In July, as part of the drawdown of continental fighter air defense, the 149th FIG was transferred from Aerospace Defense Command to Tactical Air Command, with the group and 182d being redesignated as the 182d Tactical Fighter Group and squadron.

As an interim measure, the 182d Tactical Fighter Squadron was re-equipped with obsolescent F-84F Thunderstreak by TAC. The squadron was the second-to-last ANG squadron to fly the F-84F. During the summer of 1971 the 182d began to receive F-100D/F Super Sabre tactical fighter bombers. The 182d was one of the first ANG squadrons to receive the Super Sabre, as most were being operated in South Vietnam at the time. The F-100s received by the squadron were aircraft being withdrawn from the 20th Tactical Fighter Wing at RAF Wethersfield, England, when Wethersfield was being closed for flight operations, and the wing being re-equipped with the new General Dynamics F-111 at a new base, RAF Upper Heyford.

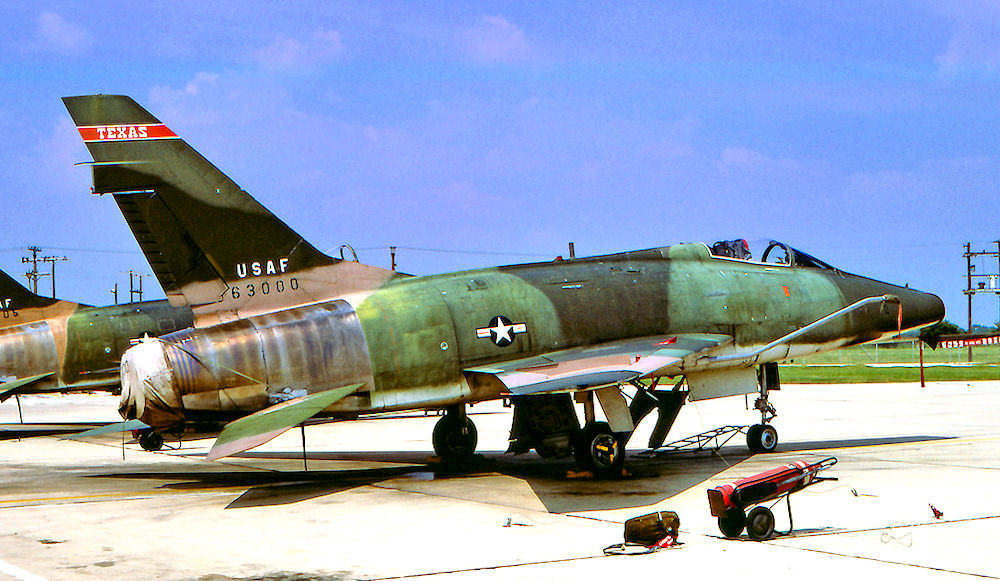
The famous "triple null" F-100D 56-3000, while assigned to the 182d TFS in the early 1970s.

The Super Sabre was dedicated fighter-bomber, with no concession being made to a secondary air-superiority role and the squadron trained in using the fighter for ground support. Beginning in 1975, the 182d began a NATO commitment, with squadron aircraft and personnel deploying to the United States Air Forces in Europe for Autumn Forge/Cold Fire/Reforger exercises.

By 1979, the Super Sabres were being retired, and were replaced by McDonnell F-4C Phantom IIs, largely Vietnam War veteran aircraft, that were made available to the Air National Guard. With the Phantom, the 182d continued their tactical fighter mission with the more capable aircraft. The squadron also continued its NATO deployments, exercising at USAFE bases in West Germany, England, the Netherlands and Denmark.

In 1986, the Phantoms were reaching the end of the operational service, and they were replaced by the F-16A Fighting Falcon. The F-16s were transferred from the 347th Tactical Fighter Wing, Moody Air Force Base, Georgia. Initially the squadron began to receive Block 15 single-seat F-16As, and a few twin-seat F-16Bs. The Block 15 was the major production model of the F-16A. The F-16s received were modified the Air National Guard's new priority in the 1980s, when it was assigned the primary responsibility of the aerial defense of the continental United States. The aircraft received were the F-16A Air Defense (ADF) variant, being equipped with HF radio and an improved APG-66 radar that was compatible with the AIM-7 Sparrow and AIM-120 AMRAAM radar-guided missiles for air-to-air interceptor missions. A spotlight was installed on the side of the nose to aid in the identification of nighttime intruders. At its peak, the ANG ADF force equipped a defensive chain which surrounded the entire perimeter of the continental United States.

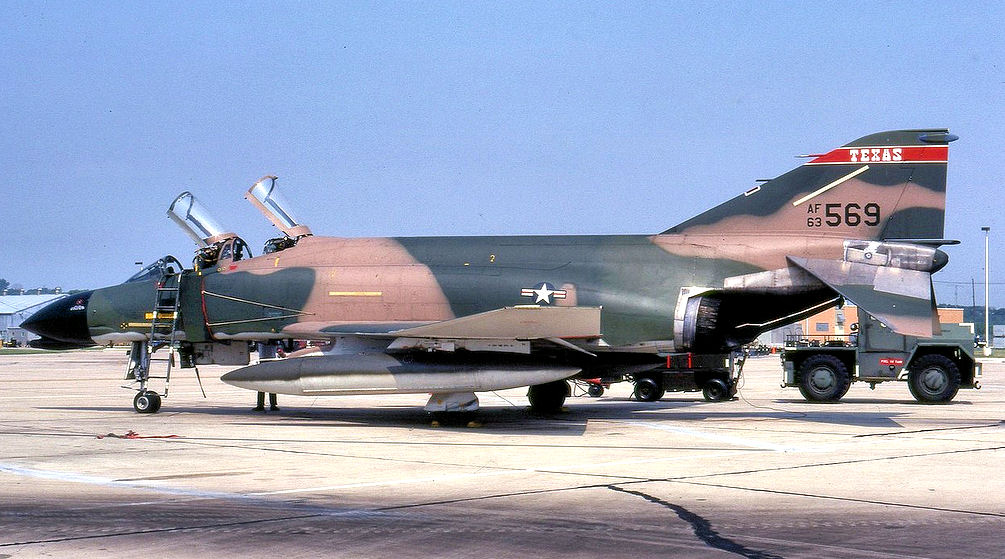
182d Tactical Fighter Squadron – McDonnell F-4C-19-MC Phantom 63-7569.

Higher-performance Block 25 F-16C/D aircraft replaced the Block 15 A/B model aircraft in 1996. Although similar in appearance to the earlier models, the Block 25 aircraft were a considerable advancement with the Westinghouse AN/APG-68(V) multi-mode radar with better range, sharper resolution, and expanded operating modes. The planar array in the nose provides numerous air-to-air modes, including range-while-search, uplook and velocity search, single target track, raid cluster resolution, and track-while-scan for up to 10 targets. The radar was capable of handling the guidance of the AGM-65 Maverick air-to-surface missile. Upgraded engines made the aircraft capable of Mach-2 performance.

However, the Block 25 aircraft were all powered by the Pratt & Whitney F100-PW-200 turbofan, which were prone to engine stalls. In 1998, the squadron received Block 30 aircraft, with wider intakes and the General Electric F-110 engine. However, by the mid-1990s and with the end of the Cold War, there appeared to be no longer any threat to America's homeland from bombers or cruise missiles.

=== Twenty-first century ===
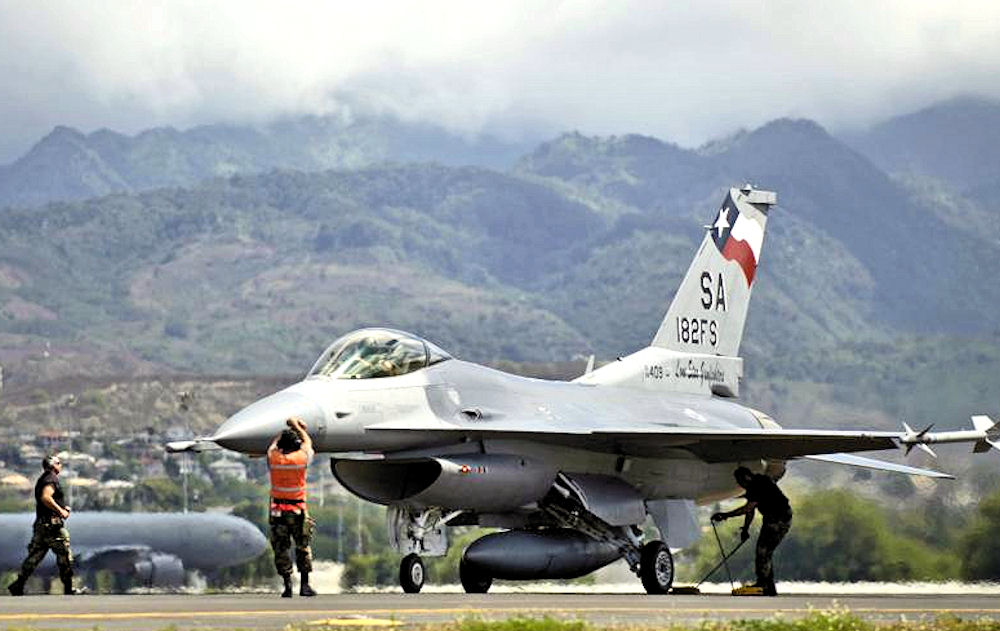
Crew chiefs recover their F-16 after it returned to Hickam AFB, Hawaii from an air-to-air mission on 8 September 2006, during Exercise Sentry Aloha.

In 1999, the mission of the 149th Fighter Group was changed from air combat to becoming a Formal Training Unit for Air National Guard F-16 pilots under Air Education and Training Command. The 182d trains active duty, Air National Guard, and Reserve F-16 pilots, including recent graduates from USAF Undergraduate Pilot Training making them combat ready upon graduation of a 9-month course. Almost all instructor pilots within the unit are former active duty F-16 pilots.

DoD recommended as part of the 2005 Base Realignment and Closure Commission that the 178th Fighter Wing, Ohio Air National Guard be shifted to General Atomics MQ-1 Predators and transfer six additional Block 30 F-16 aircraft to the 182d Fighter Squadron. This recommendation was made because Lackland (Kelly Annex) (47) had higher military value than Springfield-Beckley AGB (128). This recommendation also would optimize the squadron size of the 182d, the only ANG F-16 Flying Training Unit.

The squadron's Block 30 aircraft, manufactured between 1987 and 1989 are currently reaching the end of their service life. They have been certified by Boeing though at least 2015, however it is unclear what aircraft or what the mission of the unit will transition to in the future.

The 217th Intelligence Training Squadron (P), despite having a classic associate relationship with Air Education and Training Command, was inactivated.

=== Lineage ===
149th Fighter Group

- Established as the 149th Fighter Group (Air Defense) and allotted the National Guard Bureau on 24 June 1960

Extended federal recognition on 1 July 1960
Inactivated on 13 September 1969
Consolidated with the 149th Fighter Group on 19 August 1987

149th Fighter Wing
Established as the 149th Tactical Fighter Group on 16 May 1969
Activated on 13 September 1969
Consolidated with the 149th Fighter Group (Air Defense) on 19 August 1987
Redesignated 149th Fighter Group on 16 March 1992
Redesignated 149th Fighter Wing c. 16 March 1994

=== Assignments ===
- Texas Air National Guard, 1 August 1961

Gained by: 33d Air Division, Air Defense Command
Gained by: Oklahoma City Air Defense Sector, Air Defense Command, 25 June 1963
Gained by: 31st Air Division, Air Defense Command, 1 April 1966
Gained by: 31st Air Division, Aerospace Defense Command, 15 January 1968
Gained by: Tactical Air Command, 1 July 1968
Gained by: Air Combat Command, 1 June 1992
Gained by: Air Education and Training Command, 1 July 1999–Present

=== Components ===
- 149th Operations Group, c. 16 March 1994 – present
- 182d Fighter-Interceptor Squadron (later 182nd Tactical Fighter Squadron, 182nd Fighter Squadron), 1 August 1961 – c. 16 March 1994

=== Stations ===
- San Antonio Airport, 1 July 196)0
- Kelly Air Force Base (later Kelly Field Annex, Joint Base San Antonio-Lackland), San Antonio, Texas, 1 August 1961 – present

=== Aircraft ===
- F-102A Delta Dagger, 1960–1968
- F-84F Thunderstreak, 1968–1969
- F-100D Super Sabre, 1970–1978
- F-4C Phantom II, 1979–1986
- Block 15 F-16A/B Fighting Falcon, 1986–1996
- Block 25 F-16C/D Fighting Falcon, 1996–1998
- Block 30 F-16C/D Fighting Falcon, 1998–present

=== Decorations ===
- Air Force Outstanding Unit Award
