= Texas Air National Guard =

- Emblem of the Texas Air National Guard
- Founded: 29 June 1923; 103 years ago
- Country: United States
- Allegiance: State of Texas
- Branch: Air National Guard
- Type: Reserve force, state militia
- Role: "To meet state and federal mission responsibilities"
- Size: 3,170 (2017)
- Part of: Texas Military Department: Texas Military Forces; National Guard Bureau
- Headquarters: Building Nine; Camp Mabry, Austin, Texas; 30°18′42.173″N 97°45′38.338″W
- Motto: Decisive first responders
- March: "Texas, Our Texas"
- Website: tmd.texas.gov/air-guard

Commanders
- Civilian leadership: President Donald Trump (Commander-in-Chief); Troy Meink (Secretary of the Air Force); Governor Greg Abbott (Governor of Texas)
- Adjutant General: Major General Thomas Suelzer
- Commanding General: Brigadier General Andrew Camacho
- Senior Enlisted Advisor: Chief Master Sergeant Matthew Crawford

Insignia
- Seal

- Shield

Aircraft flown
- Attack: MQ-9 Reaper
- Fighter: F-16C/D Fighting Falcon
- Transport: C-130H Hercules, Beechcraft C-12 Huron, RC-26B

The Texas Air National Guard (TX ANG) is the aerial militia of the U.S. state of Texas. It is a reserve of the United States Air Force (USAF) and part of the Texas National Guard, alongside the Texas Army National Guard. No element of the Texas Air National Guard is under United States Air Force command. They are under the jurisdiction of the governor of Texas through the office of the Texas adjutant general unless they are federalized by order of the president of the United States. The Texas Air National Guard is headquartered at Camp Mabry, Austin, and its chief of staff is Brigadier General Matthew Barker.

Under the "Total Force" concept, Texas Air National Guard units are considered to be an Air Reserve Component (ARC) of the USAF. Texas ANG units are trained and equipped by the Air Force and are operationally gained by a major command of the USAF if federalized. In addition, the Texas Air National Guard forces are assigned to Air Expeditionary Forces and are subject to deployment tasking orders along with their active duty and Air Force Reserve counterparts in their assigned cycle deployment window.

Along with their federal reserve obligations, as state militia units the elements of the Texas ANG are subject to being activated by order of the governor to provide protection of life and property, and preserve peace, order and public safety. State missions include disaster relief in times of earthquakes, hurricanes, floods and forest fires, search and rescue, protection of vital public services, and support to civil defense.

== Components ==
The Texas Air National Guard consists of the following major units:

- 136th Airlift Wing

Established 27 January 1947 (as 181st Fighter Squadron); operates: C-130H Hercules
The 136 AW will upgrade to the C-130J in 2023.
Stationed at: Carswell Field, Naval Air Station Joint Reserve Base Fort Worth.
Gained by: Air Mobility Command
The 136th AW mission is tactical airlift. The aircraft is capable of operating from rough, dirt strips and is the prime transport for air dropping troops and equipment into hostile areas.

- 147th Attack Wing

Established 29 June 1923 (as 111th Observation Squadron); operates: MQ-9 Reaper
Stationed at: Ellington Field Joint Reserve Base, Houston
Gained by: Air Combat Command
The 147th Attack Wing provides flies combat support missions 24/7 via advanced satellite communications thus providing surveillance, reconnaissance, and air support for US and Allied forces. In conducting combat support sorties, the 147 ATKW provides theater and national-level leadership with critical real-time Intelligence, Surveillance, and Reconnaissance and air-to-ground munitions and strike capability. A collocated Air Support Operations Squadron provides terminal control for weapons employment in a close air support scenario integrating combat air and ground operations.

- 149th Fighter Wing

Established 27 January 1947 (as 182d Fighter Squadron); operates: F-16C/D Fighting Falcon
Stationed at: Kelly Field Annex, Joint Base San Antonio
Gained by: Air Combat Command
The unit is an F-16 flying training unit that includes a support group with a worldwide mobility commitment.

Support Unit Functions and Capabilities:

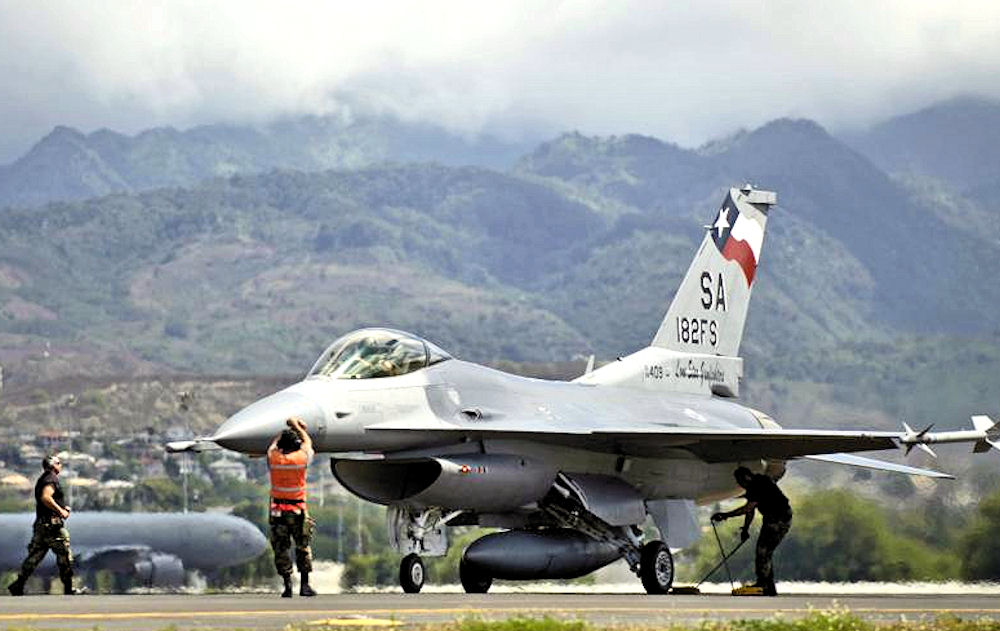
F-16 of the 182d Fighter Squadron at Hickam AFB in 2006

- Texas Air National Guard Headquarters

Texas Air National Guard Headquarters at Camp Mabry in Austin includes the state headquarters staff whose mission is to provide command and control of Texas Air Guard units.

- Air Component Command - TXSG

The Air Component Command of the Texas State Guard directly supports and extends the mission and operations of the Texas Air National Guard and serves the State of Texas directly as a volunteer command in the Texas Military Forces. AirCC units are embedded with their parent Texas Air National Guard units in San Antonio, Austin, Ft. Worth, Garland, Houston and La Porte.

- 254th Combat Communications Group

The 254th Combat Communications Group is located in Grand Prairie and provides worldwide command, control, communications and computer systems, information management and combat support critical to war fighting capabilities. The 254th's primary mission is to provide planning and engineering for Combat Communications Squadrons that provide tactical (high-frequency radio, telephone, satellite and network) communications and terminal air traffic control services to support emergency U.S. Air Force requirements. The 254th provides a staff element for management of communications personnel and equipment when deployed in support of Air Force missions worldwide in locations where these capabilities don't exist, and are prepared to do so under hostile conditions and during peacetime as well. The 254th commands six squadrons across Texas, Oklahoma and Louisiana - the 221st and 236th Combat Communications Squadrons and the 205th, 214th, 219th and 272nd Engineering and Installation Squadrons.

- 204th Security Forces Squadron

The 204th Security Forces Squadron located at Biggs Army Airfield, Fort Bliss, El Paso. They are the only heavy weapons security forces unit in the Air National Guard. Since the September 11 attacks, members of the 204th SFS have seen duty in central and southwest Asia, in Africa and even on board ship in the Persian Gulf. They have served on installations in several states in the U.S. and taught military base defense in Latin American countries.

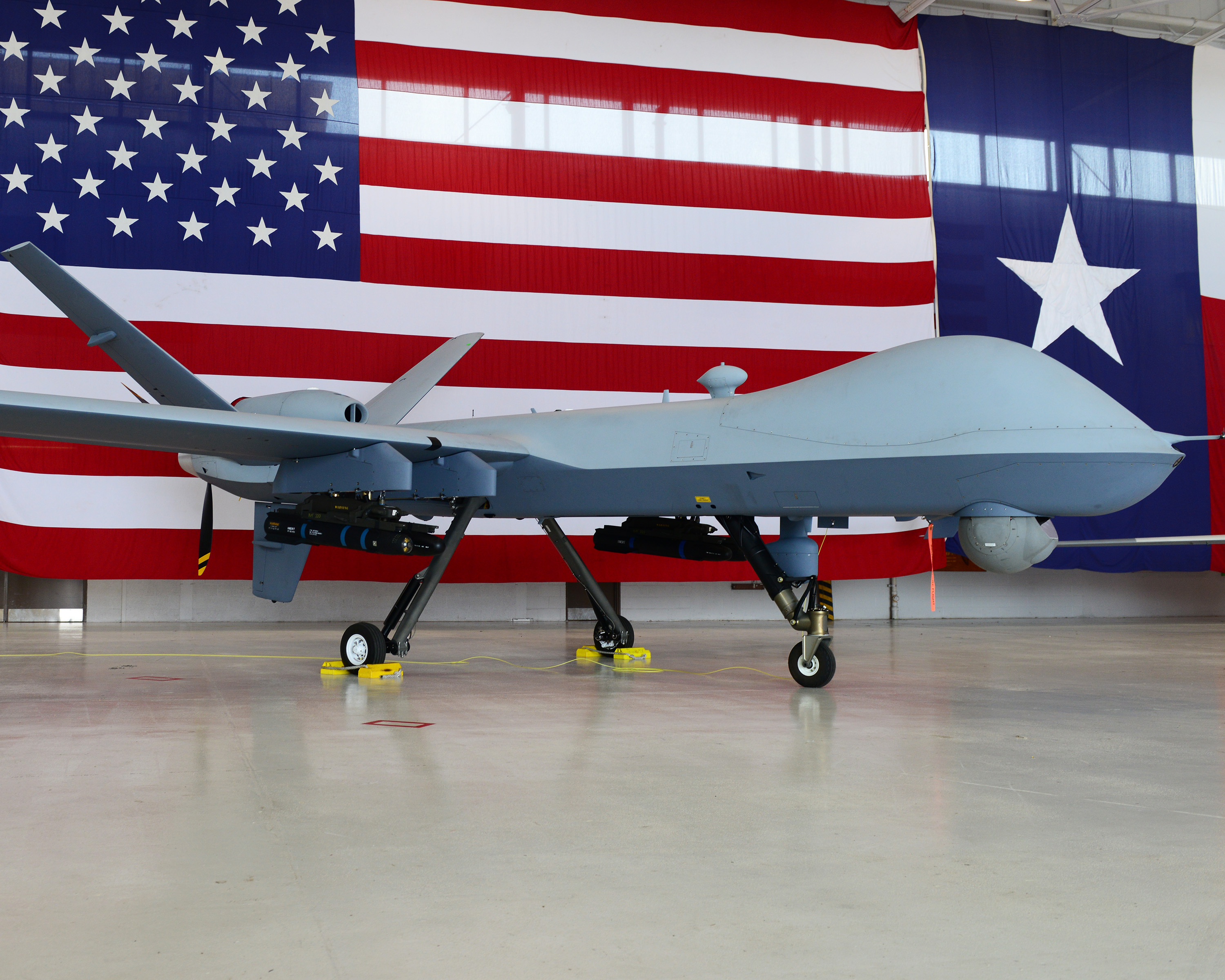
- An MQ-9 Reaper of the 147th Attack Wing
  217th Training Squadron (Inactivated)

The 217th TRS (Nighthawks) was an intelligence training unit subordinate to the 149th Fighter Wing at Lackland AFB, Texas. The 217th TRS was a GSU (geographically separated unit) located at Goodfellow AFB, Texas. The unit stood up officially on August 15, 2008 as a unit that works directly for and with the following active duty units: 315 Training Squadron, 316 Training Squadron, and 17 Training Support Squadron, under the 17th Training Group (TRG). 217 TRS instructors were integrated into the existing courses taught within the 17 TRG - primarily the 315 TRS. The main purpose of the unit was to provide additional instructors to Air Education and Training Command (AETC) and the 17th Training Group to further augment the active duty cadre, bring additional experience and continuity to the intelligence courses, and continue with the Department of Defense's vision of "total force integration". Although some 217th TRS instructors were drill status guardsmen, most were full-time air technicians. Lieutenant Colonel James W. Marrs became the first commander of the newly formed 217th Training Squadron upon its activation. The unit was inactivated September 7, 2013

- 221st Combat Communications Squadron

The 221st Combat Communications Squadron is co-located in Grand Prairie with their command unit, the 254th Combat Communications Group. The function of the 221st Combat Communications Squadron is to provide communications in a deployed environment. Such requirements may include establishing a Local Area Network, Telephone Network, Wide Area Network, and Radio Communications. All this while ensuring reliable connectivity for those parties serviced and maintaining mission effectiveness.

- 273d Information Operations Squadron

The 273d Information Operations Squadron, located in San Antonio (Port of San Antonio), provides support to two active duty units (23d Information Operations Squadron and 346th Test Squadron) conducting Information Operations tactics and testing to help defend United States Air Force networks. Securing the AF gateways against IO attacks. It is subordinate to the 149th Fighter Wing located on Lackland AFB.

== History ==
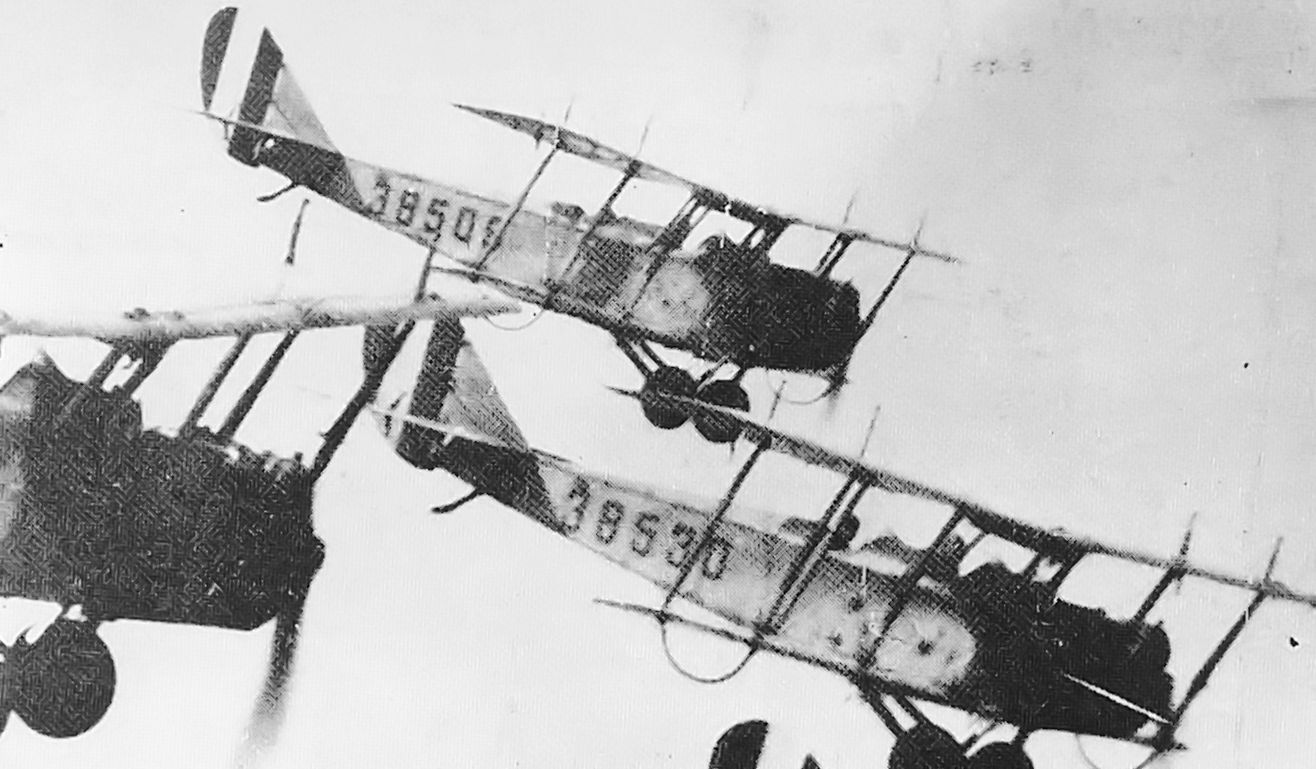
Curtiss JN-4 Jennies of the 111th Observation Squadron, 1925

The Texas Air National Guard origins date to 14 August 1917 with the establishment of the 111th Aero Squadron as part of the World War I United States Army Air Service. The 111th served at Kelly Field, San Antonio, then after the 1918 Armistice with Germany was demobilized in 1919.

The Militia Act of 1903 established the present National Guard system, units raised by the states but paid for by the Federal Government, liable for immediate state service. If federalized by presidential order, they fall under the regular military chain of command. On 1 June 1920, the Militia Bureau issued Circular No.1 on organization of National Guard air units.

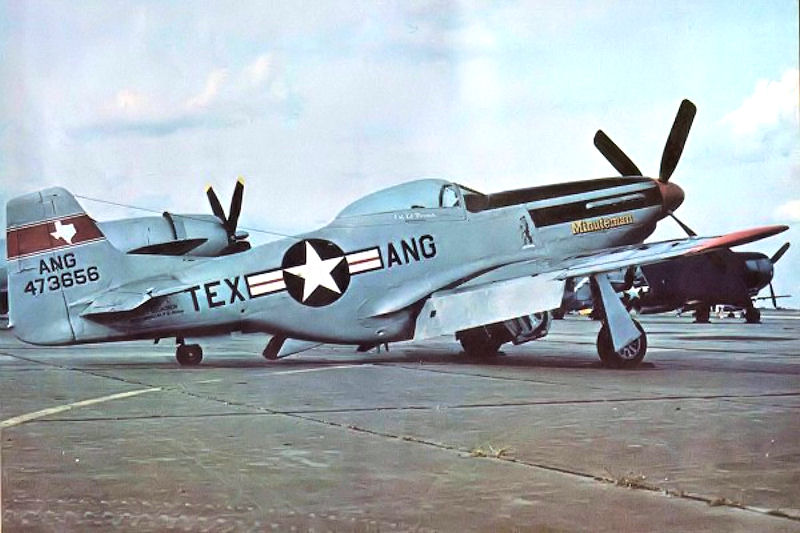
A North American F-51D Mustang of the 111th Fighter Squadron at Ellington Field, Houston, 1948

The unit was reorganized with the establishment of a permanent air service in 1920, forming in the old Houston Light Guard Armory. The 111th Observation Squadron received Federal Recognition on 29 June 1923, as part of the 36th Division, Texas Air National Guard. It is one of the 29 original National Guard Observation Squadrons of the United States Army National Guard formed before World War II. The 111th Observation Squadron was ordered into active service on 25 November 1940 as part of the buildup of the Army Air Corps prior to the United States entry into World War II.

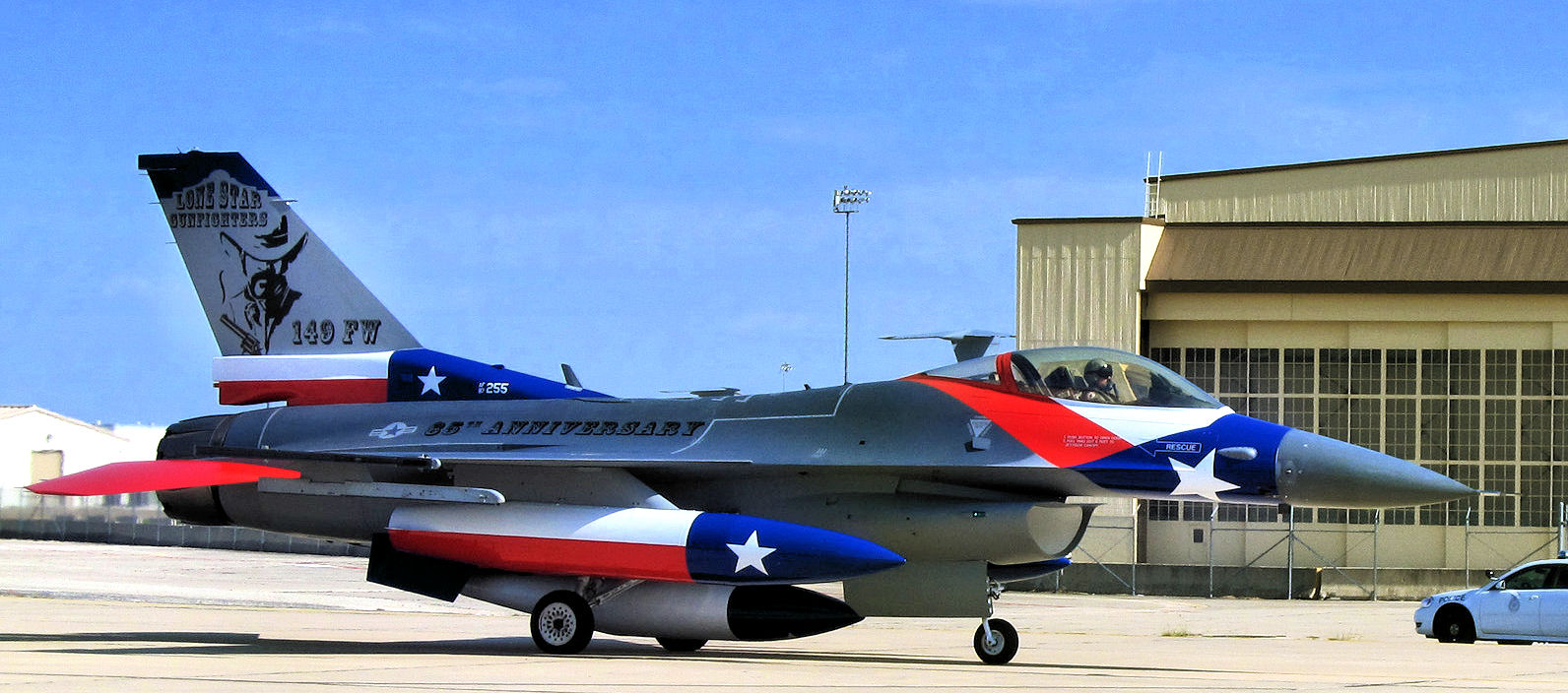
182d Fighter Squadron F-16C in 2011, returning to Lackland Air Force Base

On 24 May 1946, the United States Army Air Forces, in response to dramatic postwar military budget cuts imposed by President Harry S. Truman, allocated inactive unit designations to the National Guard Bureau for the formation of an Air Force National Guard. These unit designations were allotted and transferred to various State National Guard bureaus to provide them unit designations to re-establish them as Air National Guard units. The modern Texas ANG received federal recognition on 27 January 1947 as the 136th Fighter Group at Love Field Airport, Dallas. It's 181st Fighter Squadron was equipped with F-51D Mustangs and its mission was the air defense of the state. Other units assigned to the 136th in 1947 were the 111th Fighter Squadron at Ellington Field, Houston, and the 182d Fighter Squadron at Kelly Field, San Antonio. They were also equipped with F-51D Mustangs. 18 September 1947, however, is considered the Texas Air National Guard's official birth concurrent with the establishment of the United States Air Force as a separate branch of the United States military under the National Security Act.

On 1 July 1957 the 111th Fighter-Interceptor Squadron in Houston was authorized to expand to a group level, and the 147th Fighter Group (Air Defense) was allotted by the National Guard Bureau, extended federal recognition and activated. On 1 August 1961 the 182d FIS in San Antonio was expanded to become the 149th Fighter-Interceptor Group.

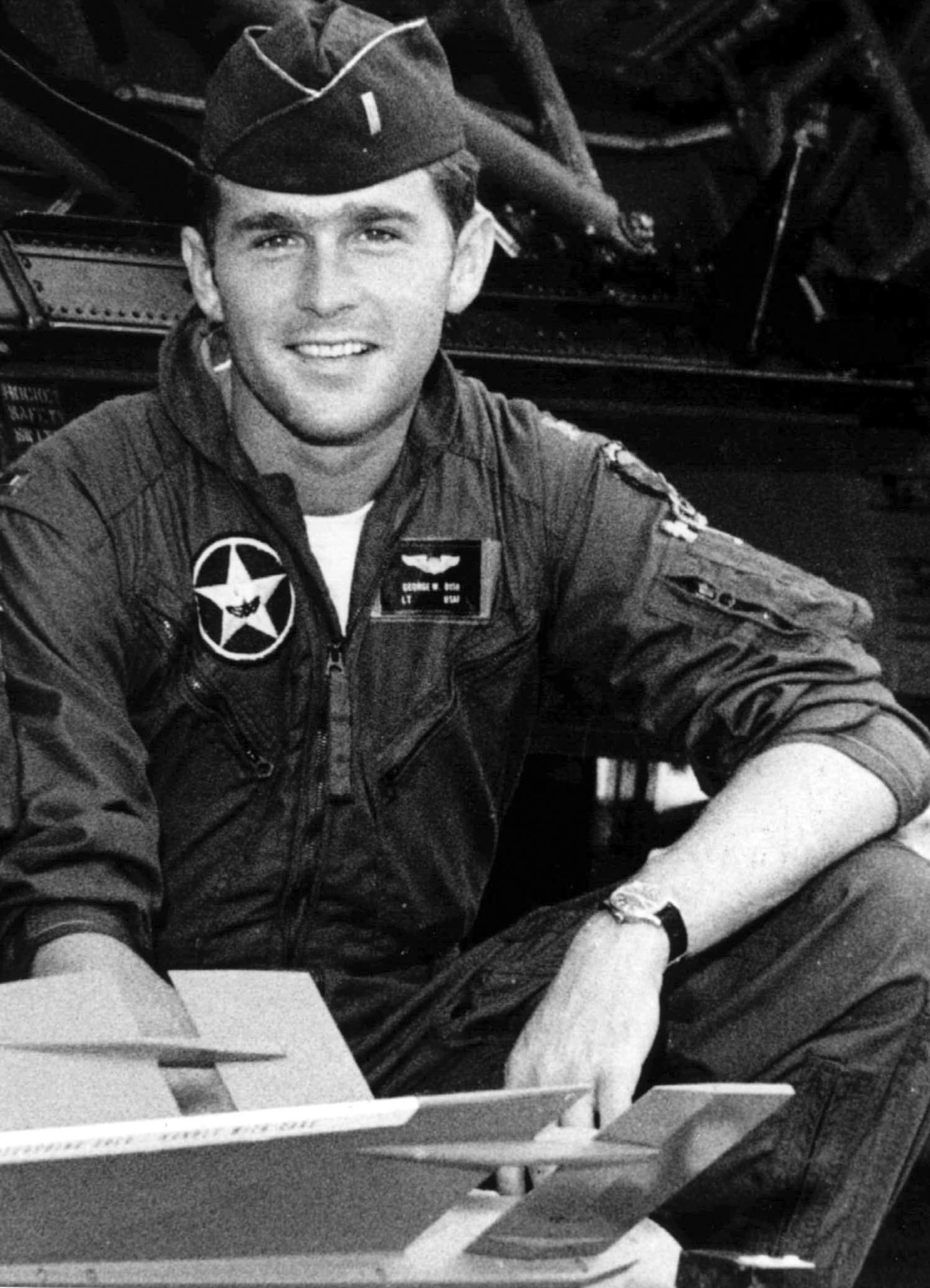
Lt. George W. Bush during his Texas Air Guard service as an F-102 pilot in the 111th Fighter-Interceptor Squadron

Today, the 136th Airlift Wing (136 AW) provides global airlift for Air Mobility Command; the 147th Attack Wing (147 AW) flies the MQ-9 Reaper reconnaissance/strike RPA and the 149th Fighter Wing (149 FW) flies the Block 30 F-16C/D Fighting Falcon tactical fighter-bomber.

From 2001 through 2007, elements of every Air National Guard unit in Texas were activated in support of the Global War on Terror. Flight crews, aircraft maintenance personnel, communications technicians, air controllers and air security personnel deployed to Iraq, Afghanistan, Qatar, Israel, and other locations throughout Southwest Asia. Additionally, in 2005 elements of all the units were activated to provide relief after Hurricane Katrina and Hurricane Rita.

=== Notable former members ===
- George W. Bush, 43rd President of the United States, former Governor of Texas
- Congressman Charlie Gonzalez
- Brigadier General David Lee "Tex" Hill
- Congressman Ron Paul
- Lieutenant General Daniel James III, former director, Air National Guard
- General Joseph L. Lengyel, Chief National Guard Bureau

== See also ==
- Texas Wing Civil Air Patrol
