= Houston Municipal Airport =

Airport in Mississippi, US

- IATA: none; ICAO: none; FAA LID: M44

Summary
- Airport type: Public
- Owner: City of Houston
- Serves: Houston, Mississippi
- Elevation AMSL: 337 ft (103 m)
- Coordinates: 33°53′11″N 089°01′23″W

Map
- Location of airport in Mississippi M44 (the United States)

Runways
Direction	Length		Surface
Direction	ft	m	Surface
3/21	4,400	1,341	Asphalt

Statistics (2011)
- Aircraft operations: 15,200
- Based aircraft: 11
- Source: Federal Aviation Administration

Houston Municipal Airport (FAA LID: M44) is a public use airport in Chickasaw County, Mississippi, United States. It is owned by the City of Houston and located two nautical miles (4 km) southwest of its central business district. This airport is included in the National Plan of Integrated Airport Systems for 2011–2015, which categorized it as a general aviation facility.

== Facilities and aircraft ==
Houston Municipal Airport covers an area of 84 acres (34 ha) at an elevation of 337 feet (103 m) above mean sea level. It has one runway designated 3/21 with an asphalt surface measuring 4,400 by 75 feet (1,341 x 23 m).

For the 12-month period ending November 30, 2011, the airport had 15,200 aircraft operations, an average of 41 per day: 93% general aviation and 7% military. At that time there were 11 aircraft based at this airport: 91% single-engine and 9% ultralight.

== See also ==
- List of airports in Mississippi
