= 136th Regiment =

136th Regiment may refer to:

- 136th Heavy Anti-Aircraft Regiment, Royal Artillery
- 136th Infantry Regiment (United States)

== American Civil War regiments ==
- 136th Illinois Infantry Regiment
- 136th Indiana Infantry Regiment
- 136th New York Infantry Regiment
- 136th Ohio Infantry Regiment
- 136th Pennsylvania Infantry Regiment
- 136th United States Colored Infantry Regiment

== See also ==
- 136th Brigade (disambiguation)
- 136th Division (disambiguation)
- 136th (disambiguation)
