= 136 =

136 may refer to:

- 136 (number), the natural number following 135 and preceding 137
- AD 136
- 136 BC
- 136 Austria, a main-belt asteroid
- Škoda 136, a small family car

== See also ==
- 136th (disambiguation)
