= 136th Civil Engineer Squadron =

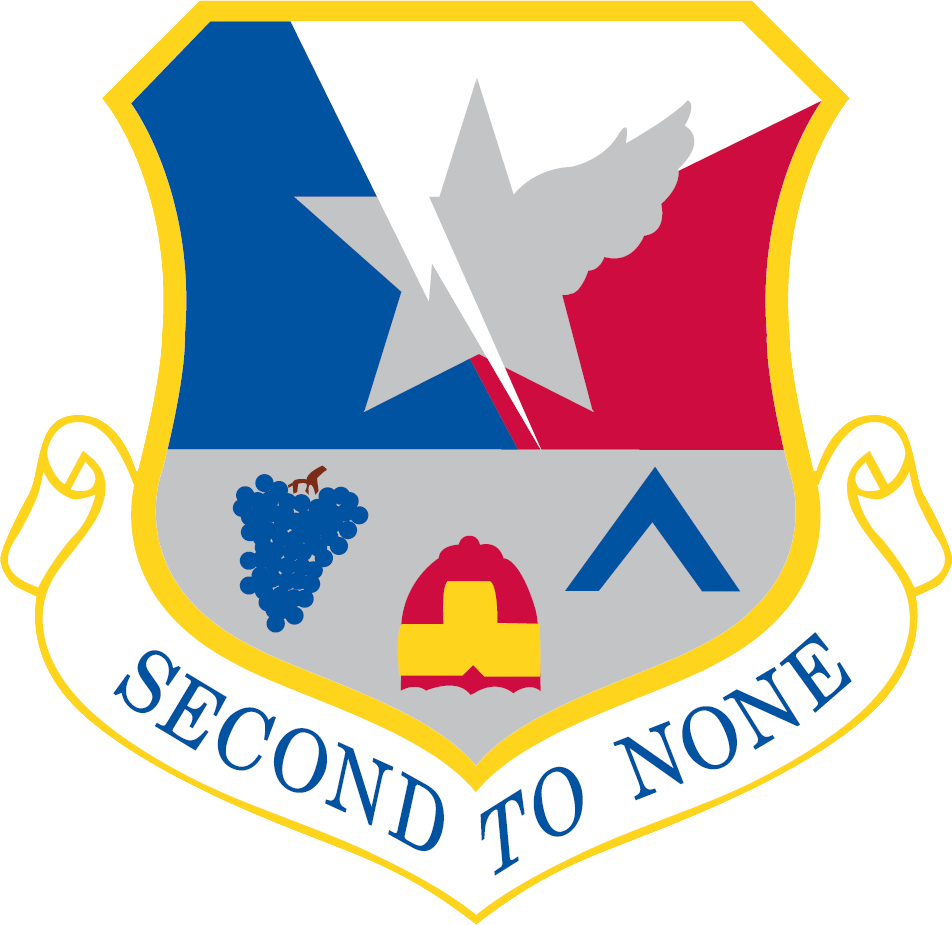
- 136th Airlift Wing emblem
- Active: 1969–present
- Country: United States
- Allegiance: Texas
- Branch: Air National Guard
- Type: Squadron
- Role: Engineering
- Part of: Texas Air National Guard
- Garrison/HQ: Naval Air Station Joint Reserve Base Fort Worth, Texas
- Nickname: Prime BEEF
- Motto: CAN DO! WILL DO!

The 136th Civil Engineer Squadron (136 CES) is a unit of the 136th Airlift Wing, Texas Air National Guard, Texas Military Forces stationed at Naval Air Station Fort Worth Joint Reserve Base, Fort Worth, Texas. If activated to federal service, the Squadron is gained by the United States Air Force Air Mobility Command.

== Lineage ==
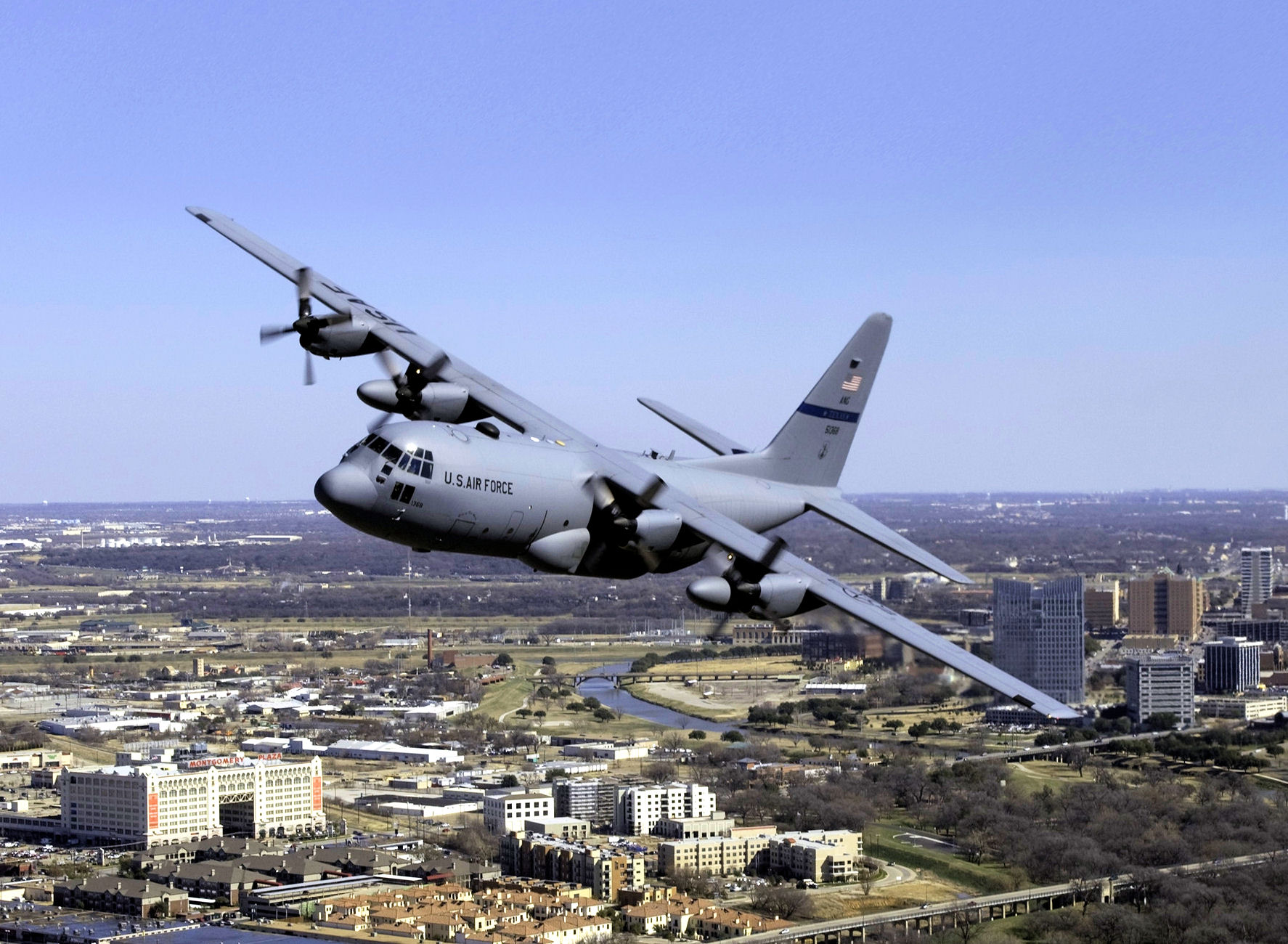
136th Airlift Wing C-130H over Fort Worth, Texas

- Constituted as 136th Civil Engineering Flight on 1 October 1969
- Assignment to National Guard Bureau on 1 October 1969
- Extended Federal Recognition on 1 November 1969
- Assigned to Texas Air National Guard on 1 November 1969
- Assigned to 136th Tactical Airlift Wing on 1 November 1969
- Stationed at Naval Air Station Dallas, Hensley Field on 1 November 1969
- Re-Designated as 136th Civil Engineering Squadron on 1 July 1985
- Assigned to Air Combat Command on 1 October 1993
- Re-Designated as 136th Civil Engineer Squadron on 1 March 1994
- Assigned to Air Mobility Command on 1 April 1997
- Stationed at Naval Air Station Fort Worth Joint Reserve Base on 27 April 1999

== Decorations ==
- Air Force Outstanding Unit Award
- 1972 (1 May 1969 – 30 Apr 1977) (136ARW)
- 1985 (1 Jan 1980 – 1 Aug 1982) (136CEF)
- 1985 (1 Jan 1983 – 31 Dec 1984) (136AW)
- 1991 (1 Sep 1989 – 1 Jun 1991) (136AW)
- 2009 (1 Oct 2006 – 30 Sep 2008) (136CES)
- 2015 (1 Oct 2012 – 30 Sep 2014) (136AW)
- Texas Governor's Unit Citation
