= 221st Combat Communications Squadron =

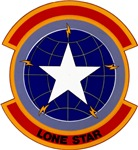
- 221st Combat Communications Squadron emblem
- Active: 1952–present
- Country: United States
- Allegiance: Texas Air National Guard
- Branch: United States Air Force
- Type: Combat Communications
- Role: Combat Support
- Size: 105 personnel
- Part of: 136th Airlift Wing
- Garrison/HQ: Hensley Field, Texas

The United States Air Force's 221st Combat Communications Squadron (221 CBCS) is a Texas Air National Guard combat communications unit located at Hensley Field, Texas. It is part of the larger 136th Airlift Wing.

== Mission ==
Deploy, operate, and sustain command, control, communications and computer systems (C4) and support capabilities for Air Force and joint military operations under bare-base conditions. Promote public safety for the citizens of the State of Texas and to respond to state and local emergencies.

== History ==
The 221st Combat Communications Squadron was originally organized as the 221st Radio Relay Squadron in July 1952. Its operational headquarters was the 251st Group at Springfield, Ohio, and the 136th Airlift Wing at Hensley Field supported it. Command of the unit was transferred to the 252d Group at Spokane, Washington in January 1963. In March 1968, the unit was re-designated the 221st Mobile Communications Squadron to more accurately reflect its mission. In June 1971 the 254th Mobile Communications Group was created at the 221st's station and became its operational headquarters.

== Assignments ==
=== Major Command/Gaining Command ===
- Air National Guard/Air Combat Command (2018–present)
- Air National Guard/Air Force Space Command (2008–2018)
- Air National Guard/Air Combat Command (1994–2008)
- Air National Guard/Tactical Air Command (1992–1994)
- Air National Guard/Air Force Communications Command (1952–1992)

== Previous designations ==
- 221st Mobile Communications Squadron (January 1963 – )
- 221st Radio Relay Squadron (July 1952 – January 1963)

== Bases stationed ==
- Hensley Field, Texas (2010–present)
- Garland, Texas (1952–2010)

== Equipment Operated ==
- (???-Present)
