= 136th =

136th may refer to:

- 136th (2/1st Devon and Cornwall) Brigade, formation of the Territorial Force of the British Army
- 136th (Durham) Battalion, CEF, unit in the Canadian Expeditionary Force during the First World War
- 136th Airlift Squadron flies the C-130 Hercules
- 136th Airlift Wing, airlift unit located at Naval Air Station Joint Reserve Base Fort Worth
- 136th Delaware General Assembly, meeting of the legislative branch of the Delaware state government
- 136th Georgia General Assembly succeeded the 135th and served as the precedent for the 137th General Assembly in 1983
- 136th Illinois Volunteer Infantry Regiment, infantry regiment that served in the Union Army during the American Civil War
- 136th Infantry Regiment (United States), infantry regiment in the Army National Guard
- 136th Kentucky Derby or 2010 Kentucky Derby
- 136th meridian east, line of longitude across the Arctic Ocean, Asia, the Pacific Ocean, Australasia, the Indian Ocean, the Southern Ocean and Antarctica
- 136th meridian west, line of longitude across the Arctic Ocean, North America, the Pacific Ocean, the Southern Ocean and Antarctica
- 136th Observation Squadron, unit of the Tennessee Air National Guard 118th Airlift Wing
- 136th Ohio Infantry (or 136th OVI) was an infantry regiment in the Union Army during the American Civil War
- 136th Rifle Division (disambiguation), name given to three different divisions in the Red Army during World War II
- 136th Street (IRT Third Avenue Line), station on the demolished IRT Third Avenue Line
- 136th Street (Manhattan), New York
- Pennsylvania's 136th Representative District or Pennsylvania House of Representatives, District 136

== See also ==
- 136 (number)
- AD 136, the year 136 (CXXXVI) of the Julian calendar
- 136 BC
