= 136th Division =

In military terms, 136th Division or 136th Infantry Division may refer to:

== Infantry divisions ==
- 136th Infantry Division (People's Republic of China)
- 136th Division (Imperial Japanese Army)
- 136th Rifle Division, Soviet Union

== Armoured divisions ==
- 136th Armored Legionary Division "Centauro", Kingdom of Italy, World War II
- 136th Armored Division "Giovani Fascisti", Kingdom of Italy, World War II

== See also ==
- List of military divisions by number
- 136th Brigade (disambiguation)
- 136th Regiment (disambiguation)
- 136th (disambiguation)
