= 136th Airlift Wing =

Unit of the Texas Air National Guard

136th Airlift Wing

- 136th Airlift Wing C-130J-30
- Active: 1950–1952; 1952–present
- Country: United States
- Allegiance: Texas
- Branch: Air National Guard
- Type: Wing
- Role: Airlift
- Part of: Texas Air National Guard
- Garrison/HQ: Naval Air Station Joint Reserve Base Fort Worth, Texas
- Nickname: Silver Eagles
- Motto: Nulli Secundus (Latin for 'Second to None')
- Engagements: Korean War; Operation Urgent Fury; United States invasion of Panama; Gulf War; Operation Noble Eagle; Operation Iraqi Freedom; Operation Enduring Freedom; Operation New Horizons
- Decorations: Air Force Outstanding Unit Award
- Website: 136aw.ang.af.mil

Commanders
- Commander: Colonel Kurt Anderson

Insignia
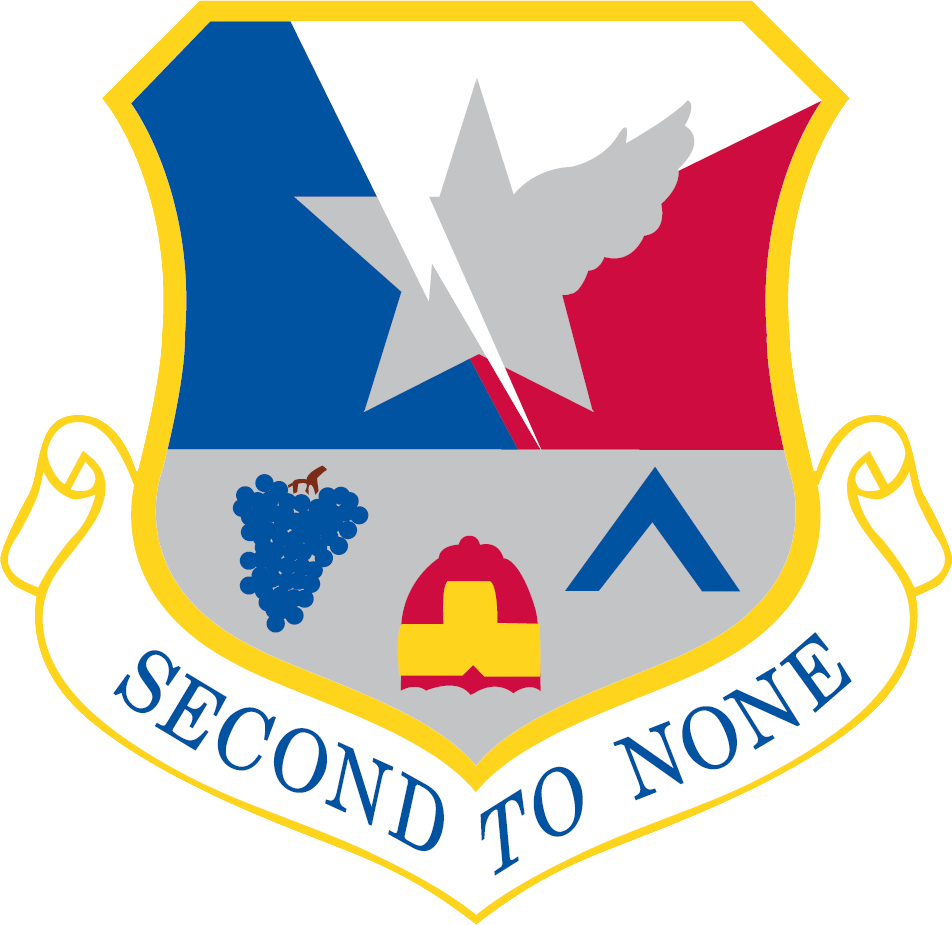
- 136th Airlift Wing emblem (Note: This change added a chevron to show elements of the wing served in Desert Storm.)

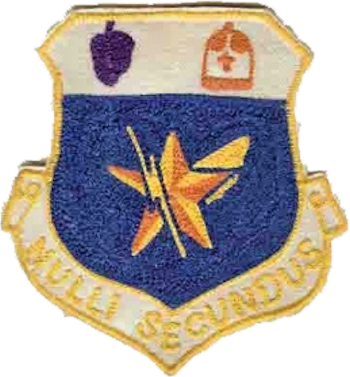
- 136th Fighter-Bomber Wing Emblem (Note: Approved 22 December 1953. This change added a cluster of grapes to show service in France during World War II by the wing's predecessor and a Korean Bell to show service in the Korean War.)

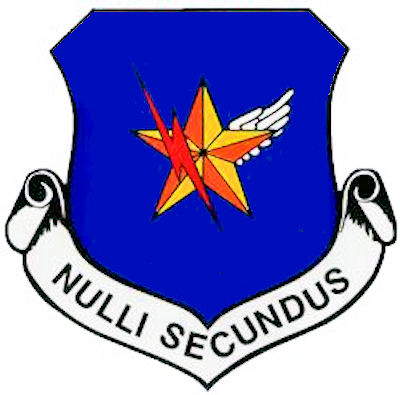
- First wing emblem
- Tail Stripe: Blue Stripe with "Texas" in white

The 136th Airlift Wing is a unit of the Texas Air National Guard, stationed at Naval Air Station Joint Reserve Base Fort Worth, Fort Worth, Texas. If activated to federal service, the wing is gained by the United States Air Force's Air Mobility Command (AMC).

== Mission ==
The wing's mission is to provide military forces for worldwide combat and peacetime tasking supporting Texas and the United States. The flying mission includes short field and dirt strip landing, and airdrop delivery of cargo and people in all weather, day and night.

== Units ==
The 136th Airlift Wing is composed of 5 groups, 19 units and 1 geographically separated unit (GSU).

- 136th Operations Group
  - 181st Airlift Squadron
  - 136th Operations Support Squadron
  - 136th Contingency Response Flight
- 136th Mission Support Group
  - 136th Civil Engineer Squadron
  - 136th Logistics Readiness Squadron
  - 136th Security Forces Squadron
  - 136th Mission Support/Contracting
  - 136th Force Support Squadron
  - 136th Communications Flight
- 136th Maintenance Group
  - 136th Maintenance Squadron
  - 136th Aircraft Generation Squadron
  - 136th Maintenance Operations Flight
- 136th Medical Group
- 254th Combat Communications Group
- 221st Combat Communications Squadron

== History ==
=== Korean War activation ===
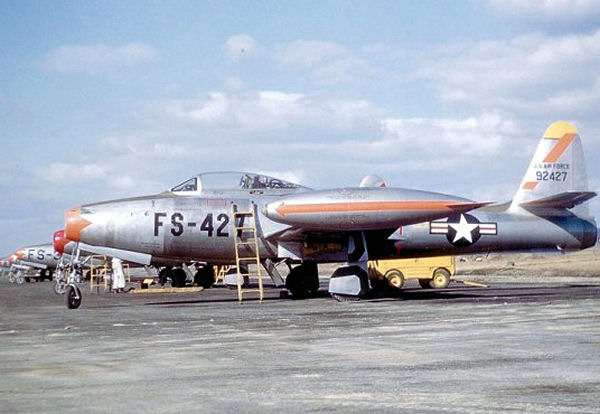
Republic F-84E-15-RE Thunderjet, AF Ser. No. 49-2427, of the 136th Fighter-Bomber Wing

As a result of the Korean War, the 136th Fighter Group of the Texas Air National Guard was mobilized on 10 October 1950 and moved to Langley Air Force Base, Virginia. upon arrival, it was redesignated the 136th Fighter-Bomber Group and assigned the 111th, 182nd and 154th Fighter-Bomber Squadrons. Because the National Guard had not yet implemented the Wing Base Organization of the regular Air Force, the group was temporarily assigned to a provisional wing. on 26 October, the 136th Fighter-Bomber Wing was activated to control the 136th Group along with organizations providing administrative, maintenance and medical support.

At Langley, the 136th trained with their F-51D Mustangs. Unfortunately losing two 111th FBS pilots in a training accident on 15 December. A third pilot was killed on 27 January 1951 in another accident. In February 1951, the aged F-51Ds that the unit had been flying since its activation in 1947 were replaced by F-84E Thunderjets, and the squadron began transition training on the jet fighter-bomber. Most of the training took place at Langley, although some pilots were sent to Shaw AFB, South Carolina. Maintenance crews, all new to jet aircraft, were trained at Langley and engine specialists were sent to the Allison plant in Indianapolis. Assigned to the Arkansas ANG's 154th FBS at the time was a U.S. Navy exchange pilot, future NASA astronaut LT Walter Schirra (who happened to be the only pilot assigned to the 136th at the time who was a qualified jet pilot).

In May 1951, less than seven months later, the Wing was deployed to Japan, being attached to Far East Air Force and stationed at Itazuke Air Force Base, the first echelon of the 136th arriving on 18 May. The 136th replaced the Strategic Air Command 27th Fighter-Escort Wing, which had deployed to Far East Air Force in the early days of the Korean War. At Itazuke, the squadrons took over the F-84Es of the 27th FEW, which remained in place, its aircraft being reassigned from SAC to Far East Air Force inventory records. On 2 June, the final elements of the 136th arrived in Japan, the National Guardsmen officially relieved the 27th FBW and the SAC airmen departed for the United States. The 136th was the first Air National Guard Wing in history to enter combat.

From Japan the Wing engaged in combat operations over South Korea, however flying in the North Pacific area was a challenge to the wing, losing seven F-84Es in non-combat operations and three in combat. On 26 June, in one of the largest air-to-air battles in Korea, two 182d FBS pilots, Captain Harry Underwood and 1st Lt Arthur Olighter shot down an enemy MiG-15 that broke through an F-86 Sabre escort of four B-29s. Two other 111th FBS pilots, 1st Lt John Morse and John Marlins scored probables in the same encounter. These were the first combat victories by Air National Guard pilots. On 3 July the 136th sent their aircraft to North Korea, attacking FLAK batteries in downtown Pyongyang while other aircraft attacked North Korean airfields.

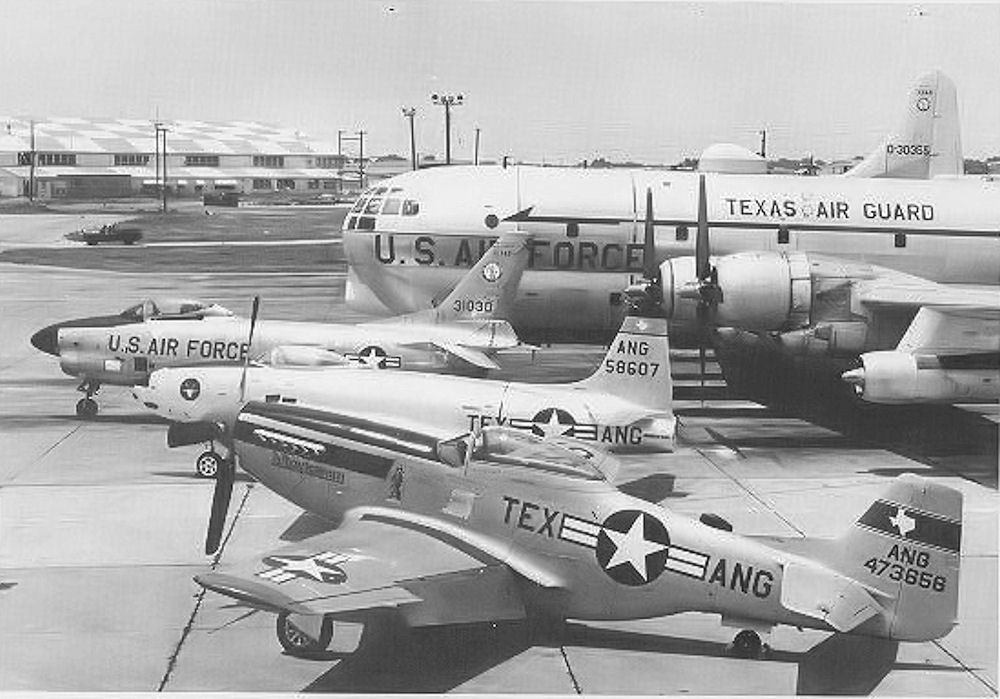
Airshow display (1964) of four Generations of 136th Airplanes. Shown, KC-97L Stratotanker; North American F-86D-60-NA Sabre, AF Ser. No. 53-1030 (F-86L) now on display at NAS JRB Fort Worth, TX; Lockheed F-80B-1-LO Shooting Star, AF Ser. No. 45-8607; North American F-51D-25-NA Mustang, AF Ser. No. 44-73856, sold to private owner

However, the short-legged F-84 had limited combat time over Korea, therefore on 16 November 1951 the Wing moved to Taegu Air Force Base (K-2) in South Korea for its combat operations. In 1952, the 136th was re-equipped with the F-84G Thunderjet, designed for tactical close air support of ground forces.

During its time in combat, the 136th flew 15,515 Combat Sorties; was credited with 4 enemy aircraft destroyed; 7 probables and 72 others damaged. It was the first ANG unit to down a MiG-15; it dropped 23,749 (7,120 tons) of bombs and expended over 3 million rounds of .50 caliber ammunition; being awarded Five Korean Campaign Ribbons. The 136th Fighter-Bomber Wing was released from active duty and returned to the United States on 10 July 1952

=== Air Defense Command ===
With the Wing's return from the Korean War, the 111th and the 182d Fighter-Bomber Squadrons joined the 181st FBS with VLR F-51H Mustangs. The 136th Fighter-Bomber Wing was assigned to the Central Air Defense Force, Air Defense Command (ADC) and resumed its postwar mission of Texas air defense.

It was not until 1955 that the Texas Air National Guard received jets from ADC, receiving F-80B and F-80C Shooting Stars and the squadrons being re-designated as Fighter-Interceptor Squadrons. The 111th received F-80C-11 (modified F-80A to F-80C standards) Shooting Stars on 1 July 1955, and on 1 July 1956 the 111th FIS commenced to participate in the active ADC runway alert program at Ellington AFB. The 182d at Brooks AFB received F-80C Shooting Stars in August 1956, replacing some of the last F-51H Mustangs in the USAF inventory. The 181st at Love Field received F-80Cs in January 1955.

On 1 July 1957 the 136th Fighter-Bomber Wing was re-designated an Air Defense Wing and reorganized along Air Defense Command lines. Combat units of the-Wing were selected by the Air Defense Command to man a runway alert program on full 24-hour basis – with armed jet fighters ready to "scramble" at a moment's notice. This event brought the wing into the daily combat operational program of the USAF, placing us on "the end of the runway" alongside regular USAF-Air Defense Fighter Squadrons. The obsolescent F-80-day fighters were upgraded to the all-weather/day/night F-86D Sabre Interceptor for all three squadrons by the end of the year.

Also in 1957, the Texas ANG was authorized to expand the 111th Fighter-Interceptor Squadron at Ellington to a group level, and the 147th Fighter-Interceptor Group was activated in Houston on 1 July. As a result, the 111th FIS was reassigned to the new 147th FIG. On 5 August 1957 the 147th was selected to organize and operate a Jet Instrument School to train Air National Guard pilots throughout the nation. On 1 March 1958 the wing was expanded to include the Louisiana ANG 159th Fighter Group (Air Defense) at New Orleans which placed the Texas Wing in command of all Tactical Air National Guard units in the States of Texas and Louisiana. In July 1960, ADC began upgrading the 111th, 122d and 182d FIS to the Mach-2 F-102A Delta Dagger interceptor.

==== Air Refueling ====
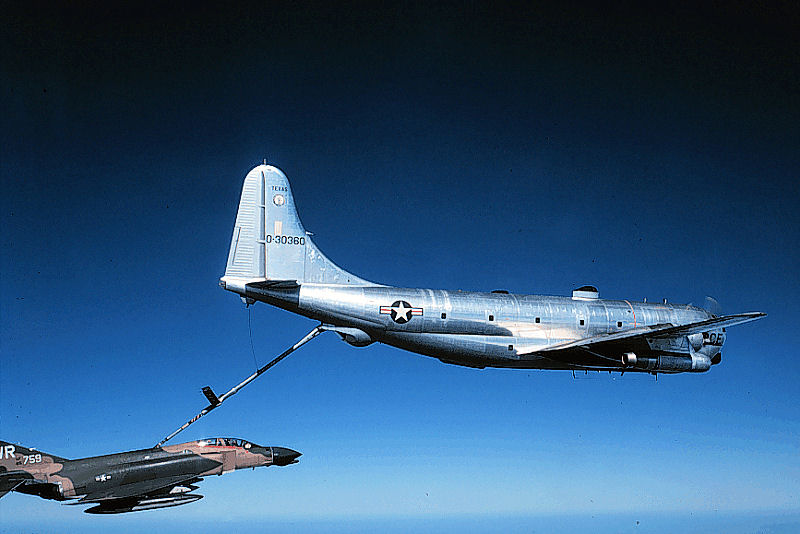
181st Air Refueling Squadron KC-97L Stratotanker. AF Ser. No. 53-0360, refueling an 81st Tactical Fighter Wing F-4E Phantom II circa 1975. This KC-97 is now in the collection of the Malmstrom Museum at Malmstrom AFB, displayed as AF Ser. No. 52-2638.

In August 1961, as part of an Air Defense Command re-organization, the Wing's assignment to the ADC Oklahoma City Air Defense Sector was terminated with the inactivation of the OCADS, and the 136th was transferred to Tactical Air Command. As part of the reorganization:

- The 136th Air Defense Group was inactivated.
- The Brooks AFB 182d Fighter-Interceptor Squadron was expanded to a group level forming the 149th Fighter-Interceptor Group under the ADC 31st Air Division.
- The Ellington AFB 147th Fighter-Interceptor Group and New Orleans 159th Fighter-Interceptor Group also remained with ADC, being reassigned to the 31st Air Division.

The 136th Air Defense Wing and its 181st Fighter-Interceptor Squadron were realigned to an air refueling mission, becoming the 136th Air Refueling Wing and 181st Air Refueling Squadron under the TAC Ninth Air Force. The 181st ARS was equipped with KC-97L Stratotankers, its mission becoming the air refueling of primarily Tactical Air Command fighter aircraft. Also, the 181st was moved from Dallas Love Field to Naval Air Station Dallas (Hensley Field), which ended a debate about the Texas Air National Guard operating from the expanding civilian airport.

With the transfer of the interceptors and no previously qualified aircrew or maintenance personnel assigned the 136th went through a year of transition to the new mission and to achieve operational status. They did so in eight months, the previous "normal" time for the conversion was two years. In 1966 the squadron began a rotational deployment to Ramstein Air Base in support of Operation Creek Party. which provided USAFE an air refueling capability. The Creek Party deployment rotations lasted until 1976, and over the decade the 136th saw millions of pounds of jet fuel off-loaded and millions of miles flown, all accident free. In July 1976 the KC-97s were retired and the 136th was transferred to Strategic Air Command, receiving jet KC-135A Stratotankers. Under SAC, the 181st Air Refueling Squadron mission included the air refueling of B-52 Stratofortress intercontinental bombers along with TAC and Aerospace Defense Command interceptors.

=== Tactical airlift ===
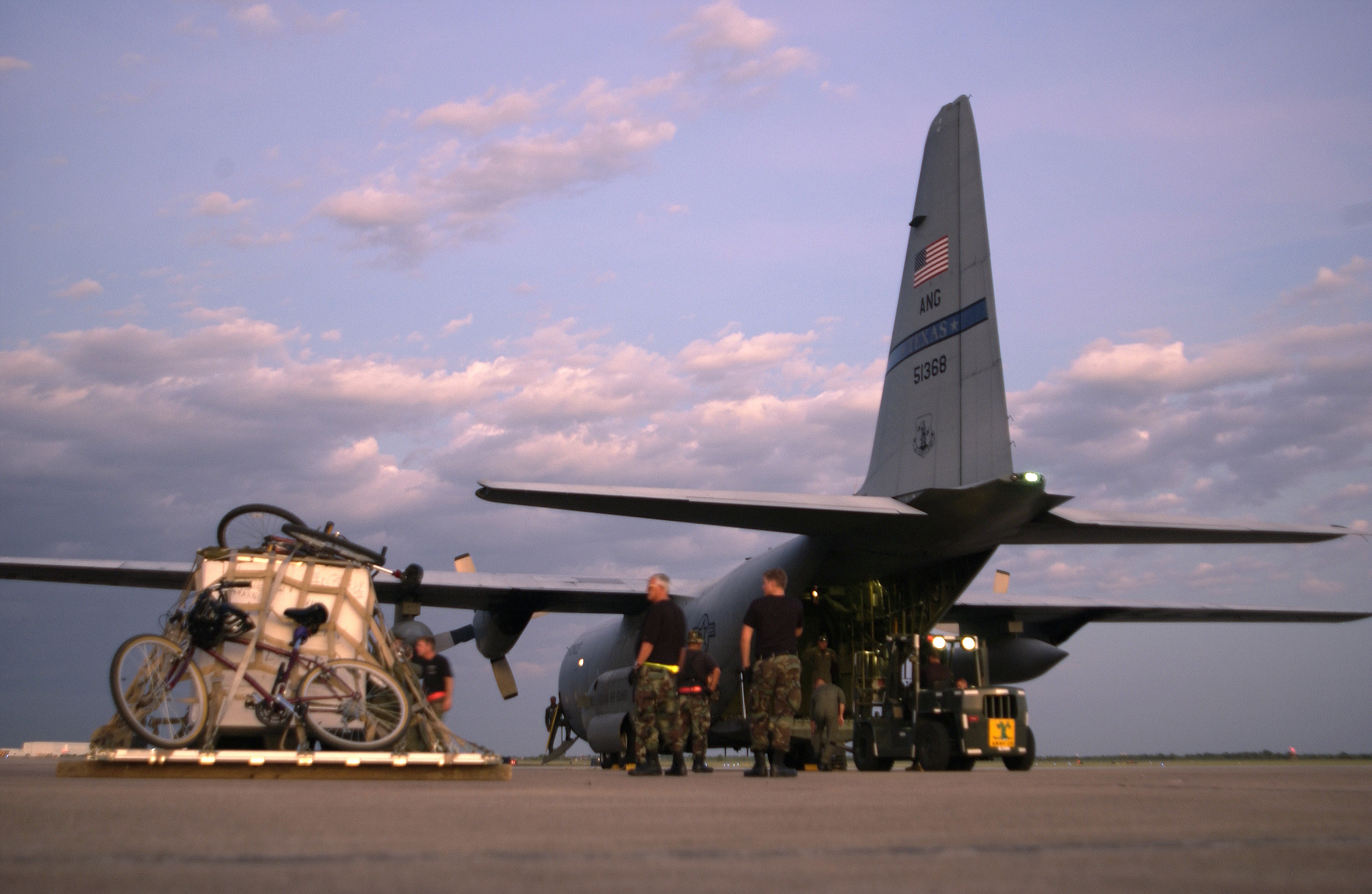
Air Force crews offload cargo as the remnants of Hurricane Rita drift away in 2005

On 1 April 1978, the 136th was reassigned from SAC to Military Airlift Command (MAC), and was realigned to a Tactical Airlift Wing, being re-equipped with C-130B Hercules transports. The new 136 TAW mission was airlift of troops, military equipment, cargo and aeromedical support.

The 136th TAW and its subordinate units participated in numerous Cold War military exercises such as Team Spirit, Volant Oak, Red Flag, and Reforger. Other Joint Chief of Staff exercises included "Ember Dawn IV" in Alaska and "Brave Shield" in Europe. In 1979, the Air National Guard and Air Force Reserve assumed full responsibility for airlift operations in Panama.

In mid-December 1989, and continuing for several weeks, wing aircraft, air crews, and support personnel on deployment for exercise Volant Oak at Howard AFB, Canal Zone, Panama, flew combat airlift missions for U. S. Southern Command during Operation Just Cause in Panama. More than 100 combat sorties were flown by 146th aircraft and crews, with no casualties or damage to aircraft.

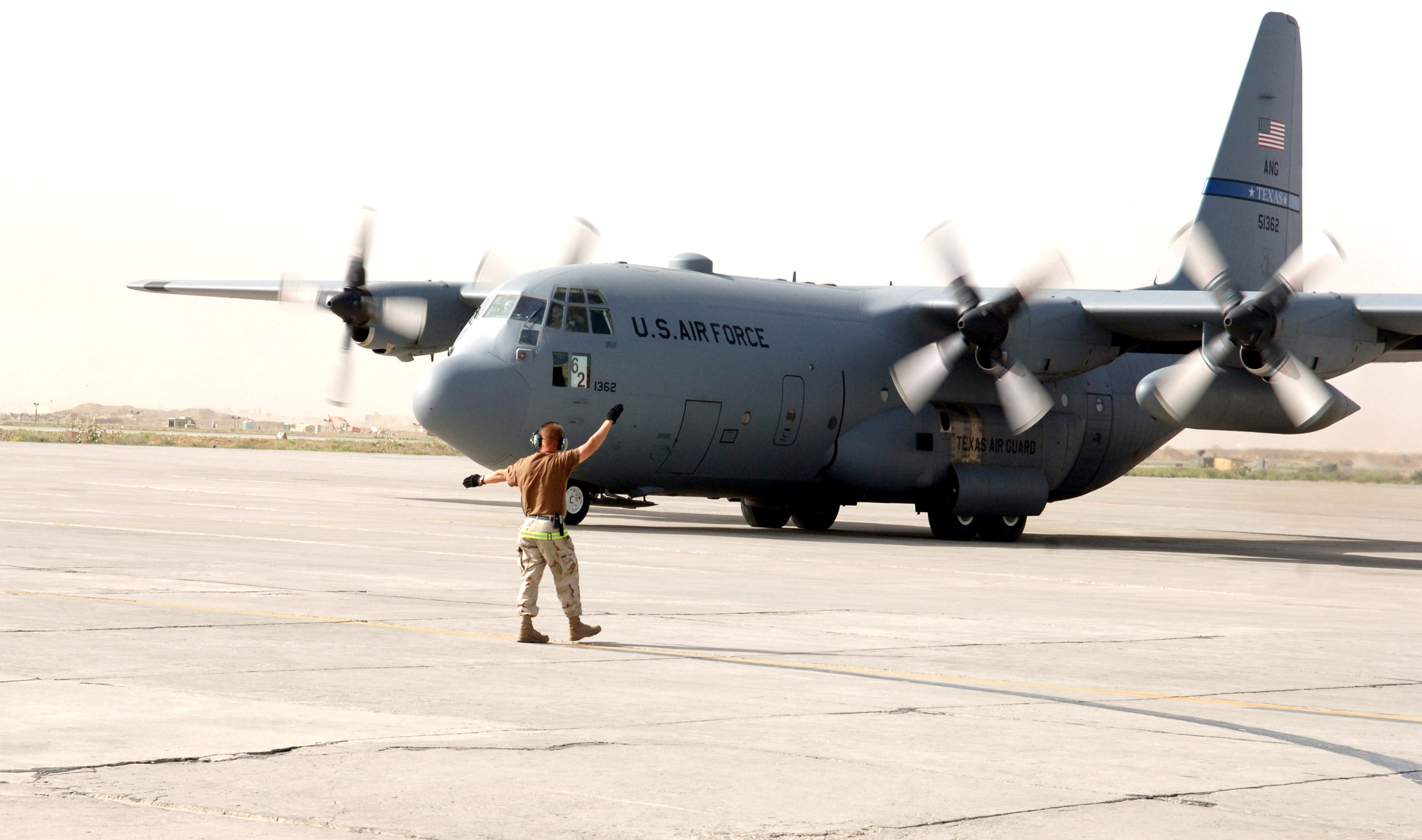
181st EAS C-130 at Bagram Air Force Base, Afghanistan

In August 1986 the Wing received the new C-130H aircraft. In August 1990, the world was moving swiftly toward armed confrontation in the Persian Gulf. By late January 1991, the 136th Airlift Wing had provided U. S. Central Command and U. S. Air Forces in Europe personnel, voluntarily and involuntarily activated, who participated in Operation Desert Shield and Operation Desert Storm. Aircraft and air crews from the 181st Airlift Squadron flew two-month-long tours of duty in Operation Volant Pine, a backfill of military airlifters to Europe by Air National Guard C-130s.

In 1997, wing members deployed supporting State and Federal missions. During the period the unit played critical roles in support of DoD missions deploying to Oman and Saudi Arabia in support of Southern Watch, and in peacetime humanitarian airlift, among the many missions accomplished by the wing during the award period.

On 1 October 1998, with the BRAC-directed closure of Naval Air Station Dallas / Hensley Field, the 136th Airlift Wing moved to the former Carswell Air Force Base, now re-designated as Naval Air Station Joint Reserve Base Fort Worth / Carswell Field pursuant to the same BRAC action that closed NAS Dallas. At this installation, the 136th was colocated with an existing Air Force Reserve Command fighter wing at Carswell and all the Naval Reserve and Marine Corps Reserve aviation units and Army Reserve aviation and ground units that had also relocated there.

As part of the Global War on Terrorism, the 136 AW has deployed numerous times totaling more than 6,000 Airmen since 11 September 2001 in support of Operation Noble Eagle, Operation Iraqi Freedom, Operation Enduring Freedom, Operation New Horizons, an average of six deployments per unit member.

In June 2021, the wing relinquished its last C-130H and received the first of eight C-130J -30 on 24 July 2021.

== Lineage ==
- Constituted as the 136th Fighter-Bomber Wing in October 1950

Activated on 26 October 1950
Inactivated and allotted to the Air National Guard on 10 July 1952
Redesignated 136th Fighter-Interceptor Wing on 10 July 1952 and activated
Redesignated 136th Fighter-Bomber Wing on 1 January 1953
Redesignated 136th Fighter-Interceptor Wing on 1 July 1955
Redesignated 136th Air Defense Wing on 1 July 1957
Redesignated 136th Air Refueling Wing on 1 October 1964
Redesignated 136th Tactical Airlift Wing on 8 April 1978
Redesignated 136th Airlift Wing on16 March 1992

=== Assignments ===
- Fourteenth Air Force, 25 October 1950
- Ninth Air Force, 26 October 1950
- Fifth Air Force, 14 May 1951 – 10 July 1952
- Texas Air National Guard, 10 Jul 1952 – present

Gained by: Central Air Defense Force, Air Defense Command
Gained by: Oklahoma City Air Defense Sector, Air Defense Command, 1 January 1960
Gained by: Tactical Air Command, 1 September 1961
Gained by: Eighth Air Force, Strategic Air Command, 1 July 1976
Gained by: Air Mobility Command, 1 June 1992
Gained by: Air Combat Command, 1 October 1993
Gained by: Air Mobility Command, 1 April 1997 – present

=== Operational Components ===
- 136th Fighter-Bomber Group (later 136th Fighter-Interceptor Group, 136th Fighter-Bomber Group, 136th Fighter-Interceptor Group, 136th Fighter Group (Air Defense), 136th Air Refueling Group, 136th Operations Group), 26 October 1950 – 10 July 1952, 10 July 1952 – 9 December 1974, 16 March 1992 – present
- 147th Fighter Group (Air Defense), 17 May 1958 – 30 August 1961
- 159th Fighter Group (Air Defense), 1 March 1958 – 30 August 1961 (GSU New Orleans, LA)
- 181st Air Refueling Squadron (later 181st Tactical Airlift Squadron, 181st Airlift Squadron), 9 December 1974 – 16 March 1992

=== Stations ===
- Langley Air Force Base, Virginia, 24 October 1950 – 13 May 1951
- Itazuke Air Base, Japan, 15 May 1951
- Taegu Air Base (K-2), South Korea, 16 November 1951 – 10 July 1952
- Love Field Airport, Dallas, Texas, 10 July 1952
- Naval Air Station Dallas, Texas, 1 September 1961
- Naval Air Station Joint Reserve Base Fort Worth, Texas, 1 October 1998 – Present

=== Aircraft ===
- F-51D Mustang, 1950–1951
- F-84B Thunderjet, 1950–1951
- F-51H Mustang, 1951–1956
- F-84E Thunderjet, 1951–1952
- F-84G Thunderjet, 1952
- F-80 Shooting Star, 1955–1957

- F-86D Sabre Interceptor, 1957–1960
- F-102A Delta Dagger, 1960–1961
- KC-97L Stratotanker, 1961–1976
- KC-135A Stratotanker, 1976–1978
- C-130B Hercules, 1978–1986
- C-130H Hercules, 1986–2021
- C-130J Hercules, 2021-

=== Decorations ===
- Air Force Outstanding Unit Award
