= Naval Air Station Joint Reserve Base Fort Worth =

Military airbase near Fort Worth, TX, US

- Carswell Field
- Fort Worth, Texas in the United States
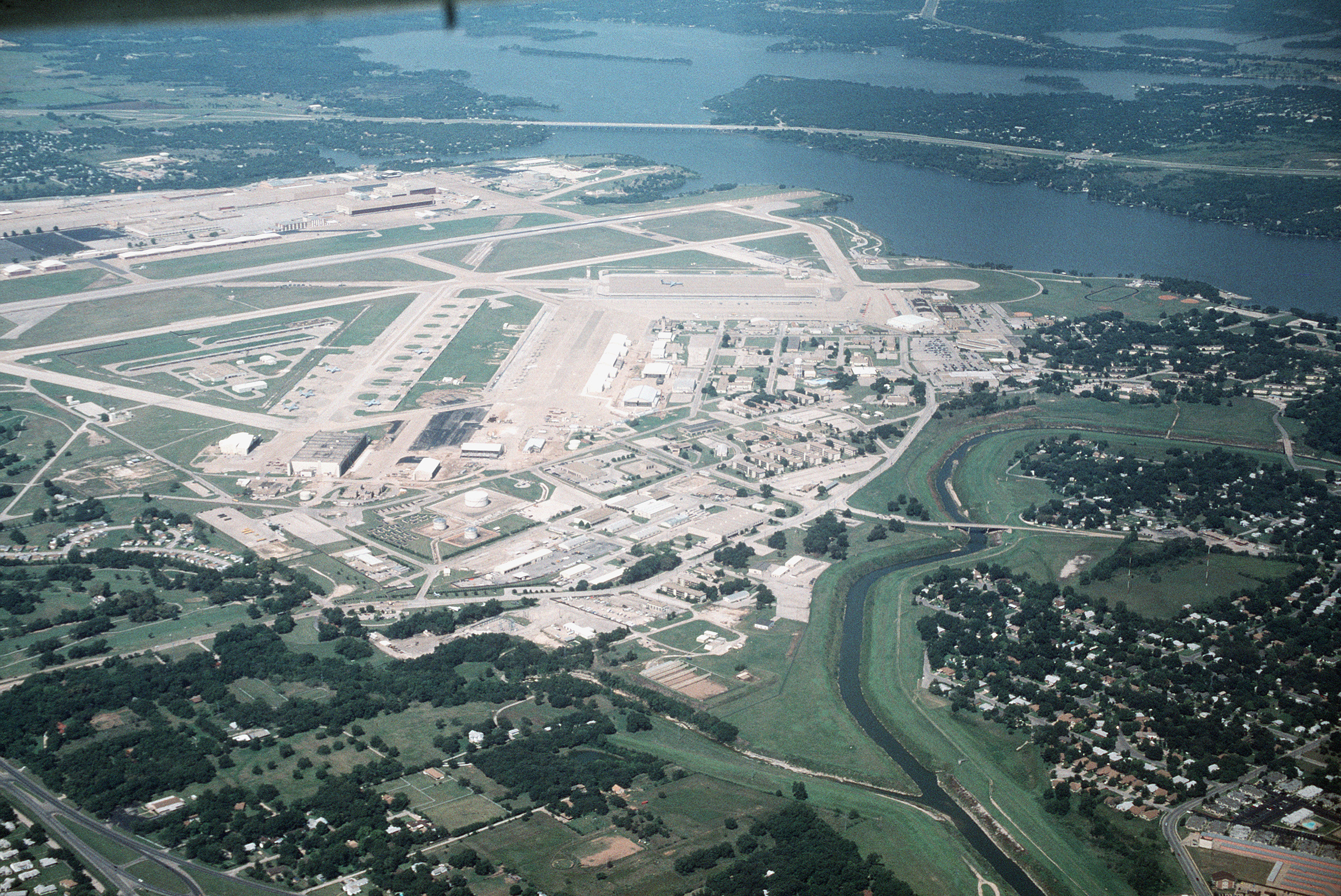
- Aerial view of Naval Air Station Joint Reserve Base Fort Worth

Site information
- Type: Naval Air Station Joint Reserve Base
- Owner: Department of Defense
- Operator: US Navy
- Controlled by: Navy Region Southeast
- Condition: Operational
- Website: Official website

Location
- Location within Texas Location within the United States
- Coordinates: 32°46′09″N 097°26′30″W

Site history
- Built: 1942 (as Tarrant Field)
- In use: 1942–1944 (US Army Air Forces); 1948–1994 (US Air Force); 1994 – present (US Navy)

Garrison information
- Current commander: Captain Beau Hufstetler

Airfield information
- Identifiers: IATA: FWH, ICAO: KNFW, FAA LID: NFW, WMO: 722595
- Elevation: 198 metres (650 ft) AMSL
Runways
Direction	Length and surface
18/36	3,657 metres (11,998 ft) Concrete
177/357 (Assault strip)	1,218.5 metres (3,998 ft) Concrete

Naval Air Station Joint Reserve Base Fort Worth (abbreviated NAS JRB Fort Worth) (IATA: FWH, ICAO: KNFW, FAA LID: NFW) includes Carswell Field, a military airbase located 5 nautical miles (9 km; 6 mi) west of the central business district of Fort Worth, in Tarrant County, Texas, United States. This military airfield is operated by the United States Navy Reserve. It is located in the cities of Fort Worth, Westworth Village, and White Settlement in the western part of the Fort Worth urban area.

NAS Fort Worth JRB is the successor to the former Naval Air Station Dallas and incorporates other Reserve commands and activities, primarily those of the Air Force Reserve, that were present on site when the installation was known as Carswell Air Force Base, a former Strategic Air Command (SAC) facility later transferred to the Air Combat Command (ACC).

Several United States Navy headquarters and operational units are based at NAS Fort Worth JRB, including Naval Air Reserve air wings and aviation squadrons, intelligence commands and Seabees.

The Air Force Reserve Command's Tenth Air Force (10 AF) headquarters and the 301st Fighter Wing and its flying squadron the 457th Fighter Squadron continue to be based at the installation. The Wing is currently (2024) converting to the F-35 Lightning II after operating the F-16 for 32 years. The 136th Airlift Wing of the Texas Air National Guard and its flying component, the 181st Airlift Squadron, fly new stretch versions of the C-130J airlifter. MAG-41, a Marine Aircraft Group, with VMFA-112 (F-18C), VMGR-234 (KC-130J), VMR-1 (C-40A), and various ground units are also located at NAS Fort Worth JRB. VR-59 flies the C-40A personnel and cargo transport.

Aircraft types initially based at NAS Fort Worth JRB were the F-14 Tomcat, F/A-18 Hornet, C-9B Skytrain II, C-130 Hercules and KC-130 Hercules that relocated from the former NAS Dallas, joining extant F-16 Fighting Falcon aircraft that were previously located at the installation while it was known as Carswell Air Force Base and later as Carswell Air Reserve Station.

Currently based aircraft are Navy C-40 Clipper transports of the Naval Air Reserve, Air Force F-16 Fighting Falcon fighters of the Air Force Reserve Command, C-130 Hercules airlift aircraft of the Texas Air National Guard, Marine Corps F/A-18 Hornet strike fighters and KC-130 Hercules aerial refueling and transport aircraft of the Marine Corps Reserve. The U.S. Army Reserve also has D Co, 6/52AVN flying UC-35 and C-12 aircraft on VIP transportation duties.

== Origins ==
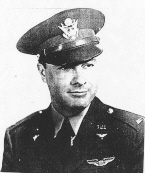
Major Horace S. Carswell, Jr. (1916–1944)

Carswell Air Force Base was named after Medal of Honor recipient Major Horace S. Carswell, Jr., USAAF (1916–1944). Major Carswell was returning from an attack on Japanese shipping in the South China Sea on 26 October 1944 when he attempted to save a crewmember whose parachute had been destroyed by flak. He remained at the controls of his crippled bomber and died while crash-landing the B-24 Liberator near Tungchen, China. The base was renamed in his honor on 29 January 1948.

Carswell's origins date back to the early years of aviation. After the United States' entry into World War I in April 1917, General John J. "Blackjack" Pershing invited the British Royal Flying Corps (RFC) to establish training fields in the southern United States where the warmer weather would be more conducive for flying year-round. In June, the War Department inspected 6 sites around Fort Worth, Texas which had been offered by the Chamber of Commerce. In August the War Department signed leases with the RFC on 3 sites around Fort Worth. Known as the Flying Triangle, these sites were Hicks Field (#1), Barron Field (#2), and Benbrook (later Carruthers) Field (#3) based on their locations. In April 1918 these airfield were turned over to the Air Service, United States Army as training fields for American pilots. Hundreds of pilots learned their basic and primary flying skills at these airfields in the Fort Worth area during the war. They were closed in 1919 when the war ended.

In 1940 the City of Fort Worth had filed an application with the Civil Aeronautics Administration (CAA), asking for a primary pilot training airfield for the Army Air Corps. In May, General Jacob E. Fickel visited Fort Worth on an inspection visit. Fickel had learned to fly at Carruthers Field in 1918. At the same time, the Fort Worth Chamber of Commerce was trying to convince aircraft manufacturers to build an aircraft assembly plant in the area. Consolidated Aircraft, wanting to build in the area, suggested to the Air Corps that they jointly build an airfield adjacent to the heavy bomber plant they wanted to build in Fort Worth. On 16 June 1941, President Franklin D. Roosevelt approved $1.75 million to construct an airfield next to the Consolidated manufacturing plant. The Army wanted to have the airfield ready quickly before the plant was put into production and construction of the Lake Worth Bomber Plant Airport began almost immediately.

=== World War II ===
The Army changed its plans after the attack on Pearl Harbor; instead of being an operational base, Tarrant Field, as the facility was called, became a heavy-bomber training school. The first unit assigned to the base was the Army Air Forces Training Command Combat Crew School on 1 July 1942. At the same time, the Consolidated plant began assembly of B-24D Liberator aircraft in May, with the first aircraft being assigned to the school in August. On 29 July, the base was again renamed, this time as Fort Worth Army Air Field.

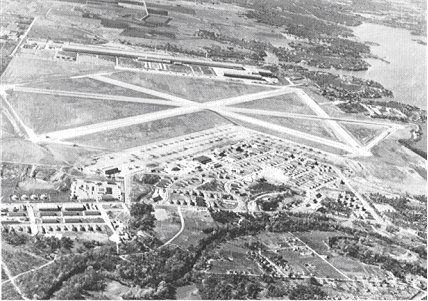
Oblique airphoto of Fort Worth Army Air Field in 1945, looking east to west. The airfield technical area is on the east side of the main north–south runway, with the Consolidated-Vultee aircraft manufacturing facilities (later Convair) on the west side.

The Army Air Forces Combat Crew School (later redesignated Army Air Forces Pilot School, Specialized 4-Engine) took graduates of Training Command's advanced-pilot training schools and experienced 2-engine pilots, and, trained them on flying the B-24 Liberator. The school was officially opened on 12 October 1942 and was under the jurisdiction of the 34th Flying Training Wing at San Angelo Army Air Field, Texas. The school was initially equipped with B-24Ds that were assembled across the runway at Consolidated; later it was upgraded to B-24Es that were manufactured at Consolidated's Willow Run Plant in Michigan, then flown to the Fort Worth plant for final modifications.

During training, nine-member crews were assigned to each plane, and the crews ate, slept and trained together 24-hours a day. This allowed the crew to learn both the technical skills needed for aircraft operation as well as the other crew members' minds and reactions. Each day they trained five hours in the air and five hours on the ground. Each class lasted four and one-half weeks. Training officials added a Bomb Approach School in October 1943, which incorporated teamwork between a pilot and bombardier. In addition, the 9000th WAC Company of the Women's Army Corps was used in the control tower as well as in the communications office of the base.

Fort Worth Army Air Field 1943 Yearbook

In late 1944, the B-24 training was phased out at Fort Worth AAF, being replaced with a B-32 Dominator Flight Crew Conversion Training School. Training Command instructor pilots were flown to the Consolidated manufacturing plant in San Diego to learn about the Dominator, which was planned as a stablemate of the B-29 Superfortress; much like the B-17 Flying Fortress was teamed with the B-24 Liberator. The first B-32 arrived at Fort Worth in September 1944, however it was in the modification plant until January before it was released to the training school. By the end of 1944, only five production aircraft had been delivered by Consolidated; by comparison the B-29 had been flown in combat for nearly six months. The Army was quite unhappy about the Dominator and the production problems it was experiencing.

Eventually 40 TB-32 trainers were produced for the training program to get underway. Prospective B-32 pilots underwent 50 hours training in the TB-32s, and co-pilots received 25 hours of flight time and 25 hours of observer training. Ultimately, a shortage of equipment meant the B-32 training at Fort Worth was never fully realized, and, after V-J Day, officials eliminated the B-32 training program.

== Strategic Air Command ==
In November 1945, jurisdiction of Fort Worth AAF was transferred to Second Air Force, which established its 17th Bombardment Operational Training Wing at the base, equipped with B-29A Superfortresses. The Air Force had decided to keep Fort Worth as a permanent airfield, and, in 1946, constructed an 8,200 ft north–south extra heavy-duty runway for future use.

The number of completed B-32s at the Consolidated plant had reached 74 production aircraft, along with the TB-32 trainers, many of which were parked at the field. These were ordered flown from Fort Worth directly to storage at Davis-Monthan Air Force Base and Kingman Fields, Arizona for disposal, and, the partially assembled B-32 aircraft in the plant were ordered scrapped in place.

Fort Worth Army Air Field was assigned to the newly formed Strategic Air Command in March 1946, and on 1 October 1946, the 7th Bombardment Group, Very Heavy was activated. With its activation, the 7th became part of the Fifteenth Air Force (15 AF), headquartered at Colorado Springs, Colorado. Personnel and aircraft of the new group, consisting of the Boeing B-29 Superfortress, were transferred to Fort Worth AAF from the 92nd Bombardment Group at Spokane AAF, Washington. On 1 November 1946, the Eighth Air Force moved its headquarters to Fort Worth AAF from MacDill Field, Florida.

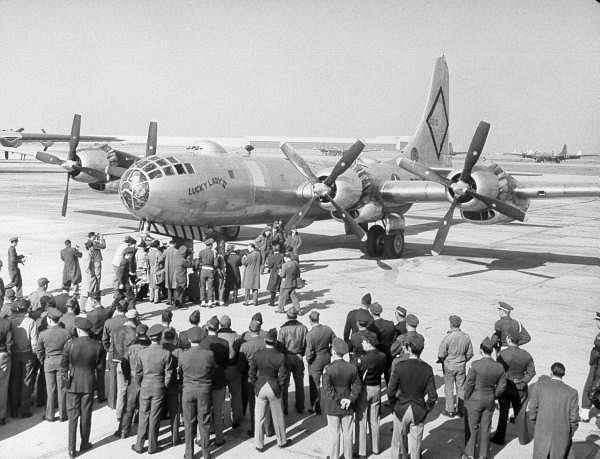
B-50 Superfortress, Lucky Lady II, preparing to take off from Carswell AFB, Texas for the first nonstop circumnavigation of the world, 1949

With its B-29s, the group prepared its people for any combat eventuality that might arise, flying simulated bombing missions over various cities.

On 5 July 1947, a flight of eight B-29s of the 492nd Bomb Squadron deployed from Fort Worth AAF to Yokota AB, Japan. Shortly after this the detachment received orders to redeploy to Fort Worth AAF via Washington, D.C. The aircraft left Yokota AB on 2 August, flew over the Aleutian Islands, then into Anchorage, Alaska. From Anchorage the flight flew over Edmonton, Alberta, Canada, turned south and flew over Minnesota and Wisconsin. The bombers flew a low-level flight between The Pentagon and Washington Monument in the Capital on 3 August. Completing this aerial demonstration, they headed for Fort Worth, landing 31 hours after launch from Japan and covering 7,086 miles.

On 12 September, the group deployed 30 B-29s to Giebelstadt Army Airfield, near Würzburg, West Germany. This flight was the largest bomber formation flown from Fort Worth AAF overseas to date, landing in Germany on 13 September. During their ten-day stay, the group bombers participated in training operations over Europe, as well as a show-of-force display by the United States in the early part of the Cold War with the Soviet Union. The flight redeployed from Germany on 23 September.

=== Cold War ===
In 1947, shortly after the United States Air Force was established as a separate branch of the United States military, the Hobson Wing-Base Organization Plan was implemented. The 7th was selected as one of the "Test Wings" to evaluate the new organization, and, on 17 November 1947 the 7th Bombardment Wing was established. The test was successful and the wing was made permanent on 1 August 1948. As part of the new organization both the 7th and 11th Bombardment Groups became its operational components.

Upon becoming its own service, the USAF renamed many former Army Air Fields as memorials to deceased airmen. On 1 January 1948, Fort Worth Airfield was renamed Griffiss Air Force Base as a memorial to Lt. Col. Townsend Griffiss (1900–1942), a Buffalo native and 1922 West Point graduate who, in 1942, became the first U.S. airman to be killed in the line of duty in the European Theatre of World War II when his Consolidated B-24 Liberator was shot down by friendly fire over the English Channel. On 27 February, the base's name was changed again to memorialize native son and Medal of Honor winner, Major Horace S. Carswell, Jr., who gave his life while attempting to crash land his crippled B-24 over China. The Rome Air Depot, near Rome, NY, was then rename for Griffiss.

On 1 December 1948, the 11th Bombardment Group was reactivated by the Strategic Air Command (SAC) at Carswell and was equipped with B-36s. 7th Bomb Group personnel began training the new 11th Bomb Group people in the new aircraft and the 11th soon began receiving them.

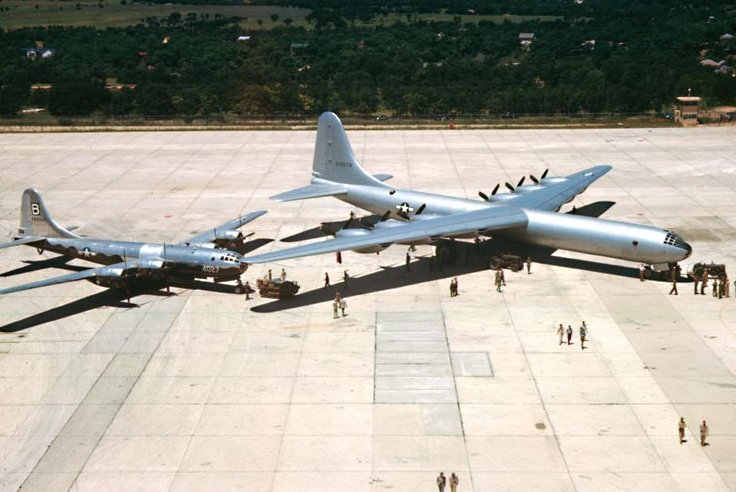
Arrival of the first B-36A at Carswell AFB, "City of Fort Worth" (AF Serial No. 44-92015), in June 1948

Since 1942, the XB-36 Peacemaker long range bomber had been under development by Consolidated, and work on it was shifted from Consolidated's San Diego, California plant to its government-leased plant in Fort Worth. By 1947 the initial production version B-36A was ready, and, in June 1948 the first Convair B-36A Peacemaker was delivered to the Air Force. The first B-36A was designated the "City of Fort Worth" (AF Serial No. 44-92015) and was assigned to the 492d Bomb Squadron. B-36s continued to roll out from the production plant throughout 1948 while being assigned to the 7th Bomb Group. The group's last B-29 was transferred out on 6 December to the 97th Bombardment Group at Biggs Air Force Base in El Paso, Texas. For 10 years, Carswell's "Peacemaker" fleet cast a large shadow on the Soviet Iron Curtain and served as the United States' major deterrent weapons system.

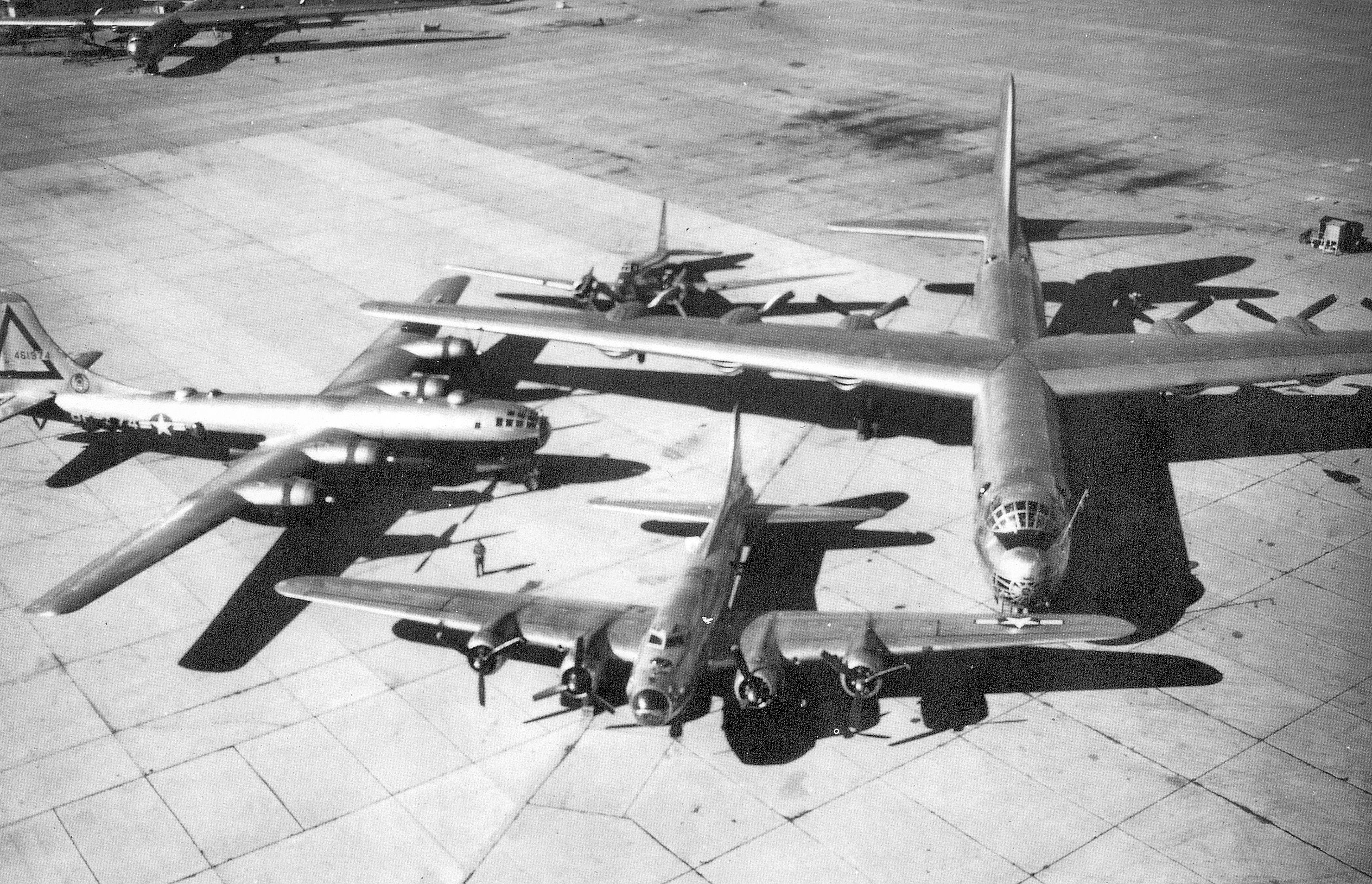
Special photo of Air Force bombers from the 1930s through the late 1940s. A Douglas B-18 "Bolo"; a Boeing B-17 "Flying Fortress"; a Boeing "B-29 Superfortress" and the B-36 "Peacemaker" dominating the group photo with a 230-foot wingspan. Taken at Carswell AFB after receipt of the first B-36 in 1948. Note the SAC 7th Bombardment Wing marking on the B-29.

In February 1949, a Boeing B-50 Superfortress (developed from the famed B-29) and named Lucky Lady II took off from Carswell for the first nonstop flight around the world. She returned to Carswell after mid-air refuelings, flying 23,108 miles, and remaining aloft for ninety-four hours and one minute.

In January 1951, the 7th Bombardment Group took part in a special training mission to the United Kingdom. The purpose of the mission was to evaluate the updated B-36D under simulated war-plan conditions and further evaluate the equivalent airspeed and compression tactics for heavy bombardment aircraft. The aircraft, staging through Limestone AFB, Maine, would land at RAF Lakenheath, United Kingdom, following a night radar-bombing attack on Heligoland, West Germany. From there the bombers would conduct a simulated bomb run on the Heston Bomb Plot, London, finally landing at RAF Lakenheath. This was the first deployment of wing and SAC B-36 aircraft to England and Europe. For the next four days the flight flew sorties out of England. The aircraft redeployed to the United States on 20 January arriving at Carswell on 21 January.

On 16 February 1951, the '11th Bombardment Wing was activated, and, the 11th Bombardment Group was assigned to it. The 19th Air Division was organized the same day at Carswell. With this move, the division assumed responsibility over both the 7th and 11th Wings at Carswell. On the same date, the 7th Group became a "paper organization," with all other flying squadrons reassigned directly to the 7th Bombardment Wing as part of the Tri-Deputate organization plan adopted by the wing. The 7th Bomb Group was inactivated on 16 June 1952.

==== 7th Bombardment Wing ====
The 7th Bombardment Group was activated at Fort Worth Army Air Field on October 1, 1946, and transferred into SAC as part of 2nd Air Force. On November 3, 1947, the Air Force abandoned the old Group organization of World War II and introduced the Wing Organization. This resulted in all bomb groups being redesignated as wings. Thus the 7th Bomb Group became the 7th Bomb Wing, Very Heavy. The "very heavy," indicating it flew B-29s and B-50s. During this time, its home was renamed Carswell Air Force Base. The unit was equipped with B-29s and was responsible for global bombardment training.

==== B-36 Peacemaker Era ====
The wing's mission was to prepare for global strategic bombardment in the event of hostilities. Under various designations, the 7th Bombardment Wing flew a wide variety of aircraft at the base until its inactivation in 1993.

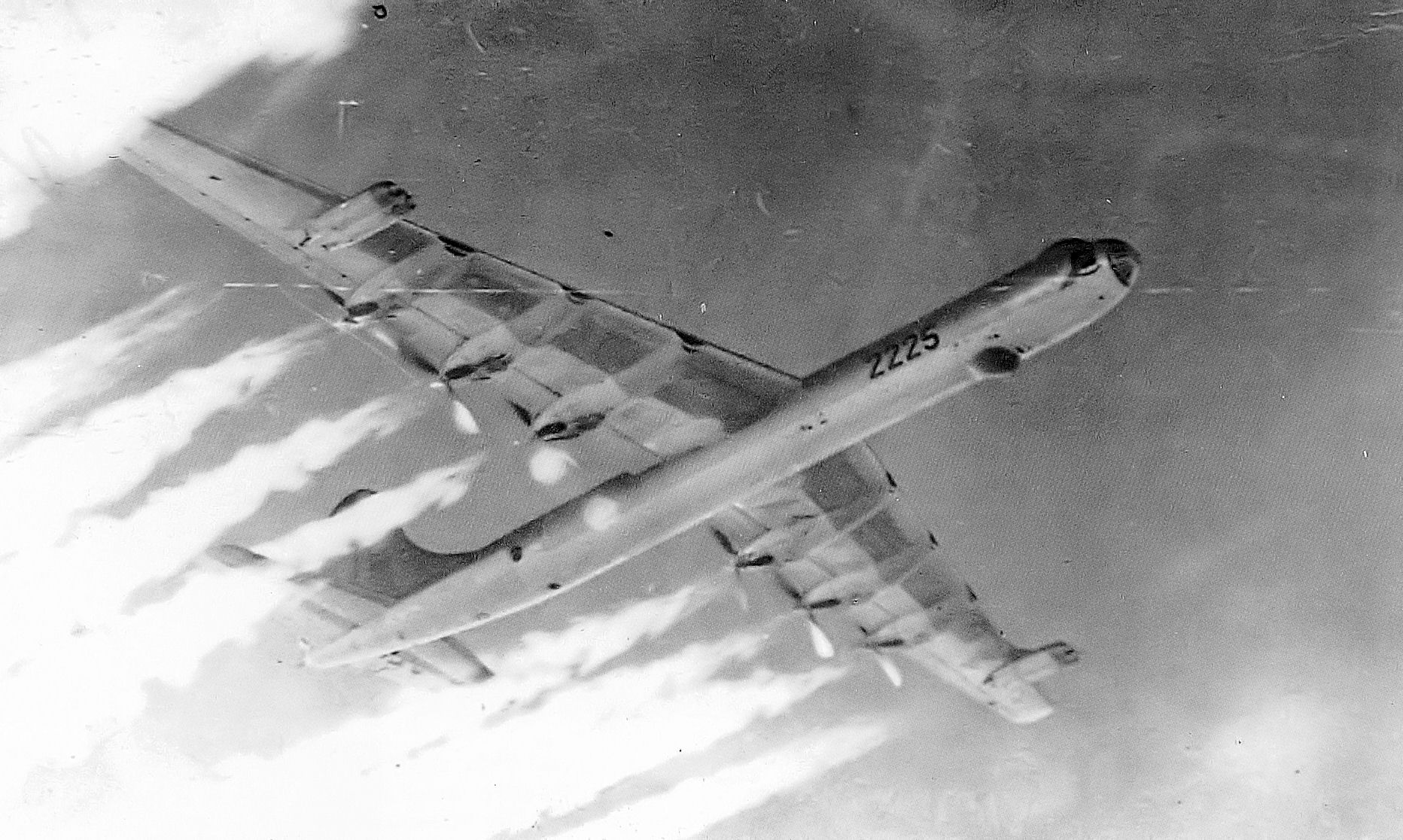
Convair B-36J-5-CF Peacemaker, AF Ser. No. 52-2225, of the 11th Bomb Wing showing "Six turnin', four burnin", c. 1955

A five-ship B-36 formation was flown on 15 January 1949, in an air review over Washington, D.C., commemorating the inauguration of the President of the United States, Harry S. Truman. By September 1952, the B-36s assigned to the 7th and 11th Wings comprised two thirds of SAC's intercontinental bomber force.

On 1 September 1952, what was then thought to be a tornado rolled across the Carswell flight line, with winds over 90 miles per hour recorded at the control tower. By the time it had passed "the flight line was a tangle of airplanes, equipment and pieces of buildings." None of the 82 bombers on the base escaped damage, and SAC declared the entire 19th Air Division non-operational. Maintenance personnel of the 7th and 11th Wings went on an 84-hour weekly work schedule and began work to restore the least damaged aircraft to operational status. More heavily damaged aircraft were worked on by personnel from the San Antonio Air Materiel Area, where the depot for the B-36 was located. The planes that had been most heavily damaged were towed across the field to the Convair plant where they had been manufactured. Within a month, 51 of the base's Peacemakers had been returned to service and the division was again declared operational. By May 1953, all but two of the planes had been returned to service. (Note: One plane was written off, another was bailed to Convair to be used for experiments with nuclear power. McGowan, p. 65.)

In 1954, Carswell was prominently featured and used as a filming location in the James Stewart and June Allyson film Strategic Air Command. 11th Bomb Group B-36s appeared with James Stewart who was also attached to the unit in the 1950s as a unit commander in his then-rank of Colonel in the Air Force Reserve.

On 13 June 1955, the Strategic Air Command realigned its three numbered air forces resulting in Headquarters, 8 AF moving from Carswell to Westover AFB, Massachusetts. With that move, Carswell was reassigned under Second Air Force (2 AF), headquartered at Barksdale AFB, Louisiana.

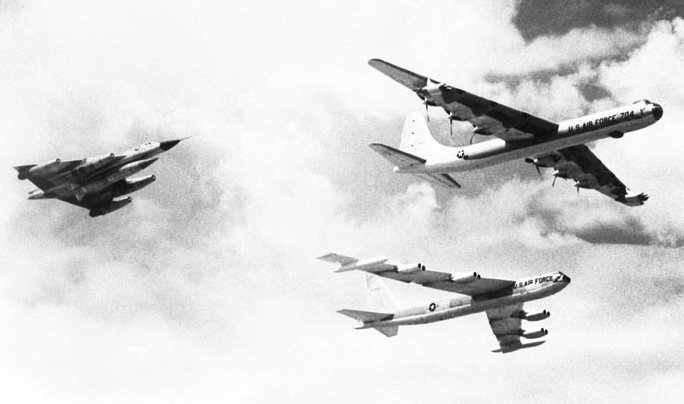
Last B-36 flight from Carswell, 30 May 1958, flying in formation with a Convair YB-58 and Boeing B-52.

On 16 February 1951, the 11th Bombardment Wing was activated and the 11th Bombardment Group was assigned to it, although all group resources were transferred to the wing until the group was inactivated in June 1952. The wing deployed to Nouasseur Air Base, French Morocco from 4 May until 2 July 1955. The wing won the SAC Bombing Competition and the Fairchild Trophy in 1954, 1956 and 1960.

The phrase "7–11" must have been considered a lucky combination, because the two wings continued to share Carswell Air Force Base until 13 December 1957, when the 11th moved to Altus Air Force Base, Oklahoma and began receiving Boeing B-52 Stratofortresses.

During January 1958, the wing began transferring its B-36 bombers to various SAC wings. On 20 January, the wing transferred all B-52 equipment and property on hand to the 4123rd Strategic Wing in order to facilitate that organization's conversion, which was scheduled several months ahead of the 7th Bomb Wing at Carswell.

On 30 May, Memorial Day, the last of the B-36s in the wing was retired with appropriate ceremonies and an "Open House." Air Force and civilian personnel of the base, and civilians from surrounding communities, were on hand to bid the "Peacemaker" a fond farewell. This last flight of a B-36 phased-out completely the B-36 program for the wing.

==== B-52 Stratofortress Era ====
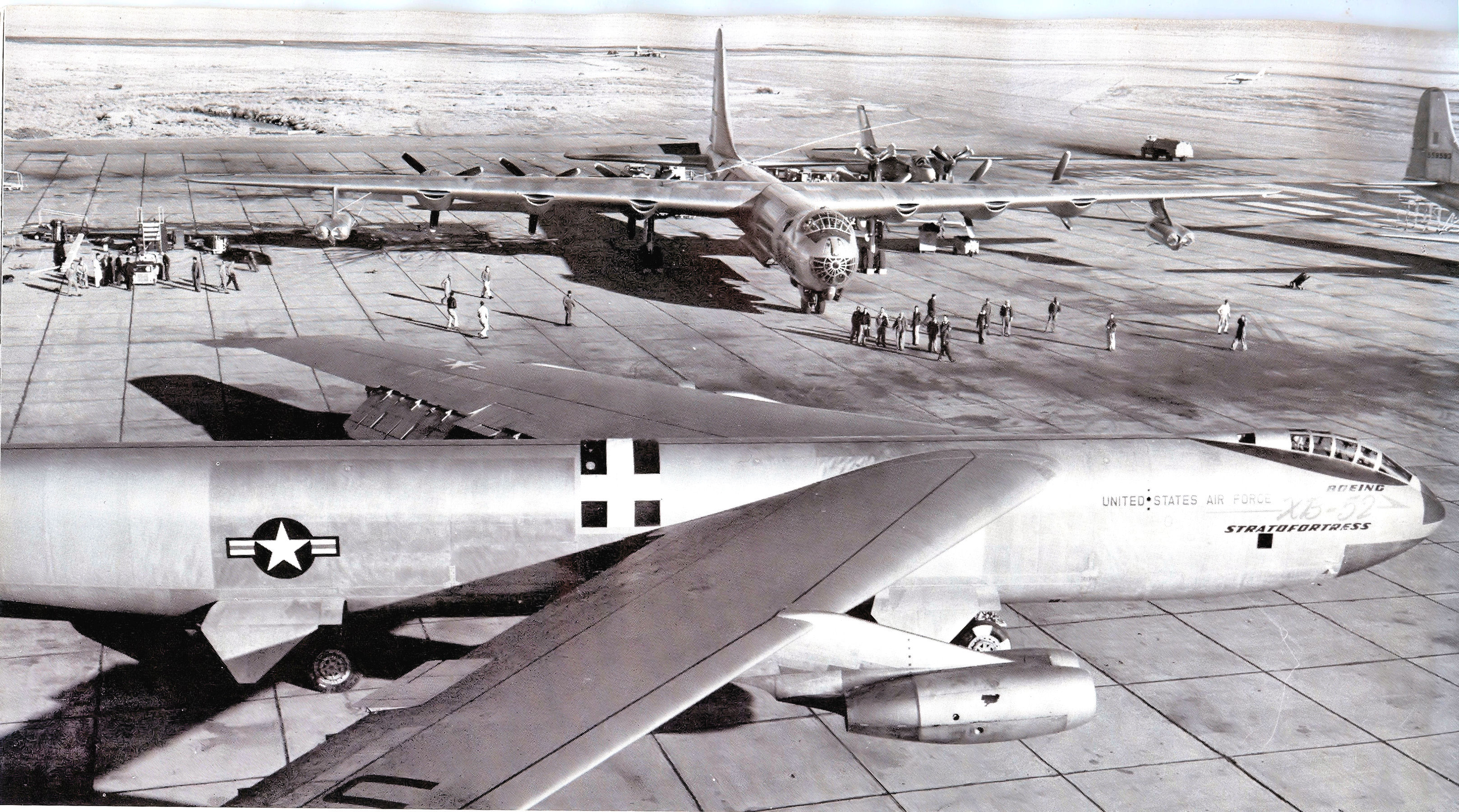
Prototype YB-52 bomber at Carswell AFB, c. 1955, shown with a 7th Bomb Wing B-36

On 10 December 1957, the 98th Bombardment Squadron was detached from the wing and assigned to the newly activated 4123d Strategic Wing at Carswell. This would become the first Boeing B-52 Stratofortress unit at Carswell. The 7th Bomb Wing officially became a B-52 organization with the adoption of manning documents and equipping authorizations on 1 February 1958.

On 19 February 1958, the 4123d Strategic Wing took possession of the first Boeing B-52 Stratofortress on Carswell. At the arrival ceremony on base, the bomber was named "The City of Fort Worth." It was subsequently assigned to the 98th Bombardment Squadron of the wing. Shortly following the arrival of B-52 bombers to the 4123rd Strategic Wing, the unit was moved to new facilities at Clinton-Sherman AFB, Oklahoma. With the acquisition of the Boeing B-52 Stratofortress, all new B-52 wings would operate with an air refueling squadron to support those bombers. As a result, SAC activated the 7th Air Refueling Squadron at Carswell on 1 April 1958, and assigned it to the wing. The squadron would be equipped with the Boeing KC-135 Stratotanker later in the year. In January 1959, B-52s from Carswell were constantly in the air and flying to Europe, Asia, and North Africa.

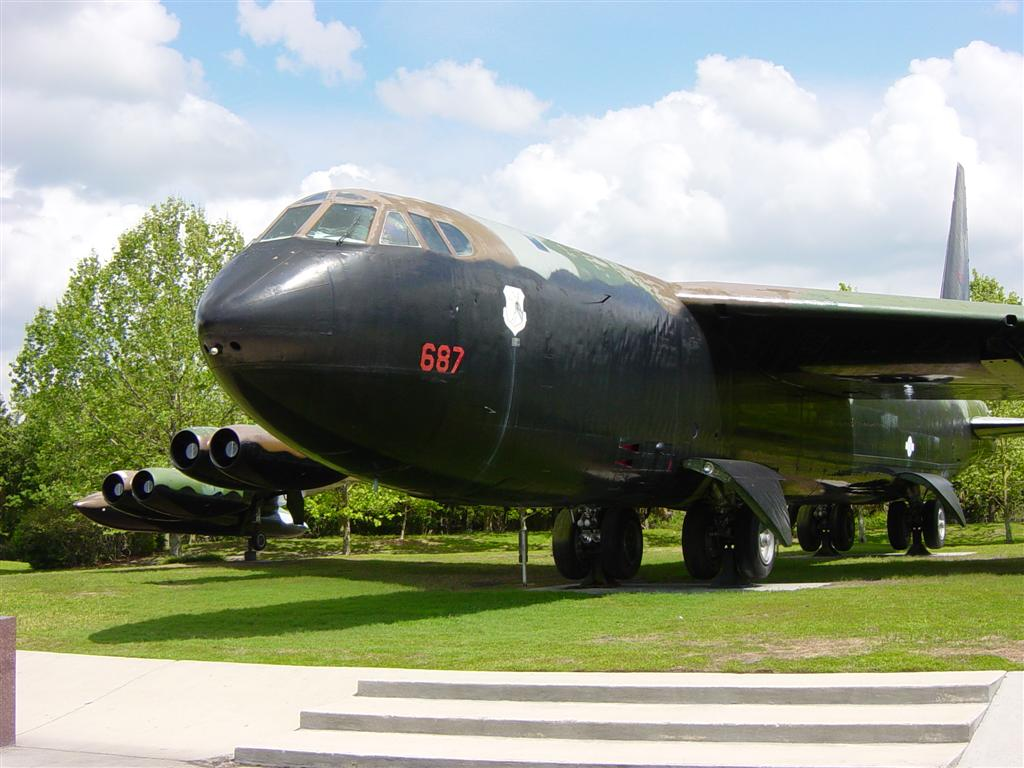
Boeing B-52D-40-BW Stratofortress, AF Serial No. 56-0687, on display at the B-52 Memorial Park, Orlando International Airport, Florida. This aircraft was flown to Orlando from Carswell AFB in 1984 for display at the former McCoy AFB, now Orlando International Airport, when the B-52D was being phased out of the SAC inventory.

Air Force One (VC-137C, serial number 62-6000) landed at Carswell AFB shortly after 11:00 pm on 21 November 1963 carrying President John F. Kennedy and his entourage to Fort Worth. The next morning, 22 November, President Kennedy returned to Carswell AFB at 11:25 am and boarded Air Force One for a 15-minute flight to Love Field, Dallas, Texas. It was the last use of Air Force One by President Kennedy before he was assassinated later that day in Dallas.

On 13 April 1965, the 7th Bomb Wing deployed its forces to Andersen Air Force Base, Guam to bomb the Socialist Republic of Vietnam. Most of the wing's bombers and tankers, along with aircrews and some support personnel, were deployed. At Andersen, the wing flew more than 1,300 missions over Vietnam, and returned to Carswell in December 1965.

B-52 crews were sent through an intensive two-week course on the B-52D, making them eligible for duty in Southeast Asia. B-52s assigned to combat duty in Vietnam were painted in a modified camouflage scheme with the undersides, lower fuselage, and both sides of the vertical fin being painted in a glossy black. The USAF serial number was painted in black on the fin over a horizontal red stripe across the length of the fin.

The B-52 effort was concentrated primarily against suspected Viet Cong targets in South Vietnam, but the Ho Chi Minh Trail and targets in Laos were also hit. During the relief of Khe Sanh, unbroken waves of six aircraft, attacking every three hours, dropped bombs as close as 900 feet (270 m) from friendly lines. Cambodia was increasingly bombed by B-52s from March 1969 onward.

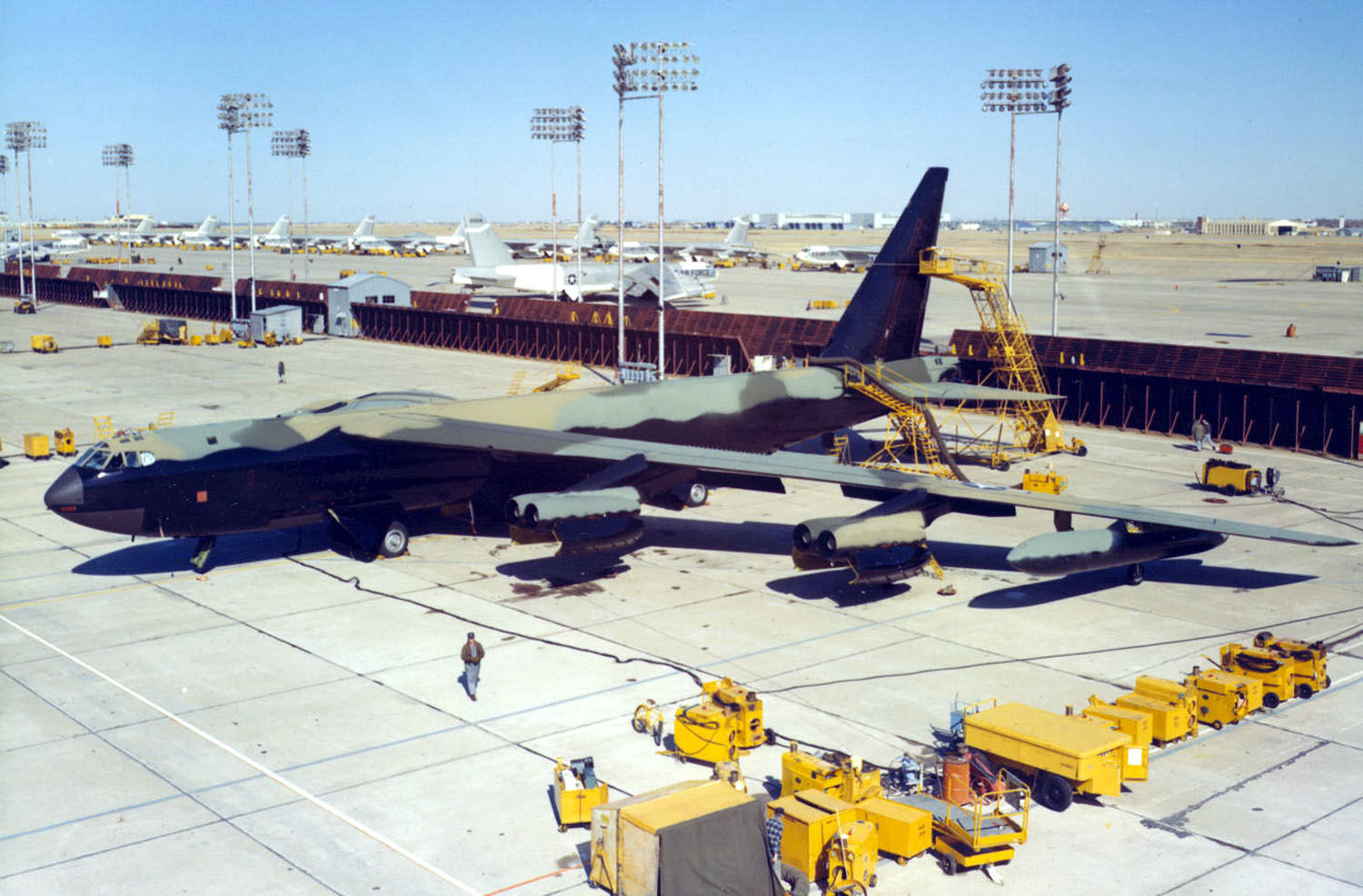
Flightline at Carswell AFB in the 1980s

Rotational deployments to Guam, and also to U-Tapao Royal Thai Navy Airfield, Thailand continued on a reduced scale until 1975. In the 1980s, the 7th received several new weapons systems, including modified B-52H aircraft. In 1983, B-52 crews began training with a new weapon system, the SRAM (Short Range Attack Missile) and later, in 1985, the ALCM (Air Launched Cruise Missile). Also, the wing flew numerous atmospheric sampling missions during 1986 and 1987 in response to the Chernobyl nuclear reactor accident; four B-52H aircraft (s/n 60-0024, 60–0033, 60-0051 and 60–0052) were modified to carry atmospheric sampling pods code-named "Giant Fish." These aircraft flew the mission into the 1990s from various bases including Carswell.

By 1984, Carswell was the largest unit of its kind in the Strategic Air Command. The 7th Bomb Wing contributed personnel to Operation Desert Storm in the Middle East in 1991. After an overwhelming victory in the Persian Gulf, the wing returned to Carswell. In September 1991 with the end of the Cold War, President Bush ordered a stand down of all nuclear-alert duties.

==== 43d Bombardment Wing ====
In January 1960, the USAF announced its intention to activate the first Convair B-58 Hustler wing. This was to be the 43d Bombardment Wing, (BW) at that time based at Davis-Monthan AFB, Arizona. The 43rd Bomb Wing would be moved to Carswell starting on 1 March. The 3958th Operational Test and Evaluation Group (then functioning as an integral unit at Carswell) would be transferred to the 43rd Bomb Wing upon its arrival.

On 1 August 1960, the USAF finally formally assumed B-58 operations responsibility and began testing. 59–2436, the first fully operational Hustler equipped with all tactical systems, was delivered to the 43rd. Two weeks later, the first TB-58A was delivered to Carswell.

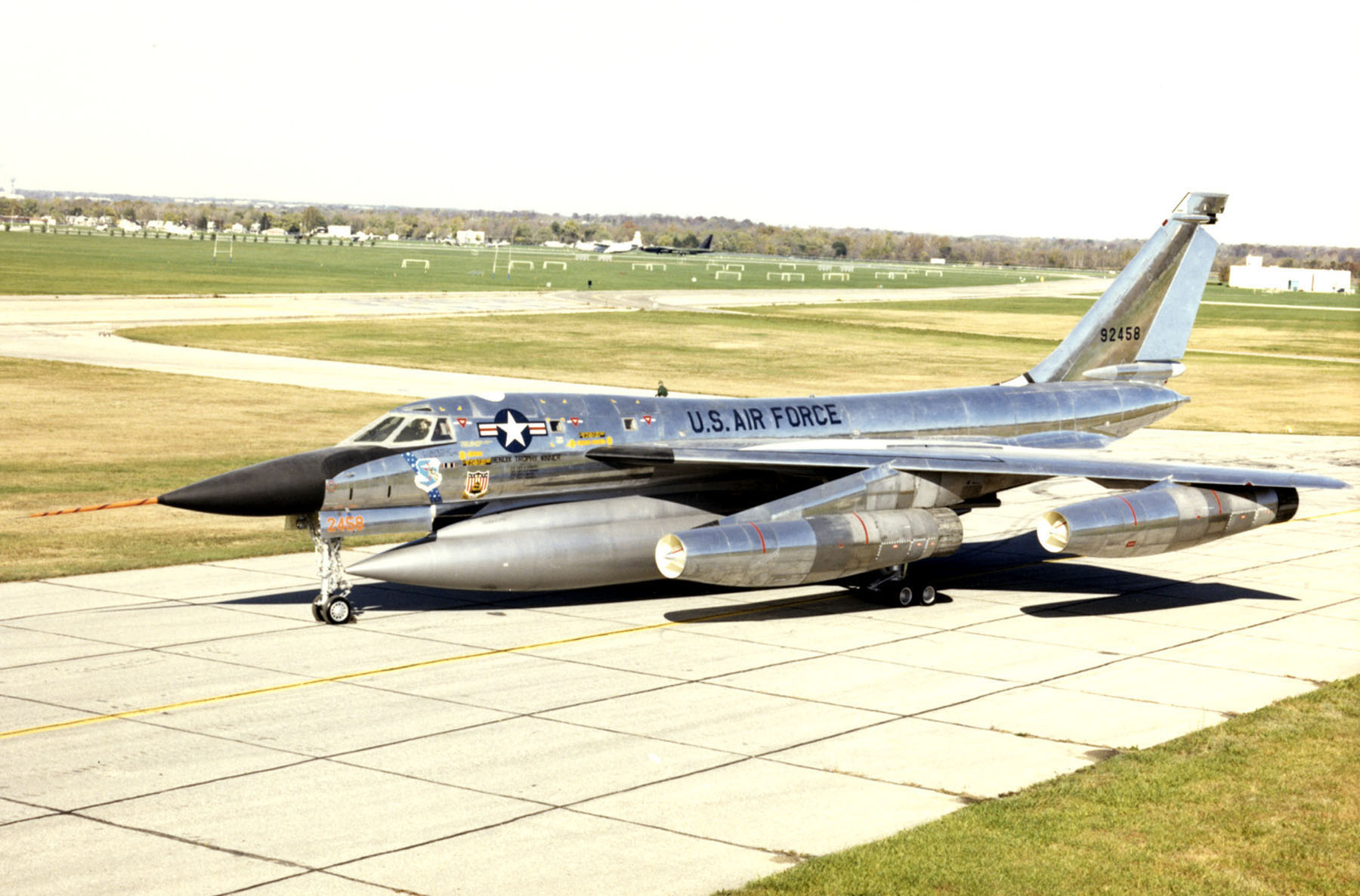
Convair B-58A-10-CF Hustler, AF Serial No. 59-2458, of the 43d Bomb Wing. This aircraft set transcontinental speed record on 5 March 62 by flying nonstop from Los Angeles to New York and back again. First leg at average speed of 1214.71 mph; return leg at average speed of 1081.77 mph. Return leg was first transcontinental flight that moved across the country faster than the rotational speed of the earth ("Chasing the Sun"). Crew awarded Bendix and Mackay Trophies. Now on display at the National Museum of the United States Air Force, Wright-Patterson Air Force Base, Ohio.

After July 1961, the wing continued further B-58 evaluations until June 1962. One of the first duties of the 43d was to operate a school to evaluate the new supersonic jet bomber.

On 12 January 1961, Major Henry J. Deutschendorf (singer John Denver's father) commanded a B-58 crew from the 43rd that set out to break six flight records; five of which the Soviet Union held. The Hustler flew two laps around a course with Edwards AFB, California, at one end and MCAS Yuma, Arizona at the other.

The bomber set three speed records over the 1000 kilometer (km) course with a 2000 kilogram (kg), 1000 kg, and 0 kg payload—averaging 1,200.194 miles per hour (mph) in each category. The crew managed an average speed of 1,061.88 mph (1,708.93 km/h) in each of the same payload categories over the 2000 km course. This flight set the pace for the 43rd with the B-58.

From then until the close of 1969, the wing served as one of two SAC B-58 wings with a strategic-bombardment mission.

One of the last things the wing did while at Carswell AFB took place on 28 March 1964, the day after a major earthquake devastated Alaska. Headquarters USAF tasked the 43rd to provide it with photographs of the region hit by the quake. Members of the 43rd flew two B-58s the 5,751 miles (9,255 km) to Alaska and back, processed the film, and then delivered the pictures to Washington DC 14.5 hours after the wing received the request. Six months later the 43rd Bomb Wing moved to Little Rock AFB, Arkansas.

=== Air Force Reserve ===
In addition to the SAC units, the United States Air Force Reserve's 916th Troop Carrier Group (916 TCG), flew Douglas C-124 Globemaster II aircraft from Carswell. The unit was activated on 1 April 1963. The group supported missions included military airlift to South Vietnam beginning in 1965 and to U.S. forces in the Dominican Republic during a 1965 crisis. It also participated in numerous humanitarian airlift missions. as well as performed tactical airlift missions within the United States.

Beginning in 1972, the 301st Fighter Wing (under various designations) has trained at Carswell as an Air Force Reserve (AFRES) and Air Force Reserve Command (AFRC) unit, training for tactical air missions, including counter-air, interdiction, and close air support. Originally gained by the former Tactical Air Command (TAC), the unit is now operationally gained by Air Combat Command (ACC).

The 301st replaced the Air Force Reserve's 916th Military Airlift Group (916 MAG), which was inactivated. The 301st's 457th Tactical Fighter Squadron (457 TFS) flew the F-105 Thunderchief from 1972 to 1982. It switched to the F-4 Phantom II in 1981, then to the F-16 Fighting Falcon in 1990. Conversion to the F-35 Lightning began in 2023. The wing has participated in exercises in the United States and abroad. It deployed a security police flight to Southwest Asia from January to March 1991 for Operation Desert Storm. In the mid-1990s, it participated in Operation Deny Flight in the Balkans. The tail code carried by today's 457th Fighter Squadron (457 FS) is "TX".

== Inactivation ==
In 1991, the Round II Base Closure Commission (BRAC 91) under the Defense Base Closure and Realignment Act of 1990 decided to close Carswell AFB, move the 7th Bomb Wing from Carswell to Dyess AFB, Texas, and switch it from the B-52 to the B-1 Lancer jet bomber.

When SAC was disestablished on 1 June 1992 as part of the Air Force's larger reorganization, Carswell and the 7th Bomb Wing were assigned to the new Air Combat Command (ACC); the wing's B-52Hs received the ACC tail code "CW". First-stage closure activities were begun in 1992; B-52Hs were moved to Barksdale AFB, Louisiana, by January 1993. The 7 BW was released of required operational capabilities on 1 January 1993, and was transferred to Dyess AFB without personnel or equipment on 1 October 1993.

In 1993, Congress directed the establishment of the nation's first joint reserve base under BRAC authority. Carswell ceased USAF active duty operations on 30 September 1993, and was transferred to the Air Force Base Conversion Agency for property distribution and reuse.

On 1 October 1993, the Air Force Reserve's 301st Fighter Wing assumed base responsibilities, establishing Carswell as Carswell Air Reserve Station. The Air Force Reserve's Headquarters, 10th Air Force (10 AF), also moved to Carswell from Bergstrom AFB, Texas, as a result of the BRAC action that closed Bergstrom AFB. The USAF ended operational control of Carswell AFB on 30 September 1994 with the transfer of the property to the United States Navy.

=== Naval Air Station Fort Worth ===
Map of NAS Fort Worth JRB

The base retained the name Carswell Air Force Base until 1993, when the BRAC Commission decided to move assets from Naval Air Station Dallas, which had also been marked for closure by BRAC, to Carswell. Recommissioned on 1 October 1994 as Naval Air Station Joint Reserve Base Fort Worth (but also retaining the name Carswell Field), two Marine Corps Reserve aviation squadrons and a small contingent of Navy personnel had permanently moved at that time and all moves were completed by 1998.

On September 20, 2009, the airfield was used as a refueling stop for the Shuttle Carrier Aircraft (SCA) piggybacking the Space Shuttle Discovery back to the Kennedy Space Center (KSC) from Amarillo after STS-128. The refueling was required by the orbiter's heavy payload, the Leonardo (ISS module) that carried wastes from the International Space Station. The tandem continued on to Barksdale Air Force Base, using most of the runway. This was the last flight of a Space Shuttle between Edwards Air Force Base and Kennedy Space Center; all of the remaining landings of the Shuttle were at KSC.

Naval Air Station Fort Worth Joint Reserve Base, part of Navy Installation Command's Navy Region Southeast, is a joint defense facility which plays a pivotal role in training and equipping air crews and aviation ground support personnel. The Navy Fort Worth "team" ensures reservists receive quality training in preparation for mobilization readiness; here to serve the reservists, tenants, and surrounding communities while accomplishing its primary purpose of defense readiness for the United States.

== Current operations ==
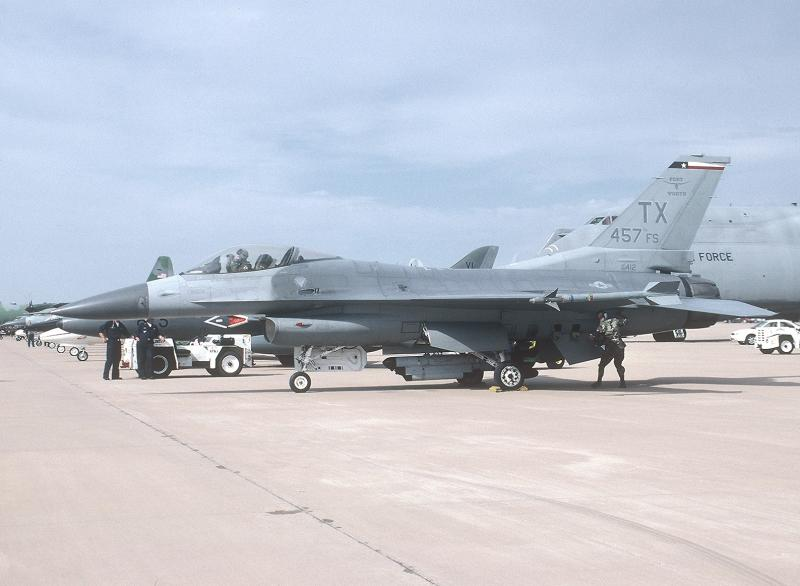
General Dynamics F-16C Block 30, AF Serial No. 85-1412 of the 301st Fighter Wing (AFRC), NAS Fort Worth JRB, Carswell Field, Texas

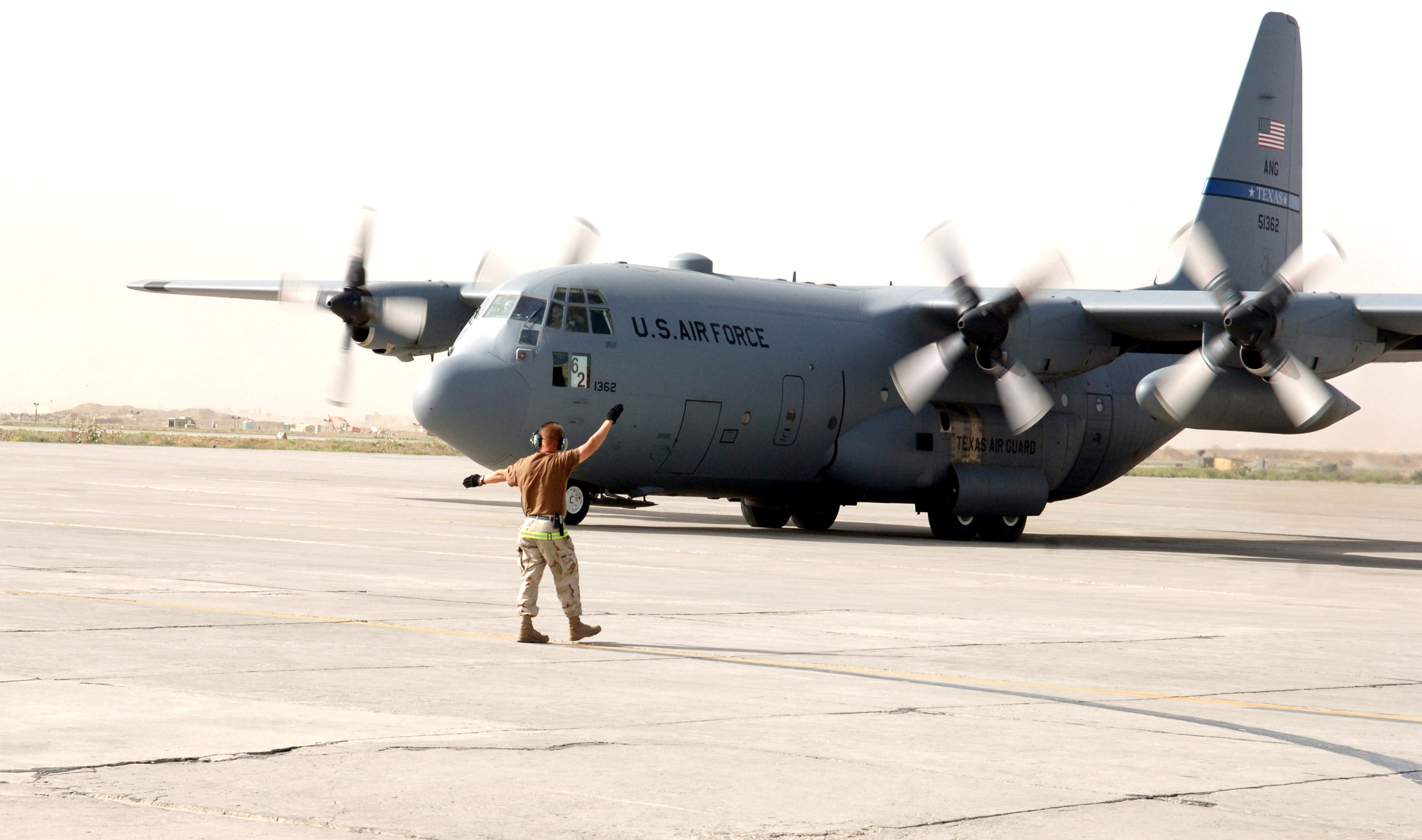
Lockheed C-130H-LM Hercules, AF Serial No. 85-1362 from the Texas Air National Guard's 136th Airlift Wing based at NAS Fort Worth JRB, Carswell Field on the ramp at Bagram AB, Afghanistan on Wednesday, 31 May 2006.

The base, now part of Navy Installations Command (CNIC), is under the oversight of Commander, Navy Region Southeast. It hosts a variety of fighter/attack and airlift units from the reserve components of Navy, Marine Corps and United States Air Force. Airfield operating procedures and equipment (e.g., PAR and ILS) reflect a combination of various service requirements (e.g., USN/USMC, USAF and US Army), although as the operator of the local air traffic control (ATC) system, the Department of the Navy imposes Navy procedures as the operations standard.

As of June 2011, there were 11,300 employees on NAS Fort Worth JRB (including active duty, Reserve, Air National Guard, and civilians).

NAS Fort Worth JRB units schedule a variety of airspace. The key area for fighter operations is the Brownwood Military Operations Area (Brownwood MOA). This MOA, originally developed to serve Commander, Naval Air Force Reserve (COMNAVAIRRESFOR) and 4th Marine Aircraft Wing (4th MAW) fighter and fighter/attack squadrons stationed at the former Naval Air Station Dallas, now serves as the primary airspace resource for all fighter/attack units assigned to NAS Fort Worth JRB. It is scheduled by the NAS Fort Worth Operations Department; consolidated scheduling was evaluated for a period of time and the decision made to return this area to the Navy for scheduling. Nevertheless, user comments indicate that access to the area is allocated to its several users on a fair and equitable basis.

The recent decision to join the Brady and Brownwood MOAs will provide additional maneuver airspace for Air Intercept Control/Air Combat Maneuvering (AIC/ACM) training. When scheduled concurrently, these areas enable numerous aircraft from several units to participate in joint fighter/bomber training exercises. Brownwood MOA is the subject of an innovative test to improve the dissemination of SUA status information to non-participating aircraft. This test, conducted to address action items in meeting Federal Aviation Administration (FAA) Free Flight planning commitments, will use a combination of recently deployed airspace scheduling and reporting systems, including the FAA's Special-Use Airspace Management System (SAMS) and the Department of Defense Military Airspace Management System (MAMS). The intent of the trial is to provide more accurate "near real-time" area status via the internet to civilian users, especially to regional air carriers particularly affected by required rerouting around Brownwood MOA. Should the test and the technology prove successful and cost-effective, the result could address long-standing civilian dissatisfaction with the quality and timeliness of FAA-distributed special use airspace status information. In particular, such functionality may be appropriate for incorporation into the next generation of Automated Flight Service Station (AFSS) modernization equipment.

The base's runway is also used by Lockheed Martin Aeronautics, as their large Fort Worth assembly facility (where the F-35 Lightning II is built) is located adjacent to the base.

The base has an Army and Air Force Exchange Service post exchange and a Commissary.

The current (13th) Commanding Officer of NAS Fort Worth JRB is Captain Mark McLean, USN.

Federal Medical Center, Carswell, a Federal Bureau of Prisons facility, is located in the northeast corner of NAS Fort Worth JRB, utilizing the facility that was formerly the USAF Hospital for Carswell AFB. Its address is Building 3000 along J Street.

== Tenant commands ==
=== United States Navy Reserve ===
- Headquarters, NAS Fort Worth JRB
- Commander, Fleet Logistics Support Wing (COMFLELOGSUPWING, or CFLSW)
  - Fleet Logistics Support Squadron 59 (VR-59) C-40A Clipper
- Commander Tactical Support Wing (CTSW)
- Branch Health & Dental Clinic, Detachment Fort Worth
- Commander Naval Reserve Intelligence Command
- Reserve Intelligence Area Southeast (RIASE)
- NAVSUP Fleet Logistics Center JAX Detachment Fort Worth
- Fleet Readiness Center Reserve Mid-West (FRCRMW)
- Fleet Readiness Center Reserve Mid-West, Detachment Fort Worth (FRCRMW Det Fort Worth)
- Maritime Expeditionary Security Detachment 1 Detachment D (MSRON 1 Det D)
- Naval Air Technical Data And Engineering Service Command Detachment
- Naval Air Warfare Center Weapons Division Detachment
- Navy Operations Support Center, Fort Worth (NOSC)
- NCTAMS Lant Detachment BCO
- Navy Region Southeast, Reserve Component Command-Fort Worth
- Expeditionary Medical Facility Dallas One (EMF Dallas One)

=== United States Marine Corps Reserve ===
- Marine Aircraft Group 41 (MAG-41)
  - Marine Fighter Attack Squadron 112 (VMFA-112)
  - Marine Aerial Refueler Transport Squadron 234 (VMGR-234)
  - Marine Transport Squadron 1 (VMR-1)
- 14th Marine Regiment
- Marine Air Control Squadron 24 (MACS-24)

=== United States Marine Corps Recruiting Command ===
- Headquarters, 8th Marine Corps Recruiting District (HQ, 8MCD)

=== United States Air Force Reserve ===
- Headquarters, Tenth Air Force (10 AF)
- 301st Fighter Wing (301 FW) F-16C/D Block 30
  - 457th Fighter Squadron (Reserve)

=== United States Army Reserve ===
- 370th Chemical Company
- 607th Military Police Battalion
- 90th Aviation Support Battalion
- Alpha Company, 6th Battalion, 52d Aviation Regiment

=== Texas Air National Guard ===
- 136th Airlift Wing (136 AW)
- 136th Operation Group (136 OG)
  - 181st Airlift Squadron (181 AS) C-130H
  - 181st Airlift Control Flight (181 ACF)
  - 136th Operations Support Flight (136 OSF)
- 136th Mission Support Group (136 MSG)
  - 136th Civil Engineer Squadron (136 CES)
- 531st Air Force Band

=== United States Air Force ===
- 495th Fighter Group - F-16C/D Block 30
  - 24th Fighter Squadron (Active Associate)

== Major U.S. Air Force Commands to which assigned ==
- Second Air Force, c. 26 June 1942
- Army Air Forces Flying Training Command, 30 June 1942
- Second Air Force, 21 November 1944
- Continental Air Forces, 15 April 1945

Redesignated: Strategic Air Command, 21 March 1946

- Air Combat Command, 1 June 1992 – 30 September 1993

=== Former units ===
- 404th Base HQ and Air Base Sq, 18 August 1942 – 1 May 1944
- Army Air Forces Combat Crew School

Redesignated: Army Air Forces Pilot School, Specialized 4-Engine, 28 July 1942 – 1 January 1946

- 96th Pilot Transition Training Group (4 Engine), 28 July 1942 – 1 April 1944
- Army Air Forces Flying Training Command

Redesignated: Army Air Forces Training Command, 21 August 1942 – 24 February 1946

- 2519th AAF Base Unit (Pilot School, Spec 4E), 1 May 1944 – 18 November 1945
- 17th Bombardment Operational Training Wing, 24 December 1945 – 9 April 1946
- 31st Flying Training Wing, 31 May 1945 – 30 December 1945
- 233d AAF (later AF) Base Unit, 18 November 1945 – 17 November 1947
- 7th Bombardment Group, 1 October 1946 – 10 June 1952

7th Bombardment Wing, 17 November 1947 – 1 October 1993

- 58th Bombardment Wing, 9 May 1946 – 1 March 1948
- Eighth Air Force, 1 November 1946 – 1 August 1948
- 11th Bombardment Group, 1 December 1948 – 16 June 1952

11th Bombardment Wing, 16 February 1951 – 13 December 1957

- 19th Air Division, 16 February 1951 – 16 June 1952; 16 June 1952 – 30 September 1988.
- 4123d Strategic Wing, 10 December 1957 – 25 February 1959
- 43d Bombardment Wing, 15 March 1960 – 1 September 1964
- 916th Troop Carrier Group

Redesignated: 916th Military Airlift Group (AFRES), 1 April 1963 – 8 July 1972

- 512th Troop Carrier Wing

Redesignated: 512th Military Airlift Wing (AFRES): 8 January 1965 – 29 June 1971

- 301st Tactical Fighter Wing (AFRES), 1 July 1972 – 30 September 1994

=== Previous names ===
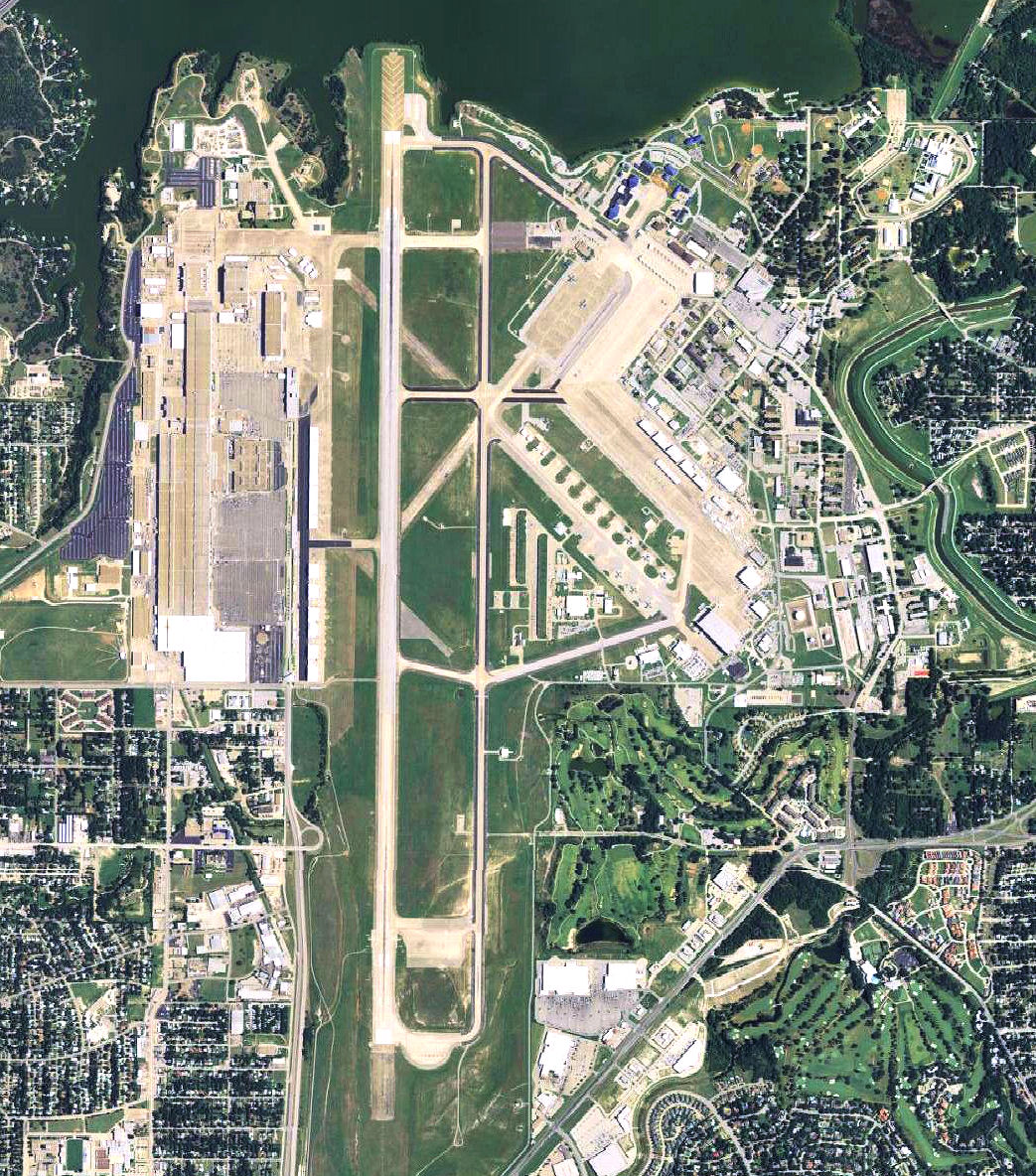
NAS Fort Worth JRB (Carswell Field), TX, c. 2006

- Army Air Forces Combat Crew School, Tarrant Field (aka Tarrant Field and Tarrant Field Airdrome), c. 1 July 1942
- Fort Worth Army Air Field, 29 July 1942 – 13 January 1948
- Griffiss Air Force Base, 13 January 1948 – 29 January 1948
- Carswell Air Force Base, 29 January 1948 – 30 September 1994

=== Strategic Air Command aircraft previously assigned ===
- Boeing B-29 Superfortress (bomber)
- Convair B-36 Peacemaker (bomber; piston and jet-driven)
- Boeing B-52 Stratofortress (bomber) F, D H
- Convair B-58 Hustler (supersonic bomber)
- Boeing KC-97 Stratofreighter (aerial refueling aircraft)
- Boeing KC-135 Stratotanker (jet aerial refueling aircraft)

== In popular culture ==
- Strategic Air Command, starring James Stewart, was partly filmed at the base.
- On the NBC television series The West Wing, Democratic presidential nominee Matt Santos (Jimmy Smits) reported for Marine Corps Reserve duty at Fort Worth for F/A-18 Hornet flight operations. The show incorrectly referred to the base as "National Guard Training Center Fort Worth" and the squadron shown was VMFA-134, the "Smokes". In reality, the "Smokes" were stationed at Marine Corps Air Station Miramar prior to their 2007 transition to cadre status. The Marine Corps Reserve F/A-18 squadron actually based at NAS Fort Worth JRB is VMFA-112, the "Cowboys".

== See also ==
- 34th Flying Training Wing (World War II)
- Grand Prairie Armed Forces Reserve Complex
- List of airports in Texas
- List of United States Navy airfields
- Strategic Air Command (film)
- Texas World War II Army Airfields
