= 136th Brigade =

136th Brigade may refer to:

- 136th Separate Guards Motor Rifle Brigade, Russia
- 136th Mixed Brigade, Spain
- 136th (2/1st Devon and Cornwall) Brigade, United Kingdom
- 136th Maneuver Enhancement Brigade, United States

== See also ==
- 136th Division (disambiguation)
- 136th Regiment (disambiguation)
