= 136 Austria =

Main-belt asteroid

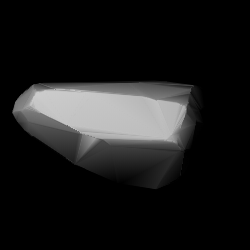
- 3D convex shape model of 136 Austria

Discovery
- Discovered by: Johann Palisa
- Discovery site: Austrian Naval Obs.
- Discovery date: 18 March 1874

Designations
- Named after: Austria
- Alternative designations: A874 FA · 1950 HT (Note: The MPC notates Austria's retroactive new-style designation as 1874 FA.)
- Minor planet category: main-belt · (inner) background

Orbital characteristics
- Epoch 23 March 2018 (JD 2458200.5)
- Uncertainty parameter 0
- Observation arc: 141.11 yr (51,539 d)
- Aphelion: 2.4812 AU
- Perihelion: 2.0927 AU
- Semi-major axis: 2.2869 AU
- Eccentricity: 0.0849
- Orbital period (sidereal): 3.46 yr (1,263 d)
- Mean anomaly: 102.82°
- Mean motion: 0° 17^{m} 6^{s} / day
- Inclination: 9.5788°
- Longitude of ascending node: 186.46°
- Time of perihelion: 2024-Feb-24
- Argument of perihelion: 132.95°

Physical characteristics
- Mean diameter: 40.14±1.0 km 40.14 km
- Mass: 6.8×10^{16} kg
- Synodic rotation period: 11.4969 h (0.47904 d)
- Geometric albedo: 0.1459±0.007; 0.1459
- Spectral type: M
- Absolute magnitude (H): 9.69

136 Austria is a main-belt asteroid that was found by the prolific asteroid discoverer Johann Palisa on 18 March 1874, from the Austrian Naval Observatory in Pola, Istria. It was his first asteroid discovery and was given the Latin name of his homeland. This object is orbiting the Sun at a distance of 2.29 AU with an eccentricity of 0.08 and an orbital period of 3.46 years. The orbital plane is inclined at an angle of 9.6° to the plane of the ecliptic.

The cross-sectional diameter of this asteroid is 40.14 km. Based upon its spectrum, it is classified as a metallic M-type spectrum, although Clark et al. (1994) suggest it may be more like a stony S-type asteroid. It shows almost no absorption features in the near infrared, which may indicate an iron or enstatite chondrite surface composition. A weak hydration feature was detected in 2006.

Photometric observations of this asteroid at the European Southern Observatory in 1981 gave a light curve with a period of 11.5 ± 0.1 hours and a brightness variation of 0.40 in magnitude. As of 2013, the estimated rotation period is 11.4969 hours.
