= 136 BC =

136 BC in various calendars
- Gregorian calendar: 136 BC; CXXXVI BC
- Ab urbe condita: 618
- Ancient Egypt era: XXXIII dynasty, 188
- Pharaoh: Ptolemy VIII Physcon, 10
- Ancient Greek Olympiad (summer): 161st Olympiad (victor)¹
- Assyrian calendar: 4615
- Balinese saka calendar: N/A
- Bengali calendar: −729 – −728
- Berber calendar: 815
- Buddhist calendar: 409
- Burmese calendar: −773
- Byzantine calendar: 5373–5374
- Chinese calendar: 甲辰年 (Wood Dragon); 2562 or 2355 — to — 乙巳年 (Wood Snake); 2563 or 2356
- Coptic calendar: −419 – −418
- Discordian calendar: 1031
- Ethiopian calendar: −143 – −142
- Hebrew calendar: 3625–3626
- Hindu calendars
- Vikram Samvat: −79 – −78
- Shaka Samvat: N/A
- Kali Yuga: 2965–2966
- Holocene calendar: 9865
- Iranian calendar: 757 BP – 756 BP
- Islamic calendar: 780 BH – 779 BH
- Javanese calendar: N/A
- Julian calendar: N/A
- Korean calendar: 2198
- Minguo calendar: 2047 before ROC 民前2047年
- Nanakshahi calendar: −1603
- Seleucid era: 176/177 AG
- Thai solar calendar: 407–408
- Tibetan calendar: ཤིང་ཕོ་འབྲུག་ལོ་ (male Wood-Dragon) −9 or −390 or −1162 — to — ཤིང་མོ་སྦྲུལ་ལོ་ (female Wood-Snake) −8 or −389 or −1161

Year 136 BC was a year of the pre-Julian Roman calendar. At the time it was known as the Year of the Consulship of Philus and Serranus (or, less frequently, year 618 Ab urbe condita) and the Fifth Year of Jianyuan. The denomination 136 BC for this year has been used since the early medieval period, when the Anno Domini calendar era became the prevalent method in Europe for naming years.

== Events ==
=== By place ===
==== China ====
- Confucianism is adopted as the state religion in China by Emperor Wu.

==== Greece ====
- Carneades retires as head of the Platonic Academy and is replaced by Polemarchus of Nicomedia.

==== Rome ====
- Censorship of Appius Claudius Pulcher and Quintus Fulvius Nobilior.

==== Spain ====
- The Romans hand Gaius Hostilius Mancinus over to the Numantians in order to repudiate his peace treaty with them.

== Births ==
=== By place ===
==== Rome ====
- Lucius Gellius, politician and general.
