= 136th Illinois Infantry Regiment =

- Active: June 1–October 30, 1864
- Disbanded: October 30, 1864
- Country: United States
- Allegiance: Union
- Branch: Infantry
- Size: Regiment
- Garrison/HQ: Columbus, Kentucky
- Engagements: American Civil War

Commanders
- Colonel: Frederick A. Johns

The 136th Illinois Infantry Regiment was an infantry regiment from Illinois that served in the Union Army between June 1 and October 30, 1864, during the American Civil War.

== Service ==
The regiment was organized at Centralia, Illinois, and mustered in for one-hundred day service on June 1, 1864. In early June, they received marching orders to proceed by rail to Cairo, Illinois, from where they sailed with Fort Pillow as the boat's destination. On the regiment's arrival at Columbus, Kentucky, information that General Nathan Bedford Forrest would attack Fort Pillow was found to be incorrect. General Forrest's target was Columbus, an attack which didn't eventuate. The regiment remained there and performed garrison duty until September 26.

While stationed at Columbus, information was received that General Forrest and his Confederate troops, would attack Paducah, Kentucky, and the regiment was ordered to march out and intercept Forrest's troops. On August 12, the expedition marched to Mayfield, Kentucky, but learned the Confederate troops had changed direction and captured Memphis, Tennessee.

Returning to Columbus, the regiment reenlisted for a further fifteen days. The regiment was ordered from Columbus to Chicago, however, en route to Chicago, General Sterling Price's troops were in the process of raiding Missouri, and the 136th was ordered to Missouri. Having arrived at St. Louis, Missouri, and camped at Benton Barracks, the regiment was divided and companies sent to various forts throughout St. Louis, until October 15. From Missouri, the regiment moved to Camp Butler, Illinois, and on October 30 was mustered out. The 136th Regiment was never in a regular battle, though performed occasional raids against guerrillas. During its service the regiment had four men killed and lost forty men to disease.

== See also ==
- List of Illinois Civil War Units

== Bibliography ==
- Dyer, Frederick H. (1959). A Compendium of the War of the Rebellion. New York and London. Thomas Yoseloff, Publisher. LCCN 59-12963.
- Reece. Brigadier General J.N. (1900). The Report of Illinois from Military and Naval Department of the Adjutant General of the State of Illinois. Containing Reports for the Years 1861–1866. Springfield, Illinois. Journal Company, Printers and Binders.
