= Grand Prairie Armed Forces Reserve Complex =

Grand Prairie Armed Forces Reserve Complex Hensley Field
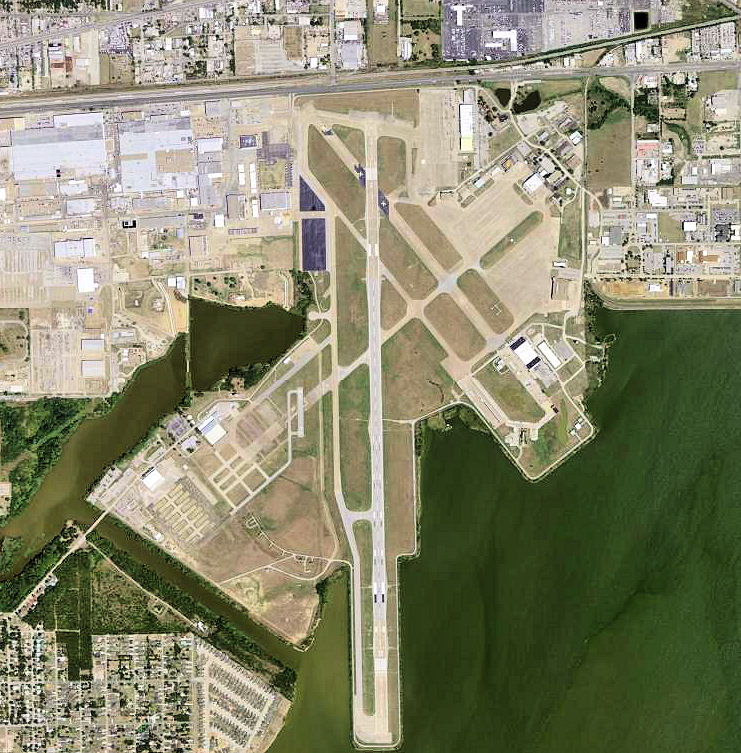
- NAS Dallas – 2006 USGS Airphoto
- IATA: none; ICAO: 7TX2

Summary
- Airport type: Public
- Serves: Dallas, Texas
- Coordinates: 32°44′24″N 96°58′12″W

Map
- Location of Grand Prairie AFRC

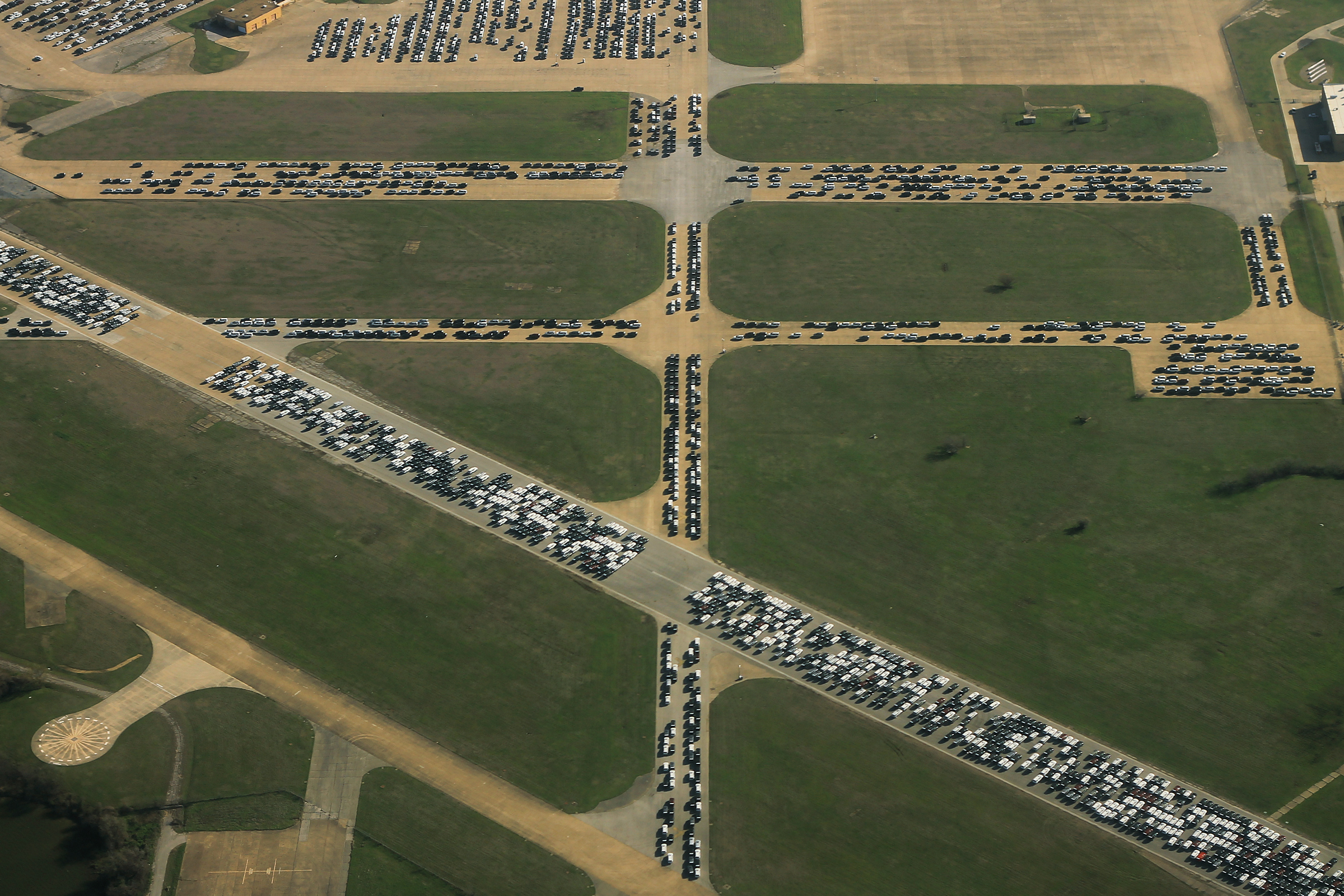
Parked cars on the taxiways after closure

The Grand Prairie Armed Forces Reserve Complex or Grand Prairie AFRC (formerly Naval Air Station Dallas or Hensley Field) is a former United States Navy Naval Air Station located on Mountain Creek Lake in southwest Dallas. The installation was established as an Army aviation center, and eventually became home to aviation assets from all the military services.

In December 1998, Base Realignment and Closure (BRAC) action decommissioned the naval air station; transferred Carswell AFB to the U.S. Navy and renamed it Naval Air Station Joint Reserve Base Fort Worth / Carswell Field; and sent Grand Prairie's Naval Air Reserve, Marine Air Reserve and Texas Air National Guard flying units (wings, groups, squadrons) to Carswell.

The former NAS Dallas was later recommissioned as the Grand Prairie Armed Forces Reserve Complex, with the half that housed the aircraft-related facilities (such as the runway, hangars, etc.) going to the Texas Air National Guard, and the half with most non-aircraft related facilities going to the U.S. Army Reserve and a small area to the U.S. Marine Corps Reserve. Vought Aircraft Industries operated a government-owned, contractor-operated (GOCO) plant next to Grand Prairie AFRC until 2014. In 2019 the site was redeveloped into a distribution center for The Home Depot, which opened in 2021.

Soon after the BRAC closure, ownership of 738 acres (299 ha) of the former base was transferred from the U.S. government to the city of Dallas, but plans to redevelop the land for other uses have been stalled since 2001 due to the U.S. Navy's failure to clean up environmental contamination that occurred while the site was used by the military.

== History ==
The City of Dallas established Hensley Field in August 1929 as a training field for Reserve pilots of the then-U.S. Army Air Corps. The facility was named for Major William N. Hensley, a flying instructor located near Dallas in the 1920s and one of the few on board the first trans-Atlantic dirigible crossing in 1919.

The city leased the site to the United States Army for a dollar a year. The field became the Air Corps Reserve Base in the Eighth Corps Area. At the beginning of World War II, the Army extended their lease to 40 years. In March 1941, the U.S. Navy began maintaining operations at the base and shortly afterward established a Naval Air Reserve Base on 160 acres (0.7 km^{2}) adjacent to Hensley Field.

In December 1941, Hensley Field became headquarters of the Midwest Area of the Air Corps Ferrying Command, after Major Thomas D. Ferguson, commander of the field, was made control officer for the Middle West Area of the United States. Hensley Field was the first base of operations for the 455th Bombardment Group of the United States Army Air Forces.

The installation became Naval Air Station Dallas on 1 January 1943. Its initial mission was to provide primary flight training for Naval Aviation Cadets destined for commissioned service as Naval Aviators in the Navy, Marine Corps, and Coast Guard. Enlisted personnel destined for aviation duty with the Fleet were also trained at NAS Dallas, and at one time a number of Free French aviators received flight training at the installation.

During World War II, the base also served as a radial engine repair station, with thousands of engines overhauled. NAS Dallas also handled all air traffic for the adjacent North American Aircraft Company plant and was the flight test facility and the receiving station for 4,400 SNJ Texan training aircraft manufactured at that plant.

In early 1946, Congress appropriated funds to establish a Naval Reserve training program at NAS Dallas and by March of that year the Naval Reserve had taken over the field. The Marine Air Reserve Training Command also established itself there at that time. Naval and Marine Corps Reservists from across the nation, but primarily from Texas, Oklahoma, and eastern New Mexico continued to train at NAS Dallas. Hensley Field passed from the command of the U.S. Air Force to that of the U.S. Navy on 30 September 1949, but the field continued to serve as an Air Force Reserve training center. The Air Force conducted air operations for the Air Force Reserve, the Texas Air National Guard, and for the USAF Civil Air Patrol regional liaison office. In 1950, one of the Naval Air Reserve squadrons stationed at NAS Dallas was the first Naval Air Reserve squadron to be called to active service in the Korean War. The station continued to grow with the construction of newer, longer runways and jet aircraft were assigned to NAS Dallas in 1952.

In 1963, the base was the first Naval Air Reserve installation to operate the F-8 Crusader until later transitioning to the F-4 Phantom II in both of its two Naval Reserve fighter squadrons and its single Marine Reserve fighter/attack squadron in the 1970s. The mid-1980s brought to the installation some of the Navy's most sophisticated aircraft, including the F-14 Tomcat and the C-9 Skytrain II. By 1990, there were 2,057 active duty personnel on the base, with an additional 6,789 part-time Reservists and Air National Guardsmen assigned to the station. The total economic impact of the base by then was almost $76 million. By the following year, more than 1,700 soldiers, sailors, airmen and marines had been deployed from the base to the Persian Gulf in support of the Gulf War.

The installation was closed in 1998 as part of the 1993 Base Realignment and Closure Commission conducted by the Department of Defense, but was partially reopened in the early 21st-century as the Grand Prairie Armed Forces Reserve Complex to accommodate expanding military training requirements for the Reserve components of the United States Armed Forces. Ownership of remaining areas of the complex was transferred by the U.S. Navy to the city of Dallas, which sought to redevelop the site as a mixed-use development; however, the plans stalled when it was discovered that various areas of the site are contaminated with toxins including jet fuel, lead paint and DDT. The city then sued the navy; a settlement was reached in May 2001, with the navy agreeing to pay the city US$18.55 million for having violated various environmental regulations and rendered redevelopment infeasible, and agreeing to spend another $34.65 million over the ensuing 15 years to clean up the complex.

On 1 May 2016, Cedars Neighborhood Association president Michael Sitarzewski presented a proposal to Dallas mayor Mike Rawlings and Dallas City Council members to use part of the city-owned AFRC facility as an encampment for homeless people who were being evicted from a large tent city under Interstate 45 near downtown Dallas in response to persistent complaints from Cedars residents about an over-concentration of homeless in the neighborhood. The proposed encampment—to be called Camp Dignity—would include an open-air tent camping area, tiny homes, boarding houses, fruit and vegetable gardens, and on-site work opportunities to give residents the ability to transition to more permanent housing and jobs. City officials did not comment on the proposal.

In February 2017, it was revealed that the U.S. Navy had violated the 2001 environmental settlement, having inexplicably failed to formulate and implement a plan to clean up the contamination, despite having been granted an extension. According to letters between the navy and the city, the cleanup could take another 15 years and cost an additional $27 million. At that time—unable to redevelop the site for other uses—the city had leased various areas for industrial uses such as storage of surplus road vehicles.

On 26 August 2020, the Dallas City Council announced the signing of a $2 million contract for a new master plan to redevelop 738 acres (299 ha) of the site, although city officials said that efforts to clean up the contamination remained stalled, and council member Tennell Atkins conceded that the master plan may take decades to implement.

== Tenant units ==
- Texas Army National Guard
  - 176th Engineer Brigade
  - 156th Brigade Engineer Battalion, HHC, Companies C and D
  - Company D, 2d General Support Aviation Battalion, 149th Aviation Regiment
  - B Company, 449th Aviation Support Battalion, Det 2
  - 124th Cavalry Regiment, Troop C, 1st Squadron
  - 142nd Infantry Regiment, Company B, 2nd Battalion
- Texas Air National Guard
  - 254th Combat Communications Group (254 CCG)
  - 221st Combat Communications Squadron (221 CCS)
- United States Marine Corps Reserve
  - 2nd Battalion, 14th Marines
- United States Army Reserve
  - 300th Sustainment Brigade
  - 350th Human Resources Company
  - 80th Command Army Reserve (Institutional Training)
  - 607th Military Police Battalion
  - 63d RD Casualty Operations Branch
  - 721st Engineer Company
  - 12th Battalion Army Reserve Career Group
  - 223rd Ordnance Company
  - 107th Chaplain Detachment
  - 490th Civil Affairs Battalion
  - 2nd Team, 1st Judge Advocate General Detachment
  - 3rd Team, 1st Judge Advocate General Detachment
  - 10th Team, 1st Judge Advocate General Detachment
  - 425th Military Police Detachment
  - 206th Public Affairs Detachment
  - 7th Battalion, 95th Regiment
  - 14th Battalion, 95th Regiment
  - 2nd Battalion, 354th Regiment
  - 15th Quartermaster Detachment
  - 451 Engineer Detachment (AREA CLEARANCE)
- Federal Bureau of Prisons
  - Designation & Sentence Computation Center
  - Human Resource Services Center
  - Field Acquisition Office

== See also ==
- Texas World War II Army Airfields
