= 181st Airlift Squadron =

181st Airlift Squadron

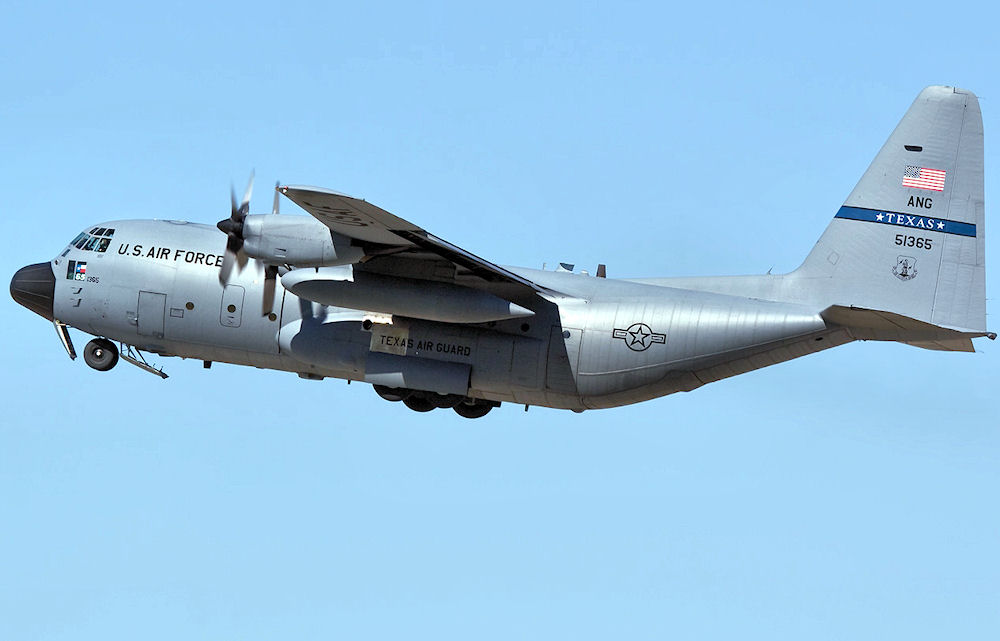
- 181st Airlift Squadron C-130H Hercules (Note: Aircraft is Lockheed C-130H-LM Hercules, serial 85-1365.)
- Active: 1943–1946; 1947–present
- Country: United States
- Allegiance: Texas
- Branch: Air National Guard
- Type: Squadron
- Role: Airlift
- Part of: Texas Air National Guard
- Garrison/HQ: Naval Air Station Joint Reserve Base Fort Worth, Texas
- Nickname: Panzer Dusters (World War II)
- Engagements: European Theater of Operations
- Decorations: Distinguished Unit Citation; Air Force Outstanding Unit Award; Belgian Fourragère

Insignia
- 181st Airlift Squadron emblem

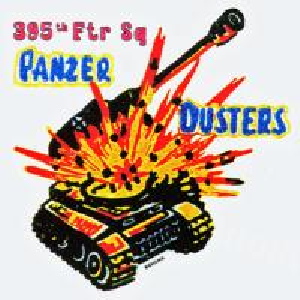
- 395th Fighter Squadron emblem
- Tail stripe: Blue stripe inscribed Texas between two stars
- World War II fuselage code: A7

The 181st Airlift Squadron is a unit of the 136th Airlift Wing of the Texas Air National Guard stationed at Naval Air Station Joint Reserve Base Fort Worth, Texas. The 181st is equipped with the Lockheed C-130J Hercules.

It was first activated in June 1943 as The 395th Fighter Squadron, assigned to the 368th Fighter Group. After training in the United States, it moved to the European Theater of Operations, where it served in combat until the spring of 1945 with Ninth Air Force, earning a Distinguished Unit Citation and a Belgian Fourragère for its actions. Following V-E Day, the squadron served in the army of occupation at AAF Station Straubing, Germany until was inactivated on 20 August 1946 and transferred its personnel and equipment to another unit, which was activated in its place.

The squadron was allotted to the United States National Guard as the 181st Fighter Squadron and was activated in 1947. It served in the Dallas-Fort Worth metroplex as a fighter squadron until the early 1960s, when it assumed an air refueling mission, which continued until 1978, and has been an airlift unit since then.

== History ==
=== World War II ===
==== Organization and training ====
The squadron was first organized at Westover Field, Massachusetts in June 1943 as the 395th Fighter Squadron, one of the original squadrons of the 368th Fighter Group. The squadron drew its initial cadre from the 326th Fighter Group, an Operational Training Unit at Westover. In June 1943, the cadre of the squadron travelled to Orlando Army Air Base for training at the Army Air Forces School of Applied Tactics.

The 395th trained with Republic P-47 Thunderbolts, moving to Farmingdale Army Air Field, New York to complete its training. The squadron and group left Farmingdale for the Port of Embarkation, Camp Myles Standish on 20 December 1943 and boarded the SS Argentina to sail for Great Britain on 29 December, arriving at the Firth of Clyde on 7 January 1944.

==== Combat in Europe ====
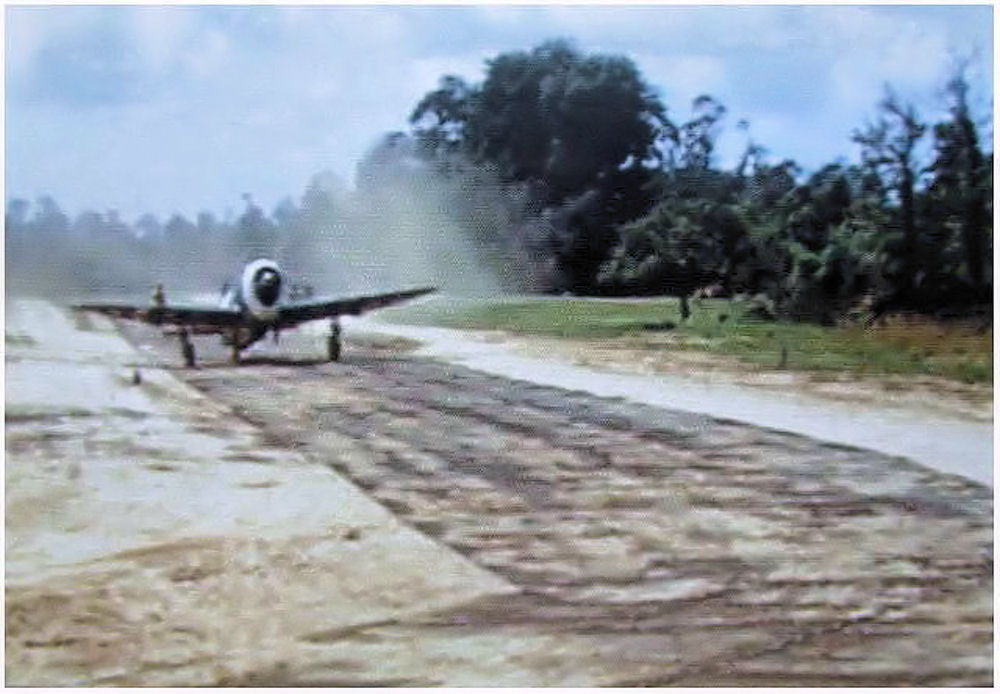
P-47 Taxiing at Cardonville Airfield

The squadron arrived at RAF Greenham Common on 13 January 1944. It began operations on 14 March, when it flew a fighter sweep over the coast of France. That was to be the unit's only mission from Greenham Common, for it moved the next day to RAF Chilbolton, as the 438th Troop Carrier Group moved into Greenham Common. It made strafing and bombing attacks on transportation targets and flak batteries in preparation for Operation Overlord, the invasion of France. The squadron also participated in Operation Crossbow, attacking launch sites for V-1 flying bombs and V-2 rockets. On D-Day, the group supported the landing forces in Normandy.

Two weeks after the landings, it moved to Cardonville Airfield, an advanced landing ground in northern France and began operations from the Continent as an element of IX Tactical Air Command. The squadron provided close air support for forces in the Battle of Cherbourg, which secured a vital port for further operations in France. It participated in the air operations that prepared the way for Operation Cobra, the Allied breakthrough at St Lo on 25 July, and supported ground forces during their drive across France. In early August, the squadron became part of XIX Tactical Air Command, which would concentrate on air support for General George S. Patton's Third United States Army.

By early September, fuel shortages were impacting both Third Army and XIX Tactical Air Command, slowing the Allied advance, and sometimes forcing fighter-bombers to land at forward bases to refuel. On 3 September 1944, operating from Chartres Airfield, and in the face of "withering anti-aircraft and small arms fire," the squadron destroyed numerous motor transport vehicles, horse-drawn vehicles, and uncounted troops in the vicinity of Mons (Bergen), Belgium, also attacking as targets of opportunity enemy positions that obstructed the progress of Allied ground forces. For this action, the squadron was awarded the Distinguished Unit Citation. The squadron then moved closer to the front, arriving at Laon/Athies Airfield on 11 September. It was cited in the order of the day for the first time by the Belgian Army for the period from D-Day through the end of September.

The squadron continued its support of allied ground forces, participated in the assault against the Siegfried Line, and took part in the Battle of the Bulge from December 1944 through January 1945 by attacking rail lines and trains, marshalling yards, roads and vehicles, armored columns, and gun positions. It was cited in the order of the day for a second time by the Belgian Army for this support and awarded the Belgian Fourragère. The squadron continued operations with the Allied forces that pushed across the Rhine and into Germany until the end of the war. The last combat mission flown by the 368th Group was a fighter sweep near Prague on 5 May 1945. The squadron ended the war credited with the destruction of 35 enemy aircraft.

==== Army of occupation ====
After V-E Day, the unit served with the army of occupation, at AAF Station Straubing. On 20 August 1946, the 368th Group and its elements were inactivated and replaced at Straubing by the 78th Fighter Group. The squadron transferred it personnel and equipment to the 82d Fighter Squadron, which was simultaneously activated.

=== Texas Air National Guard ===
The wartime 395th Fighter Squadron was redesignated the 181st Fighter Squadron and allotted to the National Guard the day after it was inactivated in Germany. It was organized at Love Field, Dallas, Texas and was extended federal recognition on 27 February 1947. The squadron was assigned to its World War II headquarters, which had also been assigned to the National Guard as the 136th Fighter Group, and was equipped with North American P-51D Mustangs.

==== Air Defense ====
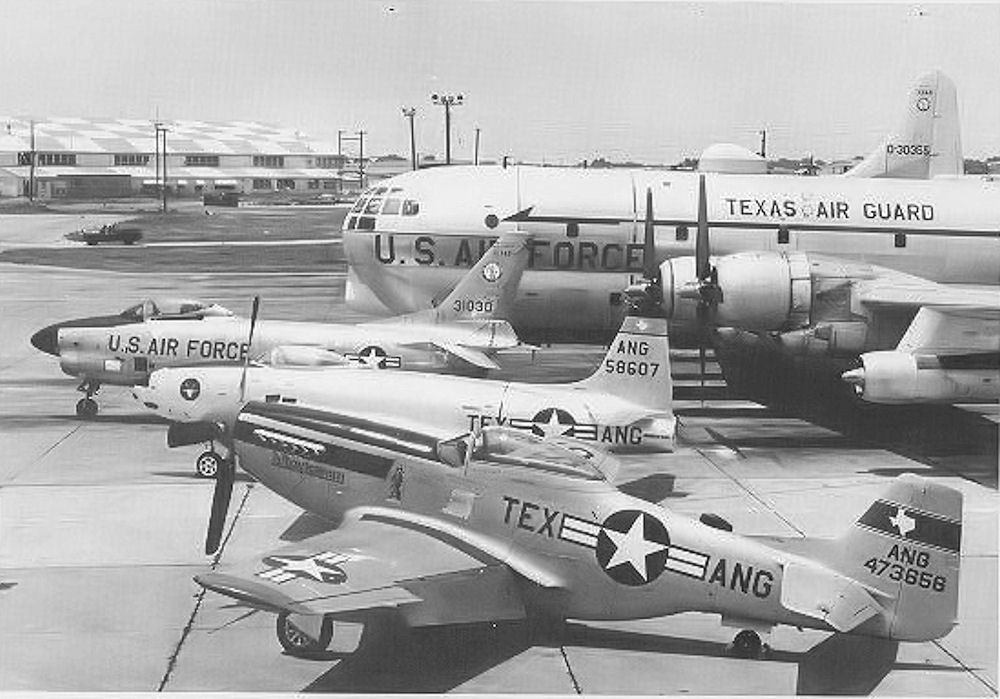
Four generations of Texas Air National Guard aircraft, about 1965

The mission of the squadron was to train for air defense. During the postwar years, the 181st primarily trained over the northern part of the state, while the other two squadrons of the 136th Group, the 111th Fighter Squadron, at Ellington Air Force Base and the 182d Fighter Squadron, at Brooks Air Force Base, near San Antonio, trained in southeastern Texas and the Texas Hill Country.

With the breakout of the Korean War in October 1950, the 136th Fighter Group was one of the first Guard units to be federalized and went on active duty, along with the 111th and 182d Fighter Squadrons and moved to Langley Air Force Base, Virginia. The 181st Fighter Squadron remained in the Texas Air National Guard and was assigned directly to its headquarters. The 181st was re-equipped with the Very Long Range F-51H Mustang, which had been developed to escort Boeing B-29 Superfortress bombers in the Pacific Theater. The F-51H would allow the squadron to intercept any unidentified aircraft over any part of Texas. In September 1952, the squadron became the 181st Fighter-Interceptor Squadron

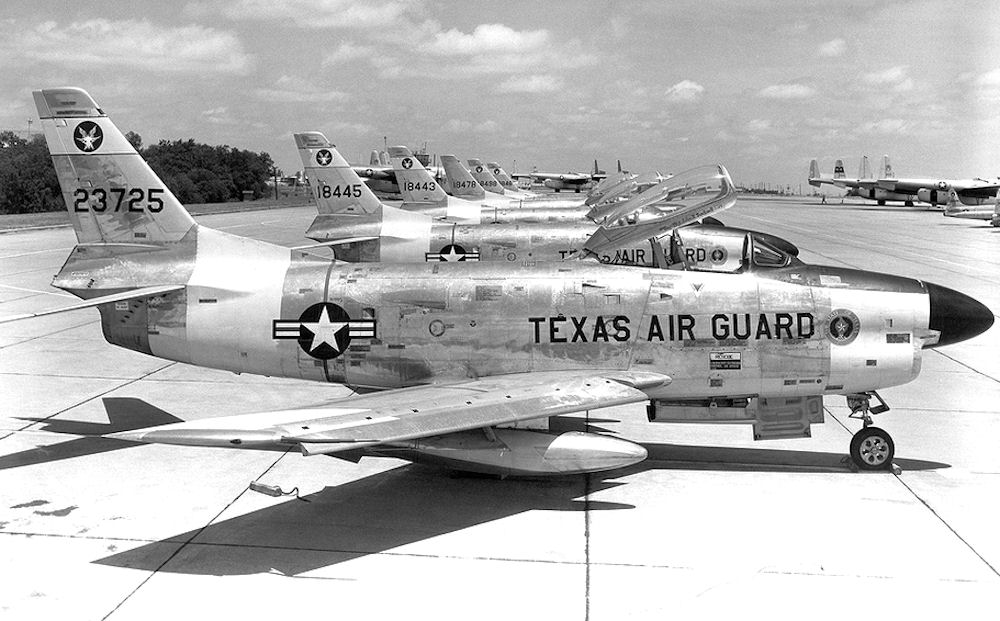
181st FIS F-86D Interceptors, 1958

With the 136th Fighter-Bomber Group's release from active duty in July 1952, the squadron was again assigned to it. It became the 181st Fighter-Bomber Squadron the following January. Despite this name change, the squadron remained focused on the air defense mission.

It wasn't until January 1955 that the squadron received its first jets, Lockheed F-80C Shooting Stars. In July it was redesignated the 181st Fighter-Interceptor Squadron. On 1 July 1957 the 136th Fighter-Interceptor Wing was reorganized along Air Defense Command's (ADC) regional model, becoming the 136th Air Defense Wing, while the 136th Group became the 136th Fighter Group (Air Defense), and new fighter groups were activated for the wing's other squadrons. The 181st was selected by ADC to man an alert program on an around the clock basis, with armed fighters ready to scramble at a moment's notice. This brought the squadron into the daily combat operational program of the Air Force alongside regular air defense fighter squadrons. The squadron's obsolescent F-80 fighters were upgraded to the radar equipped and Mighty Mouse rocket armed North American F-86D Sabre by the end of the year.

==== Air Refueling ====
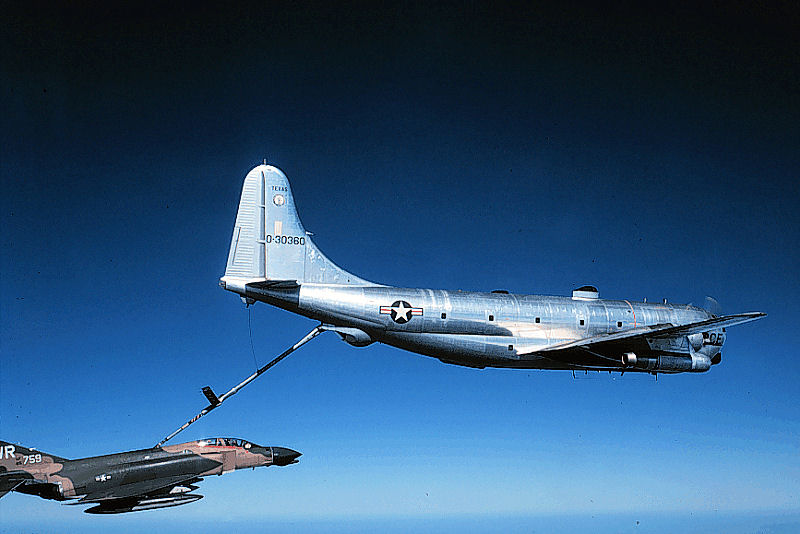
181st Air Refueling Squadron KC-97L

In August 1961, the 181st became the 181st Air Refueling Squadron as Tactical Air Command (TAC) replaced ADC as the unit's mobilization gaining command. The 181st was equipped with Boeing KC-97L Stratotankers, its mission becoming air refueling, primarily of TAC fighter aircraft. The 181st moved from Love Field to Hensley Field, which relieved Love Field from supporting airliners and military aircraft from a field near the downtown area of a major city.

With the transfer of the interceptors and no previously qualified aircrew or maintenance personnel assigned, the 181st went through a year of transition to its new mission. The squadron achieved operational status in the KC-97 in eight months. The previous "normal" time for similar conversions was two years. In 1966 the squadron began a rotational deployment to Ramstein Air Base in support of Operation Creek Party, which provided United States Air Forces Europe an air refueling capability. The Creek Party deployment rotations lasted until 1976, and over the decade the squadron saw millions of pounds of jet fuel off-loaded and millions of miles flown, all accident free. In 1976 the squadron's gaining command became Strategic Air Command, the Air Force's single manager of refueling assets. However, the Air National Guard had begun retiring its KC-97s and by 1978 all had left the inventory.

==== Airlift mission ====
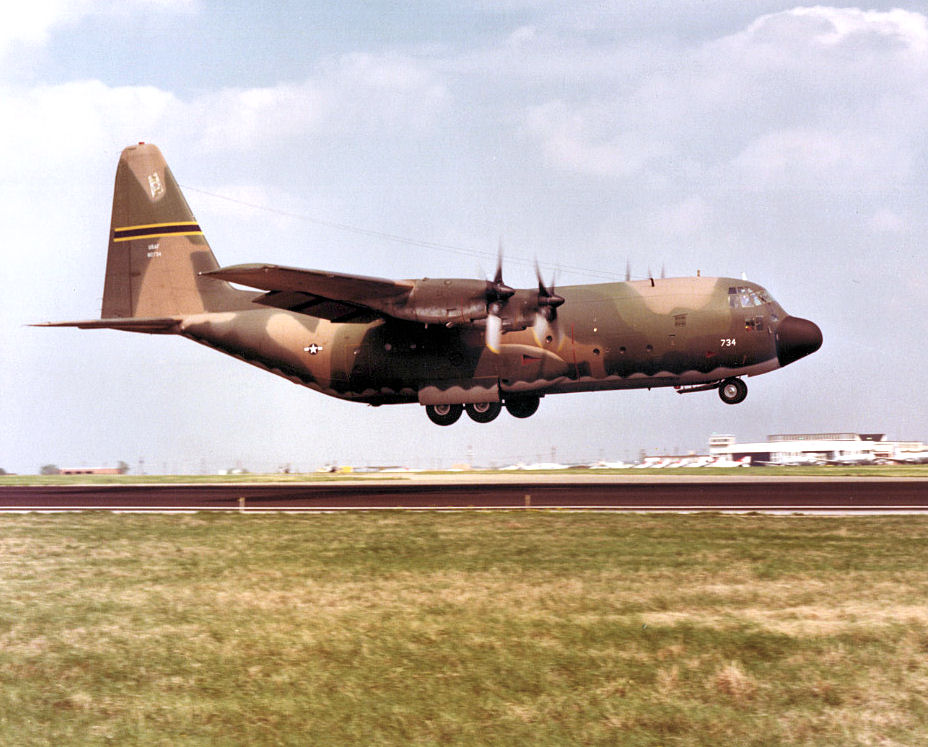
181st TAS C-130B 58-0734 about 1980

On 1 April 1978, the 181st became the 181st Tactical Airlift Squadron and its gaining command became Military Airlift Command (MAC), re-equipping with Lockheed C-130B Hercules transports. The new mission was airlift of troops, military equipment, cargo and aeromedical support.

The squadron participated in numerous Cold War military exercises such as Team Spirit, Volant Oak, Red Flag, and Reforger. Other Joint Chief of Staff exercises included Ember Dawn IV in Alaska and Brave Shield in Europe. In 1979, the Air National Guard and Air Force Reserve assumed full responsibility for airlift operations in Panama.

In mid-December 1989, squadron aircraft, aircrews, and support personnel deployed for Exercise Volant Oak at Howard Air Force Base, in the Panama Canal Zone It flew combat airlift missions for United States Southern Command during Operation Just Cause, the replacement of Manuel Noriega as the ruler of Panama. More than 100 combat sorties were flown, with no casualties or damage to aircraft.

In August 1986 the Wing received the new C-130H aircraft. By late January 1991, the squadron provided voluntarily and involuntarily activated, to participate in Operation Desert Shield and Operation Desert Storm. Aircraft and air crews from the squadron flew two-month-long tours of duty in Operation Volant Pine, a backfill of airlift aircraft to Europe by Air National Guard C-130s.

In 1997, wing members deployed supporting state and federal missions. During the period the unit supported Department of Defense missions deploying to Oman and Saudi Arabia in support of Operation Southern Watch, and in humanitarian airlift. On 1 October 1998 with the closure of Hensley Field, the squadron moved to the former Carswell Air Force Base, now designated as Naval Air Station Joint Reserve Base Fort Worth.

As part of the Global War on Terrorism, the unit has deployed numerous times in support of Operation Noble Eagle, Operation Iraqi Freedom, Operation Enduring Freedom, Operation New Horizons, with an average of six deployments per unit member. When the squadron is the primary force provider for an expeditionary unit, that unit is designated the 181st Expeditionary Airlift Squadron.

== Lineage ==
- Constituted as the 395th Fighter Squadron, Single Engine on 24 May 1943

Activated on 1 June 1943
Inactivated on 20 August 1946

- Redesignated 181st Fighter Squadron, Single Engine and allotted to the National Guard on 21 August 1946

Extended federal recognition on 27 February 1947

- Redesignated 181st Fighter-Interceptor Squadron on 16 September 1952

Redesignated 181st Fighter-Bomber Squadron on 1 January 1953
Redesignated 181st Fighter-Interceptor Squadron on 1 July 1955
Redesignated 181st Air Refueling Squadron, Medium on 1 September 1961
Redesignated 181st Tactical Airlift Squadron on 8 April 1978
Redesignated 181st Airlift Squadron on 16 March 1992

=== Assignments ===
- 368th Fighter Group, 1 Jun 1943 – 20 Aug 1946.
- 136th Fighter Group, 27 January 1947
- Texas Air National Guard, 10 October 1950
- 136th Fighter-Interceptor Group (later 136th Fighter-Bomber Group, 136th Fighter-Interceptor Group, 136th Fighter Group, 136th Air Refueling Group), 10 July 1952
- 136th Air Refueling Wing (later 136th Tactical Airlift Wing, 136th Airlift Wing)), 8 December 1974
- 136th Operations Group, 16 March 1992 – present

=== Stations ===
- Westover Field, Massachusetts, 1 June 1943
- Farmingdale Army Air Field, New York, 23 August – 20 December 1943
- RAF Greenham Common (AAF-486), England, 13 January 1944
- RAF Chilbolton (AAF-404), England, 15 March 1944
- Cardonville Airfield (A-3), France, c. 20 June 1944
- Chartres Airfield (A-40), France, 27 August 1944
- Laon/Athies Airfield (A-69), France, 11 September 1944
- Chièvres Airfield (A-84), Belgium, 2 October 1944
- Juvincourt Airfield (A-68), France, 27 December 1944
- Metz Airfield (Y-34), France, 5 January 1945
- Frankfurt/Rhein-Main Airfield (Y-73), Germany, 15 April 1945
- AAF Station Buchschwabach (R-42), Germany, 13 May 1945
- AAF Station Straubing (R-68), Germany, 13 August 1945 – 20 August 1946
- Love Field, Texas, 27 February 1947
- Hensley Field (later Naval Air Station Dallas), Texas, 1 September 1961
- Naval Air Station Joint Reserve Base Fort Worth, Texas, 1 October 1997 – Present

=== Aircraft ===
- Republic P-47 Thunderbolt, 1943–1946
- North American P-51D (later F-51D) Mustang, 1947–1951
- North American F-51H Mustang, 1951–1955
- Lockheed F-80C Shooting Star, 1955–1957
- North American F-86D Sabre, 1957–1961
- Boeing KC-97L Stratotanker, 1961–1976
- Boeing KC-135A Stratotanker, 1976–1978
- Lockheed C-130B Hercules, 1978–1986
- Lockheed C-130H Hercules, 1986–2021
- Lockheed C-130J Hercules, 2021-
