= 397th Fighter Squadron =

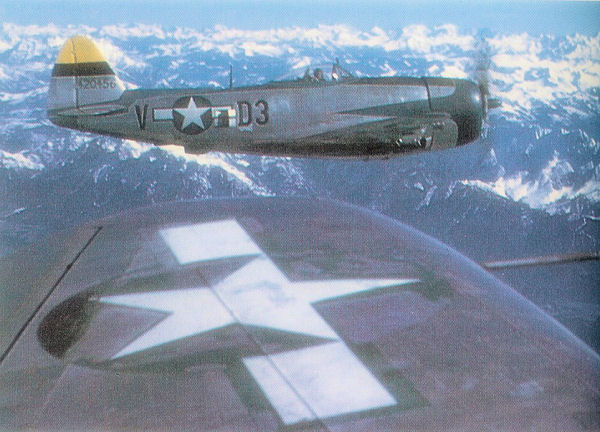
- Squadron P-47D Thunderbolt on an escort mission over the German Alps (Note: Aircraft is Republic P-47D-30-RE Thunderbolt, serial 44-20456.)
- Active: 1943–1946
- Country: United States
- Branch: United States Air Force
- Role: fighter-bomber
- Nickname: Jabo Angels (Note: Jabo is short for Jagdbomber, German for fighter-bomber.)
- Engagements: European Theater of Operations
- Decorations: Distinguished Unit Citation; Belgian Fourragère

Insignia
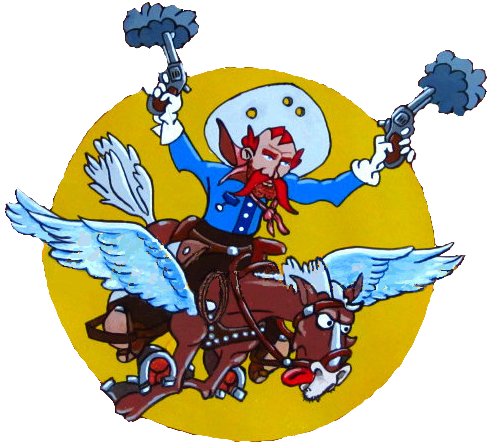
- 397th Fighter Squadron emblem (Note: Approved 13 April 1944.)
- Fuselage identification code: D3

The 397th Fighter Squadron is an inactive United States Air Force unit. It was activated in June 1943 as part of the 368th Fighter Group. After training in the United States, it moved to the European Theater of Operations, where it served in combat until the spring of 1945 with Ninth Air Force, earning a Distinguished Unit Citation and a Belgian Fourragère for its actions. Following V-E Day, the squadron served in the army of occupation at AAF Station Straubing, Germany until it was inactivated on 20 August 1946 and transferred its personnel and equipment to another unit, which was activated in its place.

== History ==
=== Organization and training ===
The 397th Fighter Squadron was first organized at Westover Field, Massachusetts in June 1943 as one of the original squadrons of the 368th Fighter Group. The squadron drew its initial cadre from the 326th Fighter Group, an Operational Training Unit at Westover. In June 1943, the cadre of the squadron travelled to Orlando Army Air Base for training at the Army Air Forces School of Applied Tactics.

The 397th trained with Republic P-47 Thunderbolts, moving to Mitchel Field, New York in August to complete its training. In November, it joined the group headquarters at Farmingdale Army Air Field, New York. The squadron and group left Farmingdale for the Port of Embarkation, Camp Myles Standish on 20 December 1943 and boarded the SS Argentina to sail for Great Britain on 29 December, arriving at the Firth of Clyde on 7 January 1944.

=== Combat in Europe ===
The squadron arrived at RAF Greenham Common on 13 January 1944. It began operations on 14 March, when it flew a fighter sweep over the coast of France. The squadron received its first credit for destroying an enemy aircraft on this mission. That was to be the unit's only mission from Greenham Common, for it moved the next day to RAF Chilbolton, as the 438th Troop Carrier Group moved into Greenham Common. It made strafing and bombing attacks on transportation targets and flak batteries in preparation for Operation Overlord, the invasion of France. The squadron also participated in Operation Crossbow, attacking launch sites for V-1 flying bombs and V-2 rockets. On D-Day, the group supported the landing forces in Normandy.

Ten days after the landings, it moved to Cardonville Airfield, an advanced landing ground in northern France and began operations from the Continent as an element of IX Tactical Air Command. Shortly after the move, Major Randall Hendricks became the squadron's first ace. The squadron provided close air support for forces in the Battle of Cherbourg, which secured a vital port for further operations in France. It participated in the air operations that prepared the way for Operation Cobra, the Allied breakthrough at St Lo on 25 July, and supported ground forces during their drive across France. In early August, the squadron became part of XIX Tactical Air Command, which would concentrate on air support for General George S. Patton's Third United States Army.

By early September, fuel shortages were impacting both Third Army and XIX Tactical Air Command, slowing the Allied advance, and sometimes forcing fighter-bombers to land at forward bases to refuel. On 3 September 1944, operating from Chartres Airfield, and in the face of "withering anti-aircraft and small arms fire," the squadron destroyed numerous motor transport vehicles, horse-drawn vehicles, and uncounted troops in the vicinity of Mons (Bergen), Belgium, also attacking as targets of opportunity enemy positions that obstructed the progress of Allied ground forces. For this action, the squadron was awarded the Distinguished Unit Citation. The squadron then moved closer to the front, arriving at Laon/Athies Airfield on 11 September. It was cited in the order of the day for the first time by the Belgian Army for the period from D-Day through the end of September.

The squadron continued its support of allied ground forces, participated in the assault against the Siegfried Line, and took part in the Battle of the Bulge from December 1944 through January 1945 by attacking rail lines and trains, marshalling yards, roads and vehicles, armored columns, and gun positions. During these operations, on 17 December, Lieutenant William Kerr destroyed three enemy aircraft in a single engagement. (Note: These were Kerr's only victories of the entire war. Newton & Senning, p. 647.) The squadron was cited in the order of the day for a second time by the Belgian Army for this support and awarded the Belgian Fourragère. It continued operations with the Allied forces that pushed across the Rhine and into Germany until the end of the war. The last combat mission flown by the 368th Group was a fighter sweep near Prague on 5 May 1945. The squadron ended the war credited with the destruction of 44 enemy aircraft. (Note: The official total is 43.99 because three pilots who shared in the destruction of a single enemy aircraft received credit for .33 victory each. Newton & Senning, p. 647.)

=== Army of occupation ===
After V-E Day, the unit served with the army of occupation, at AAF Station Straubing. On 20 August 1946, the 368th Group and its elements were inactivated and replaced at Straubing by the 78th Fighter Group. The squadron transferred its personnel and equipment to the 84th Fighter Squadron, which was simultaneously activated. Although 368th Group headquarters and the other two operational squadron of the group were transferred to the National Guard the following day, the 397th has remained inactive.

== Lineage ==
- Constituted as the 397th Fighter Squadron on 24 May 1943

Activated on 1 June 1943
Inactivated on 20 August 1946

=== Assignments ===
- 368th Fighter Group, 1 June 1943 – 20 August 1946

=== Stations ===
- Westover Field, Massachusetts, 1 June 1943
- Mitchel Field, New York, 21 August 1943
- Farmingdale Army Air Field, New York, 29 November – 20 December 1943
- RAF Greenham Common (AAF-486), England, 13 January 1944
- RAF Chilbolton (AAF-404), England, 15 March 1944
- Cardonville Airfield (A-3), France, 16 June 1944
- Chartres Airfield (A-40), France, 23 August 1944
- Laon/Athies Airfield (A-69), France, 11 September 1944
- Chievres Airfield (A-84), Belgium, 2 October 1944
- Juvincourt Airfield (A-68), France, 27 December 1944
- Metz Airfield (Y-34), France, 5 January 1945
- Frankfurt/Rhein-Main Airfield (Y-73), Germany, 16 April 1945
- Buchschwabach Airfield (R-42), Germany, 16 May 1945
- AAF Station Straubing (R-68), Germany, 13 August 1945 – 20 August 1946

=== Aircraft ===
- Republic P-47 Thunderbolt, 1943–1946

=== Awards and campaigns ===
Award streamer	Award	Dates	Notes
	Distinguished Unit Citation Mons, Belgium	3 September 1944	
	Belgian Fourragère	6 June 1944-30 September 1944, 16 December 1944-25 January 1945 (Note: The Belgian Fourragère is awarded to units cited twice in the Order of the Day. These are the two periods for which the squadron was cited.)	

Campaign Streamer	Campaign	Dates	Notes
	Air Offensive, Europe	13 January 1944 – 5 June 1944	
	Air Combat, EAME Theater	13 January 1944 – 11 May 1945	
	Northern France	25 July 1944 – 14 September 1944	
	Rhineland	15 September 1944 – 21 March 1945	
	Ardennes-Alsace	16 December 1944 – 25 January 1945	
	Central Europe	22 March 1944 – 21 May 1945	
	World War II Army of Occupation (Germany)	9 May 1945 – 20 August 1946	
