= 136th Operations Group =

Unit of the Texas Air National Guard

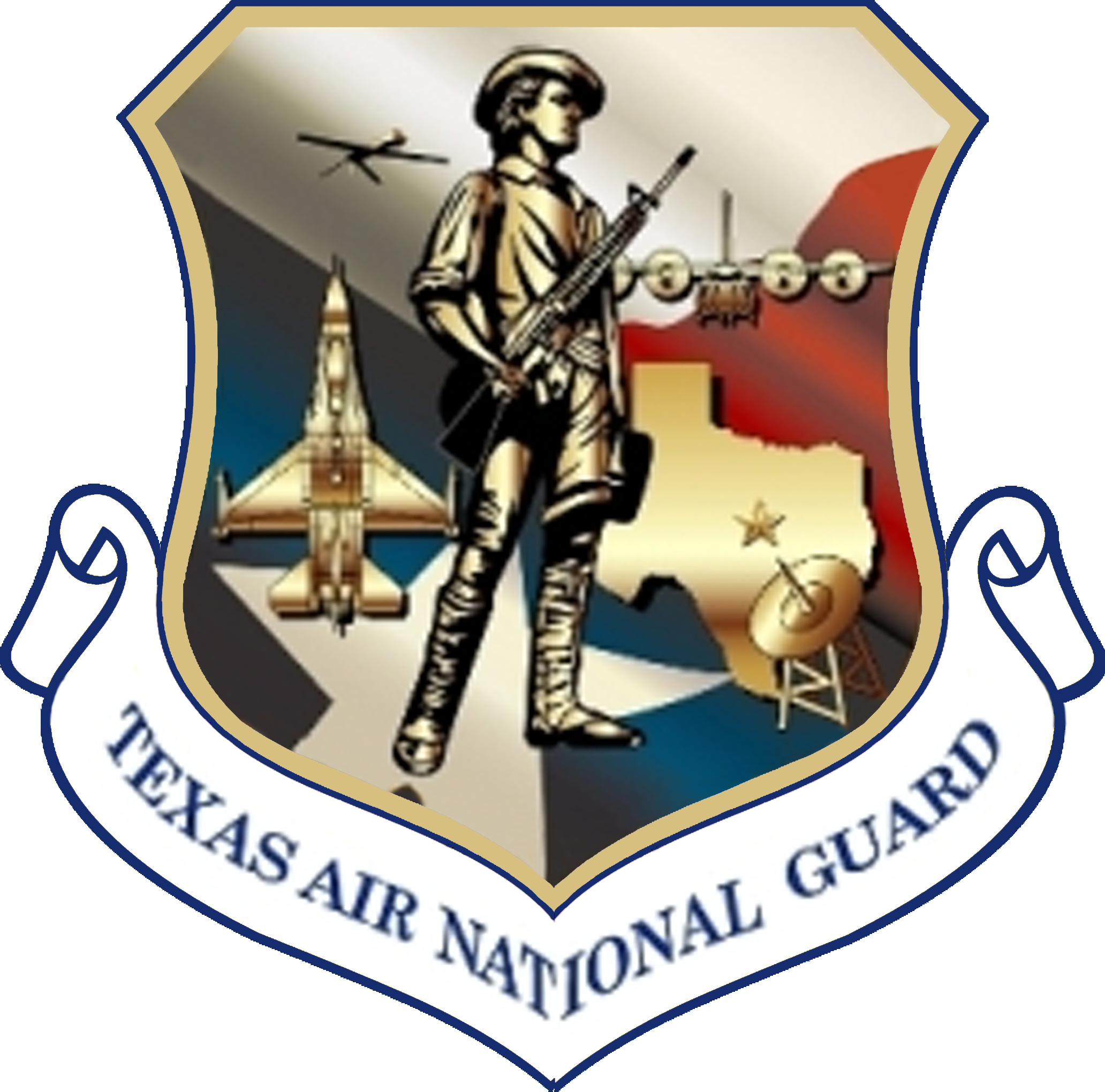
136th Operations Group Texas Air National Guard patch

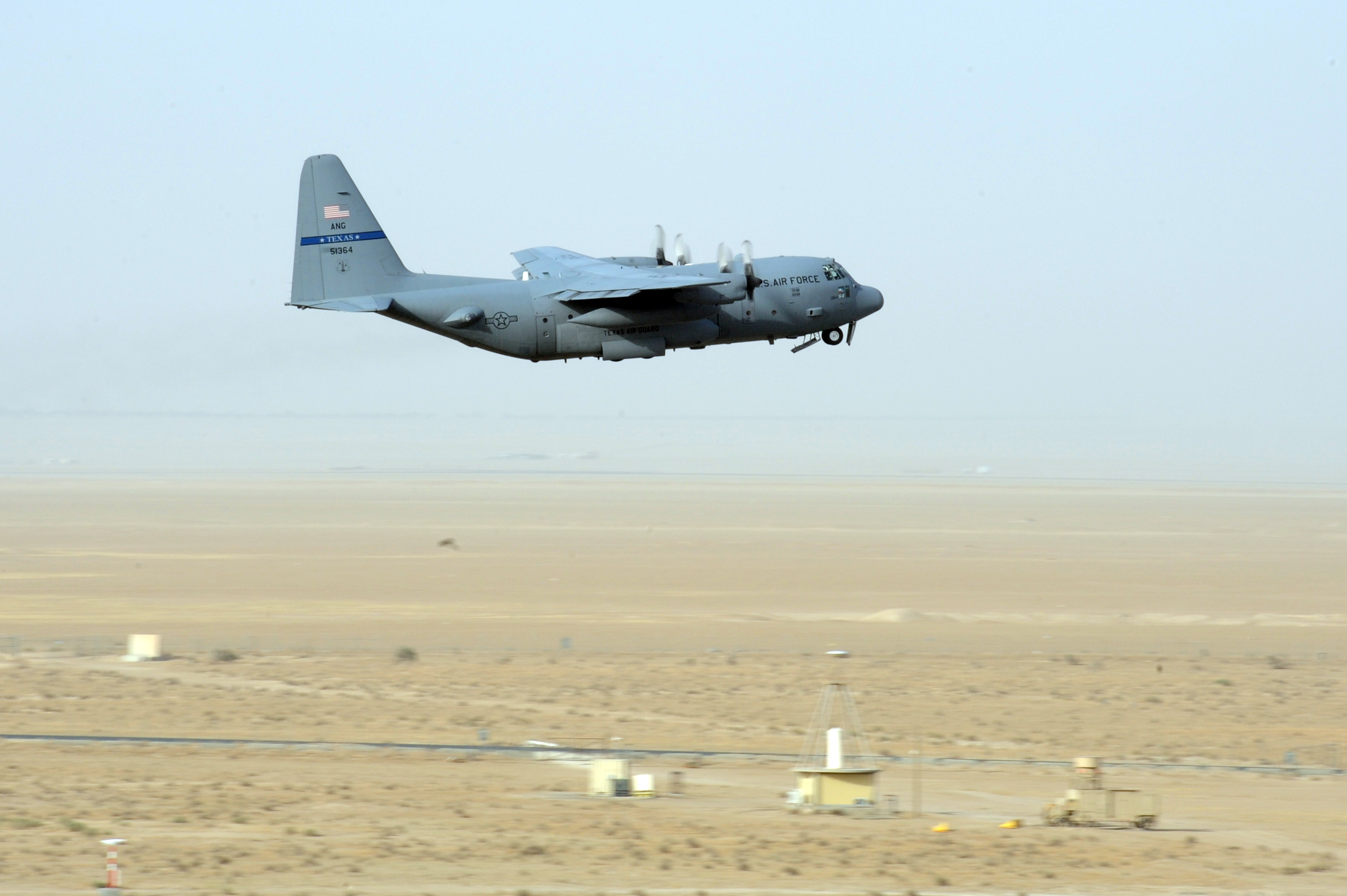
- Group C-130 operating in Southwest Asia
- Active: 1943–1946; 1946–1952; 1952–1974; 1992–present
- Country: United States
- Allegiance: Texas
- Branch: Air National Guard
- Type: Group
- Role: Airlift
- Part of: Texas Air National Guard
- Garrison/HQ: Naval Air Station Joint Reserve Base Fort Worth, Texas
- Motto: Nulli Secundus Latin Second to None
- Engagements: World War II; Korean War
- Decorations: Distinguished Unit Citation; Belgian Fourragère; Air Force Outstanding Unit Award

Insignia
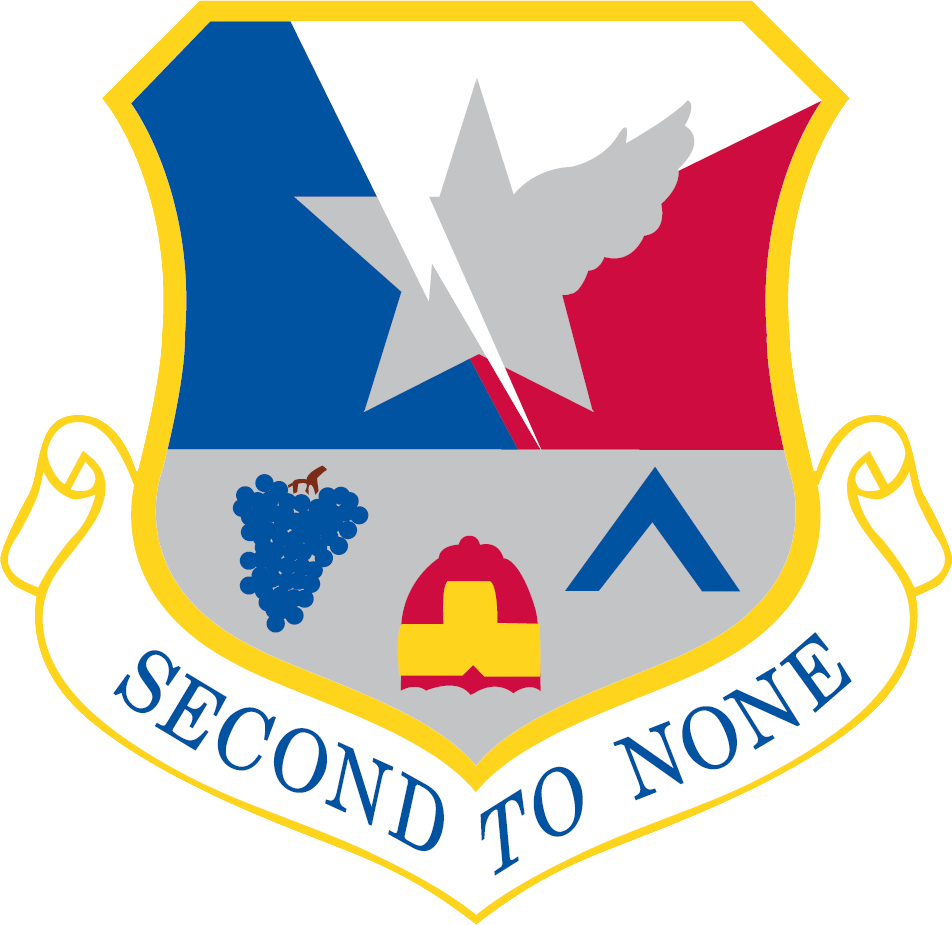
- 136th Operations Group emblem (Note: While assigned to the 136th Wing, the group uses the wing emblem with the group designation on the scroll. AF Instruction 84–105, Organizational Lineage, Honors and History, 27 April 2017, paragraph 3.3.3)
- Tail Stripe: Blue Stripe with "Texas" in white

The 136th Operations Group is a component of the 136th Airlift Wing of the Texas Air National Guard. It was first activated in June 1943 as the 368th Fighter Group. After training with Republic P-47 Thunderbolts in the United States, it deployed to the European Theater of Operations, where it began combat operations in March 1944. Shortly after D-Day, the group moved to the continent of Europe, continuing operations until May 1945. The group was awarded the Distinguished Unit Citation and the Belgian Fourragère for its combat operations and being credited with the destruction of 120 enemy aircraft in air to air combat. It served in the occupation forces until the spring of 1946, when it inactivated and transferred its personnel and equipment to another unit.

The group was redesignated the 136th Fighter Group and activated in the National Guard. It received federal recognition in February 1947 and trained with North American P-51 Mustangs until October 1950, when it was mobilized for the Korean War as the 136th Fighter-Bomber Group. After converting to jet Republic F-84 Thunderjets, it moved to the Pacific, where it entered combat once again. In July 1952, the group was inactivated and once again replaced by another unit.

The group was activated in the Texas Air National Guard the same day it was inactivated in Korea as the 136th Fighter-Interceptor Group. It served in the air defense role under different names and operating different aircraft until 1964, when it converted to Boeing KC-97 Stratofreighters as the 136th Air Refueling Group. In 1974, the group was inactivated along with other Air National Guard groups located on the same bases as their parent wings.

The group was reactivated as the 136th Operations Group in 1992, when the Air National Guard adopted the Objective Wing organization. It has operated the Lockheed C-130 Hercules in the airlift role since then.,

== Mission ==
The group's mission is to provide military forces for worldwide combat and peacetime tasking supporting Texas and the United States. Its flying mission includes short field and dirt strip landing, and airdrop delivery of cargo and personnel in all weather, day and night. As a National Guard unit, the group has a dual role of serving the State of Texas under the command of its Governor during peacetime and state emergencies, and becoming part of the active duty forces under the command of the President of the United States during wartime or other national emergency. Approximately 25% of the group's personnel are full time. The remainder are traditional guardsmen who serve part time.

== Units ==
The 136th Operations Group is assigned two squadrons and one flight.

- 181st Airlift Squadron
- 136th Operations Support Squadron
- 136th Contingency Response Flight

== History ==
=== World War II ===
==== Organization and training ====
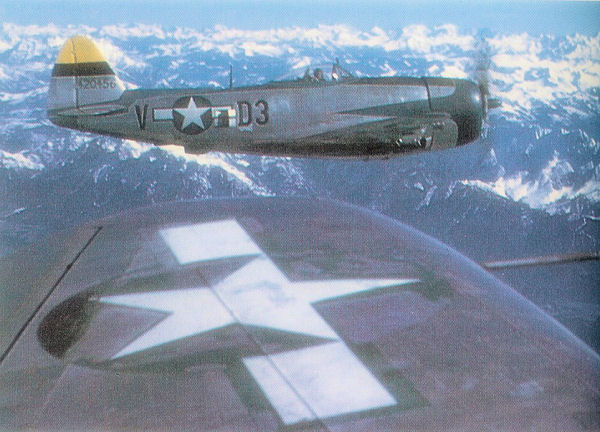
P-47 Thunderbolt of the 397th Fighter Squadron on an escort mission over the German Alps (Note: Aircraft is Republic P-47D-30-RE Thunderbolt, serial 44-20456.)

The group was first organized at Westover Field, Massachusetts on 1 June 1943 as the 368th Fighter Group, with the 395th, 396th, and 397th Fighter Squadrons assigned. The group drew its initial cadre from the 326th Fighter Group, an Operational Training Unit at Westover. In June 1943, the cadres of the group and squadrons travelled to Orlando Army Air Base for training at the Army Air Forces School of Applied Tactics.

The 368th trained with Republic P-47 Thunderbolts, moving to Farmingdale Army Air Field, New York to complete its training. The main body of the group left Farmingdale for the Port of Embarkation, Camp Myles Standish on 20 December 1943, although an advanced echelon had already departed for the European Theater of Operations by air. The group boarded the SS Argentina and sailed for Great Britain on 29 December, arriving at the Firth of Clyde on 7 January 1944.

==== Combat in Europe ====
The group arrived at RAF Greenham Common on 13 January 1944. Although key officers flew missions with the 56th Fighter Group, the group flew its first combat mission, a fighter sweep over the coast of France on 14 March. That was to be the unit's only mission from Greenham Common, for it moved the next day to RAF Chilbolton, as the 438th Troop Carrier Group moved into Greenham Common. The group made strafing and bombing attacks on transportation targets and flak batteries in preparation for Operation Overlord, the invasion of France. The group also participated in Operation Crossbow, attacking launch sites for V-1 flying bombs and V-2 rockets. On D-Day, the group supported the landing forces in Normandy. IX Fighter Command committed that one of its fighter bomber squadrons would be over the beaches from 0600 to 2230. The 368th rotated with the 365th and 366th Fighter Groups to keep this commitment.

Two weeks after the landings, the group moved to Cardonville Airfield in Normandy. It aided in the Battle of Cherbourg, which secured a vital port for further operations in France, and participated in the air operations that prepared the way for Operation Cobra, the Allied breakout at Saint Lo on 25 July, and supported ground forces as they drove across France. In early August, the group became part of XIX Tactical Air Command, which would concentrate on air support for General George S. Patton's Third United States Army.

By early September, fuel shortages were impacting both Third Army and XIX Tactical Air Command, slowing the advance, and sometimes forcing fighter-bombers to land at forward bases to refuel. On 3 September 1944, operating from Chartres Airfield, and in the face of "withering anti-aircraft and small arms fire," the group destroyed 262 motor transport vehicles, 230 horse-drawn vehicles, and uncounted troops in the vicinity of Mons (Bergen), Belgium, dispatching seven missions that day, also attacking as targets of opportunity enemy positions that obstructed the progress of Allied ground forces. For this action, the group was awarded the Distinguished Unit Citation. The group moved closer to the front, arriving at Laon/Athies Airfield on 11 September. It was cited in the order of the day for the first time by the Belgian Army for the period from D-Day through the end of September.

As the Allied forces advanced, the group continued to support ground forces, participated in the assault against the Siegfried Line. In response to a request from the 2nd Armored Division the group, joined by the 363d Fighter Group bombed tank traps and "dragon's teeth" that were barring the division's advance through these defenses. It took part in the Battle of the Bulge from late December 1944 to January 1945 by attacking rail lines and trains, marshalling yards, roads and vehicles, armored columns, and gun positions, operating with the Allied forces that pushed across the Rhine and into Germany. It was cited in the order of the day for a second time by the Belgian Army for this support and awarded the Belgian Fourragère. The group's last combat mission, a fighter sweep near Prague, was flown on 7 May.

Two group pilots, Lt Col Paul P. Douglas, Jr. and Maj Randall W. Hendricks became flying aces with more than five enemy aircraft destroyed. Two of the group's victories were jet powered Messerschmitt Me 262s, both on 16 April 1945. The group's total credit for air to air victories was:

368th Fighter Group

Aerial Victories	Call Sign	Fuselage Code	Number	Note
Group Hq			1
395th Fighter Squadron		A7	35
396th Fighter Squadron		C2	40
397th Fighter Squadron		D3	44
Group Total			120

==== Occupation duty ====
After V-E Day, the group served with the occupation forces in Bavaria. During the period following V-J Day, most experienced personnel became eligible for return to the United States. Although officer strength remained close to authorization, the majority of enlisted personnel left for discharge and were replaced by others who were not yet eligible for return. Most of the group's aircraft were placed in storage due to a lack of ground crew. (Note: However, during the occupation, the group did acquire a number of aircraft not usually assigned to a fighter unit. The historical report for September 1945 includes Douglas C-47 Skytrain, Piper L-4 Cub, Stinson L-5 Sentinel, North American AT-6 Texan, Cessna UC-78 Bobcat, Bücker Bü 181 Bestmann, and Martin B-26 Marauder aircraft, although most of these aircraft had zero or few flying hours.) Many routine tasks were performed by labor unis composed of prisoners of war and displaced persons The group was inactivated at AAF Station Straubing on 20 August 1946, and its personnel and equipment were transferred to the 78th Fighter Group, which was simultaneously activated.

=== Texas National Guard ===
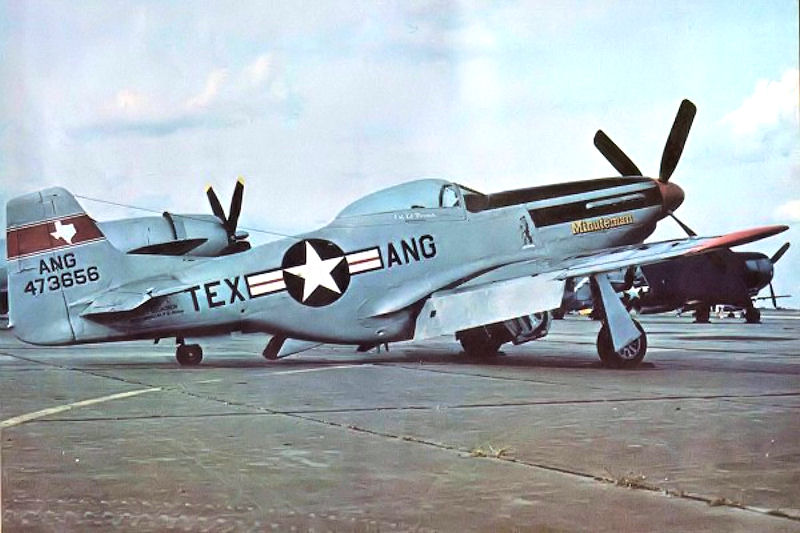
111th Fighter Squadron F-51D (Note: Aircraft is North American F-51D-25-NA Mustang serial 44-73656.)

The following day, the group was redesignated the 136th Fighter Group and allotted to the National Guard. It was activated in December at Hensley Field, Texas and received federal recognition in late February 1947. Its components were two of its former squadrons, the 395th (now the 181st Fighter Squadron) and the 396th (now the 182nd Fighter Squadron), plus the 111th Fighter Squadron, which had first joined the Texas Guard in 1923 and had served during World War II as a reconnaissance unit. Each squadron was located near one of Texas's largest cities, with the 111th at Ellington Field (later Ellington Air Force Base) near Houston, the 181st at Love Field in Dallas, and the 182nd at Brooks Field (later Brooks Air Force Base) in San Antonio. For a brief period, while waiting for the activation of a bombardment group, the 122d Bombardment Squadron of the Louisiana National Guard was also assigned to the group.

The squadrons were equipped with North American P-51D Mustangs and each was supported by a detachment of the 236th Air Service Group.

=== Korean War activation ===
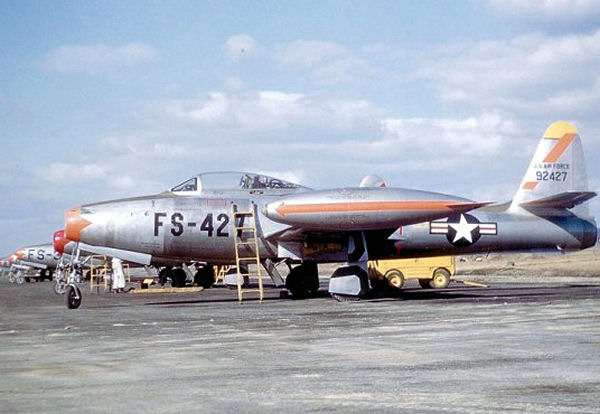
Group F-84E in Korea (Note: Aircraft is Republic F-84E-15-RE Thunderjet, serial 49-2427.)

With the need for additional forces in the Korean War, the 136th Group was one of the earliest Air National Guard units to be mobilized, being called to active duty on 10 October 1950. The group was redesignated the 136th Fighter-Bomber Group, and along with two of its squadrons, moved to Langley Air Force Base, Virginia. Because the Air National Guard had not adopted the wing base organization system of the regular Air Force, the group was temporarily attached to a provisional wing: the 136th Fighter-Bomber Wing, Provisional. Not all of the group's squadrons were called to active duty. Although the 111th and 182d Squadrons joined the group at Langley, the 181st, which was converting to jet fighters at the time the group was mobilized, remained in inactive status and was replaced by the 154th Fighter-Bomber Squadron of the Arkansas Air National Guard. On 26 October, the Air Force activated the 136th Fighter-Bomber Wing as the headquarters for the group and its support organizations.

At Langley, the 136th initially trained with their F-51D Mustangs. In February 1951, the F-51s were replaced by Republic F-84E Thunderjets, and the squadron began transition training on the jet fighter-bomber. In May 1951, the group deployed to Itazuke Air Force Base, Japan. The 136th trained with, then replaced the 27th Fighter-Escort Wing, which returned to the United States at the end of June. At Itazuke, the squadrons took over the F-84Es of the 27th, which remained in place, its aircraft being reassigned from Strategic Air Command to Far East Air Forces.

From Japan the group engaged in combat operations over Korea. On 26 June, in one of the largest air-to-air battles in Korea, two 182d Squadron pilots, Captain Harry Underwood and 1st Lt Arthur Olighter shot down an enemy MiG-15 that broke through the North American F-86 Sabre escort of four B-29s. This was the first combat victory in the Korean War by an Air National Guard pilot. Because the F-84 had limited combat time over Korea when operating from Japan, on 16 November 1951 the group moved to Taegu Air Force Base in South Korea. In 1952, the 136th was re-equipped with the F-84G model of the Thunderjet, designed for close air support of ground forces.

During its time in combat, the 136th flew 15,515 sorties; was credited with 4 enemy aircraft destroyed; 7 probables and 72 others damaged. It dropped 23,749 (7,120 tons) of bombs and expended over 3 million rounds of .50 caliber ammunition. The group was inactivated on 10 July 1952, transferring its mission, personnel and equipment to the 58th Fighter-Bomber Group, which was simultaneously activated at Taegu.

=== Return to the National Guard ===
==== Air defense ====
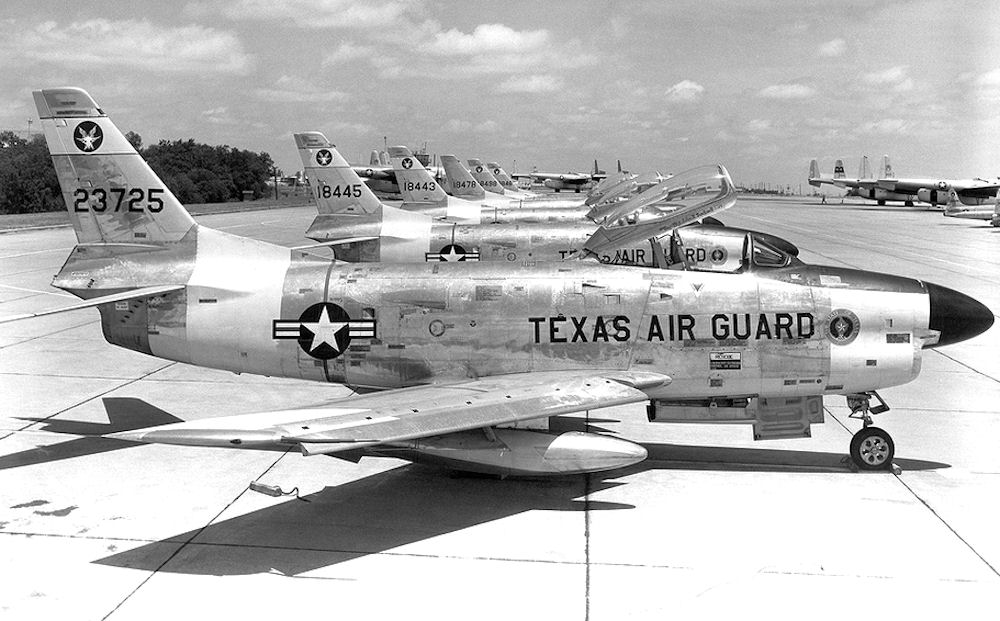
181st Fighter-Interceptor Squadron F-86Ds (Note: Taken at Hensley Field in 1958. Aircraft include North American F-86D-40-NA Sabre serial 52-3725 and North American F-86D-35-NA Sabres, serials 51-8445, 51–8443 and 51-8478)

The group was activated the same day in the Texas Air National Guard as the 136th Fighter-Interceptor Group with the 111th, 181st and 182nd Squadrons once again assigned. Return to the Guard also meant a return to propeller-driven aircraft, this time North American F-51H Mustangs. Although from January 1953 to July 1955, the units were designated fighter-bomber units, their mission remained air defense.

1955 saw not only a return to the interceptor designation, but a return to jet aircraft, albeit the obsolescent Lockheed F-80 Shooting Star. The F-80 was to be a transition aircraft, for in 1957 North American F-86D Sabres equipped with aircraft interception radar and armed with FFAR rockets arrived. The late 1950s also saw the adoption of the regular Air Force model for interceptor units, with the wing becoming the 136th Air Defense Wing, and each fighter squadron joining with support units into a fighter group. On 17 May 1958, the 111th Squadron at Ellington Air Force Base was reassigned to the new 147th Fighter Group (Air Defense) and on 1 July 1960, the 182nd Squadron at San Antonio Airport was reassigned to the new 149th Fighter Group (Air Defense). Only the 181st Squadron remained assigned to the group, now named the 136th Fighter Group (Air Defense). However, the group added support units for the first time, with an air base squadron, materiel squadron and USAF dispensary being assigned with the change in name. In July 1960, ADC began upgrading the 111th, 122d and 182d FIS to the Mach-2 Convair F-102A Delta Dagger interceptor equipped with data link for communication in the Semi-Automatic Ground Environment and armed with GAR-1 Falcon missiles.

==== Air refueling ====
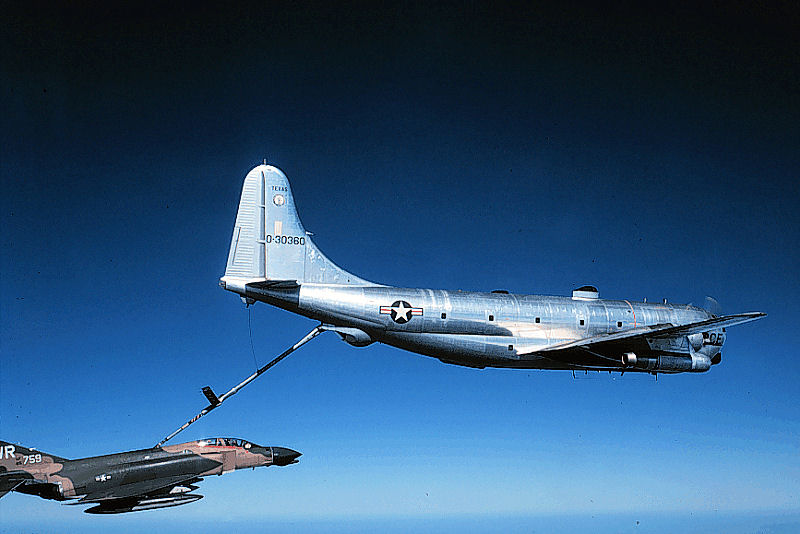
181st Air Refueling Squadron KC-97L Stratofreighter (Note: Aircraft is Boeing KC-97L Stratofreighter, serial 53–360, refueling an 81st Tactical Fighter Wing McDonnell F-4E Phantom II circa 1975. This KC-97 is now in the collection of the Malmstrom Museum at Malmstrom Air Force Base, displayed as KC-97, serial 52-2638.)

The 136th Group and its 181st Squadron were realigned to an air refueling mission, becoming the 136th Air Refueling Group and 181st Air Refueling Squadron. The group was equipped with Boeing KC-97L Stratofreighters, its primary mission becoming the air refueling of tactical fighter aircraft. Also, the 181st was moved from Dallas Love Field to Hensley Field, which ended a debate about the Texas Air National Guard operating from the expanding civilian airport. In 1966 the Unit began a rotational deployment to Ramstein Air Base, Germany in support of Operation Creek Party. which provided United States Air Forces in Europe an air refueling capability.

In 1974, Air National Guard flying groups located on the same station as their parent wings were deemed redundant, and the group was inactivated on 9 December 1974 and its squadron assigned directly to the wing's headquarters.

==== Tactical airlift ====
In March 1992, the Air National Guard implemented the Objective Wing organization. As a result, the group was redesignated the 136th Operations Group and activated to control the operational elements of the 136th Wing, operating the Lockheed C-130 Hercules.

In 1997, group members deployed supporting state and federal missions. During the period the unit supported Department of Defense missions, deploying to Oman and Saudi Arabia in support of Operation Southern Watch. Peacetime humanitarian airlift was also among the missions accomplished by the group.

On 1 October 1998, with the Base Realignment and Closure Commission directed closure of Naval Air Station Dallas, the 136th moved to the former Carswell Air Force Base, now named Naval Air Station Joint Reserve Base Fort Worth/Carswell Field. At this installation, the 136th was collocated with an existing Air Force Reserve Command fighter wing and the Naval Reserve and Marine Corps Reserve aviation units and Army Reserve aviation and ground units that had also relocated there.

As part of the Global War on Terrorism, the 136th has deployed personnel and aircraft numerous times in support of Operation Noble Eagle, Operation Iraqi Freedom, Operation Enduring Freedom, Operation New Horizons, an average of six deployments per unit member.

== Lineage ==
- Constituted as the 368th Fighter Group on 24 May 1943

Activated on 1 June 1943
Inactivated on 20 August 1946

- Redesignated 136th Fighter Group and allotted to the National Guard on 21 August 1946

Activated on 26 December 1946
Extended federal recognition on 27 January 1947
Ordered into active service on 10 October 1950
Redesignated 136th Fighter-Bomber Group on 26 October 1950
Inactivated, released from active duty and returned to state control on 10 July 1952
Redesignated 136th Fighter-Interceptor Group and activated on 10 July 1952
Redesignated 136th Fighter-Bomber Group on 1 January 1953
Redesignated 136th Fighter-Interceptor Group on 1 July 1955
Redesignated 136th Fighter Group (Air Defense) on 1 July 1957
Redesignated 136th Air Refueling Group, on 1 October 1964
Inactivated on 9 December 1974
Redesignated 136th Operations Group
Activated on 16 March 1992

=== Assignments ===
- New York Air Defense Wing (later New York Fighter Wing) 1 June 1943 – 20 December 1943
- IX Fighter Command, 13 January 1944
- 71st Fighter Wing, March 1944
- 100th Fighter Wing, 1 August 1944
- XII Tactical Air Command, August 1945 – 20 August 1946
- Texas Air National Guard, 26 December 1946
- 63d Fighter Wing, 23 May 1948
- Ninth Air Force, 10 October 1950 (attached to 136th Fighter-Bomber Wing, Provisional)
- 136th Fighter-Bomber Wing, 26 October 1950 – 10 July 1952
- 136th Fighter-Interceptor Wing (later 136th Fighter-Bomber Wing, 136th Fighter-Interceptor Wing, 136th Air Defense Wing, 136th Air Refueling Wing), 10 July 1952 – 9 December 1974
- 136th Airlift Wing, 16 March 1992–present

Mobilization gaining commands
Air Defense Command
Tactical Air Command, 1 September 1961
Strategic Air Command, 1 July 1976
Air Mobility Command, 1 June 1992
Air Combat Command, 1 October 1993
Air Mobility Command, 1 April 1997–present

=== Operational components ===
- 111th Fighter Squadron (later 111th Fighter-Bomber Squadron, 111th Fighter-Interceptor Squadron): 27 January 1947 – 10 July 1952, 10 July 1952 – 17 May 1958
- 122d Bombardment Squadron: 26 December 1946 – c. 20 December 1948
- 154th Fighter-Bomber Squadron: 10 October 1950 – 10 July 1952
- 395th Fighter Squadron (later 181st Fighter Squadron, 181st Fighter-Interceptor Squadron, 181st Fighter-Bomber Squadron, 181st Fighter-Interceptor Squadron, 181st Air Refueling Squadron, 181st Airlift Squadron): 1 June 1943 – 20 August 1946, 27 February 1947 – 10 October 1950, 10 July 1952 – 9 December 1974, 12 March 1992 – present
- 396th Fighter Squadron (later 182d Fighter-Bomber Squadron): 1 June 1943 – 20 August 1946, 6 October 1947 – 10 July 1952, 10 July 1952 – 1 July 1960
- 397th Fighter Squadron: 1 June 1943 – 20 August 1946

=== Stations ===
- Westover Field, Massachusetts, 1 June 1943
- Farmingdale Army Air Field, New York, 23 August – 20 December 1943
- RAF Greenham Common (AAF-486), England, 13 January 1944
- RAF Chilbolton (AAF-404), England, 15 March 1944
- Cardonville Airfield (A-3), France, 20 June 1944
- Chartres Airfield (A-40), France, 23 August 1944
- Laon/Athies Airfield (A-69), France, 11 September 1944
- Chievres Airfield (A-84), Belgium, 2 October 1944
- Juvincourt Airfield (A-68), France, 27 December 1944
- Metz Airfield (Y-34), France, 5 January 1945
- Frankfurt/Rhein-Main Airfield (Y-73), Germany, 15 April 1945
- AAF Station Buchschwabach, Germany (R-42), 13 May 1945
- AAF Station Straubing (R-68), Germany, 13 August 1945 – 20 August 1946
- Hensley Field, Texas, 26 December 1946
- Langley Air Force Base, Virginia, 24 October 1950 – 13 May 1951
- Itazuke Air Base, Japan, 15 May 1951
- Taegu Air Base (K-2), South Korea, 16 November 1951 – 10 July 1952
- Hensley Field (later Naval Air Station Dallas), Texas, 10 July 1952
- Naval Air Station Joint Reserve Base Fort Worth, Texas, 1 October 1998–present

=== Aircraft ===
- Republic P-47 Thunderbolt, 1943–1946
- North American F-51D Mustang, 1947–1951
- Republic F-84B Thunderjet, 1950–1951
- Republic F-84E Thunderjet, 1951–1952
- Republic F-84G Thunderjet, 1952
- North American F-51H Mustangs, 1952–1955
- Lockheed F-80 Shooting Star, 1955–1957
- North American F-86D Sabre, 1957–1960
- Convair F-102A Delta Dagger, 1960–1964
- Boeing KC-97L Stratofreighter, 1964–1974
- Lockheed C-130H Hercules, 1992–2021
- Lockheed C-130J Super Hercules, 2021–present

=== Awards and campaigns ===
Award streamer	Award	Dates	Notes
	Distinguished Unit Citation Mons, Belgium	3 September 1944	
	Belgian Fourragère	6 June 1944-30 September 1944, 16 December 1944-25 January 1945 (Note: The Belgian Fourragère is awarded to units cited twice in the Order of the Day. These are the two periods for which the squadron was cited.)	
	Air Force Outstanding Unit Award	1 Oct 2012 – 30 Sep 2014	

Campaign Streamer	Campaign	Dates	Notes
	Air Offensive, Europe	13 January 1944 – 5 June 1944	
	Air Combat, EAME Theater	13 January 1944 – 11 May 1945	
	Northern France	25 July 1944 – 14 September 1944	
	Rhineland	15 September 1944 – 21 March 1945	
	Ardennes-Alsace	16 December 1944 – 25 January 1945	
	Central Europe	22 March 1944 – 21 May 1945	
	World War II Army of Occupation (Germany)	9 May 1945 – 20 August 1946	
