= 397th =

397th may refer to:

- 397th Bombardment Squadron, inactive United States Air Force unit
- 397th Bombardment Wing, inactive United States Air Force unit, last assigned to the 45th Air Division of Strategic Air Command
- 397th Engineer Battalion (United States), construction battalion of the United States Army based in Eau Claire, Wisconsin
- 397th Fighter Squadron, inactive United States Air Force unit

== See also ==
- 397 (number)
- 397, the year 397 (CCCXCVII) of the Julian calendar
- 397 BC
