= Paul P. Douglas Jr. =

United States Air Force general

Paul Page Douglas Jr
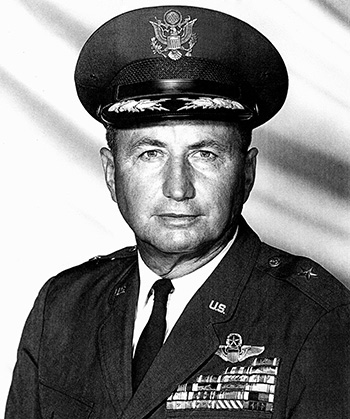
- Born: April 23, 1919; Paragould, Arkansas, U.S.
- Died: December 26, 2002 (aged 83); Bertram, Texas, U.S.
- Burial place: Central Texas State Veterans Cemetery; Killeen, Texas
- Military career
- Allegiance: United States
- Branch: United States Army Air Forces; United States Air Force
- Service years: 1939–1970
- Rank: Brigadier general
- Units: 368th Fighter Group; 388th Tactical Fighter Wing
- Commands: 321st Fighter Squadron; 396th Fighter Squadron; 368th Fighter Group; 36th Fighter Group; 48th Fighter Group; 22d Fighter Squadron; 21st Fighter-Bomber Group; 1400th Operations Group; 474th Tactical Fighter Wing; 41st Air Division; 388th Tactical Fighter Wing; 836th Air Division
- Conflicts: World War II; Vietnam War
- Awards: Distinguished Service Cross (2); Silver Star (3); Legion of Merit (3); Distinguished Flying Cross (3); Purple Heart (2); Air Medal (38)

Paul Page Douglas Jr (April 23, 1919 – December 26, 2002) was a brigadier general in the United States Air Force. During World War II, he flew the P-47 Thunderbolt in the European Theater of Operations and became one of the most highly decorated flying aces of the war. In 1968, he served as the commander of the 388th Tactical Fighter Wing and flew a full tour of bombing and fighter missions over North Vietnam. He retired from the Air Force on 1970.

== Early life ==
Douglas was born in Paragould, Arkansas on 1919, to Bess Douglas and Paul Page Douglas. He graduated from high school in Paragould on 1938 and on the same year, he enrolled at Arkansas State Teachers College. During his studies at ASTC, he also earned his flying license.

== World War II ==
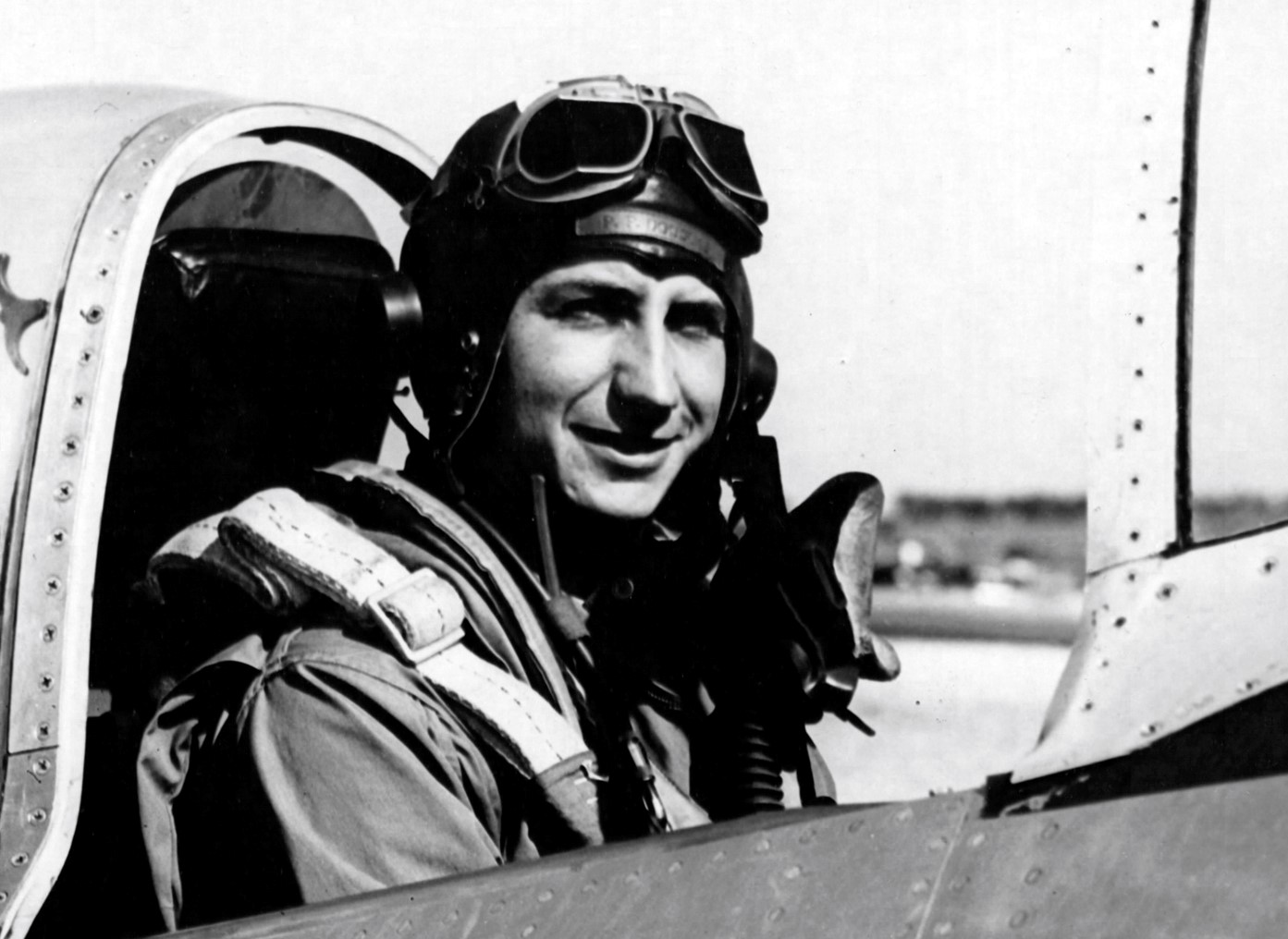
Douglas onboard his P-47 Thunderbolt during World War II (1944)

After the outbreak of World War II in 1939, he joined the Arkansas National Guard and was called to active duty in 1941. He entered the aviation cadet program on April 28, 1941, and received his wings and commission as a second lieutenant at Victoria Field in Texas on December 12, just five days after the Japanese attack on Pearl Harbor.

After serving in numerous fighter units in the United States from December 1941 to June 1943, he was assigned as commander of the 396th Fighter Squadron of the 368th Fighter Group at Farmingdale, New York. In January 1944, the 368th FG was stationed at England.

Flying the P-47 Thunderbolt, Douglas logged a total of 136 missions and 337 combat hours while serving as commander of the 396th Fighter Squadron, vice commander of the 368th Fighter Group and later with the 36th Fighter Group in Belgium, France and Germany. On two occasions, he shot down three enemy aircraft in one flight. He was recommended for the Medal of Honor and twice received the Distinguished Service Cross. In the first ten days of the fall 1944, he led his unit in the interception of German V-1 rockets that were launched toward England. They used P-47’s high-speed dive capability in destroying 494 V-1s. On April 12, 1945, he led 11 P-47s in attacking a German aerodrome in Köthen. During the attack, he destroyed four He 111 bombers, two Ju 88 nightfighters, two Me 410 heavy fighters, two Fw 190s and two training aircraft, while his flight contributed to destruction of 73 other aircraft. For his heroism in the mission, Douglas received a third Silver Star.

Douglas was credited with shooting eight enemy aircraft in the air and destroying 27 enemy planes on the ground during the war. He flew P-47s bearing the name "The Arkansas Traveller".

== United States Air Force career ==
Following the war, he entered Texas Christian University and received his bachelor of science degree in business administration in June 1948. He then returned to his former wartime organization, the 36th Fighter Wing, at Furstenfeldbruck, West Germany, as commander of the 22d Fighter Squadron until December 1949.

He returned to the United States in January 1950 and he served as jet operations officer at Tactical Air Command Headquarters at Langley Air Force Base in Virginia, an instructor in the first class of the Air-Ground Operations School at Ninth Air Force Headquarters at Pope Air Force Base in North Carolina, where he organized the Forward Air Controllers School and the first jump trained FAC School at Pope. He next went to George Air Force Base in California, and served as commander of the 21st Fighter Bomber Group, an F-86 Sabre unit.

From 1954 to 1958, he served as chief of the Fighter Branch, Flight Safety Research Division, 1002d Inspector General Group at Norton Air Force Base, California. In February 1958, he went to the NATO Defense College in Paris. In August 1958, he went to Keflavik, Iceland, as commander of the 1400th Operations Group, Iceland Defense Force, flying the F-89 Scorpion.

In August 1959, he was assigned to Headquarters U.S. Air Force in Washington, D.C., as assistant for Flight Missile and Nuclear Safety in the Office of the Inspector General. He returned to Norton Air Force Base in 1963 as deputy director of Aerospace Safety.

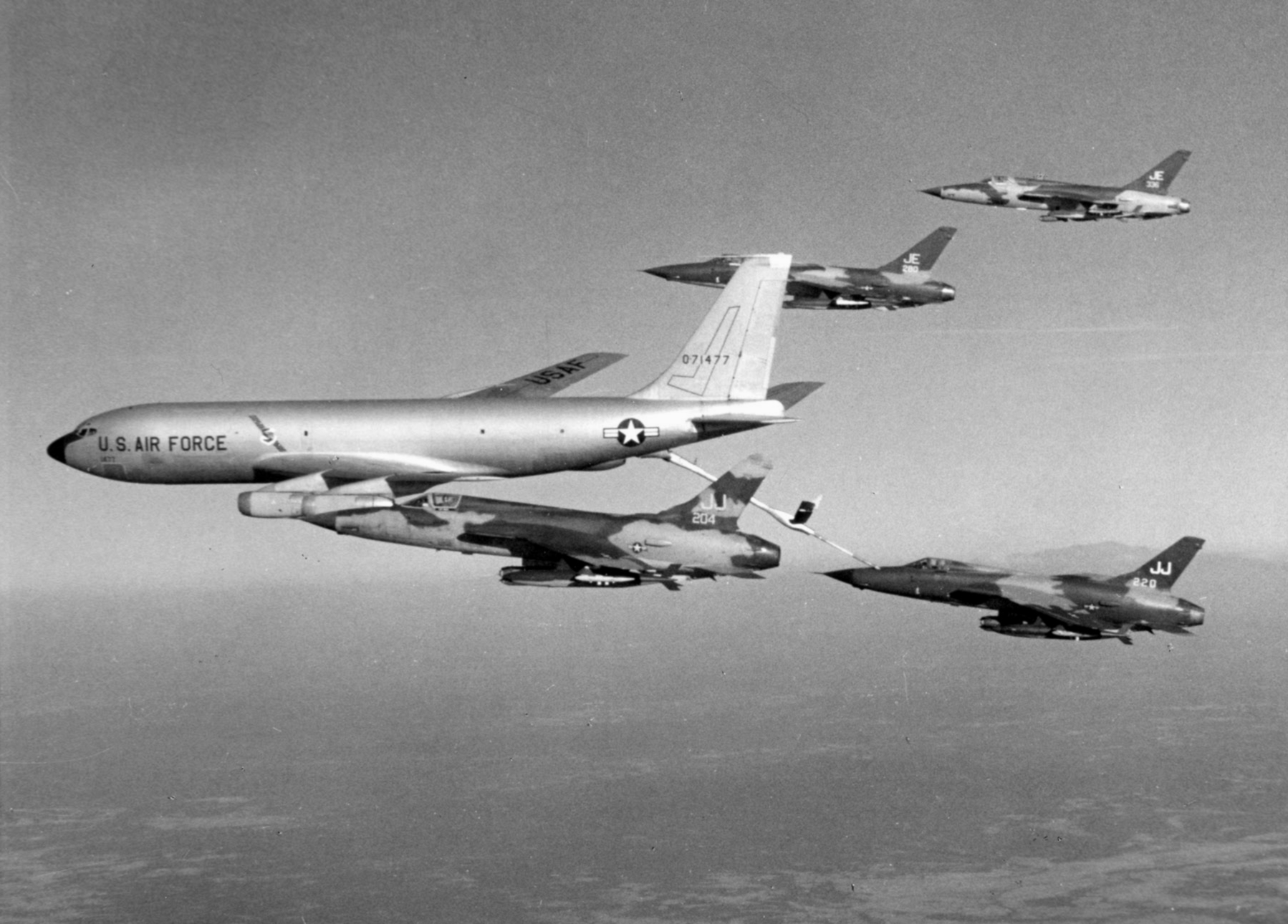
388th TFW F-105s en route to North Vietnam being refueled by KC-135 Stratotanker

Douglas went to Cannon Air Force Base in New Mexico, as director of operations for the Tactical Air Command's 832d Air Division in June 1964 and in September assumed command of the 474th Tactical Fighter Wing there. In July 1965, he was assigned as commander of the 41st Air Division in Yokota Air Base in Japan. He was awarded the Order of the Sacred Treasure (3rd Class) from the Government of Japan, for his efforts as the commander of 41st Air Division at Yokota.

During the Vietnam War, Douglas took the command of 388th Tactical Fighter Wing at Korat Royal Thai Air Force Base in Thailand, after the previous commander, Colonel Neil J. Graham died of a heart attack. During his tour in Vietnam, Douglas flew Republic F-105D Thunderchief 59-1743, which he also named "The Arkansas Traveler".

In February 1969 he was assigned as commander of the 836th Air Division in MacDill Air Force Base in Florida until his retirement from the Air Force on February 1, 1970.

== Later life ==
Douglas married Sarah Lee Chandler on December 23, 1944. They had two daughters and a son.

Following his retirement, he and his wife moved to Conway, Arkansas, where he joined the staff of the University of Central Arkansas. He later worked as the purchasing agent at the university and operated a cattle farm in Faulkner County. In 1983, he acquired ranch property in Bertram, Texas, and built a home and moved his family and cattle rearing there.

Douglas died on December 26, 2002. He was buried at the Central Texas State Veteran's Cemetery in Killeen, Texas.

== Awards and decorations ==
His awards include:

USAF Command Pilot Badge
Distinguished Service Cross with bronze oak leaf cluster
Silver Star with two bronze oak leaf clusters
Legion of Merit with two bronze oak leaf clusters
Distinguished Flying Cross with two bronze oak leaf clusters
Purple Heart with bronze oak leaf cluster
Air Medal with four silver oak leaf clusters
Air Medal with three silver and one bronze oak leaf clusters (second ribbon required for accouterment spacing)
Air Force Commendation Medal with three bronze oak leaf clusters
Army Commendation Medal
Air Force Presidential Unit Citation with two bronze oak leaf clusters
Air Force Outstanding Unit Award with V device and bronze oak leaf cluster
American Defense Service Medal
American Campaign Medal
European-African-Middle Eastern Campaign Medal with three bronze campaign stars
World War II Victory Medal
Army of Occupation Medal with 'Germany' clasp
National Defense Service Medal with service star
Vietnam Service Medal with three bronze campaign stars
Air Force Longevity Service Award with silver and bronze oak leaf clusters
Small Arms Expert Marksmanship Ribbon
British Distinguished Flying Cross
French Croix de Guerre with Etoile de Vermeil
Belgian Fourragère
Japanese Order of the Sacred Treasure (3rd Class)
Vietnam Gallantry Cross Unit Citation
Vietnam Campaign Medal

=== 1st Distinguished Service Cross citation ===

Douglas Jr., Paul P.
Lieutenant Colonel (Air Corps), U.S. Army Air Forces
Date of Action: October 20, 1944

Citation:

The President of the United States of America, authorized by Act of Congress, July 9, 1918, takes pleasure in presenting the Distinguished Service Cross to Lieutenant Colonel (Air Corps) Paul Page Douglas, Jr., United States Army Air Forces, for extraordinary heroism in connection with military operations against an armed enemy while serving as Pilot of a P-47 Fighter Airplane in the 396th Fighter Squadron, 368th Fighter Group, Ninth Air Force, in aerial combat against enemy forces on 20 October 1944, in the European Theater of Operations. On this date, Lieutenant Colonel Douglas was returning to base as leader of a squadron of fighter aircraft with his supply of gasoline almost exhausted, when a formation of more than 20 enemy aircraft carrying bombs was observed. Completely disregarding the odds against him, he ordered all but five of his aircraft to return to base, and with this small number unhesitatingly attacked the enemy formation with such ferocity that they were forced to jettison their bombs directly over the city of Koblenz and take evasive action. In the ensuing combat, Lieutenant Colonel Douglas relentlessly pursued the enemy, destroyed three of his aircraft and damaged a fourth. His own plane was continually under attack and sustained many hits. He was painfully wounded and his airplane's right wing was set on fire, yet he managed to return to base. The extraordinary heroism and zealous devotion to duty displayed by Lieutenant Colonel Douglas on this occasion are in keeping with the highest traditions of the Armed Forces and reflect great credit upon himself, the 9th Air Force, and the United States Army Air Forces.

=== 2nd Distinguished Service Cross citation ===

Douglas Jr., Paul P.
Lieutenant Colonel (Air Corps), U.S. Army Air Forces
Date of Action: March 11, 1945

Citation:

The President of the United States of America, authorized by Act of Congress July 9, 1918, takes pleasure in presenting a Bronze Oak Leaf Cluster in lieu of a Second Award of the Distinguished Service Cross to Lieutenant Colonel (Air Corps) Paul Page Douglas, Jr., United States Army Air Forces, for extraordinary heroism in connection with military operations against an armed enemy while serving as Pilot of a P-47 Fighter Airplane in the 396th Fighter Squadron, 368th Fighter Group, Ninth Air Force, in aerial combat against enemy forces on 14 March 1945. On this date, with only three aircraft supporting him, Colonel Douglas attacked a force of more than fifty enemy aircraft carrying bombs toward the American lines in the Remagen Bridgehead. Completely disregarding the enemy's overwhelming numerical superiority, he attacked relentlessly, compelling the hostile aircraft to jettison their bombs. In the ensuing combat Colonel Douglas destroyed three enemy planes while the aircraft he was leading destroyed seven additional enemy planes with no loss to themselves. The extraordinary heroism and determination of this officer to destroy the enemy are in keeping with the highest traditions of the Armed Forces of the United States.

== Aerial victory credits ==
Date	Credits
22 June 1944	1
23 June 1944	1
20 October 1944	3
14 March 1945	3

SOURCE: Air Force Historical Study 85: USAF Credits for the Destruction of Enemy Aircraft, World War II, Pg.55

== See also ==
- 368th Fighter Group
- 396th Fighter Squadron
- P-47 Thunderbolt
