= 309th Airlift Squadron =

309th Airlift Squadron

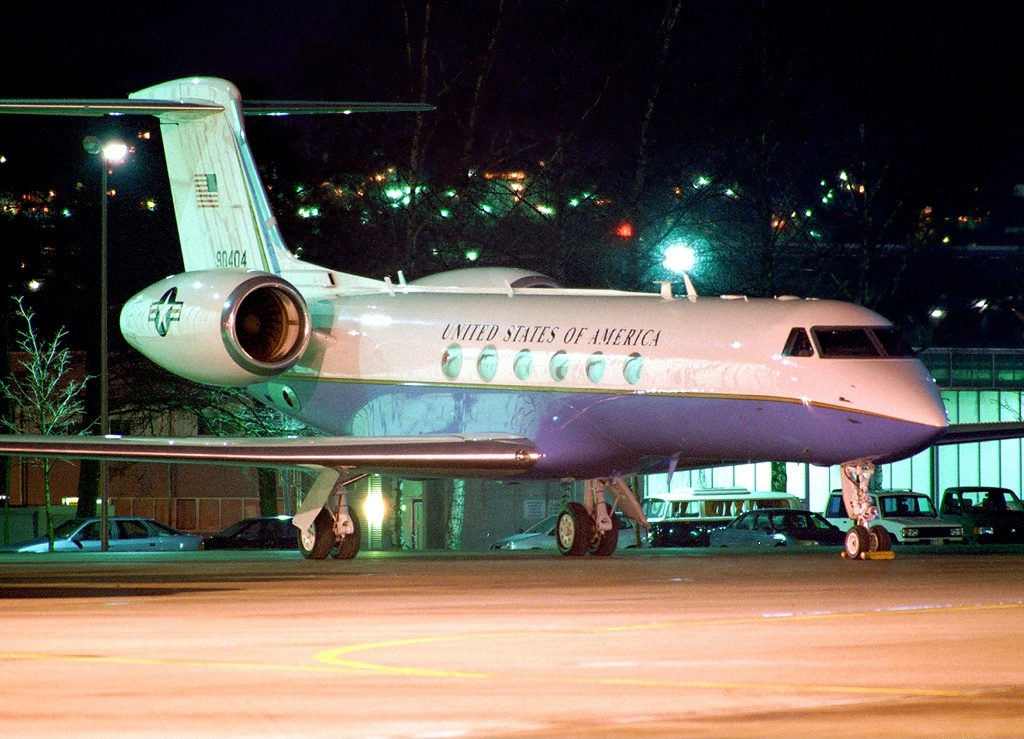
- C-37A Gulfstream V at Stuttgart Airport in 2003
- Active: 1943–1945; 1949–1953; 1954–1956; 1963–1970; 2002–2012
- Country: United States
- Branch: United States Air Force
- Role: Airlift
- Part of: United States Air Forces in Europe – Air Forces Africa: Third Air Force; 86th Airlift Wing; 86th Operations Group
- Last station: Chièvres Air Base, Belgium
- Motto(s): Modus Perfectus (2007–present) (Latin: "The Perfect Way"); Primi Sumus 1966–1970 (Latin: "We are First")
- Engagements: World War II – EAME Theater Vietnam War

- Decorations: Distinguished Unit Citation; Presidential Unit Citation Air Force Outstanding Unit Award with Combat "V" device Air Force Outstanding Unit Award Republic of Vietnam Gallantry Cross with Palm

Insignia
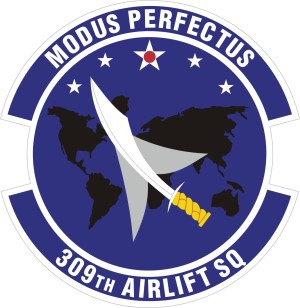
- 309th Airlift Squadron emblem (Note: Approved 21 May 2007.)

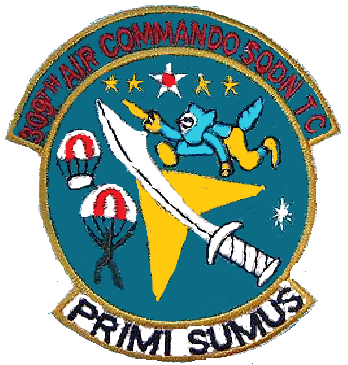
- 309th Air Commando Sq emblem (Note: Approved 14 March 1966.)

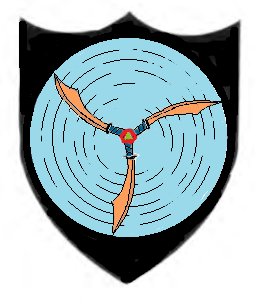
- 309th Troop Carrier Squadron emblem (Note: Approved 1 August 1955.)

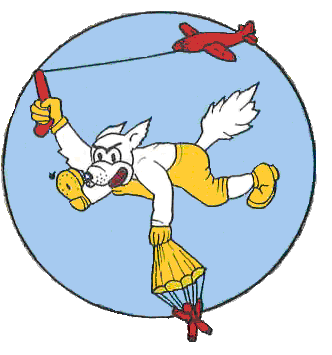
- 309th Troop Carrier Squadron emblem (World War II)

The 309th Airlift Squadron is an inactive United States Air Force unit, last based at Chièvres Air Base, Belgium and assigned to the 86th Airlift Wing at Ramstein Air Base, Germany. It operated a single C-37 aircraft providing executive airlift for NATO.

== History ==
=== World War II ===
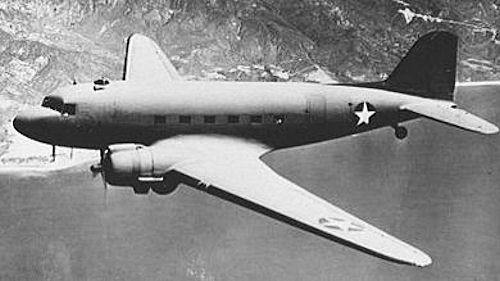
443d Troop Carrier Group C-47

Established in early 1942 as a Douglas C-47 Skytrain transport squadron under First Air Force, later trained under I Troop Carrier Command in the eastern United States. Deployed to England in December 1942, being assigned to VIII Air Support Command, Eighth Air Force to provide transport and resupply support to the buildup of the heavy bomber force in England.

Was detached to Twelfth Air Force in Algeria in May 1943 to provide air resupply and transport during the North African Campaign in Algeria and Tunisia. Also performed combat casualty evacuation of wounded personnel to rear areas. Remained under jurisdiction of VIII ASC while in North Africa, providing transport between England and North Africa from its base in Algeria. Returned to England in early 1944 to participate in the buildup of forces prior to the Allied landings in France during D-Day in June 1944.

Engaged in combat operations by dropping paratroops into Normandy on D-Day (6 June 1944) and releasing gliders with reinforcements on the following day. The unit received a Distinguished Unit Citation and a French citation for these missions.

After the Normandy invasion the squadron ferried supplies in the United Kingdom. The squadron also hauled food, clothing, medicine, gasoline, ordnance equipment, and other supplies to the front lines and evacuated patients to rear zone hospitals. It dropped paratroops near Nijmegen and towed gliders carrying reinforcements during the airborne attack on the Netherlands. In December, it participated in the Battle of the Bulge by releasing gliders with supplies for the 101st Airborne Division near Bastogne.

Moved to Belgium in early 1945, and participated in the Western Allied invasion of Germany, participating in the air assault across the Rhine River in March 1945, each aircraft towed two gliders with troops of the 17th Airborne Division and released them near Wesel.

In late May 1945, after V-E Day, the squadron was moved to Waller Field, Trinidad and attached to Air Transport Command. From Trinidad, the squadron ferried returning military personnel to Morrison Field, Florida, where they were sent on to other bases or prepared for separation after the war. Inactivated at the end of July 1945.

=== Reserve troop carrier ===
Reactivated in 1949 as a reserve troop carrier squadron as part of Tactical Air Command. Equipped with Curtiss C-46 Commandoes. activated during the Korean War and became a training unit for crews flying Fairchild C-119 Flying Boxcar assault transports in South Korea. Inactivated in 1953 after federalized activation period ended. Reactivated a year later operating variety of rotary wing helicopters. Provided helicopter support for atomic weapons tests on Bikini in the Eniwetok Atoll, February–June 1956. Inactivated and replaced by the 21st Helicopter Squadron, which took over its personnel and Piasecki H-21 Workhorse helicopters.

=== Vietnam War ===
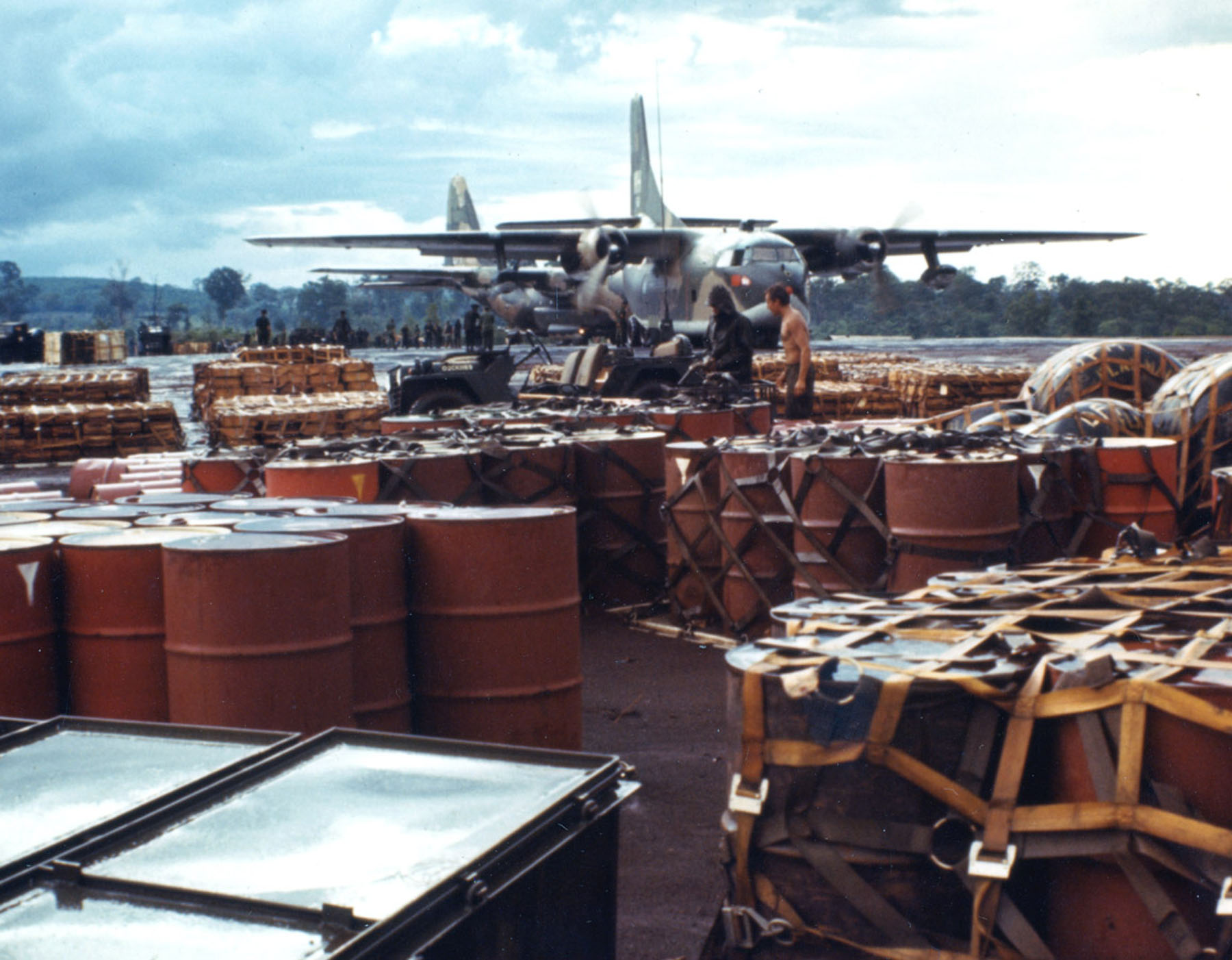
Squadron C-123K during the Cambodian Campaign

Reactivated again in 1963 at Pope AFB as a Fairchild C-123 Provider combat resupply squadron, used in remote combat airfield resupply and casualty evacuation of ground forces. Deployed to South Vietnam after training and operated under 2d Air Division, Pacific Air Forces to support advisory units, primarily in Mule Train combat cargo missions in South Vietnam to support special forces (Air Commandos) in the early stages of US Involvement in the Vietnam War. Re-designated an Air Commando squadron in 1965 under Seventh Air Force, engaged in special operations and tactical airlift during 1965–1970 based at Phan Rang Air Base flying intratheater combat cargo and troop carrier missions. Inactivated as part of the Vietnamization withdrawal process in 1970.

=== Special airlift ===
Reactivated in 2002 as a support transport squadron providing executive airlift support for Supreme Allied Commander Europe (SACEUR), Supreme Headquarters Allied Powers Europe (SHAPE), and Commander United States Air Forces in Europe (COMUSAFE). The 309th Airlift Squadron was inactivated on 5 October 2012. The 424th Air Base Squadron was activated at Chièvres Air Base the next week, on 12 October 2012.

=== Operations and decorations ===
- Combat Operations. Aerial transportation in European Theater of Operations (ETO) of materiel, equipment, and troops, including airborne assaults on Normandy, the Netherlands, and Germany, 6 June 1944 – May 1945. Flew intratheater combat cargo and troop carrier missions in Southeast Asia, 1 July 1963 – 26 June 1970.
- Campaigns. World War II: Normandy; Northern France; Rhineland; Central Europe. Vietnam: Vietnam Advisory; Vietnam Defensive; Vietnam Air; Vietnam Air Offensive; Vietnam Air Offensive, Phase II; Vietnam Air Offensive, Phase III; Vietnam Air/Ground; Vietnam Air Offensive, Phase IV; TET 69/Counteroffensive; Vietnam Summer-Fall; Vietnam Winter-Spring; Sanctuary Counteroffensive.
- Decorations. Distinguished Unit Citations: France [6] Jun 1944. Presidential Unit Citations: Southeast Asia, 21 Jan-12 May 1968; Southeast Asia, 1 Apr-30 Jun 1970. Navy Presidential Unit Citation: Vietnam, 20 Jan-31 Mar 1968. Air Force Outstanding Unit Awards with Combat "V" Device: 1 May 1963 – 30 April 1965; 30 Jun-9 Jul 1965; 15 October 1966 – 30 April 1967; 10 Jun-31 Dec 1967; 15 July 1968 – 30 June 1969; 15 January 2004 – 31 October 2005. Air Force Outstanding Unit Awards: [12 Mar]-31 Dec 2002; 1 November 2005 – 31 December 2006; 1 Jan-31 Dec 2007. Vietnam Gallantry Cross with Palm: 29 June 1966 – 31 July 1970.

== Lineage ==
- Constituted as the 309th Troop Carrier Squadron on 25 May 1943

Activated on 1 October 1943
Inactivated on 31 July 1945

- Redesignated 309th Troop Carrier Squadron, Medium on 10 May 1949

Activated in the reserve on 27 June 1949
Ordered to active service on 1 May 1951
Inactivated on 1 February 1953

- Redesignated 309th Troop Carrier Squadron, Assault, Rotary Wing on 12 August 1954

Activated on 8 October 1954
Inactivated on 9 July 1956

- Redesignated 309th Troop Carrier Squadron, Assault

Activated on 18 March 1963 (not organized)
Organized on 1 April 1963

- Redesignated 309th Air Commando Squadron, Troop Carrier on 8 March 1965
- Redesignated 309th Air Commando Squadron, Tactical Airlift on 1 August 1967
- Redesignated 309th Special Operations Squadron on 1 August 1968
- Redesignated 309th Tactical Airlift Squadron on 1 January 1970

Inactivated on 31 July 1970

- Redesignated 309th Airlift Squadron on 10 February 2002

Activated on 12 March 2002
Inactivated on 5 October 2012

=== Assignments ===
- 443d Troop Carrier Group, 1 October 1943
- I Troop Carrier Command, 15 February 1944
- Eighth Air Force, 21 April 1944
- 315th Troop Carrier Group, 26 April 1944 – 31 July 1945
- 443d Troop Carrier Group, 27 June 1949 – 1 February 1953
- Eighteenth Air Force (attached to 63d Troop Carrier Wing), 8 October 1954 – 9 July 1956
- Tactical Air Command, 18 March 1963 (not organized)
- Ninth Air Force (attached to 464th Troop Carrier Wing), 1 April 1963
- Pacific Air Forces, June 1963
- 315th Troop Carrier Group (later 315th Air Commando Group), 1 July 1963
- 315th Air Commando Wing (later 315th Special Operations Wing, 315th Tactical Airlift Wing), 8 March 1966 – 31 July 1970
- 86th Operations Group, 12 March 2002 – 5 October 2012

=== Stations ===
- Sedalia Army Air Field, Missouri, 1 October 1943
- Alliance Army Air Field, Nebraska, 19 January 1944
- Camp Mackall Army Air Field, North Carolina, 8 March – 21 April 1944
- RAF Spanhoe (AAF-493), England, 21 April 1944
- Amiens Airfield (B-48), France, 6 April – May 1945
- Waller Field, Trinidad, May – 31 July 1945
- Hensley Field, Texas, 27 June 1949
- Donaldson Air Force Base, South Carolina, 9 August 1951 – 1 February 1953
- Donaldson Air Force Base, South Carolina, 8 October 1954 – 9 July 1956
- Pope Air Force Base, North Carolina, 1 April – 1 July 1963
- Tan Son Nhut Airport, South Vietnam, 1 July 1963
- Phan Rang Air Base, South Vietnam, 7 July 1967 – 31 July 1970
- Chièvres Air Base, Belgium, 12 March 2002 – 5 October 2012

=== Aircraft ===
- Aeronca L-3 Grasshopper (1943)
- Douglas C-53 Skytrooper (1943–1944)
- Douglas C-47 Skytrain (1944–1945)
- Consolidated B-24 Liberator (1944–1945)
- Curtiss C-46 Commando (1945, 1951–1952)
- Fairchild C-119 Flying Boxcar (1952–1953)
- Sikorsky H-19 Chickasaw (1954–1956)
- Piasecki H-21 (1956)
- Fairchild C-123 Provider (1963–1970)
- Gulfstream C-37A Gulfstream V (2002–2012)
