= Army Air Forces Station Buchschwabach =

Former US military airfield in Germany

AAF Station Buchschwabach Advanced Landing Ground (ALG) R-42
- AAF Station Buchschwabach (Germany)

Site information
- Type: Military Airfield

Location
- Coordinates: 49°21′55″N 010°53′49″E

Site history
- In use: 1945
- Battles/wars: Western Front (World War II)

Army Air Force Station Buchschwabach is a former military airfield, located 10.1 miles southwest of Nuremberg in Bavaria, Germany.

== History ==
Buchschwabach and its airfield was captured by the United States Army on 21 April 1945 as part of the Western Allied invasion of Germany. It may have been used by the Luftwaffe as an emergency airfield, although no records have been located of a permanent base.

The airfield was repaired by IX Engineering Command, Ninth Air Force into an Army Air Forces advanced Landing Ground, designated R-42. The field had a 5,000 ft grass runway which was also hardened by PHS. IX Air Service Command units used the airfield as a casualty evacuation and combat resupply airfield until the German capitulation on 8 May.

The IX Fighter Command 368th Fighter Group operated P-47 Thunderbolt fighters from the field after the surrender, remaining at the field until 15 August when they moved out. The airfield was dismantled and today some roads can be seen in farmer's fields as single-track access roads.
