= Chièvres Air Base =

NATO airfield in Belgium

Chièvres Air Base
- Chièvres, Hainaut Province, Wallonia in Belgium
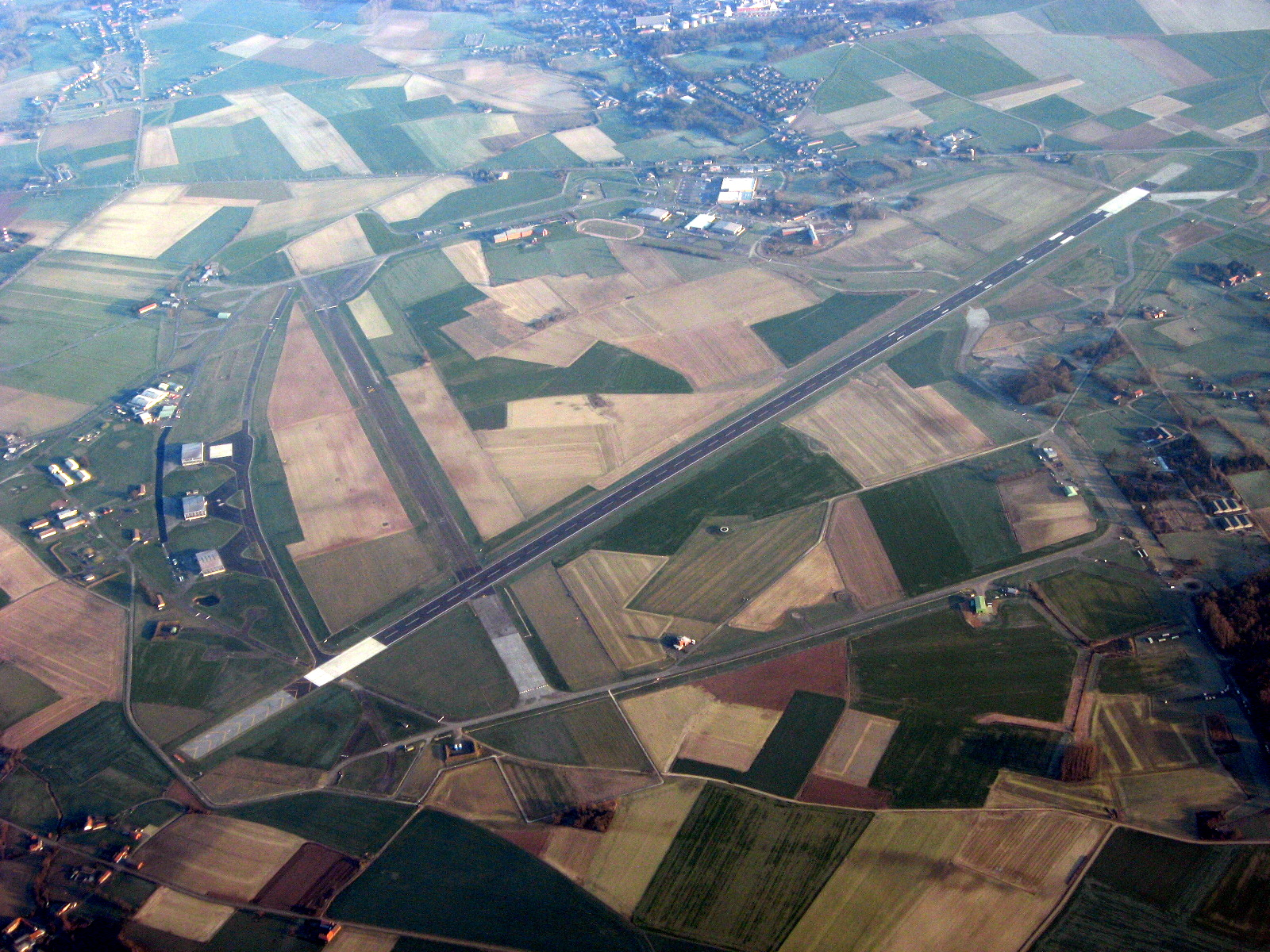
- Aerial view of Chièvres Air Base

Site information
- Type: NATO support airfield
- Operator: United States Air Force
- Controlled by: Supreme Allied Commander Europe (SACEUR)
- Condition: Operational

Location
- Shown in Belgium.
- Coordinates: 50°34′33″N 003°49′52″E

Site history
- Built: 1917
- In use: 1917 – present

Garrison information
- Occupants: 424th Air Base Squadron

Airfield information
- Identifiers: ICAO: EBCV, WMO: 6432
- Elevation: 194 feet (59 m) AMSL
Runways
Direction	Length and surface
08/26	2,500 metres (8,202 ft) Asphalt/Concrete
- Sources: Belgian AIP, DoD FLIP

Chièvres Air Base (ICAO: EBCV), also referred to as SHAPE Airfield at Chievres Air Base, is a NATO airfield operated by the United States Air Force. It is located 2 km (1 mile) east-southeast of the Walloon town of Chièvres in the province of Hainaut, Belgium and about 19 km (12 miles) from Headquarters, Supreme Headquarters Allied Powers Europe (SHAPE), in Casteau. It is mainly used to provide logistic support to NATO and SHAPE. Infrastructure support is provided by the United States Army Garrison Benelux for NATO.

== History ==
The first airfield at Chièvres was established in 1914 by the German Empire during their occupation of Belgium in World War I.

The current airfield was built by the Belgian Army in the 1930s, and at the end of 1939, the Belgian military began converting Chièvres into a diversion airfield. It was captured during the Battle of Belgium by the invading German Wehrmacht in May 1940.

=== German use during World War II ===
Shortly after its capture, the airfield was turned over to the Luftwaffe, and Chièvres became a major air base during the Battle of France. On 2 June, Jagdgeschwader 26 (JG 26) moved Messerschmitt Bf 109E fighters to the airfield and on 9 June Kampfgeschwader 30 (KG 30) moved Junkers Ju 88A attack bombers to the field. Both of these units were heavily engaged in combat operations with the French and the British Expeditionary Force in France.

KG 26 moved into France within a few days, while KG 30 remained at Chièvres until September, taking part in the Battle of Britain. In addition to the Luftwaffe, the Corpo Aereo Italiano stationed Fiat BR.20M Cigogna (43° Stormo) and Cant Z.1007bis bombers (172° Squadriglia Ricognizione Strategica Terrestre) at the base on 27 September, also taking part in the Battle of Britain. The Italians received heavy casualties, and by December 1940 they were recalled to Italy.

By late 1940 Chièvres had been taken off operational status by the Luftwaffe. The Germans found the airfield construction work incomplete, and began rebuilding and expanding the airfield. Construction began and two 1,800 m (5,900 ft) length concrete runways were laid down, extensive taxiways and dispersal pads, and a support facility consisting of maintenance shops, barracks, warehouses and hangars.

The base became operational again in March 1941 when a bomber unit, Kampfgeschwader 3 (KG 3) arrived from Le Culot Airfield (Beauvechain Air Base), with Dornier Do 17 light bombers. From Chièvres KG 3 flew raids against Britain and anti-shipping missions in support of the U-boats during the Battle of the Atlantic campaign. It later transitioned to Junkers Ju 88A attack bombers, and in February 1942 IV.(Erg)./KG 3 assisted the German warships Scharnhorst and Gneisenau in the famous "Channel Dash". In January 1943, it moved to Istres Air Base in Southern France, to attack Allied shipping in the Mediterranean.

Luftwaffe operational units returned to Chièvres during the summer of 1944 when a series of Junkers Ju 88 units, Kampfgeschwader 6 (KG 6); Kampfgeschwader 30 (KG 30), and Kampfgeschwader 76 (KG 76) arrived in June and July. The units attacked targets in England, and later against Allied shipping in the English Channel after the Normandy Invasion of France. The base also served as a diversion field for Luftwaffe fighters.

In August, the base became a base for day interceptors against the American Eighth Air Force bomber fleets attacking targets in Occupied Europe and Nazi Germany. As part of the "Defense of the Reich" campaign, Messerschmitt Bf 109s of Jagdgeschwader 26 (JG 26) attacked the heavy bombers. Later in August, Kampfgeschwader 51 (KG 51) arrived with the Messerschmitt Me 262A jet interceptor for a few days before departing.

Chièvres Air Base was a frequent target of USAAF Ninth Air Force Martin B-26 Marauder medium bombers. The medium bombers would attack in coordinated raids, usually in the mid to late afternoon, with Eighth Air Force heavy bombers returning from attacking their targets in Germany. The attack was timed to have the maximum effect possible to keep the Luftwaffe interceptors pinned down on the ground and be unable to attack the heavy bombers. Also, the Republic P-47 Thunderbolts of Ninth Air Force would be dispatched to perform fighter sweeps over Chièvres after the Marauder raids, then meet up with the heavy bombers and provide fighter escort back to England. As the North American P-51 Mustang groups of Eighth Air Force began accompanying the heavy bombers all the way to their German targets by mid-1944, it was routine for them to also attack Chièvres on their return to England with a fighter sweep and attack any target of opportunity to be found at the airfield.

The Luftwaffe was forced to withdraw from the base by 1 September 1944, leaving the installation heavily damaged.

=== Allied use ===
On September 3, Allied troops arrived and assumed command of the airbase. Once in American hands, combat engineers of the IX Engineering Command 846th Engineer Aviation Regiment repaired the damaged airfield and applied numerous patches to the two concrete runways and taxiways of the field. It was declared operationally ready for combat units on 16 September, only a few days after its capture from German forces, being designated as Advanced Landing Ground A-84 or "Chievres Airfield".

Although operationally usable, Chièvres was a wrecked base from the numerous Allied air attacks and what was blown up by the Germans as they withdrew. The Americans made do with what could be repaired, with the 843d Engineer Aviation Regiment moving in what equipment was necessary to conduct combat operations.

In October 1944, the P-47D Thunderbolts of the USAAF Ninth Air Force 368th Fighter Group and Eighth Air Force P-51 Mustangs of the 361st Fighter Group were stationed at Chièvres. During the Battle of the Bulge the base was also used by the Hawker Typhoons of 123 Wing RAF. In March 1945 the 352d Fighter Group, equipped with P-51D Mustangs, were stationed at the base.

After the German surrender Chièvres became both a transit station for US soldiers returning home and a German POW camp. By the end of 1945 the base was turned over to the Belgian authorities.

=== Cold War years ===
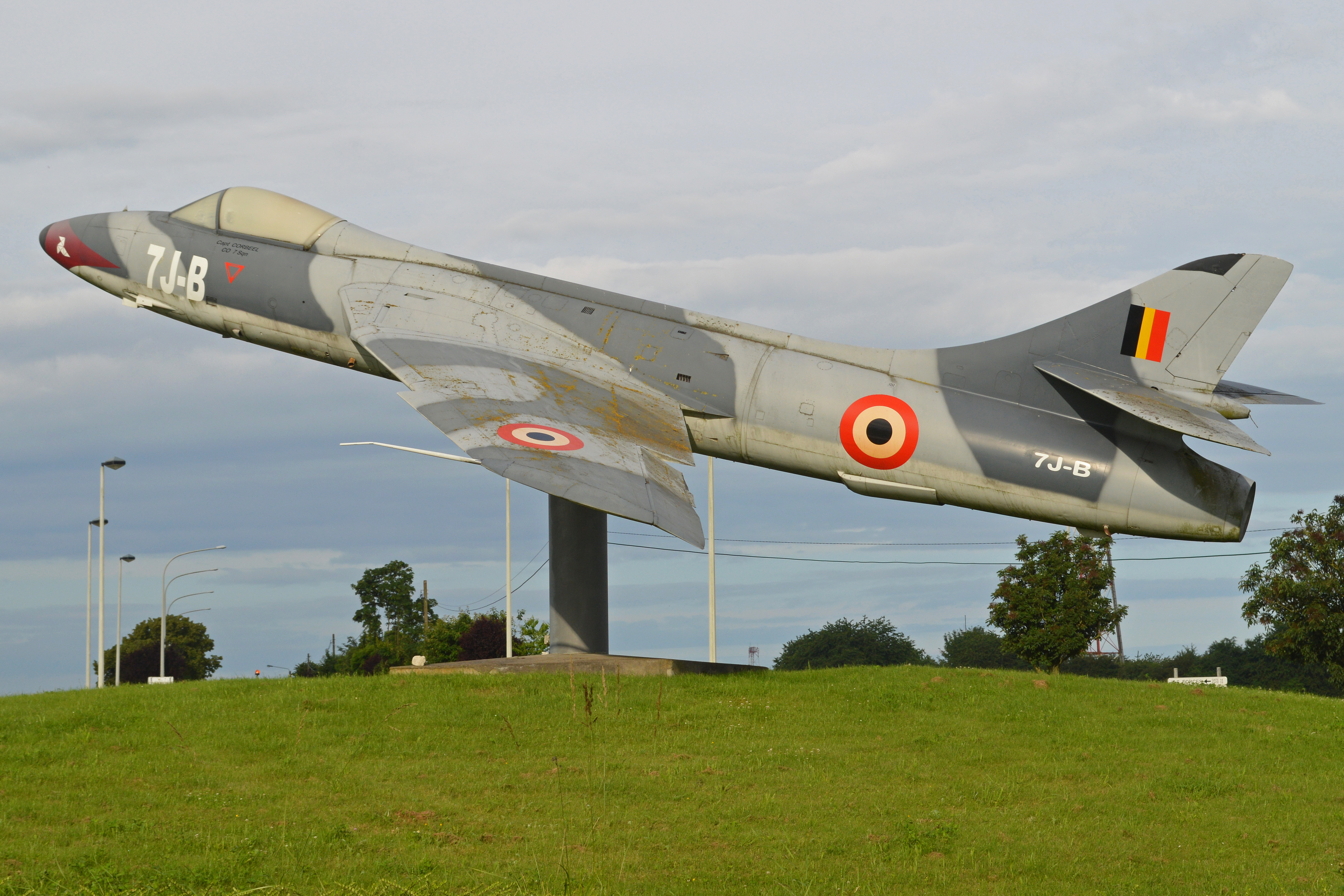
Belgian Air Force Hawker Hunter F.6 ‘7J-B’ (actual serial IF-65) on display on the N56 as it passes Chièvres Air Base

In 1947 the base was rebuilt and expanded to serve as a jet-fighter base. On 1 December 1950 the 7th Fighter Wing, equipped with the Gloster Meteor, was stationed at Chièvres and joined a year later by the 10th Fighter-Bomber Wing operating Spitfire XIV. After converting to the F-84E Thunderjet the 10th Wing left Chièvres in 1953 for Kleine Brogel in Limburg.

In June 1956 the 7th Wing converted to the Hawker Hunter Mk. 4, and two years later to the Hunter F6. In 1963, the 7th Wing was disbanded, and on 31 December 1967 the Belgian authorities officially turned over Chièvres Airbase to the Supreme Headquarters Allied Powers Europe (SHAPE).

The Americans established the NATO/SHAPE Support Group (US) in 1968 at Caserne Daumerie adjacent to the air base and just east of the town of Chièvres to operate the base and provide logistic support to NATO and SHAPE. This small unit was part of Theater Army Support Command (TASCOM), which was part of U.S. Army Europe (USAREUR). The NATO/SHAPE Support Group was later renamed 80th Area Support Group (NATO/SHAPE Support Group).

The air base did serve as rehearsal and arrival point of US Precision Helicopter Team that competed in September France 1989. The US Team would take the first seven places over teams from USSR in overall competition.

=== Post Cold War years ===
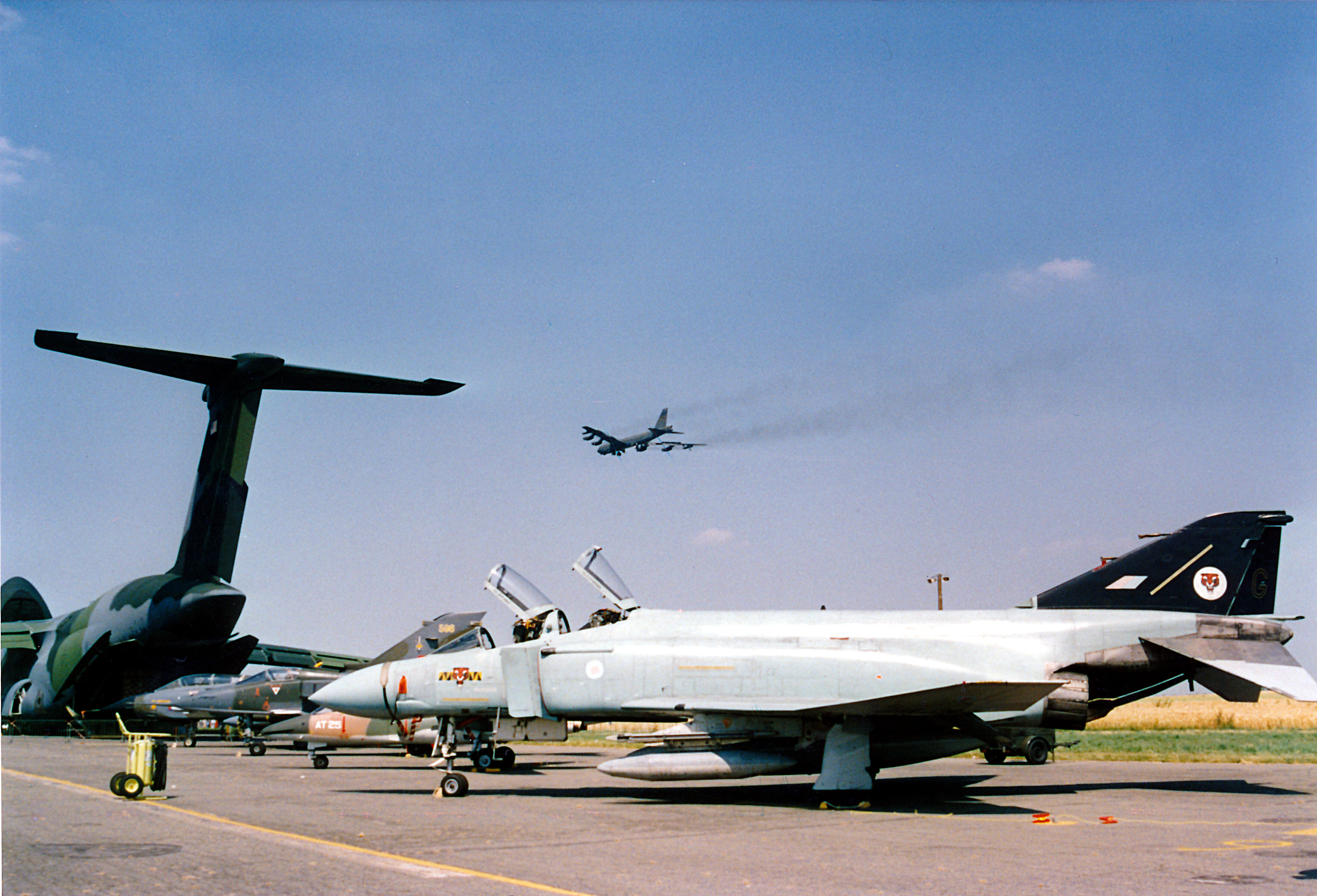
A variety of visiting aircraft including RAF fighters and USAF C-5 and B-52 at the 1987 Chièvres Air Show

The 80th Area Support Group (NATO/SHAPE Support Group) was renamed USAG BENELUX (NATO/SHAPE Support Group) in 2005.

In 2007 construction work started on a 94-room Army lodge. A $17 million commissary at Chièvres opened in 2010. One major project nearing completion is the runway renovation effort which sees the runway lengthened and resurfaced.

309th Airlift Squadron was the last USAF operational flying unit at Chièvres Air Base. It was attached to the 86th Operations Group at Ramstein Air Base, Germany. It primarily operated Gulfstream V aircraft (Designated C-37A) providing executive airlift for senior personnel assigned to SHAPE and NATO headquarters.

== Role and operations ==
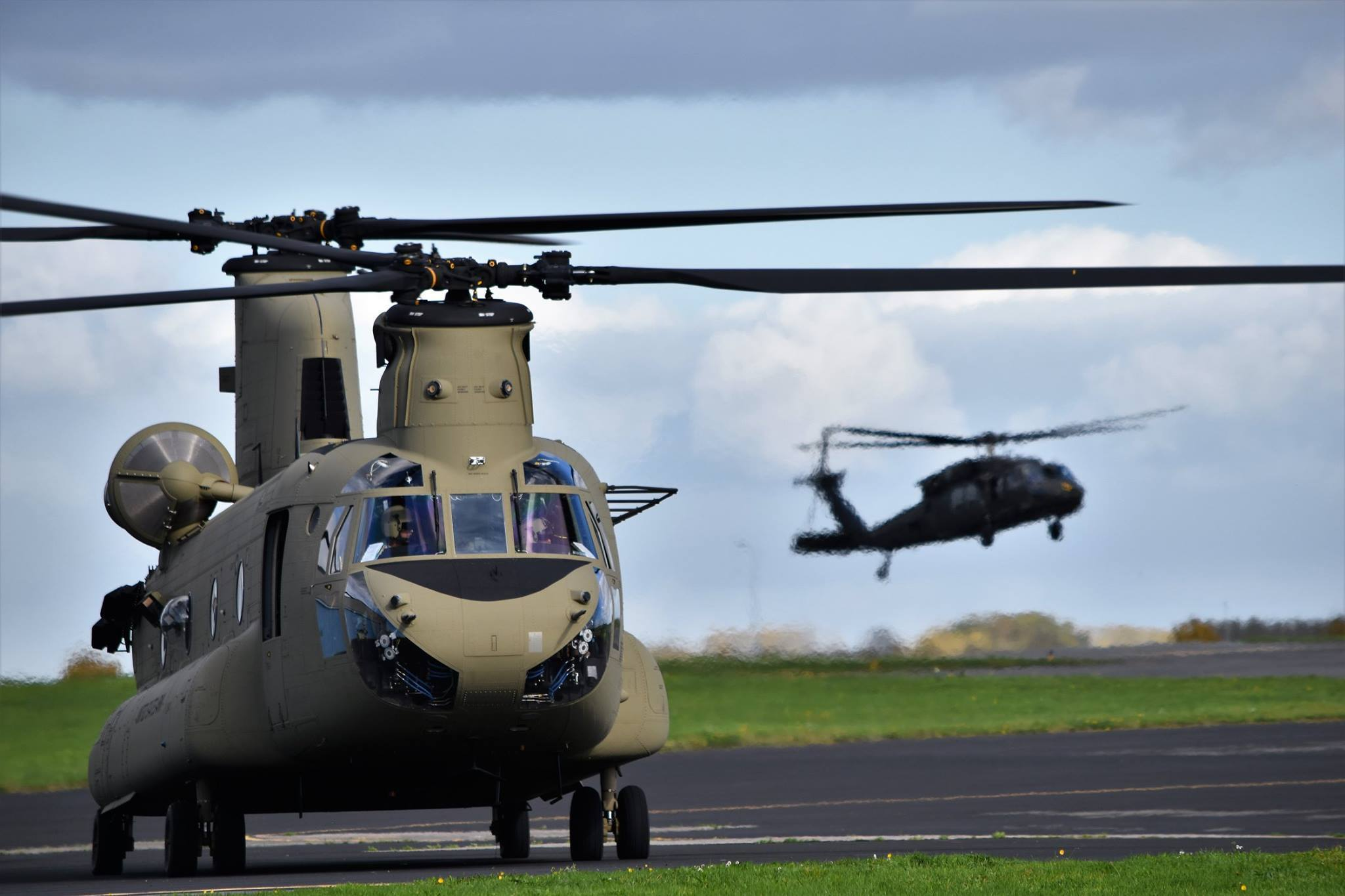
U.S. Army helicopters assigned to the 1st Cavalry Division at Chievres Air Base, Belgium, 2017

The United States Air Force 424th Air Base Squadron (ABS) is the operational unit at Chièvres Air Base. It is supported by the 86th Operations Group at Ramstein Air Base, Germany. It functions as the Senior Airfield Authority for the airfield on behalf of the US. The airfield is considered part of SHAPE as NATO provides the US funding to maintain and operate the airfield. Even though the U.S. Air Force's 424th ABS Squadron operates the airfield and runways, overall airfield maintenance operations and the base operations are entrusted to the USAG BENELUX, a U.S. Army unit. Chievres Air Base is, in the eyes of Supreme Allied Commander Europe (SACEUR) and the Kingdom of Belgium, a SHAPE base and not a US Army base.

USAG Benelux provides base support operations and supports retirees and other personnel assigned to Supreme Headquarters Allied Powers in Europe.

== Based units ==
Flying and notable non-flying units based at Chièvres Air Base.

=== United States Air Force ===
US Air Forces in Europe - Air Forces Africa (USAFE-AFAFRICA)

- Third Air Force
  - 86th Airlift Wing
    - 86th Operations Group
      - 424th Air Base Squadron

=== United States Army ===
US Army Europe (USAREUR)

- US Army Garrison Benelux
  - USAG Benelux Directorate of Emergency Services

== See also ==
- Advanced Landing Ground
