= SS Argentina =

SS Argentina may refer to:

- SS Argentina (1912), launched in 1912 as SS Reina Victoria-Eugenia, renamed Argentina in 1931
- SS Argentina (1913), launched in 1913 as SS Bergensfjord, renamed Argentina in 1947
- SS Argentina (1929), launched in 1929 as SS Pennsylvania, renamed Argentina in 1938
- SS Argentina (1958), launched in 1958 and renamed numerous times
