= 508th Fighter Squadron =

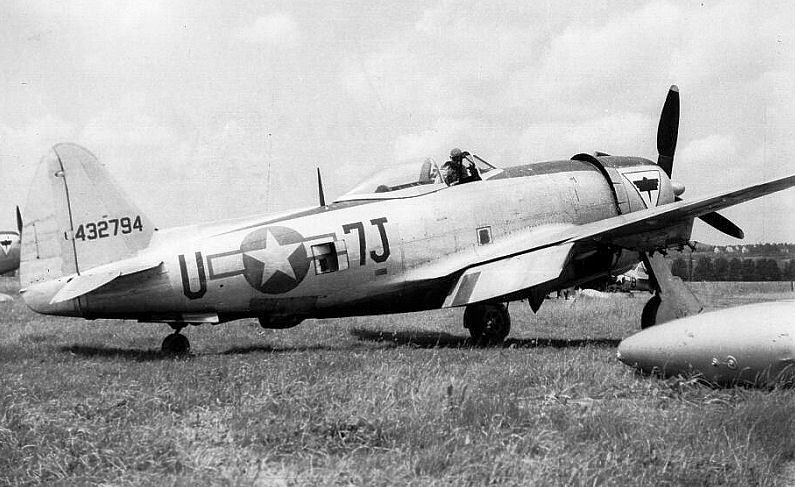
- 508th Fighter Squadron P-47D Thunderbolt (Note: Aircraft is Republic P-47D-30-RA Thunderbolt, serial 44-32794, fuselage code 7J-U)
- Active: 1943–1945
- Country: United States
- Branch: United States Air Force
- Role: Fighter-bomber
- Engagements: European Theater of Operations
- Decorations: Distinguished Unit Citation; French Croix de Guerre with Palm; Belgian Fourragère
- Battle honours: Distinguished Unit Citation French Croix de Guerre with Palm Belgian Fourragère

Insignia
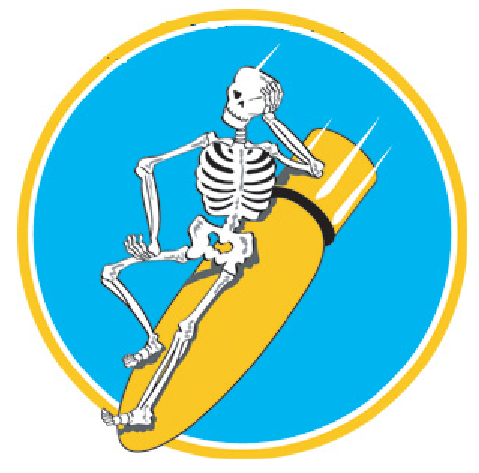
- 508th Fighter Squadron Emblem (Note: Approved 22 June 1943. Description: Over and through a light blue disc, bordure yellow-orange, piped white, a skeleton white, outlined black, reclining on a large red-orange aerial bomb falling to base all emitting white speed lines to rear.)

The 508th Fighter Squadron is an inactive United States Army Air Forces unit. It was last assigned to the 404th Fighter Group at Drew Field, Florida, where it was inactivated on 9 November 1945. The squadron saw combat in the European Theater of Operations with Ninth Air Force as a fighter-bomber unit during World War II. It was decorated by the American, French, and Belgian governments for its actions during the war.

== History ==
The squadron was established as the 622d Bombardment Squadron (Dive) and activated on 4 February 1943 at Key Field, Mississippi as one of the four original squadrons of the 404th Bombardment Group. The squadron trained with Douglas A-24 Banshee (Dauntless) dive bombers and Bell P-39 Airacobra fighters and was redesignated the 508th Fighter-Bomber Squadron in August. After training was completed at Myrtle Beach Army Air Field, South Carolina, the 508th deployed to the European Theater of Operations, where it became part of IX Fighter Command in England and was assigned Republic P-47 Thunderbolts. The squadron became operational on 1 May 1944 and was redesignated as a fighter squadron at the end of the month.

The squadron began operations by bombing and strafing targets in France to prepare for Operation Overlord, the Normandy invasion. It provided top cover for landings in Normandy on 6 and 7 June 1944. On 6 July the squadron moved across the English Channel to its advanced landing ground at Chippelle Airfield, France. It provided close air support for ground troops until the end of the war, The 508th assisted the United States First Army in the breakout at Saint-Lô on 28 through 31 July, when despite severe losses from flak, the squadron and the other squadrons of the 404th group provided cover for four armored divisions. It supported the drive through the Netherlands in September 1944, Allied operations during the Battle of the Bulge from December 1944 to January 1945, and Operation Lumberjack, and helped defend the expansion of Remagen bridgehead on the east side of the Rhine during March 1945.

The squadron also flew air interdiction, strafing and bombing troop concentrations, railroads, highways, bridges, fuel and ammunition dumps, armored vehicles, docks and tunnels. In addition, it flew fighter escort missions, covering operations of Boeing B-17 Flying Fortresses, Consolidated B-24 Liberators and Martin B-26 Marauders.

The squadron received a Distinguished Unit Citation for three armed reconnaissance missions it flew on 10 September 1944. Despite adverse weather and flak, the squadron attacked enemy communications, rolling stock and factories to support advancing ground forces. It was also awarded the Belgian Fourragère after being cited three times in the Belgian Army Order of the Day for operations contributing to the liberation of the Belgian people.

After the surrender of Germany, the squadron became part of the occupying United States forces though the summer of 1945. It aided in disarming the Luftwaffe and dismantling the German aircraft industry. The 508th returned to the United States and was inactivated in early November.

== Lineage ==
- Constituted as the 622d Bombardment Squadron (Dive) on 25 January 1943

Activated on 4 February 1943
Redesignated 508th Fighter-Bomber Squadron on 10 August 1943
Redesignated 508th Fighter Squadron, Single Engine on 30 May 1944
Inactivated on 9 November 1945

=== Assignments ===
- 404th Bombardment Group (later 404th Fighter-Bomber Group, 404th Fighter Group): 5 February 1943 – 9 November 1945

=== Stations ===
- Key Field, Mississippi, 4 February 1943
- Congaree Army Air Field, South Carolina, 5 July 1943
- Burns Army Air Field, Oregon, 8 September 1943
- Myrtle Beach Army Air Field, South Carolina, 13 November 1943 – 13 March 1944
- RAF Winkton, (Station 414) Hampshire, England, 5 April 1944
- Chippelle Airfield, (A-5) France, 6 July 1944
- Brétigny Airfield, (A-48) France, 2 September 1944
- Juvincourt Airfield, (A-68) France, 13 September 1944
- St Trond (Sint Truiden) Airfield, (A-92) Belgium, 1 October 1944
- Kelz Airfield, (Y-54) Germany, 3 April 1945
- Fritzlar Airfield, (Y-86) Germany, 13 April 1945
- Stuttgart-Bernhausen Airfield, Germany, 23 June 1945 – 2 August 1945
- Drew Field, Florida. 11 September 1945 – 9 November 1945

=== Aircraft ===
- Douglas A-24 Banshee, 1943–1944
- Bell P-39 Airacobra, 1943–1944
- Republic P-47 Thunderbolt, 1944–1945

== Awards and campaigns ==
Award streamer	Award	Dates	Notes
	Distinguished Unit Citation	10 September 1944	508th Fighter Squadron
	French Croix de Guerre with Palm	29, 30 and 31 July 1944	508th Fighter Squadron
	Belgian Fourragere	6 June 1944-30 September 1944, 1 October 1944 – 17 December 1944, 18 December 1944 – 15 January 1945	508th Fighter Squadron

Campaign Streamer	Campaign	Dates	Notes
	Air Offensive, Europe	5 April 1944 – 5 June 1944	508th Fighter-Bomber Squadron (later 508th Fighter Squadron)
	Normandy	6 June 1944 – 24 July 1944	508th Fighter Squadron
	Northern France	25 July 1944 – 14 September 1944	508th Fighter Squadron
	Rhineland	15 September 1944 – 21 March 1945	508th Fighter Squadron
	Ardennes-Alsace	16 December 1944 – 25 January 1945	508th Fighter Squadron
	Central Europe	22 March 1944 – 21 May 1945	508th Fighter Squadron
	Air Combat, EAME Theater	5 April 1944 – 11 May 1945	508th Fighter Squadron
	American Theater	5 February 1943 – 13 March 1944	622d Bombardment Squadron (later 508th Fighter-Bomber Squadron)
	World War II Army of Occupation	9 May 1945 – 2 August 1945	508th Fighter Squadron

== See also ==
- Advanced Landing Ground
