= 185th Special Operations Squadron =

Oklahoma Air National Guard unit

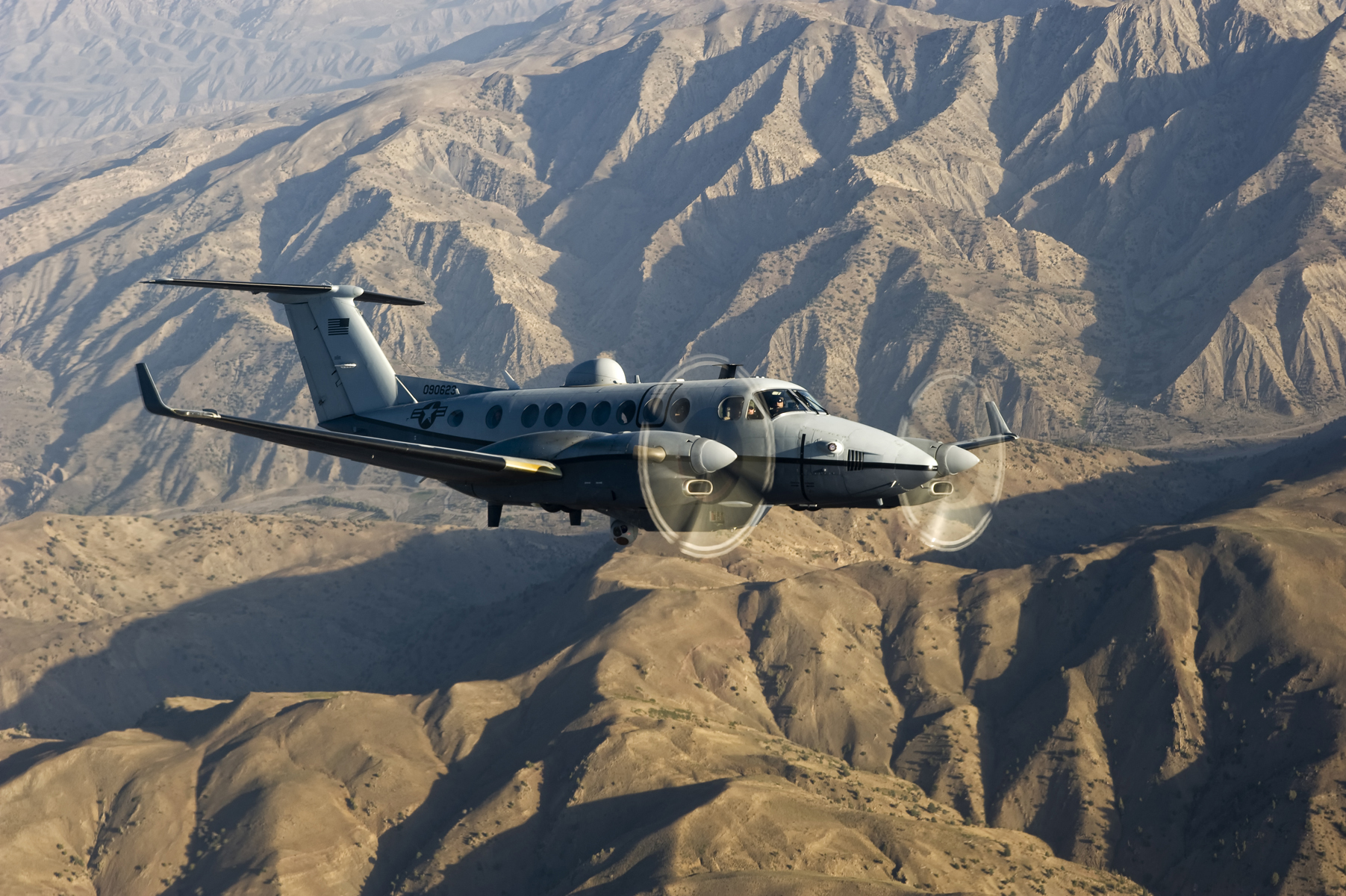
- MC-12W in flight (Note: Aircraft is Raytheon Beech MC-12W Liberty, serial 09-623. This plane was transferred to United States Special Operations Command in 2018. Baugher, Joe (21 November 2022). "2009 USAF Serial Numbers". Joe Baugher.)
- Active: 1943–1945; 1947–1953; 1953–present
- Country: United States
- Allegiance: Oklahoma
- Branch: Air National Guard
- Type: Squadron
- Role: Special operations
- Part of: Oklahoma Air National Guard
- Garrison/HQ: Will Rogers Air National Guard Base, Oklahoma
- Mottos: Air Guardsmen, fit to lead, highly trained and ready to conduct special operations ... anyplace ... anytime
- Decorations: Distinguished Unit Citation; French Croix de Guerre with Palm; Belgian Fourragère

Insignia
- 185th Special Operations Squadron emblem

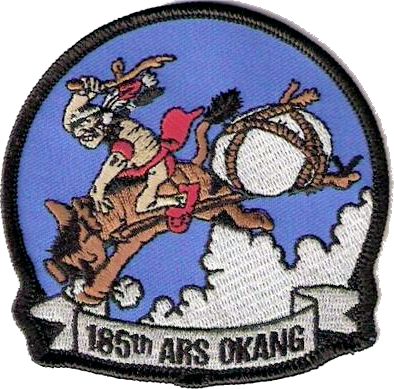
- 185 Air Transport Squadron emblem (Note: This emblem was also used when the squadron was the 185th Military Airlift Squadron, 185th Tactical Airlift Squadron, 185th Airlift Squadron, and 185th Air Refueling Squadron.)

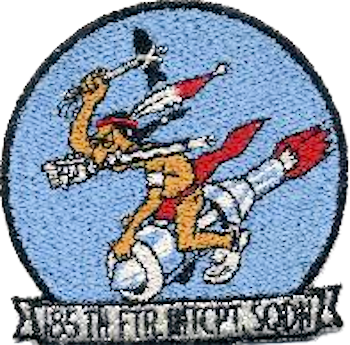
- 185th Fighter-Bomber Squadron emblem (Note: This emblem was also used when the squadron was the 185th Fighter-Interceptor Squadron.)

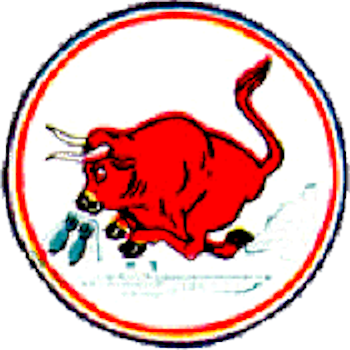
- 506th Fighter Squadron emblem
- World War II fuselage code: 4K

The 185th Special Operations Squadron is a unit of the Oklahoma Air National Guard's 137th Special Operations Wing, located at Will Rogers World Airport (Will Rogers Air National Guard Base), Oklahoma City, Oklahoma. The 185th is the only National Guard unit (and only US Air Force unit) to be equipped with the MC-12W. The unit is known as the "Sooners". Famous unit alumni include former Vietnam prisoner of war Brig. Gen. James Robinson "Robbie" Risner and Astronaut Captain Fred Wallace Haise Jr., Apollo 13 Lunar Module Pilot.

== History ==
=== World War II ===
The squadron was first organized at Key Field, Mississippi in February 1943 as the 620th Bombardment Squadron, one of the four original squadrons of the 404th Bombardment Group. The squadron was initially equipped with a mix of Douglas A-24 Banshees and Bell P-39 Airacobras. In July 1943, the squadron moved to Congaree Army Air Field, South Carolina, where it was redesignated the 506th Fighter-Bomber Squadron The following month. In early 1944, the squadron converted to Republic P-47 Thunderbolts. Completing its training for combat in March, it deployed to the United Kingdom.

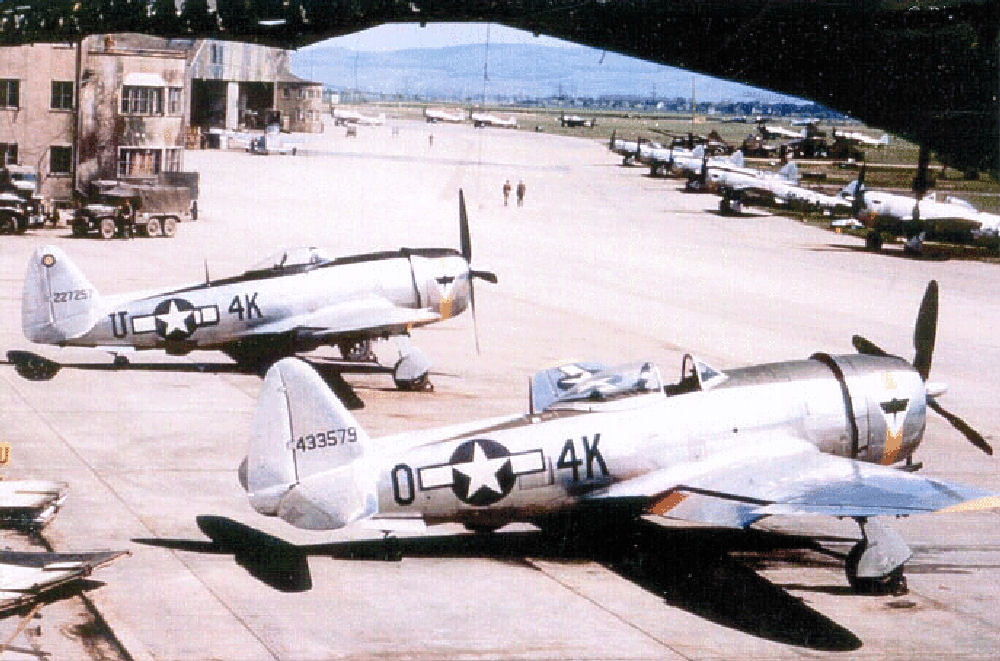
506th Fighter Squadron P-47 Thunderbolts (Note: This photograph was likely taken at Kelz Airfield or Fritzlar Airfield, Germany in the spring of 1945. Aircraft in the foreground are Republic P-47D-30-RA Thunderbolt, serial 44-33579, fuselage code 4K-O (served in the Maryland Air National Guard after the war, crashed on 1 April 1950) and Republic P-47D-27-RE Thunderbolt, serial 42-27257, Maggie Zass, fuselage code 4K-U. Baugher, Joe (22 October 2022). "1944 USAF Serial Numbers". Joe Baugher. Baugher, Joe (5 April 2023). "1942 USAF Serial Numbers". Joe Baugher. Archived from the original on 14 October 2013.)

The squadron arrived at its first overseas station, RAF Winkton, England in early April. It became operational on 1 May and began bombing and strafing targets in France to help prepare for Operation Overlord, the invasion of Normandy. At the end of the month, it dropped the "Bomber" from its name and became the 506th Fighter Squadron, but retained the air support mission. The squadron provided top cover for the landings on D-Day. A month later, on 6 July, the squadron moved to Chippelle Airfield in France, from which it provided air support for Operation Cobra, the Allied breakout at Saint-Lô, later that month. Despite suffering heavy losses from flak, the squadron helped cover four armored divisions dunging the breakout. This support earned the squadron the French Croix de Guerre with Palm.

The squadron supported the Allied advance across the Netherlands, operating from bases in France and from Sint-Truiden Airfield, Belgium. Its actions in this area, resulted in the squadron being cited in the order of the day of the Belgian Army and the award of the Belgian Fourragère for its contributions to the liberation of the Belgian people. On 10 September, the squadron participated in three armed reconnaissance missions. On these missions, despite adverse weather and heavy antiaircraft fire, the squadron attacked lines of communications, factories and rail targets as ground forces advanced. These missions earned the squadron the Distinguished Unit Citation.

During December 1944 and January 1945, attacked German positions during the Battle of the Bulge. Later it supported Operation Lumberjack and the establishment of a bridgehead on the west bank of the Rhine in March 1945. The squadron also flew air interdiction missions, strafing and bombing troop concentrations, railroads, highways, bridges, ammunition and fuel dumps, armored vehicles, docks, and tunnels. It covered bombing missions by Boeing B-17 Flying Fortresses, Consolidated B-24 Liberators, and Martin B-26 Marauders. On 4 May, the squadron flew armed reconnaissance missions that would prove to be its last combat missions of the war.

The squadron briefly served with U.S. forces in the American occupation zone of Germany before returning to the United States in August 1945. It reassembled at Drew Field, Florida on 11 September, but was inactivated on 9 November 1945.

=== Oklahoma Air National Guard ===
The 506th Fighter Squadron was redesignated the 185th Fighter Squadron and allotted to the National Guard on 24 May 1946. It was organized at the Westheimer Airport, Oklahoma, and was extended federal recognition on 18 December 1947. The squadron was equipped with North American P-51D Mustang fighters and was assigned to the Oklahoma National Guard's 137th Fighter Group.

The 137th Fighter Group provided command and logistical support for both the 185th and the 125th Fighter Squadrons, based at Tulsa Municipal Airport. The 125th performed air defense training missions over Northern Oklahoma and the panhandle; the 185th trained over Southern Oklahoma to the Texas border.

In April 1949, a tornado struck the Airport at Norman. The damage was considered too extensive for economical repair and the decision was made to move the 185th Fighter Squadron to Will Rogers World Airport in Oklahoma City. The move was accomplished on 6 September 1949. Fortunately, none of the unit's F-51D aircraft were destroyed due to all being checked out by pilots for training flights away from base.

==== Korean War federalization ====
The 185th's parent 137th Fighter Group was federalized and ordered to active service on 10 October 1950. The squadron was then assigned directly to the Oklahoma Air National Guard, continuing its air defense mission. However, on 1 February 1951, the squadron was re-equipped with North American RF-51D Mustangs as the 185th Tactical Reconnaissance Squadron, and began training for tactical aerial reconnaissance and flying aerial photography missions.

The 185th was federalized and ordered to active service on 1 April 1951. It was assigned to the 118th Tactical Reconnaissance Group and moved to Memphis Municipal Airport the same month. The squadron moved to Shaw Air Force Base, South Carolina on 5 January 1952. Squadron RF-51Ds were sent to Korea along with many of their pilots and joined the 67th Tactical Reconnaissance Group where they served in combat. The remainder of the squadron were equipped with Lockheed RF-80A Shooting Star reconnaissance jets. On 1 January 1953 the 185th was inactivated and transferred its personnel and planes to the regular 30th Tactical Reconnaissance Squadron, which was simultaneously activated. It was returned to Oklahoma state control and to Will Rogers Airport as the 185th Fighter-Bomber Squadron.

==== Fighter interceptor mission ====
Reforming after their active duty service, the 185th was again assigned to the 137th Group on 1 January 1953, becoming Tactical Air Command gained. The squadron was equipped with Mustangs again, due to the shortage of jet aircraft in the United States (almost all were in Korea). In the spring of 1953 they received reworked F-80A Shooting Star aircraft, brought up to F-80C standards. On 1 July 1955 the squadron was given a fighter-interceptor mission in Air Defense Command, and it became the 185th Fighter-Interceptor Squadron, equipped with North American F-86D Sabres. Their F-80s were transferred to the civilian Federal Aviation Administration (FAA) for various experimental testing activities.

With the fighter interceptor mission assignment, the 185th also assumed a runway alert program on full 24-hour basis - with armed jet fighters ready to scramble at a moment's notice. This event brought the squadron into the daily combat operational program of the USAF, placing it on "the end of the runway" alongside regular USAF air defense fighter squadrons. In June 1959 the squadron traded their F-86Ds for the upgraded F-86L Sabre Interceptor with uprated afterburning engines and new electronics.

==== Strategic airlift ====
In April 1961, the 185th was traded its Sabre interceptors for 4-engined Boeing C-97 Stratofreighter transports and became the 185th Air Transport Squadron. With air transportation recognized as a critical wartime need, the 185th augmented Military Air Transport Service airlift capability worldwide in support of the Air Force's needs. Throughout the 1960s, the 185th flew long-distance transport missions in support of Air Force requirements, frequently sending aircraft to the Caribbean, Europe, Australia, Hawaii, Japan, the Philippines, and during the Vietnam War, to both South Vietnam, Okinawa and Thailand.

Part of the squadron's mission was a specially equipped C-97E, 51-0224, the "Miss Oklahoma City" also known as the "Talking Bird". From 1961 though 1963 the aircraft was used as an airborne command post to maintain constant secure communications between the nation's capital and President John F. Kennedy during his visits to foreign countries. The C-97s were retired in 1968 and the squadron re-equipped with Douglas C-124C Globemaster II heavy transports. The squadron continued to fly long-distance intercontinental airlift flights until the Globemasters were retired in 1975.

==== Tactical airlift ====
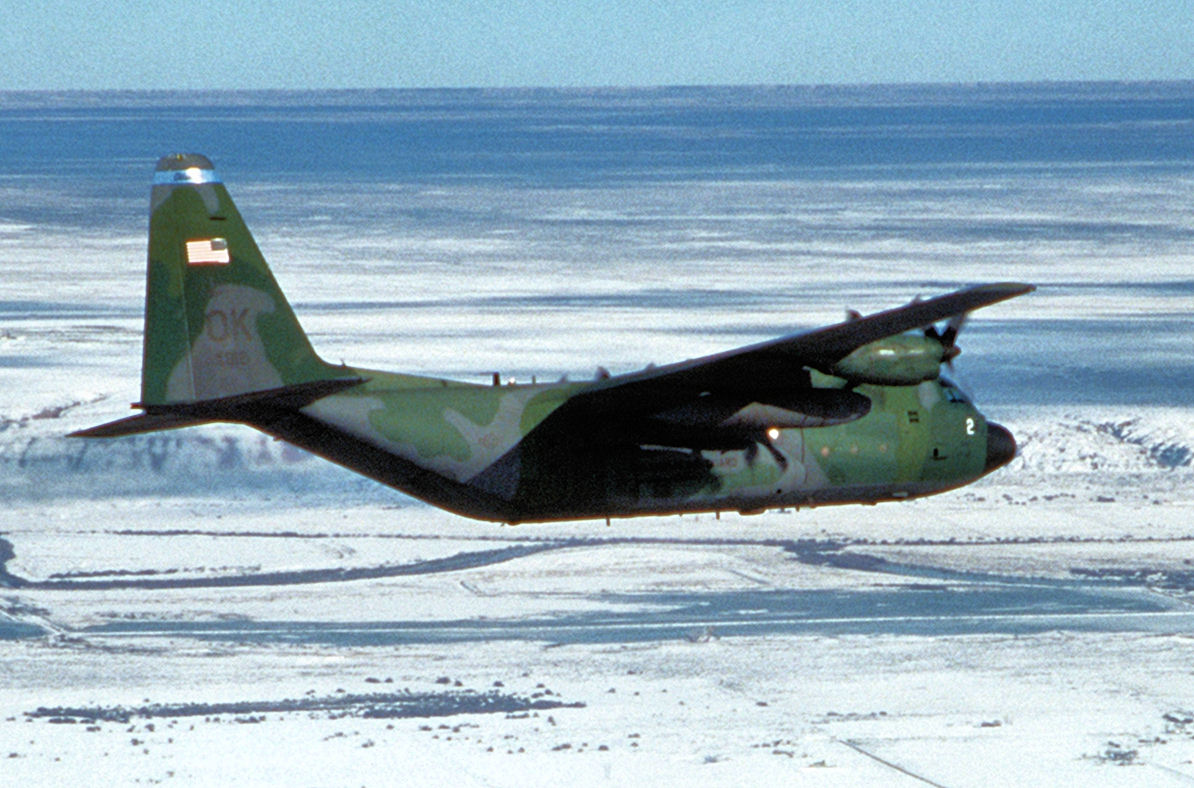
A squadron C-130H flies over snow blanketed New Mexico to deliver hay to cattle stranded after a major blizzard hit the area in December 1997 (Note: Aircraft is Lockheed C-130H-LM Hercules, serial 78-812. Baugher, Joe (12 April 2023). "1978 USAF Serial Numbers". Joe Baugher.)

In 1975 the squadron became the 185th Tactical Airlift Squadron when it was re-equipped with the Lockheed C-130A Hercules tactical airlifter. In June 1979 the 185th Tactical Airlift Squadron was the first Air National Guard unit to receive C-130H aircraft, receiving new aircraft direct from Lockheed.

In subsequent years the squadron served in humanitarian missions worldwide. During the 1990s the 185th provided counter-drug support coordinated through the Oklahoma Bureau of Narcotics and Dangerous Drugs. As of mid-2001, numerous drug enforcement operations had resulted in the destruction of 7.2 million marijuana plants, estimated 4.1 billion dollars in destroyed drugs, 814 arrests, 165 seized weapons, and 1.1 million dollars in currency and assets seized.

Following the Oklahoma City bombing in April 1995, unit air guardsmen provided site security and medical, rescue, and recovery personnel, assisting in every aspect of the disaster rescue and recovery effort. The squadron provided operational support during the 1991 Gulf War, and contributed logistical assistance in Bosnia in the late 1990s. Personnel from the squadron aided New Mexico ranchers faced with livestock devastation after severe winter storms covered the grasslands with snow. 137th aircrew delivered much needed hay to starving livestock, averting near disaster to New Mexico's livestock industry.

==== Air refueling ====
In its 2005 Base Realignment and Closure Commission recommendations, the Department of Defense recommended relocating the 137th Airlift Wing to Tinker Air Force Base and associate with the 507th Air Refueling Wing of Air Force Reserve Command. The squadron's C-130H aircraft would be distributed to the 136th Airlift Wing at NAS JRB Fort Worth, Texas (4 aircraft), and the 139th Airlift Wing at Rosecrans Memorial Airport, Missouri (4 aircraft). The other elements of the wing's expeditionary combat support would remain in place at Will Rogers. Beginning in October 2008, the 185th Air Refueling Squadron aircrews jointly operated the Boeing KC-135R Stratotanker aircraft at Tinker with the aircrews of the Air Force Reserve 465th Air Refueling Squadron.

=== Current status ===
As a result of the National Defense Authorization Act of 2015, the squadron transitioned from Air Mobility Command as an associate KC-135R unit at Tinker AFB to Air Force Special Operations Command as a MC-12W unit. The unit ceased operations as an associate unit flying KC-135s in the summer of 2015.

It started receiving its MC-12W aircraft in July 2015, returning to its previous home of Will Rogers World Airport/ANG Base. The squadron first deployed to support United States Special Operations Command elements in October 2017. While commonly known as "Liberty," after the Second World War Liberty ships, the aircraft does not have an official nickname, and AFMC's Project Liberty Office was closed upon transfer of the aircraft to the Project Javaman Office for support to United States Special Operations Command. 'Javaman' was named after a declassified World War II naval project involving remote control attack boats controlled by retrofitted bomber aircraft.

== Lineage ==
- Constituted as the 620th Bombardment Squadron (Dive) on 25 January 1943

Activated on 4 February 1943
Redesignated 506th Fighter-Bomber Squadron on 10 August 1943
Redesignated 506th Fighter Squadron on 30 May 1944
Inactivated on 9 November 1945
Redesignated 185th Fighter Squadron, and allotted to the National Guard on 24 May 1946
Organized on 18 February 1947
Extended federal recognition on 18 December 1947
Redesignated 185th Tactical Reconnaissance Squadron on 1 February 1951
Ordered to active duty on 1 April 1951
Inactivated on 1 January 1953
Redesignated 185th Fighter-Bomber Squadron and activated in the Oklahoma Air National Guard 1 January 1953
Redesignated 185th Fighter-Interceptor Squadron c. 1 July 1955
Redesignated 185th Air Transport Squadron, Heavy c. 1 April 1961
Redesignated 185th Military Airlift Squadron on 1 January 1966
Redesignated 185th Tactical Airlift Squadron on 10 December 1974
Redesignated 185th Airlift Squadron c. 16 May 1992
Redesignated 185th Air Refueling Squadron on 1 October 2008
Redesignated 185th Special Operations Squadron on 1 October 2015

=== Assignments ===
- 404th Bombardment Group (later 404th Fighter-Bomber Group, 404th Fighter Group), 4 February 1943 – 9 November 1945
- Oklahoma Air National Guard, 18 February 1947
- 137th Fighter Group, 1 September 1947
- 140th Fighter Group, 10 October 1950
- Fourteenth Air Force, 1 April 1951
- 118th Tactical Reconnaissance Group, April 1951 – 1 January 1953
- 137th Fighter-Bomber Group (later 137th Fighter-Interceptor Group, 137th Air Transport Group, 137th Military Airlift Group), 1 January 1953
- 137th Military Airlift Wing (later 137th Tactical Airlift Wing), 10 December 1974
- 137th Operations Group (later 137th Special Operations Group), 16 May 1992 – present

=== Stations ===
- Key Field, Mississippi, 4 February 1943
- Congaree Army Air Field, South Carolina, 3 July 1943
- Burns Army Airfield, Oregon, 2 September 1943
- Myrtle Beach Army Air Field, South Carolina, 13 November 1943 – 13 March 1944
- RAF Winkton (AAF-414), England, 5 April 1944
- Chippelle Airfield (A-5), France, 6 July 1944
- Bretigny Airfield (A-48), France, 29 August 1944
- Juvincourt Airfield (A-68), France, 11 September 1944
- Sint-Truiden Airfield (A-92), Belgium, 1 October 1944
- Kelz Airfield (Y-54), Germany, 30 March 1945
- Fritzlar Airfield (Y-86), Germany, 12 April 1945
- AAF Station Stuttgart/Echterdingen (R-50), Germany, 23 June–c. 2 August 1945
- Drew Field, Florida, 11 September – 9 November 1945
- Westheimer Airport, Oklahoma, 18 December 1947
- Will Rogers World Airport, Oklahoma, 6 September 1949
- Memphis Municipal Airport, c. 12 April 1951
- Shaw Air Force Base, South Carolina, 5 January 1952 – 1 January 1953
- Will Rogers World Airport (later Will Rogers Air National Guard Base), Oklahoma, 1 January 1953
- Tinker Air Force Base, Oklahoma, 1 October 2008 – June 2015
- Will Rogers Air National Guard Base, Oklahoma, June 2015 – Present

=== Aircraft ===
- Douglas A-24 Banshee, 1943-1944
- Bell P-39 Airacobra, 1943-1944
- Republic P-47 Thunderbolt, 1944–1945
- North American P-51D (later F-51D) Mustang, 1947-1951
- North American RF-51D Mustang, 1951-1952
- Lockheed RF-80A Shooting Star, 1952-1953
- North American F-51 Mustang, 1953
- Lockheed F-80C Shooting Star, 1953-1958
- North American F-86D Sabre, 1958-1959
- North American F-86L Sabre, 1959-1961
- Boeing C-97G Stratofreighter, 1961-1968
- Douglas C-124C Globemaster II, 1968-1975
- Lockheed C-130A Hercules, 1975-1979
- Lockheed C-130H Hercules, 1979-2008
- Boeing KC-135R Stratotanker, 2008–2015
- Beechcraft MC-12W Huron, 2015–present

== Bibliography ==
- Anderson, Capt. Barry (1985). Army Air Forces Stations: A Guide to the Stations Where U.S. Army Air Forces Personnel Served in the United Kingdom During World War II (PDF). Maxwell AFB, AL: Research Division, USAF Historical Research Center. Archived from the original (PDF) on 23 January 2016.
- Cornett, Lloyd H; Johnson, Mildred W (1980). A Handbook of Aerospace Defense Organization, 1946 - 1980 (PDF). Peterson AFB, CO: Office of History, Aerospace Defense Center. Archived from the original (PDF) on 13 February 2016.
- Johnson, 1st Lt. David C. (1988). U.S. Army Air Forces Continental Airfields (ETO) D-Day to V-E Day (PDF). Maxwell AFB, AL: Research Division, USAF Historical Research Center. Archived from the original (PDF) on 29 September 2015.
- Maurer, Maurer, ed. (1983) [1961]. Air Force Combat Units of World War II (PDF) (reprint ed.). Washington, DC: Office of Air Force History. ISBN 0-912799-02-1. LCCN 61060979.
- Maurer, Maurer, ed. (1982) [1969]. Combat Squadrons of the Air Force, World War II (PDF) (reprint ed.). Washington, DC: Office of Air Force History. ISBN 0-405-12194-6. LCCN 70605402. OCLC 72556. Archived from the original (PDF) on 20 December 2016.
- Robertson, Bruce, ed. (1961). United States Army and Air Force Fighters 1916-1961. Hertfordshire, England: Harleyford Publishers, Lts. OCLC 6398505.
- Rogers, Brian. (2005). United States Air Force Unit Designations Since 1978. Hinkley, UK: Midland Publications. ISBN 1-85780-197-0.
- Rosenfeld, Susan; Gross, Charles J. (2007). Air National Guard at 60: A History (PDF). Bolling AFB, DC: Air National Guard History Office. Archived from the original (PDF) on 13 February 2016.
- Rust, Kenn C. (1967). The 9th Air Force in World War II. Fallbrook, CA: Aero Publishers, Inc. LCCN 67-16454.
- Watkins, Robert (2008). Battle Colors. Vol. III Insignia and Markings of the Ninth Air Force in World War II. Atglen, PA: Shiffer Publishing Ltd. ISBN 978-0-7643-2938-8.
