= 188th Rescue Squadron =

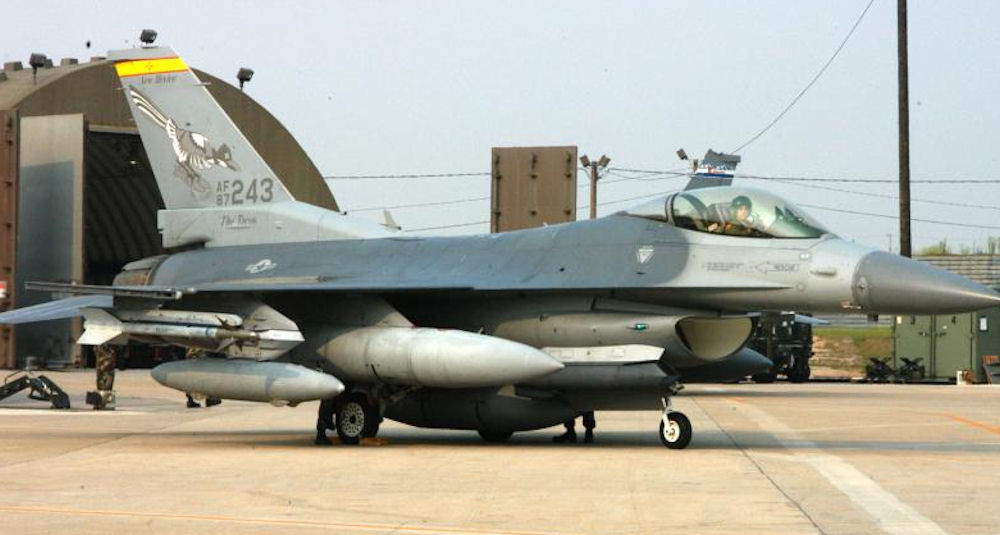
- 188th Fighter Squadron F-16C Fighting Falcon (Note: Aircraft is General Dynamics F-16C Block 30F Fighting Falcon, serial 87-0243)
- Active: 1943–1945; 1947–1953; 1953–present
- Country: United States
- Branch: Air National Guard
- Type: Squadron
- Role: Aircrew Training
- Part of: New Mexico Air National Guard
- Garrison/HQ: Kirtland Air Force Base, New Mexico
- Nicknames: "Enchilada Air Force" "The Tacos"
- Engagements: European Theater of Operations
- Decorations: Distinguished Unit Citation; Air Force Outstanding Unit Award with Combat "V' Device; French Croix de Guerre with Palm; Belgian Fourragère

Commanders
- Current commander: Lt. Col. Lonnie Mazuranich

Insignia
- 188th Fighter Squadron emblem
- Tail markings: Yellow Tail Stripe, "Roadrunner". In small letters on the base of the tail are the words "The Tacos"
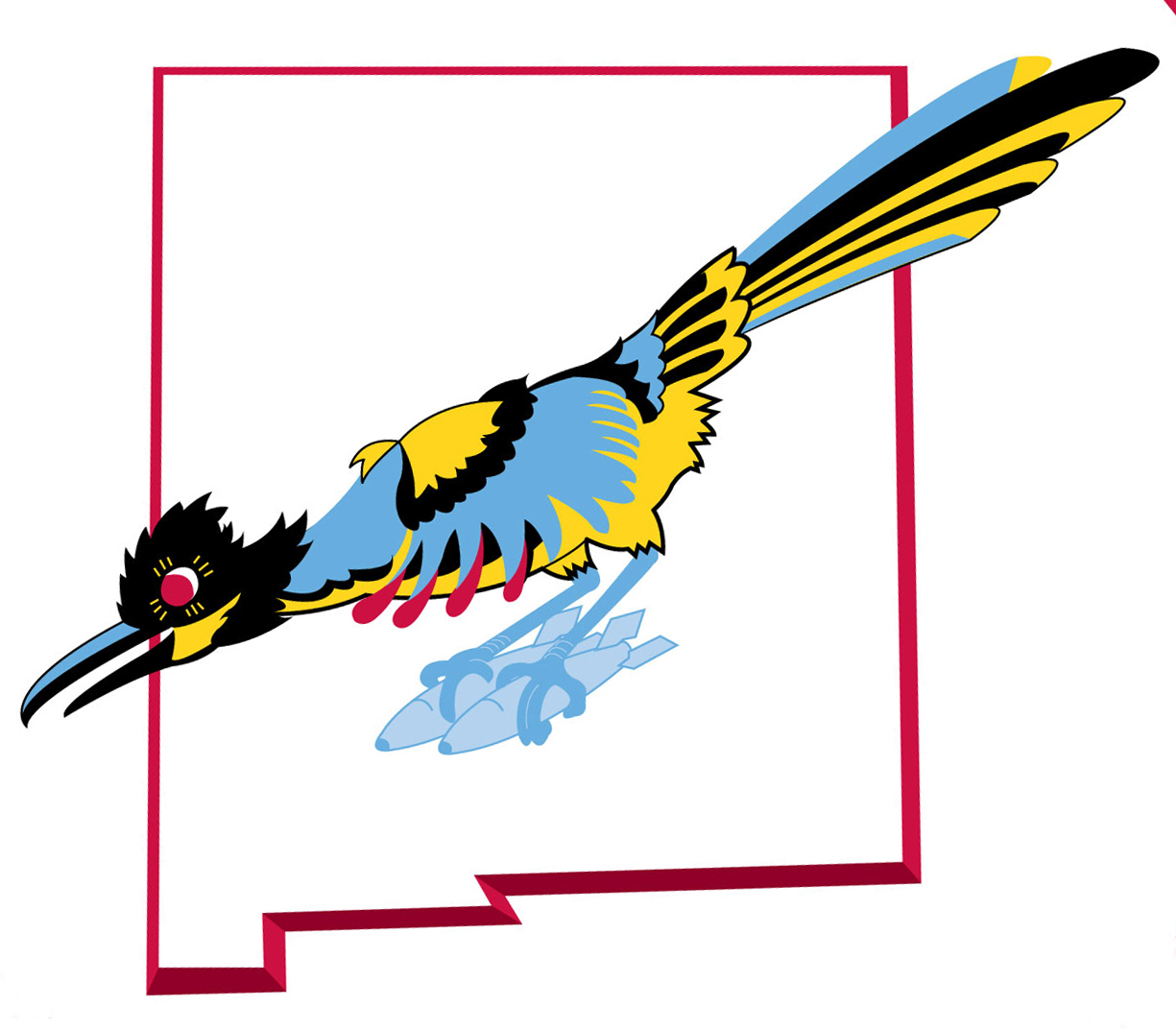
- 188th Fighter-Bomber Squadron emblem

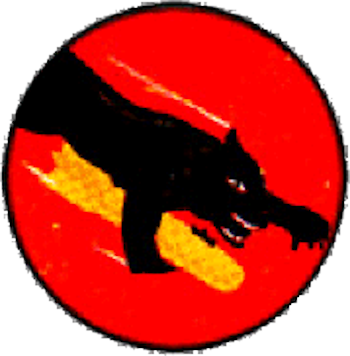
- 507th Fighter Squadron Emblem
- World War II fuselage code: Y8

The 188th Rescue Squadron, nicknamed the Tacos, is unit of the New Mexico Air National Guard. It is assigned to the 150th Special Operations Wing located at Kirtland Air Force Base, New Mexico, from where they operate three Lockheed HC-130J Combat King IIs.

== History ==
=== World War II ===
The squadron was first organized at Key Field, Mississippi in February 1943 as the 621st Bombardment Squadron, one of the four original squadrons of the 404th Bombardment Group. The squadron was initially equipped with a mix of Douglas A-24 Banshees and Bell P-39 Airacobras. In July 1943, the squadron moved to Congaree Army Air Field, South Carolina, where it was redesignated the 507th Fighter-Bomber Squadron The following month. In early 1944, the squadron converted to Republic P-47 Thunderbolts. Completing its training for combat in March, it deployed to the United Kingdom.

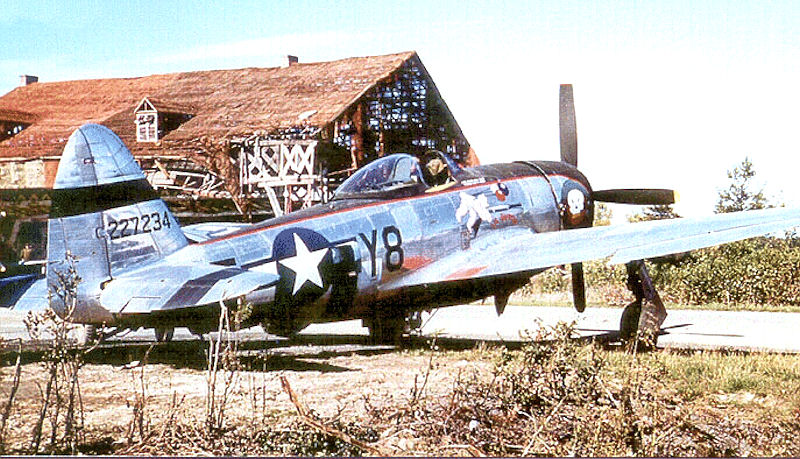
507th Fighter Squadron P-47D Thunderbolt (Note: Aircraft is Republic P-47D-27-RE Thunderbolt, serial 42-27234, Li'l Butch, fuselage code Y8-E. Shot down by flak on 13 April 1945. Baugher, Joe (5 April 2023). "1942 USAF Serial Numbers". Joe Baugher. Missing Air Crew Report 13013.)

The squadron arrived at its first overseas station, RAF Winkton, England in early April. It became operational on 1 May and began bombing and strafing targets in France to help prepare for Operation Overlord, the invasion of Normandy. At the end of the month, it dropped the "Bomber" from its name and became the 507th Fighter Squadron, but retained the air support mission. The squadron provided top cover for the landings on D-Day. A month later, on 6 July, the squadron moved to Chippelle Airfield in France, from which it provided air support for Operation Cobra, the Allied breakout at Saint-Lô, later that month. Despite suffering heavy losses from flak, the squadron helped cover four armored divisions dunging the breakout. This support earned the squadron the French Croix de Guerre with Palm.

The squadron supported the Allied advance across the Netherlands, operating from bases in France and from Sint-Truiden Airfield, Belgium. Its actions in this area, resulted in the squadron being cited in the order of the day of the Belgian Army and the award of the Belgian Fourragère for its contributions to the liberation of the Belgian people. On 10 September, the squadron participated in three armed reconnaissance missions. On these missions, despite adverse weather and heavy antiaircraft fire, the squadron attacked lines of communications, factories and rail targets as ground forces advanced. These missions earned the squadron the Distinguished Unit Citation.

During December 1944 and January 1945, attacked German positions during the Battle of the Bulge. Later it supported Operation Lumberjack and the establishment of a bridgehead on the west bank of the Rhine in March 1945. The squadron also flew air interdiction missions, strafing and bombing troop concentrations, railroads, highways, bridges, ammunition and fuel dumps, armored vehicles, docks, and tunnels. It covered bombing missions by Boeing B-17 Flying Fortresses, Consolidated B-24 Liberators, and Martin B-26 Marauders. On 4 May, the squadron flew armed reconnaissance missions that would prove to be its last combat missions of the war.

The squadron briefly served with occupation forces in Germany before returning to the United States in August 1945. It reassembled at Drew Field, Florida on 11 September, but was inactivated on 9 November 1945.

=== New Mexico Air National Guard ===
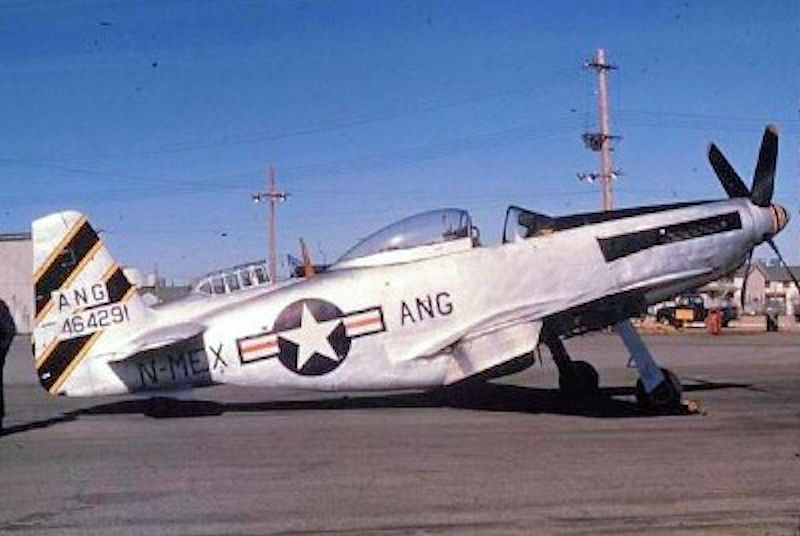
188th Fighter Squadron F-51H Mustang (Note: Aircraft is North American F-51H-5-NA Mustang, serial 44-64291.)

507th Fighter Squadron was redesignated the 188th Fighter Squadron on 24 May 1946, and allotted to the National Guard. It was organized at Kirtland Field, New Mexico and was extended federal recognition on 7 July 1947. The squadron was equipped with North American F-51D Mustangs and a few Douglas A-26 Invaders, The 188th's post-war mission was the air defense of New Mexico.

==== Korean War federalization ====
On 10 February 1951, the 188th was federalized and brought to active duty for the Korean War. A total of 54 officers and 400 airmen moved to Long Beach Municipal Airport, California, as part of the 1st Fighter-Interceptor Wing. It was redesignated the 188th Fighter-Interceptor Squadron, with a mission of air defense of Southern California. Most unit members were transferred to active-duty Air Force units and deployed to Japan and South Korea. First Lieutenants Robert Lucas and Joseph Murray were killed while flying close air support missions in Korea. Captain Francis Williams and First Lieutenant Robert Sands were each credited with three MiG-15 kills. The squadron was kept up to strength with regulars, reservists and other guardsmen.

The squadron began to re-equip with North American F-86E Sabres in October 1951, but reverted to Mustangs two months later. Air Defense Command, however, was having difficulty adapting the wing base organization to the dispersed squadrons required for the air defense mission. In February 1952, it inactivated its fighter wings, including the 1st Wing, and replaced them with regional organizations. The squadron was assigned to the 4705th Defense Wing, which acted as a temporary headquarters for former 1st Wing operational squadrons. In March, the squadron was assigned to the 27th Air Division. The unit was released from active duty in November 1952, transferring its personnel and Mustangs to the regular 354th Fighter-Interceptor Squadron, which was simultaneously activated.

==== Cold War ====
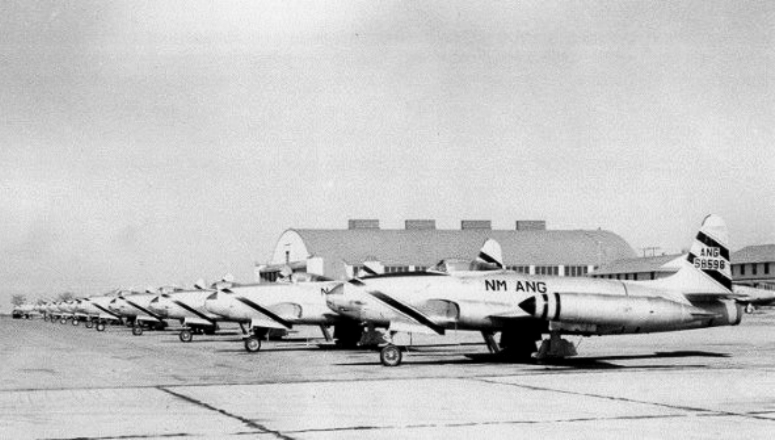
F-80C Shooting Star fighters from the 188th Fighter Squadron

After the Korean War ended, the 188th was redesignated the 188th Fighter-Bomber Squadron and equipped with Lockheed F-80C Shooting Star jet aircraft. In July 1955, it once again became the 188th Fighter-Interceptor Squadron and augmented Air Defense Command, being gained by Western Air Defense Force.

On 1 July 1957, the 188th was authorized to expand to a group level, and the 150th Fighter Group was established. The 188th becoming the group's flying squadron. Other squadrons assigned into the group were the group headquarters, 150th Material Squadron (Maintenance), 150th Air Base Squadron, and the 150th USAF Dispensary. Also, the 188th assumed 24-hour air defense alert status at Kirtland. In April 1958, the first Air National Guard unit to receive the North American F-100A Super Sabre was the 188th, which received these planes in April 1958. This conversion raised group strength to 956 officers and airmen.

In April 1961, an aircraft malfunction caused an AIM-9 Sidewinder air-to-air missile to launch and shoot down a Boeing B-52B Stratofortress bomber near Grants, New Mexico. The B-52B, from the 95th Bombardment Wing took off from Biggs Air Force Base, Texas on a training mission. During an intercept by two New Mexico ANG F-100As, an AIM-9B launched and impacted one of the engine pods on the bomber's left wing, taking the B-52's left wing off in the subsequent explosion. Three B-52 crewmembers died; the F-100 pilot was absolved of any blame. In the fall of 1962, the Cuban Missile Crisis put the 188th on an alert status that lasted for 90 days.

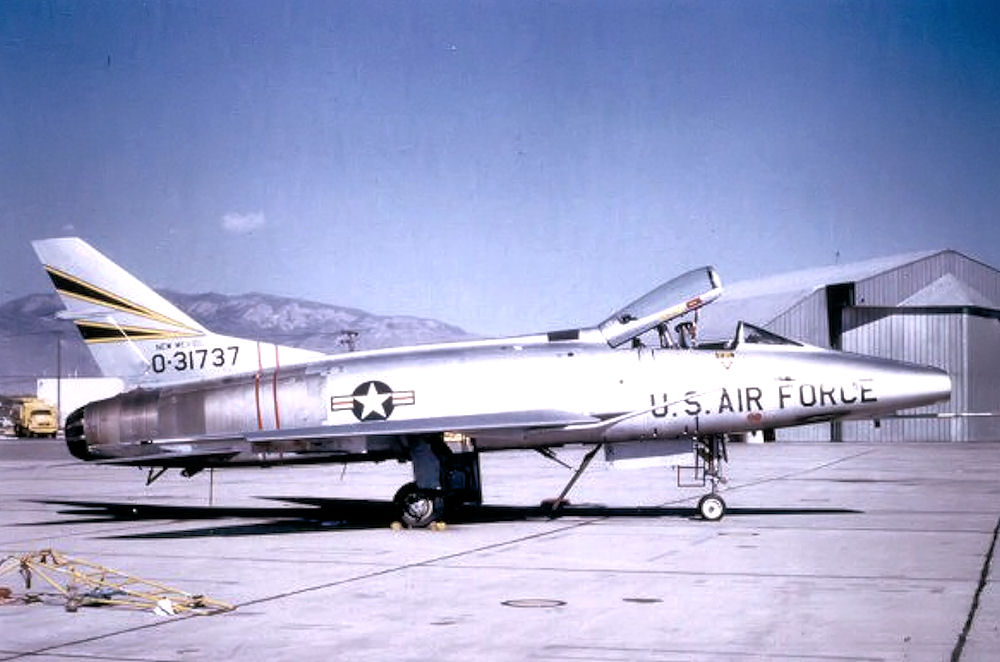
188th TFS F-100C Super Sabre (Note: Aircraft is North American F-100C-1-NA Super Sabre, serial 53-1737, taken in 1965. It was sent to the Military Aircraft Storage and Disposition Center on 26 June 1974. Later used as a target at the Avon Park Gunnery Range. Baugher, Joe (2 April 2023). "1953 USAF Serial Numbers". Joe Baugher.)

In 1964, the F-100As were retired and the 188th received newer F-100C and twin-seat F-100F Super Sabre trainers, and became the 188th Tactical Fighter Squadron, gained by Tactical Air Command. In January 1968, the group was activated as a result of the Pueblo Crisis, and in June of that year the squadron and approximately 250 maintenance and support personnel were deployed to Tuy Hoa Air Base, South Vietnam. Remaining group members were assigned to various bases in South Korea. The unit flew over 6000 combat sorties in the F-100C Super Sabre and amassed over 630 medals and decorations before release from federal active duty in June 1969. Captain Michael Adams was killed in action and Major Bobby Neeld and First Lieutenant Mitchell Lane remain listed as missing in action. The unit received the Air Force Outstanding Unit Award with Combat "V' Device. After its Vietnam War deployment, the 188th was relieved from active duty and returned to New Mexico State Control on 4 June 1969.

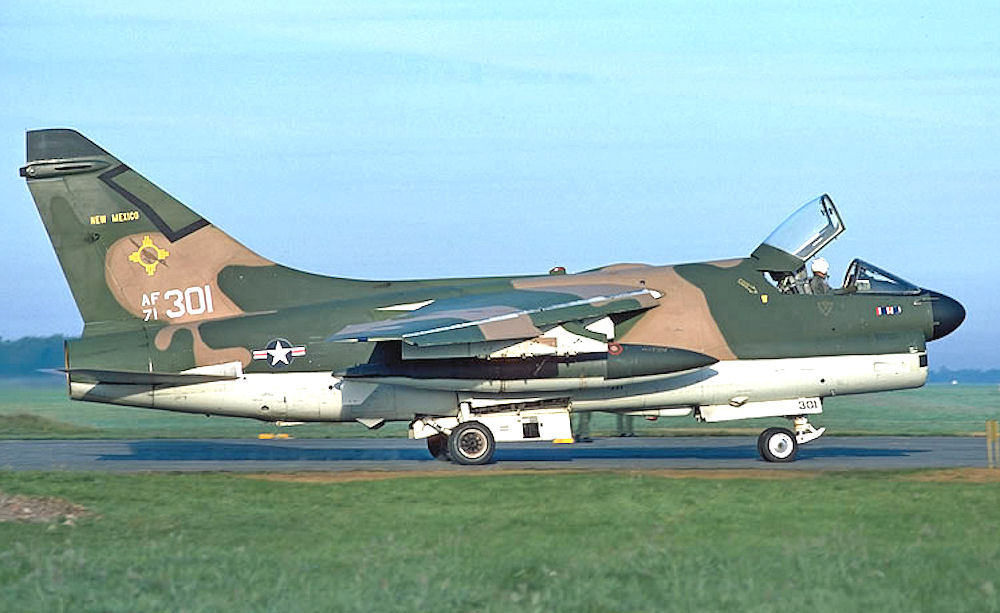
188th A-7D, about 1976 (Note: Aircraft is LTV A-7D Corsair II, serial 71-0301. This plane was sent to the Aerospace Maintenance and Regeneration Center (AMARC) on 17 September 1992. Baugher, Joe (5 May 2023). "1971 USAF Serial Numbers". Joe Baugher.)

In 1973, after the United States withdrew its forces from South Vietnam, the 188th became the first Air National Guard squadron to receive LTV A-7D Corsair II subsonic tactical close air support aircraft from Tactical Air Command units that were preparing to receive the new Fairchild Republic A-10 Thunderbolt II. Receiving its aircraft from the 354th Tactical Fighter Wing at Myrtle Beach Air Force Base and the 355th Tactical Fighter Wing at Davis-Monthan Air Force Base, Arizona. The aircraft had excellent accuracy with the aid of an automatic electronic navigation and weapons delivery system. Although designed primarily as a ground attack aircraft, it also had limited air-to-air combat capability.

In 1977, the unit participated in the "Coronet Ante" exercise, which was part of the North Atlantic Treaty Organization "Coldfire" exercise in Europe. The 150th TFG deployed nine A-7Ds to Gilze Rijen Air Base, The Netherlands, from 2 September through 27 September 1977. Close air support missions were flown over The Netherlands, France, the United Kingdom, Germany, Belgium, and the North Sea. In 1980, the 188th received the new twin-seat A-7K trainer.

In 1980, the 150th Tactical Fighter Group was the first guard unit to be assigned to the Rapid Deployment Joint Task Force; the first to participate in Bright Star joint service exercises in Southwest Asia; the first to receive the Low Altitude Night Attack modification to the A-7D; the first to participate in a deployed bare base operational readiness inspection, and the first to have a crew chief as a member of the Air Force Thunderbirds. Additionally, the unit set an A-7D and first endurance record of 11 1/2 hours non-stop from Pease Air Force Base, New Hampshire to Cairo West Air Base, Egypt.

The unit was partially activated in support of Operation Desert Storm, although no A-7D aircraft were sent to Southwest Asia. On 11 December 1990, 44 members of the 150th Security Police Flight and other unit members were deployed to Saudi Arabia. All members returned home by May 1991.

==== Post Cold War operations ====
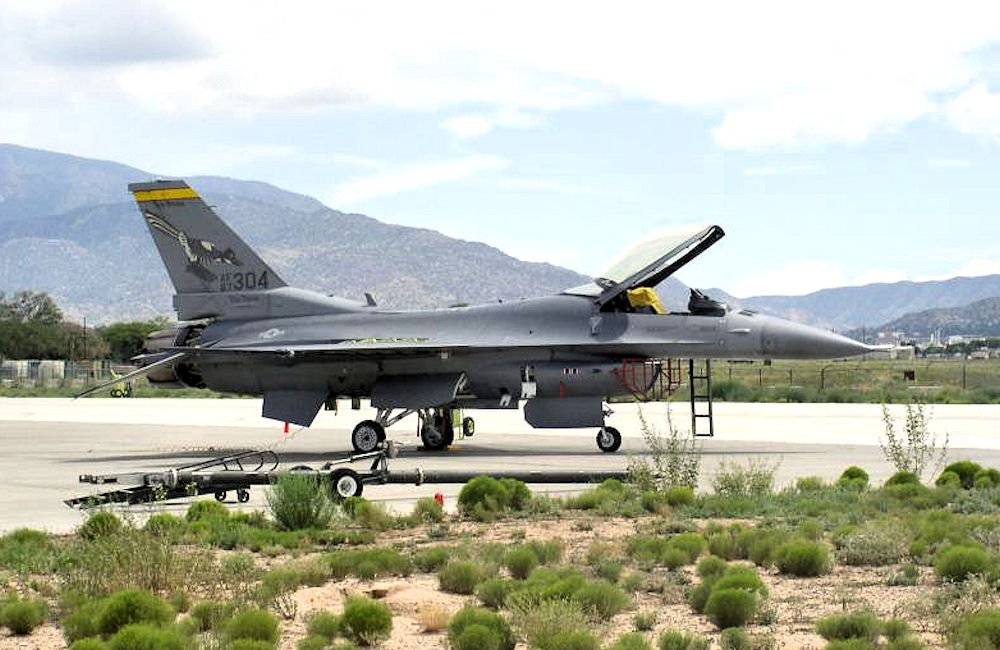
Squadron F-16C with engine work being performed (Note: Aircraft is General Dynamics F-16C block 30, serial 87-0304.)

Early in the 1990s with the end of the Cold War and the continued decline in military budgets, the Air Force restructured to meet changes in strategic requirements, decreasing personnel, and a smaller infrastructure. The 150th Group adopted the new USAF Objective Wing Organization in early 1992, with the word "tactical" being eliminated from its designation and the squadron became the 188th Fighter Squadron.

The 188th flew A-7D's for twenty years before converting to the General Dynamics F-16 Fighting Falcon. On 11 May 1992 the 188th received its first Block 40 F-16C and their last A-7D left on 28 September 1992, being retired to Davis-Monthan AFB Aerospace Maintenance and Regeneration Center storage. With this event the A-7D was almost phased out completely as the 188th was one of the last Air National Guard units to fly the venerable aircraft.

However, instead of converting to older F-16A/B models, the squadron received relatively new block 40 aircraft. This type had the Low Altitude Night Targeting Infra Red Navigational system (LANTIRN) on board for advanced navigation and targeting by day and night. Again, the 188th was the first within the Air National Guard to have this capacity. On 1 October 150th expanded to become a Wing, and the 188th Fighter Squadron became part of the new 150th Operations Group.

==== 150th Defense System Evaluation Flight ====
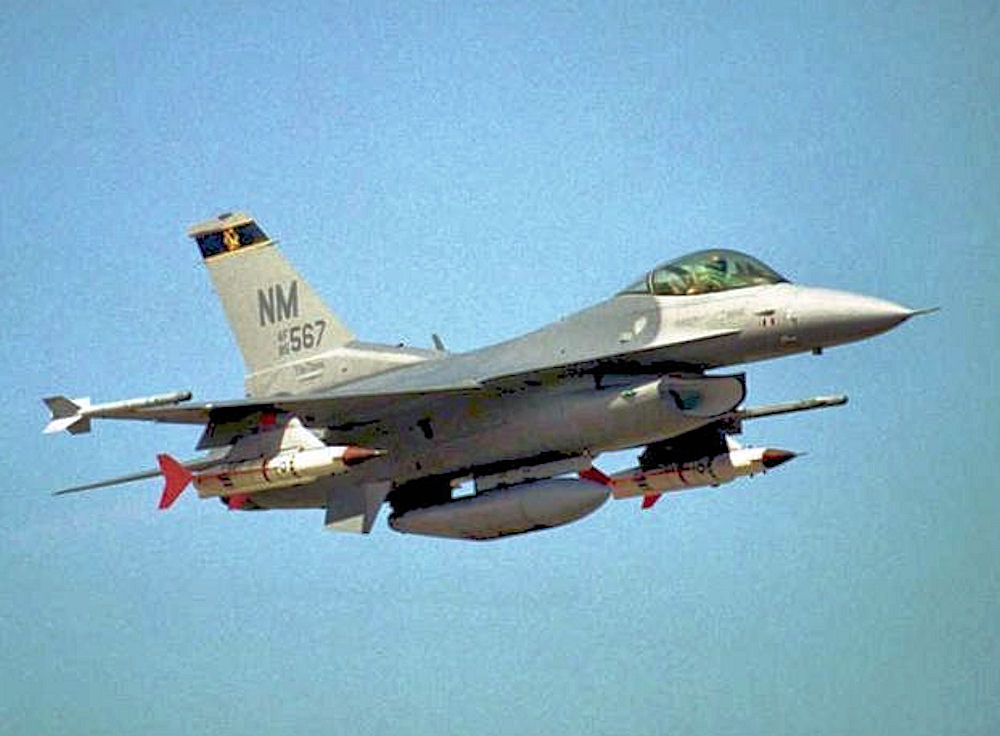
150th DSEF F-16C in flight (Note: Aircraft is General dynamics F-16C Block 30 Fighting Falcon, serial 85-1567. This plane went to AMARC on 12 August 2010. Baugher, Joe (8 April 2023). "1985 USAF Serial Numbers". Joe Baugher. Note the black tail flash of the 150th DSEF, rather than the yellow which the 188th flew from 1992 to 2010.)

An out of the ordinary organizational setup was also at hand in the 188th. Within the squadron was another flight – being the 150th Defense Systems Evaluation Flight – which flew F-16C block 30 aircraft. It typically had about five on hand. Even during the time frame when the 188th was flying block 40s the flight had F-16 block 30s. The flight provided fighter aircraft support to the US Army Air Defense Center and White Sands Missile Range.

Typically testing for the army and various navies around the world. With the USAF, the flight was selected to do all the flight tests for the F/A-22 Raptor before they leave the Marietta factory in Georgia. Tests usually involved avionics, radar systems and more. The squadron would deploy two F-16s to the Marietta factory adjacent to Dobbins Air Reserve Base, Atlanta, Georgia for a six-week period for each test. But for the most part any other tests were done over the White Sands Missile Range in New Mexico. The flight was discontinued in 2007 with many jets departing during the year prior.

==== Expeditionary Force deployments ====
In mid-1996, the Air Force, in response to budget cuts, and changing world situations, began experimenting with air expeditionary organizations. The Air Expeditionary Force concept was developed that would mix active duty, reserve and Air National Guard elements into a combined force. Instead of entire permanent units deploying as "provisional" as in the 1991 Gulf War, Expeditionary units are composed of "aviation packages" from several wings, including active-duty Air Force, the Air Force Reserve Command and the Air National Guard, would be married together to carry out the assigned deployment rotation.

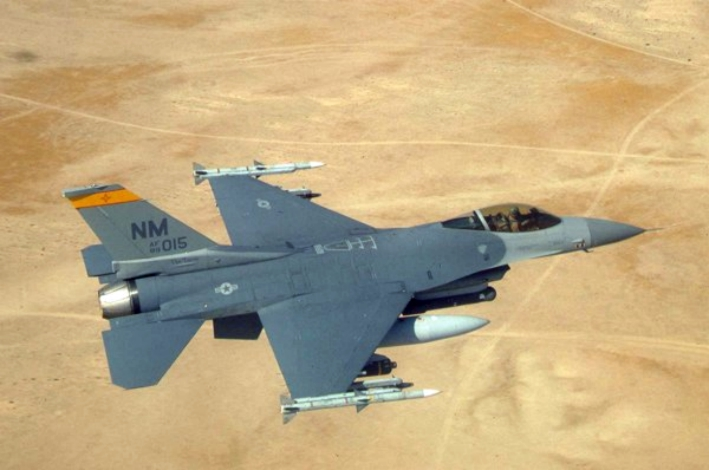
188th F-16C during Operation Southern Watch deployment (Note: Aircraft is General Dynamics F-16C Block 40D Fighting Falcon, serial 88-0515 in 1998. Between 1992 – 2003, the squadron flew with an NM tail code.)

In April 1998, the squadron was the major force provider for the 188th Expeditionary Fighter Squadron, deploying 6 F-16s and support personnel to Ahmad al-Jaber Air Base, Kuwait in support of Operation Southern Watch. Operation Southern Watch was an operation which was responsible for enforcing the United Nations mandated no-fly zone below the 32nd parallel in Iraq. This mission was initiated mainly to cover for attacks of Iraqi forces on the Iraqi Shi’ite Muslims. The expeditionary squadron was inactivated in July 1998.

==== Twenty-first century ====
Another 188th Expeditionary Fighter Squadron was activated in March 2001, (Note: Because they are provisional units, expeditionary units are considered different units, even when they have the same designation, with the exception of "rainbow" units that have been assigned to major commands.) deploying to Incirlik Air Base, Turkey in support of Operation Northern Watch. Operation Northern Watch was a US European Command Combined Task Force which was responsible for enforcing the United Nations mandated no-fly zone above the 36th parallel in Iraq. This mission was a successor to Operation Provide Comfort which also entailed support for the Iraqi Kurds. The deployed personnel and aircraft returned in June 2001 and the 188th EFS was again inactivated.

After the attacks of 11 September 2001, the squadron supported several deployments in support of Operation Noble Eagle to Atlantic City Air National Guard Base, New Jersey and March Air Reserve Base, California. Within hours of the terrorist attacks on New York and Washington, squadron pilots flew combat air patrol sorties over key resources in the western United States, and continued to do so for many months. Expeditionary squadrons have also been activated, deploying worldwide in the F-16 to Singapore, Australia, Chile, and South Korea. In May 2004, the 188th deployed its F-16s to Balad Air Base, Iraq, becoming the first U. S. fighter squadron to be stationed at the base. In October 2007, the unit returned to Balad as part of a rainbow deployment Air Expeditionary Force 9/10 (Cycle 6) which included the 119th, 120th, 134th, 163rd, 186th and 188th squadrons. The deployment cycle started in September and the 188th sent six aircraft with two spares that returned stateside immediately.

==== Special operations ====
Although rated a number one facility in the 2005 Base Realignment and Closure plan, the USAF decided to close down the squadron and convert Kirtland from a fighter to a special operations base as part of the reduction of the USAF fighter fleet by 250 aircraft. It was hoped that some of the money saved would allow the USAF to purchase new aircraft, such as the F-35A Lightning II. In 2009, the 21 F-16C/D aircraft of the New Mexico ANG were reassigned to other Air National Guard units in the District of Columbia Air National Guard and the Vermont Air National Guard as part of the "Fiscal Year 2010 Combat Air Force Restructure". The last two F-16s left Kirtland in September 2010. The 150th was to become an associate wing of Kirtland's 58th Special Operations Wing, with the 188th Fighter Squadron being redesignated as the 188th Rescue Squadron in February 2012.

On 25 October 2024, the 188th RQS regained its own aircraft with the assignment of three Lockheed HC-130J Combat King II to the unit.

== Lineage ==
- Constituted as the 621st Bombardment Squadron (Dive)' on 25 January 1943

Activated on 4 February 1943
Redesignated 507th Fighter-Bomber Squadron on 10 August 1943
Redesignated 507th Fighter Squadron on 30 May 1944
Inactivated on 9 November 1945

- Redesignated 188th Fighter Squadron and allotted to the National Guard on 24 May 1946

Activated and received federal recognition on 7 July 1947
Federalized and ordered to active service on 1 February 1951
Redesignated 188th Fighter-Interceptor Squadron c. 10 February 1951
Inactivated on 10 November 1952
Redesignated 188th Fighter-Bomber Squadron, returned to New Mexico state control and activated on 1 January 1953
Redesignated 188th Fighter-Interceptor Squadron on 1 July 1955
Redesignated 188th Tactical Fighter Squadron, 1 April 1964
Federalized and ordered to active service on 7 January 1968
Relieved from active duty and returned to New Mexico state control on 18 May 1969
Redesignated 188th Fighter Squadron on 16 March 1992
Redesignated 188th Rescue Squadron in February 2012

=== Assignments ===
- 404th Bombardment Group (later 404th Fighter-Bomber Group, 404th Fighter Group), 4 February 1943 – 9 November 1945
- New Mexico National Guard, 7 July 1947
- 137th Fighter Group, c. September 1947
- New Mexico Air National Guard, 1 November 1950
- Fourteenth Air Force, 1 February 1951
- 1st Fighter-Interceptor Wing, 10 February 1951
- 4705th Defense Wing, 6 February 1952
- 27th Air Division, 1 March 1952 – 1 November 1952
- 140th Fighter-Bomber Group (later 140th Fighter-Interceptor Group), 1 January 1953
- 150th Fighter Group (Air Defense) (later 150th Tactical Fighter Group), 1 July 1957
- 31st Tactical Fighter Wing, 7 June 1968
- 150th Tactical Fighter Group (later 150th Fighter Group), 18 May 1969
- 150th Operations Group, 1 October 1995 – present

=== Stations ===
- Key Field, Mississippi, 4 February 1943
- Congaree Army Air Field, South Carolina, 5 July 1943
- Pollock Army Air Field, Louisiana, 15 September 1943
- Myrtle Beach Army Air Field, South Carolina, 4 November 1943 – 13 March 1944
- RAF Winkton (AAF-414), England, 5 April 1944
- Chippelle Airfield (A-5), France, 6 July 1944
- Bretigny Airfield (A-48), France, 28 August 1944
- Juvincourt Airfield (A-68), France, 17 September 1944
- Sint-Truiden Airfield (A-92), Belgium, 1 October 1944
- Kelz Airfield, Germany (Y-32), 3 April 1945
- Fritzlar Airfield (Y-86), Germany, 13 April 1945
- AAF Station Stuttgart/Echterdingen (R-50), Germany, 23 June–August 1945
- Drew Field, Florida, 11 September–9 November 1945
- Kirtland Field (later Kirtland Air Force Base), New Mexico, 7 July 1947
- Long Beach Municipal Airport, California, 17 May 1951 – 1 November 1952
- Kirtland Air Force Base, New Mexico, 1 January 1953 – Present
- Tuy Hoa Air Base, South Vietnam, 7 June 1968
- Kirtland Air Force Base, New Mexico, 18 May 1969 – present

==== New Mexico Air National Guard deployments ====
- Operation Deliberate Force

Attached to: 31st Operations Group
Operated as: 188th Fighter Squadron (Provisional)
Operated from: Aviano Air Base, Italy, February – June 1995

- Operation Southern Watch

Operated from Ahmad al-Jaber Air Base, Kuwait, April – July 1998

- Operation Northern Watch

Incirlik Air Base, Turkey, March – June 2001

- Operation Enduring Freedom

Bagram Air Base, Afghanistan, February – May 2002

- Operation Iraqi Freedom

Balad Air Base, Iraq, May – September 2004
Balad Air Base, Iraq, 29 October – December 2007

=== Aircraft ===
- Douglas A-24 Dauntless, 1943–1944
- Bell P-39 Airacobra, 1943–1944
- Republic P-47 Thunderbolt, 1944–1945
- Douglas A-26 Invader (later B-26), 1947–1951
- North American P-51D Mustang (later F-51), 1947–1951, 1951–1952, 1953
- North American F-86 Sabre, 1951
- Lockheed F-80C Shooting Star, 1953–1958
- North American F-100A Super Sabre, 1958–1964
- North American F-100C Super Sabre, 1964–1973
- North American F-100F Super Sabre, 1964–1973
- LTV A-7D Corsair II, 1973–+1992
- LTV A-7K Corsair II, 1977–+1992
- General Dynamics F-16C Fighting Falcon, 1992–2010
- General Dynamics F-16D Fighting Falcon, 1992–2010
- Sikorsky HH-60G Pave Hawk, 2012–present
- Lockheed HC-130J Combat King II, 2012–present
- Bell Boeing CV-22B Osprey, 2014–2023
