= 137th Special Operations Group =

Oklahoma Air National Guard unit

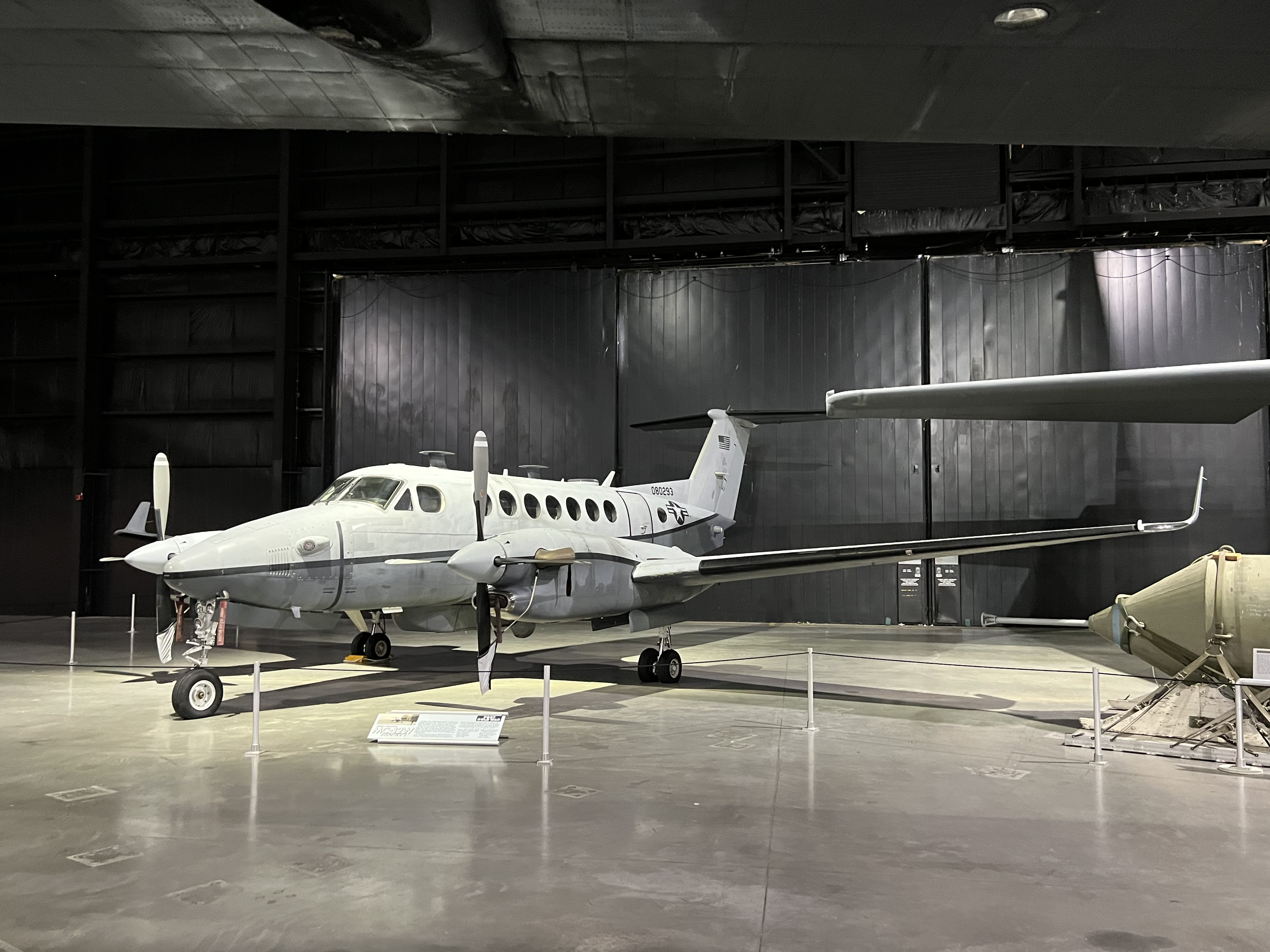
- MC-12W Liberty as flown by the squadron (Note: Aircraft is Beechcraft MC-12W-BH Liberty, serial 08-0293 in May 2022)
- Active: 1943–1945; 1947–1952; 1952–1975; 1992–present
- Country: United States
- Allegiance: Oklahoma
- Branch: Air National Guard
- Role: Special Operations
- Part of: Oklahoma Air National Guard
- Garrison/HQ: Will Rogers Air National Guard Base, Oklahoma
- Mottos: Tontrinus e Caelo (Latin for 'Thunder from the Sky') (Note: Motto originally in Latin, later in English) (1952-present); Igne Ferroque Hostem Armatum Contere (Latin for 'With Fire and Steel Crush the Armored Foe') (1943-1945); Eis Infirnum Damus (Latin for 'We Give Them Hell') (1942-1943)
- Engagements: European Theater of Operations
- Decorations: Distinguished Unit Citation; Air Force Outstanding Unit Award; French Croix de Guerre with Palm; Belgian Fourragere

Commanders
- Notable commanders: Maj Gen Stanley F.H. Newman

Insignia
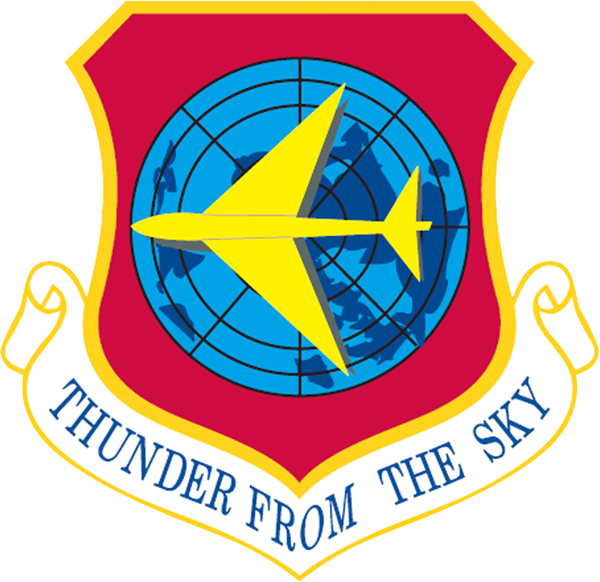
- 137th Special Operations Wing emblem (Note: While assigned to the 137th Wing, the group uses the wing emblem with the group designation on the scroll. AF Instruction 84-105, Organizational Lineage, Honors and History, 27 April 2017, paragraph 3.3.3.)

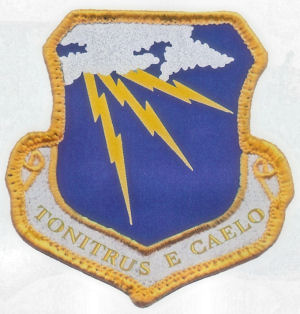
- 137th Fighter-Bomber Wing emblem (Note: Approved 6 June 1952. Description: Azure, three lightning bolts or, issuing from a cloud, proper, in dexter chief all within a diminutive bordure, gules.)

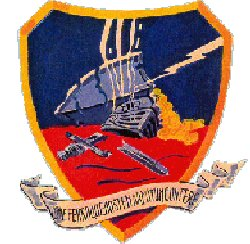
- 404th Fighter-Bomber Group emblem

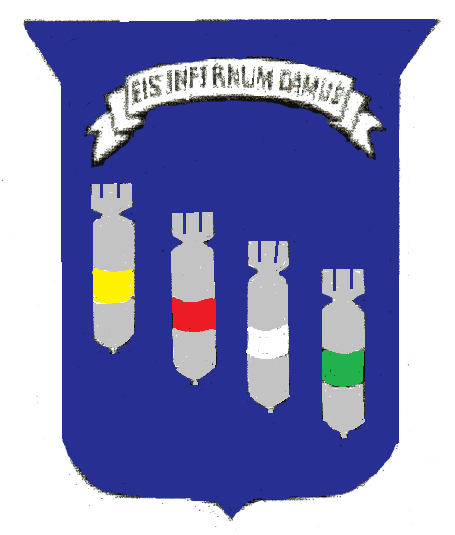
- 404th Bombardment Group emblem
- Tail Marking: Blue tail stripe "Tinker" in yellow

Aircraft flown
- Fighter: F-51, F-80, F-84, F-86
- Transport: C-97, C-124, C-130
- Tanker: KC-135

The 137th Special Operations Group is an associate unit of the Oklahoma Air National Guard stationed at Will Rogers Air National Guard Base. If activated for federal service, the group is gained by Air Force Special Operations Command.

The group was first activated during World War II as the 404th Fighter Group flying Republic P-47 Thunderbolts. The group served in the European Theater of Operations from May 1944 until the end of the war. It provided close air support to ground troops following Operation Overlord, the Normandy landings. It earned a Distinguished Unit Citation, French Croix de Guerre with Palm and Belgian Fourragere before inactivating in the fall of 1945.

The group was redesignated the 137th Fighter Group and allotted to the National Guard in 1946, with squadrons in Oklahoma and Kansas. During the Korean War, it was activated and deployed to France as the 137th Fighter-Bomber Group, where it opened Chaumont Air Base.

The unit was replaced in France by a regular unit and returned without personnel or equipment to state control. In 1955, it converted from the fighter bomber to the fighter interceptor mission, and two years later lost its squadrons in Tulsa and in Kansas to new fighter groups.

From 1961 until it was inactivated in 1975, the group engaged in strategic and tactical airlift.

The group was activated again in 1992 and converted to the air refueling mission in 2008.

== Units ==
The 137th Special Operations Group consists of the following units:

- 137th Aeromedical Evacuation Squadron
- 137th Special Operations Support Squadron
- 185th Special Operations Squadron
- 189th Intelligence Squadron
- 285th Special Operations Intelligence Squadron
- 138th Combat Training Flight

== History ==
=== World War II ===
==== Training in the United States ====
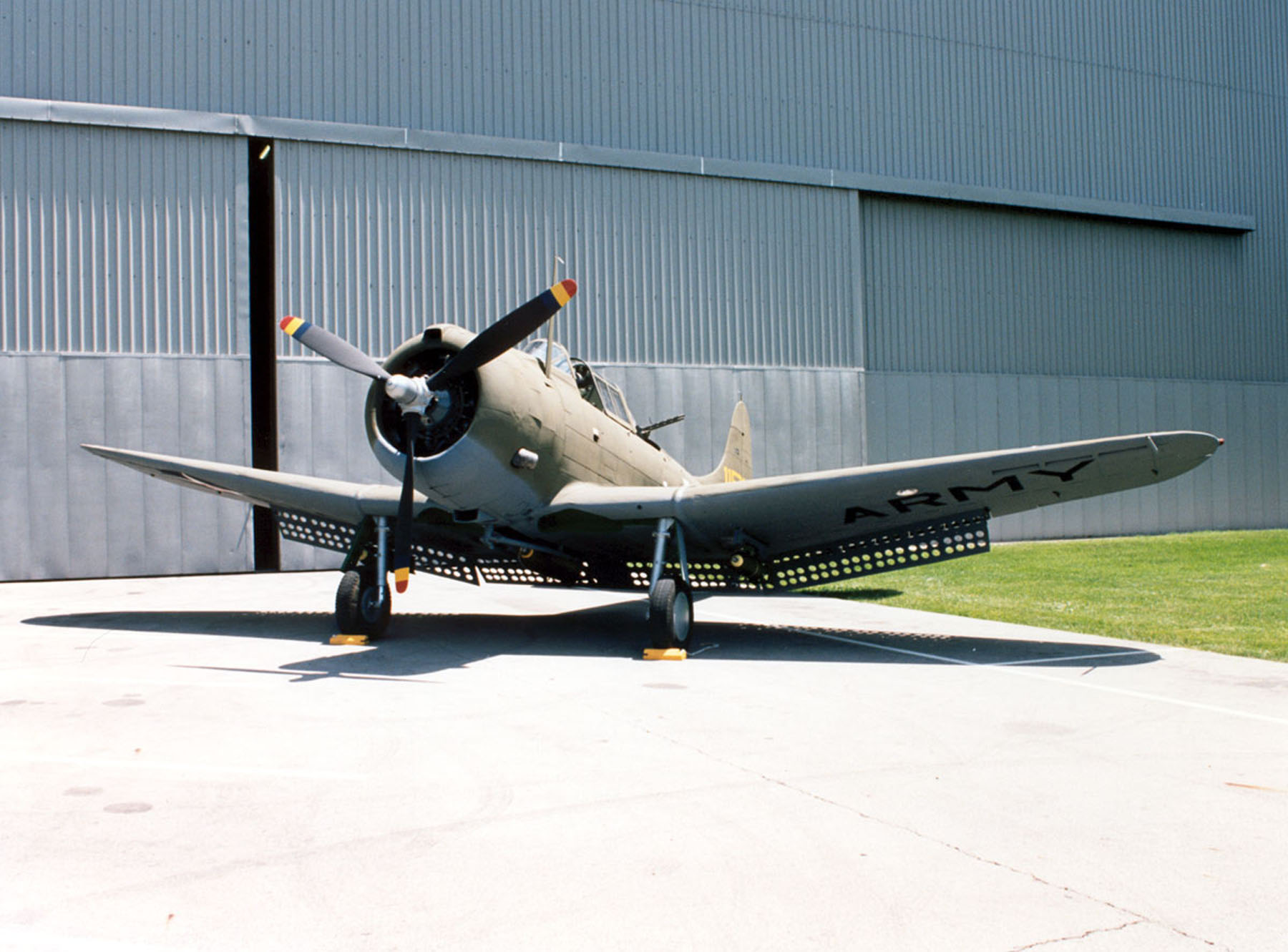
A-24 showing its dive brakes

The group was first activated at Key Field, Mississippi as the 404th Bombardment Group (Dive) with the 620th, 621st, 622d Bombardment Squadron and 623d Bombardment Squadrons assigned. The group drew its initial cadre from the 48th Bombardment Group, and was equipped with a mix of Vultee A-35 Vengeance and Douglas A-24 Banshee dive bombers and (briefly) Bell P-39 Airacobra fighter-bombers. In July, the group moved to Congaree Army Air Field, South Carolina, where, along with all other single engine dive bomber units of the Army Air Forces, it reorganized in August, becoming the 405th Fighter-Bomber Group. Fighter groups were organized with three squadrons, rather than the four of bombardment groups, so the 623d Squadron was disbanded.

Between November 1943 and January 1944, most of the aircrew assigned to the group were detached for training on fighter aircraft and replaced by fighter qualified pilots, many of whom had been serving as instructors in various fighter training units. On 22 March 1944, the group departed Camp Shanks, New York for the European Theater on board the MV Stirling Castle, arriving in Liverpool on 3 April.

==== Combat in Europe ====
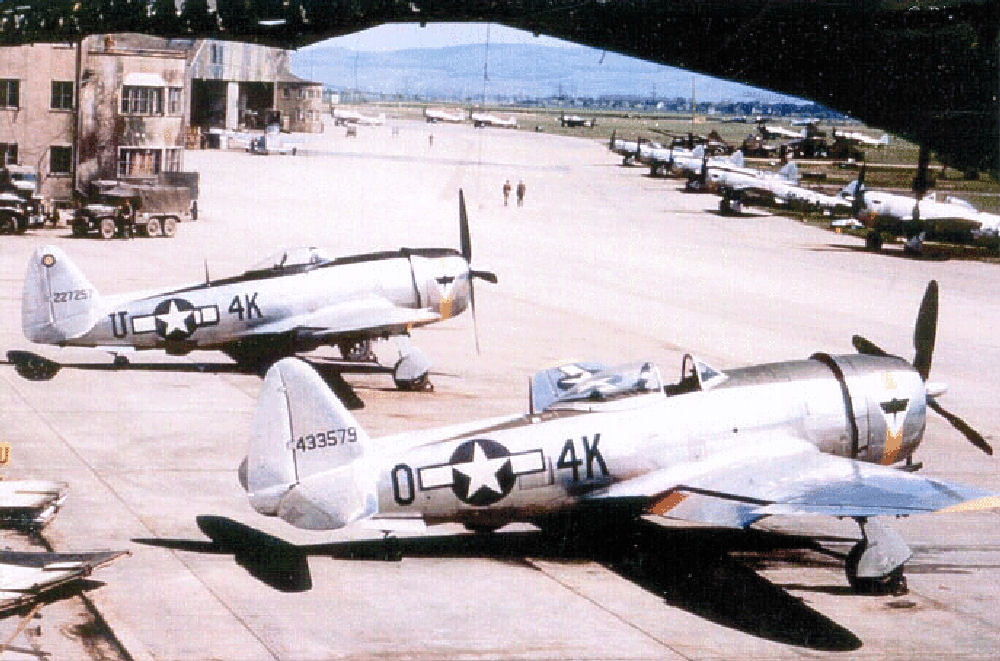
506th Fighter Squadron P-47 Thunderbolts (Note: Photo likely taken at Kelz Airfield or Fritzlar Airfield, Germany in the spring of 1945.)

Upon arrival in the European Theater of Operations the group became part of IX Fighter Command. The group's station in England was RAF Winkton, an unimproved field, where it received 75 Republic P-47 Thunderbolts by 16 April. By 1 May, it was ready to fly its first combat mission, a fighter sweep over Normandy. Later in the month, it began to fly Noball missions, strikes on V-1 flying bomb launching sites. For the rest of the month, the 404th helped prepare for Operation Overlord, the Normandy invasion by bombing and strafing targets in northern France. The group's squadrons provided top cover for landings in Normandy on 6 and 7 June 1944.

On 6 July the 404th moved across the Channel to an Advanced Landing Ground at Chippelle Airfield, France. The group also flew interdiction and escort missions, strafing and bombing such targets as troop concentrations, railroads, highways, bridges, fuel and ammunition dumps, armored vehicles, docks, and tunnels, and covering the operations of Boeing B-17 Flying Fortresses, Consolidated B-24 Liberators, and Martin B-26 Marauders that bombed factories, airdromes, marshaling yards, and other targets. On 6 and 7 June, the group provided top cover for the Normandy landings. The 404th provided close air support to ground troops, supporting the Allied breakthrough at Saint-Lô from 29 through 31 July 1944, provided continuous cover for four allied armored divisions despite severe losses. For this action the group received the French Croix de Guerre with Palm from the French government.

On 10 September 1944 the group flew three armed reconnaissance missions, attacking factories, rolling stock and communications centers despite adverse weather and heavy flak, for which it was awarded the Distinguished Unit Citation. On 28 September 1944, 2/Lt John W. Wainwright was credited with destroying six enemy aircraft on a single mission, three of which were knocked down in a midair collision during a dogfight.

The 404th provided close air support to ground troops, supporting the drive through Belgium and the Netherlands in September 1944. For its actions supporting the liberation of Belgium, the group was thrice cited in the Order of the Day by the Belgian government, earning it the Belgian Fourragere. From 21 to 25 January 1945, it attacked German armor and transportation withdrawing from the Battle of the Bulge, and claimed to have destroyed or damaged over 1000 enemy vehicles.

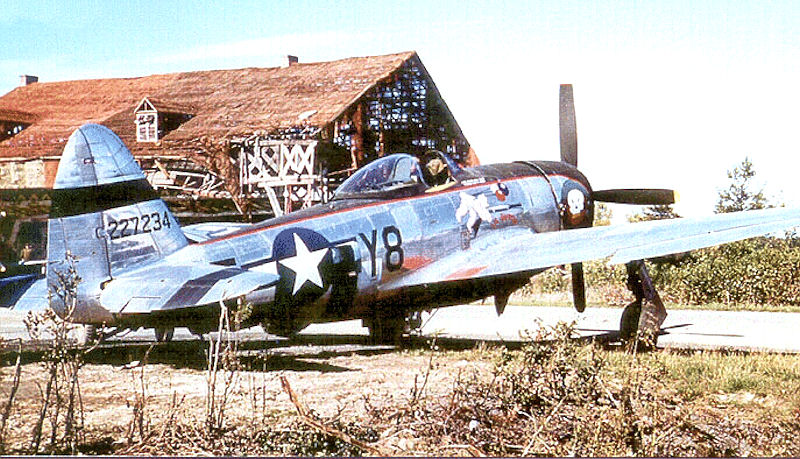
507th Fighter Squadron P-47 at Fritzlar Airfield (Note: Aircraft is Republic P-47D Thunderbolt serial 42-27234 at Fritzlar Airfield, Germany, April 1945.)

During February 1945, it assisted with the reduction of German forces west of the Rhine and the widening of the Remagen bridgehead east of the Rhine during March 1945. When the war in Europe ended, the group assisted with the disarming of the Luftwaffe and dismantling of the German aircraft industry

Following its return to the United States, the unit was reassigned to the Third Air Force in the United States and prepared for deployment to Okinawa to take part in planned Invasion of Japan. When the Atomic bombings of Hiroshima and Nagasaki took place and the Pacific War suddenly ended, these plans were canceled. Most personnel either separated from the military or were reassigned to other units, while a skeleton staff arrived at Drew Field, Florida on 1 September. The unit was inactivated on 9 November 1945.

=== Oklahoma Air National Guard ===
The 404th Fighter-Bomber Group was redesignated as the 137th Fighter Group and allotted to the National Guard on 24 May 1946. It was organized at Westheimer Airport, Norman, Oklahoma and was extended federal recognition on 18 December 1947. It was assigned to the Tenth Air Force of Air Defense Command.

The 137th Fighter Group was assigned the 185th Fighter Squadron at Westheimer, the 125th Fighter Squadron at Tulsa Municipal Airport and the 127th Fighter Squadron at Wichita Municipal Airport, Kansas as its operational units, all equipped with North American F-51D Mustang fighters. The Group's mission was air defense.

In April 1949, a tornado struck the Westheimer. The damage was considered too extensive for economical repair and the decision was made to move the 137th Fighter Group and its 185th Fighter Squadron to Will Rogers World Airport in Oklahoma City in an area used as an Army Air Forces station during World War II. The move was accomplished on 6 September 1949. In 1950 the 125th traded its old Mustangs for Republic F-84 Thunderjets.

==== Korean War federalization ====
The 137th was federalized on 10 October 1950 due to the Korean War. The group was assigned to Tactical Air Command, and redesignated 137th Fighter-Bomber Group. Under the wing base organization, the 137th Fighter-Bomber Wing was activated and the group was assigned to it. The 125th and 127th Fighter Squadrons (flying different models of the F-84) were activated with the group, while the 128th Fighter Squadron of the Georgia Air National Guard, with P-47s, took the place of the 185th Fighter Squadron, which remained under state control until the following year. The 137th was programmed to reinforce United States Air Forces Europe (USAFE) at Chaumont Air Base, France once the wing initially programmed to be stationed there. the 136th Fighter-Bomber Wing, was diverted to Korea. However, it was August 1951 before France gave permission to establish an "interim tent camp" at Chaumont, which had runways built in 1944 and a limited parking area.

By 27 November, the group's squadrons assembled at Alexandria Air Force Base, Louisiana, for conversion training in newer F-84G Thunderjets. The need to transfer pilots and support personnel to Korea and delays in deliveries of the group's F-84Gs required the complete training cycle to be repeated twice and the group did not complete its transition to the G model of the Thunderject until February 1952. While at Alexandria, the group's pilots participated in USAF Project 7109, which sent them temporarily to Far East Air Forces, where they acquired actual combat experience before returning to the States. Due to the delays, most of the activated National Guard airmen remained behind when the group deployed to Europs and were released from active duty without shipping overseas.

With mostly regular Air Force personnel and all the delays behind them, the group's planes departed Louisiana on 5 May 1952 for Europe. The air echelon ferried brand new F-84Gs across the Atlantic. The ground echelon sailed from New Orleans on the USNS General Alexander M. Patch on 13 May. The 137th's aircraft diverted at the last moment to Landstuhl Air Base and Neubiberg Air Base in West Germany arriving on 13 May. The official explanation for this change was that repairs to the Chaumont runway were needed, but the F-84G was capable of carrying nuclear weapons, which were opposed by some French political parties and it was not until 25 June that the French government permitted the group to move to Chaumont. It was first USAF fighter group to be based permanently in France (and the only F-84G unit). The 137th ended its active-duty tour in France two weeks later in July 1952 and its mission, personnel and equipment were transferred to the 48th Fighter Group, which was simultaneously activated.

==== Fighter-Interceptor mission ====
Reforming after their active duty service, the group was reformed with both the 125th and 185th squadrons being released from Federal Service and being reassigned by 1 January 1953. The 137th was gained by Tactical Air Command (TAC), and the squadrons were again equipped with Mustangs again, due to the shortage of jet aircraft in the United States (almost all were in Korea). In the spring of 1953 they received reworked F-80A Shooting Star aircraft, brought up to F-80C standards.

In 1955 the group became the 137th Fighter-Interceptor Group and was given a fighter-interceptor mission in Air Defense Command (ADC). On 1 August 1957 the 137th Wing reorganized to mirror ADC's active duty organization as the 137th Air Defense Wing, while at each location with a subordinate squadron became a Fighter Group (Air Defense), adding support units to the fighter squadron at the location.

The 137th was equipped with North American F-86D Sabres in 1958. Their F-80s were transferred to the Federal Aviation Administration (FAA) for various experimental testing activities. The group also assumed ADC runway alert program on a 24-hour basis. In June 1959 the squadron traded their F-86Ds for the upgraded F-86L Sabre with uprated engines and new electronics.

==== Strategic airlift ====
In April 1961, Military Air Transport Service became the gaining command for the 137th, trading in its Sabres for Boeing C-97 Stratofreighter transports. The unit was redesignated the 137th Air Transport Group. Throughout the 1960s, the 125th flew long-distance transport missions in support of Air Force requirements, frequently sending aircraft to the Caribbean, Europe, Australia, Hawaii, Japan and the Philippines. During the Berlin Crisis of 1961, the group flew missions to Europe, although it was not called to active duty as a unit. It flew missions to the Dominican Republic during the Dominican Civil War there in 1965 and with the increasing American involvement also began flying missions to Southeast Asia.

Part of the 137th Air Transport Group mission was a specially equipped C-97E, 51-0224, the "Miss Oklahoma City" also known as the "Talking Bird". From 1961 though 1963 the aircraft was used as an airborne command post to maintain constant secure communications between the nation's capital and President John F. Kennedy during his visits to foreign countries. The C-97s were retired in February 1968 replaced by Douglas C-124C Globemaster II transports.

==== Tactical airlift ====
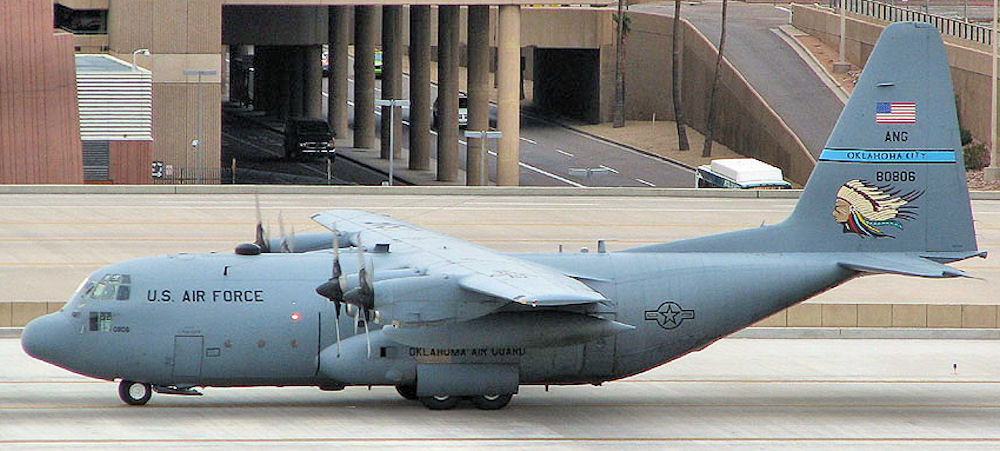
185th Airlift Squadron C-130 (Note: 185th Airlift Squadron Lockheed C-130H, serial 78-806 in 2000, wearing the then new gray paint scheme.)

In 1975 the group became the 137th Tactical Airlift Wing and re-equipped with Lockheed C-130A Hercules tactical airlifters. It was inactivated in February 1975 and its units assigned directly to the 137th Tactical Airlift Wing.

In subsequent years the 137th served in humanitarian missions worldwide. During the 1990s the 185th provided Counter-drug support coordinated through the Oklahoma Bureau of Narcotics and Dangerous Drugs. As of mid-2001, numerous drug enforcement operations have resulted in the destruction of 7.2 million marijuana plants, estimated 4.1 billion dollars in destroyed drugs, 814 arrests, 165 seized weapons, and 1.1 million dollars in currency and assets seized.

The 137th provided operational support during the 1991 Gulf War, and contributed logistical assistance in Bosnia in the late 1990s. Group personnel from the 137th Airlift Wing aided New Mexico ranchers faced with livestock devastation after severe winter storms covered the grasslands with snow, averting near disaster to New Mexico's livestock industry.

=== Current status ===
In its 2005 BRAC Recommendations, the Department of Defense relocating the group to Tinker Air Force Base as an associate of the 507th Operations Group of Air Force Reserve Command as the 137th Operations Group. The 137th's C-130H aircraft were distributed to the Texas Air National Guard's 136th Airlift Wing at NAS JRB Fort Worth, Texas, and the Missouri Air National Guard's 139th Airlift Wing at Rosecrans Air National Guard Base, Missouri.

From October 2008 until 2015, 137th Group aircrews jointly operated the Boeing KC-135R Stratotanker aircraft at Tinker with the aircrews of the Air Force Reserve 465th Air Refueling Squadron. The 137th Air Refueling Wing is planned to transition from Air Mobility Command claimancy as a KC-135R unit at Tinker Air Force Base, to Air Force Special Operations Command flying the MC-12W Liberty surveillance variant of the Beechcraft C-12 Huron, returning flight operations to Will Rogers Air National Guard Base at Will Rogers World Airport. The wing was planned to be renamed the 137th Special Operations Wing.

== Lineage ==
- Constituted as the 404th Bombardment Group (Dive) on 25 January 1943

Activated on 4 February 1943

- Redesignated 404th Fighter-Bomber Group on 10 August 1943
- Redesignated 404th Fighter Group, Single Engine on 30 May 1944

Inactivated on 9 November 1945

- Redesignated 137th Fighter Group, Single Engine and allotted to the National Guard

Organized on 1 September 1947
Extended federal recognition on 18 December 1947

- 10 October 1950: Federalized and ordered to active service
- Inactivated, released from active duty and returned to Oklahoma state control on 10 July 1952

Activated on 10 July 1952

- Redesignated 137th Fighter-Interceptor Group on 1 July 1955
- Redesignated 137th Fighter Group (Air Defense) on 1 August 1957
- Redesignated 137th Air Transport Group, Heavy on 1 April 1961
- Redesignated 137th Military Airlift Group on 1 January 1966
- Redesignated 137th Tactical Airlift Group on 10 December 1974

Inactivated on 9 February 1975

- Redesignated 137th Operations Group

Activated 16 March 1992
Redesignated '137th Special Operations Group

=== Assignments ===
- III Fighter Command, 4 February 1943
- IX Fighter Command, 4 April 1944
- 84th Fighter Wing,

Attached to: IX Tactical Air Command, 1 August 1944

- XXIX Tactical Air Command, 26 October 1944
- 64th Fighter Wing, 16 January – 2 August 1945
- III Fighter Command, 1 September – 9 November 1945
- 71st Fighter Wing, 18 December 1947
- 63d Fighter Wing, 23 May 1948
- 137th Fighter-Bomber Wing, 26 October 1950 – 10 July 1952
- 137th Fighter-Bomber Wing (later 137th Fighter-Interceptor Wing, 137th Air Defense Wing, 137th Air Transport Wing, 137th Military Airlift Wing, 137th Tactical Airlift Wing), 10 July 1952 – 9 February 1975
- 137th Airlift Wing (later 137th Air Refueling Wing), 16 March 1992 – 30 September 2015
- 137th Special Operations Wing, 1 October 2015 – present

=== Components ===
==== World War II ====
- 455th Fighter Squadron: 1 December 1943 – 12 February 1944
- 620th Bombardment Squadron (later 506th Fighter-Bomber Squadron, 506th Fighter Squadron): 4 February 1943 – 9 November 1945
- 621st Bombardment Squadron (later 507th Fighter-Bomber Squadron, 507th Fighter Squadron): 4 February 1943 – 9 November 1945
- 622d Bombardment Squadron (later 508th Fighter-Bomber Squadron, 508th Fighter Squadron): 4 February 1943 – 9 November 1945
- 623d Bombardment Squadron: 4 February – 15 August 1943

==== Air National Guard ====
- 117th Fighter-Interceptor Squadron: 23 February 1957 – 10 April 1958
- 125th Fighter Squadron (later 125th Fighter-Bomber Squadron, 125th Fighter-Interceptor Squadron): 18 December 1947 – 10 July 1952, 10 July 1952 – 1 August 1957
- 127th Fighter Squadron (later 127th Fighter-Bomber Squadron, 127th Fighter-Interceptor Squadron): 1 September 1947 – 10 July 1952; 10 July 1952 – 1 August 1957
- 128th Fighter Squadron (later 128th Fighter-Bomber Squadron): 10 October 1950 – 10 July 1952
- 154th Fighter Squadron: 1 September 1947 – 10 October 1950
- 185th Fighter Squadron (later 185th Fighter-Bomber Squadron, 185th Fighter-Interceptor Squadron, 185th Air Transport Squadron, 185th Military Airlift Squadron, 185th Tactical Airlift Squadron, 185th Air Refueling) Squadron): 18 December 1947 – 10 October 1950; 1 January 1953 – 9 February 1975, 16 March 1992 – 2015 (Note: The 185th Squadron was one of the group's original squadrons, the 620th Bombardment Squadron, which had been allotted to the National Guard along with the 137th. Maurer, Combat Squadrons, p. 609.)
- 185th Special Operations Squadron: 1 October 2015 – present

=== Stations ===
- Key Field, Mississippi, 4 February 1943
- Congaree Army Air Field, South Carolina, 5 July 1943
- Burns Army Air Field, Oregon, 4 September 1943
- Myrtle Beach Army Air Field, South Carolina, 13 November 1943 – 12 March 1944
- RAF Winkton (AAF-414), England, 4 April 1944
- Chippelle Airfield (A-5), France, 6 July 1944
- Bretigny Airfield (A-48), France, 29 August 1944
- Juvincourt Airfield (A-68), France, 13 September 1944
- Sint-Truiden Airfield (A-92), Belgium, 4 October 1944
- Kelz Airfield (Y-54), Germany, 30 March 1945
- Fritzlar Airfield (Y-86), Germany, 12 April 1945
- AAF Station Stuttgart/Echterdingen (R-50), Germany, 23 June – 2 August 1945
- Drew Field, Florida, 1 September – 9 November 1945
- Westheimer Airport, Oklahoma, 18 December 1947
- Will Rogers World Airport, Oklahoma, 6 September 1949
- Alexandria Air Force Base, Louisiana, 27 November 1950 – 4 May 1952
- Chaumont-Semoutiers Air Base, France, 13 May 1952 – 10 July 1952
- Will Rogers World Airport, Oklahoma, 10 July 1952
- Will Rogers World Airport, Oklahoma, 16 March 1992
- Tinker Air Force Base, Oklahoma, 1 October 2008 – 30 September 2015
- Will Rogers Air National Guard Base, Oklahoma, 1 October 2015 – present

=== Aircraft ===
- Vultee A-35 Vengeance (1943)
- Douglas A-24 Banshee (1943)
- Bell P-39 Airacobra (1943)
- Republic P-47 Thunderbolt (1944–1945)
- North American F-51D Mustang, 1947–1951, 1953
- RF-51D Mustang, 1951–1952
- Lockheed RF-80A Shooting Star, 1952–1953
- Lockheed F-80C Shooting Star, 1953–1958
- North American F-86D Sabre, 1958–1959
- North American F-86L Sabre, 1959–1961
- Boeing C-97C Stratofreighter, 1961–1963
- Boeing C-97G Stratofreighter, 1961–1968
- Douglas C-124C Globemaster II, 1968–1975
- Lockheed C-130A Hercules, 1975–1979
- Lockeed C-130H Hercules, 1979–2008
- Boeing KC-135R Stratotanker, 2008 – 2015
- Beechcraft MC-12W, 2015 – present

=== Awards and campaigns ===
| Award streamer | Award | Dates | Notes |
|---|---|---|---|
| | Distinguished Unit Citation | 10 September 1944 Germany | 404th Fighter Group |
| | Air Force Outstanding Unit Award | | 137th Special Operations Group |
| | French Croix de Guerre with Palm | 29 July 1944-31 July 1944 | 404th Fighter Group |
| | Belgian Fourragere | 6 June 1944-15 January 1945 | 404th Fighter Group |

| Campaign Streamer | Campaign | Dates | Notes |
|---|---|---|---|
| | American Theater without inscription | 4 February 1943 – 12 March 1944 | 404th Fighter Group |
| | Air Offensive, Europe | 4 April 1944 – 5 June 1944 | 404th Fighter Group |
| | Normandy | 6 June 1944 – 24 July 1944 | 404th Fighter Group |
| | Northern France | 25 July 1944 – 14 September 1944 | 404th Fighter Group |
| | Rhineland | 15 September 1944 – 21 March 1945 | 404th Fighter Group |
| | Ardennes-Alsace | 16 December 1944 – 25 January 1945 | 404th Fighter Group |
| | Central Europe | 22 March 1944 – 21 May 1945 | 404th Fighter Group |

== See also ==
- 502d Air Service Group Support Organization for 404th Fighter Group
