= 146th Air Support Operations Squadron =

Military unit

The 146th Air Support Operations Squadron is an air support operations (air-ground liaison) squadron of the United States Air Force. The official title of the 146th ASOS is "Plains Warriors." The squadron is located at the Will Rogers Air National Guard Base in Oklahoma City, Oklahoma.

== Overview ==
The 2005 Base Realignment and Closure Commission (BRAC) recommendations began the process to redistribute the 137th Airlift Wing's eight C-130H aircraft from Will Rogers Air National Guard Base and implemented the process to stand up an Air Support Operations Squadron (ASOS); to be aligned with and provide close air support (CAS) to the 45th Infantry Brigade Combat Team of the Oklahoma Army National Guard. The squadron was officially activated October 4, 2008 in a ceremony presided over by the Adjutant General of Oklahoma MG Harry M. Wyatt III with Lt. Col. Bruce Hamilton as the first commander. He was succeeded by Lt. Col. James B. Waltermire.

Members of the unit were deployed to Afghanistan in 2011.
