= RAF Winkton =

Former Royal Air Force Advanced Landing Ground in Dorset, England

RAF Winkton USAAF Station AAF-414
- Near Bransgore, Hampshire in England
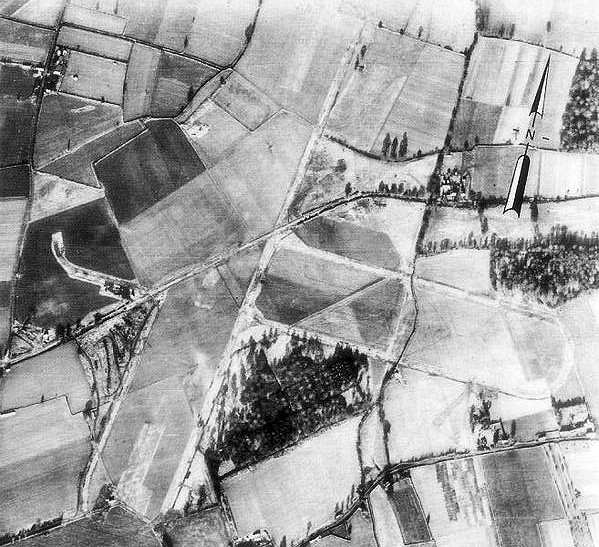
- Winkton Airfield aerial of January 1947, the airfield having closed in July 1944. The outlines of the pierced steel planking perimeter track are still evident on the land, with it being returned to agricultural use.

Site information
- Type: RAF Advanced landing ground
- Code: XT
- Owner: Air Ministry
- Operator: Royal Air Force; United States Army Air Forces
- Controlled by: RAF Fighter Command * No. 11 Group RAF; Ninth Air Force

Location
- Shown within Hampshire RAF Winkton (the United Kingdom)
- Coordinates: 50°46′37″N 001°46′2″W

Site history
- Built: 1943/44
- Built by: 5005 Airfield Construction Squadron RAF
- In use: March 1944 - January 1945
- Battles/wars: European theatre of World War II; Air Offensive, Europe July 1942 - May 1945

Airfield information
- Elevation: 12 metres (39 ft) AMSL
Runways
Direction	Length and surface
	Sommerfeld Tracking
	Sommerfeld Tracking

Royal Air Force Winkton, or more simply RAF Winkton, is a former Royal Air Force Advanced landing ground previously in Hampshire but now, due to County boundary changes, in Dorset, England. The airfield is located approximately 3 miles (4.8 km) north of Christchurch; and is named after the nearby hamlet of Winkton.

Although complete by September 1943 Winkton opened in March 1944 with Sommerfeld Mesh runways and pierced steel planking perimeter tracks, and was the prototype for the type of temporary Advanced Landing Ground type airfield that would be built in France after D-Day, when the need for advanced landing fields would become urgent as the Allied forces moved east across France and Germany. It was used by British and the United States Army Air Forces. It was closed in July 1944, when the mesh runways were lifted for use on the Continent, and immediately returned to agriculture.

Today the airfield is a mixture of agricultural fields with no recognizable remains.

== History ==
=== USAAF use ===
While under USAAF control, Winkton was known as USAAF Station AAF-414 for security reasons, and by which it was referred to instead of location. Its Station-ID was "WT", Radio-Callsign "Drainsink"

==== 404th Fighter Group ====
RAF Winkton saw the arrival of the USAAF 404th Fighter Group on 4 April 1944, the group arriving from Myrtle Beach AAF, South Carolina. The 404th had the following operational squadrons:

- 506th Fighter Squadron (4K)
- 507th Fighter Squadron (Y8)
- 508th Fighter Squadron (7J)

The 404th was a group of Ninth Air Force's 84th Fighter Wing, IX Tactical Air Command. It flew the Republic P-47 Thunderbolt. On 6 July the 404th moved across the Channel to its Advanced Landing Ground at Chippelle (ALG A-5), France.

== Current use ==
With the Americans moving to France, Winkton airfield was closed down and returned to agricultural use in July 1944. In January 1945, the airfield was officially closed. Today, the land is unrecognizable as a former airfield, and can only be located by comparing the road network on aerial photographs taken when the airfield was active to the current network.

In 2009, there exists a private grass runway owned by Mr.I.C.Reid, who hangars his Tiger Moth biplane there.

== See also ==
- List of former Royal Air Force stations
