= 137th Special Operations Wing =

Oklahoma Air National Guard unit

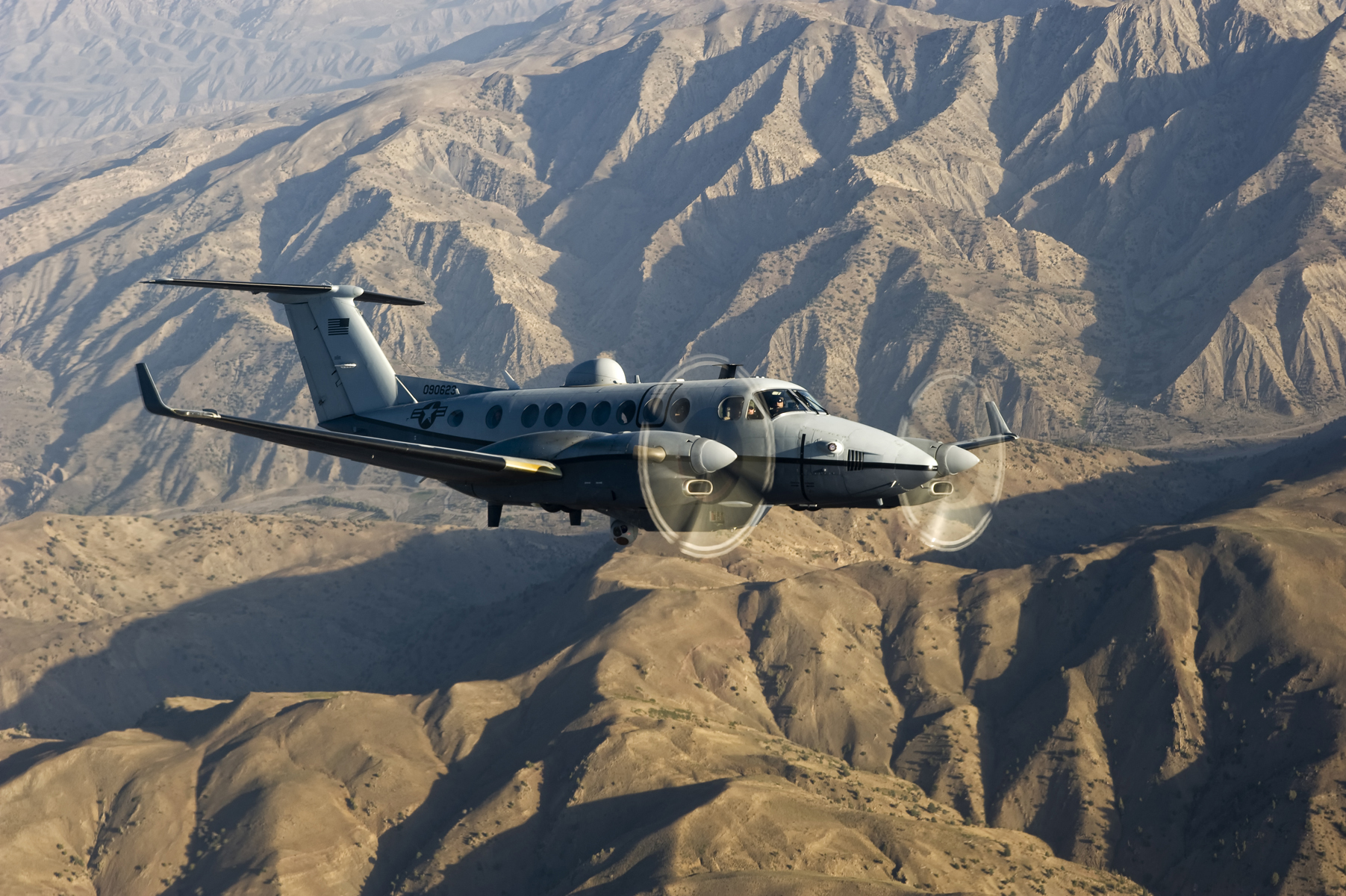
- 137th Special Operations Wing MC-12W 09-623 in flight
- Active: 1950–1952; 1952–Present
- Country: United States
- Allegiance: Oklahoma
- Branch: Air National Guard
- Type: Wing
- Role: Special Operations
- Part of: Oklahoma Air National Guard
- Garrison/HQ: Will Rogers Air National Guard Base, Oklahoma.
- Nickname: Sooners
- Mottos: Tonitrus e Caelo, (then) Thunder from the Sky

Commanders
- Commander: Colonel Shelby L. Dreyer
- Deputy Commander: Colonel R. Keith Blount
- Command Chief Master Sergeant: CCM Lawrence M. DeSalle
- Notable commanders: Maj Gen Stanley F.H. Newman

Insignia
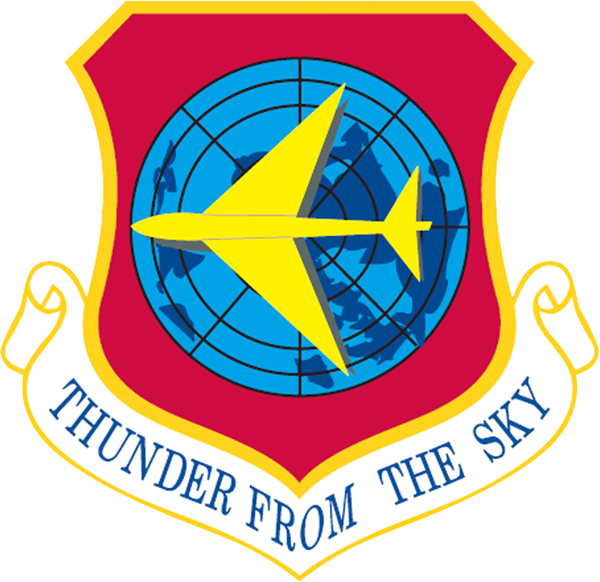
- 137th Special Operations Wing emblem

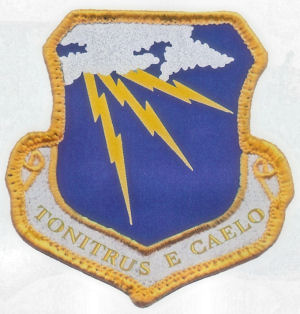
- 137th Fighter-Bomber Wing emblem (Approved 6 June 1952)
- Tail Marking: Blue tail stripe "Oklahoma City" in black

Aircraft flown
- Fighter: P/F-51, F-80, F-84, F-86
- Reconnaissance: MC-12
- Transport: C-97, C-124, C-130
- Tanker: KC-135

The 137th Special Operations Wing is a unit of the Oklahoma Air National Guard located at Will Rogers Air National Guard Base, Oklahoma. If activated to federal service, the wing is gained by Air Force Special Operations Command. During World War II, its predecessor, the 404th Fighter Group, flying Republic P-47 Thunderbolts, provided close air support to troops following the Operation Overlord, the Normandy landing until the close of the war. The wing is entitled to the honors won by the group by temporary bestowal.

The wing was activated during the Korean War and deployed to France. The unit later engaged in strategic and tactical airlift, and air refueling before being redesignated as a special operations wing.

== Overview ==
The 137th Special Operations Wing operates the MC-12W aircraft, to provide light tactical manned intelligence, surveillance, and reconnaissance (ISR) for U.S. Special Operations Command.

In addition, the Wing supports U.S. Air Force's Air Mobility Command through the 137th Aeromedical Evacuation Squadron, which provides global medical airlift.

The Wing also supports Air Combat Command through the 146th Air Support Operations Squadron, which supplies Tactical Air Control Party (TACP) capabilities to U.S. Army Infantry Brigade Combat Teams.

== Units ==
As of April 2020 the 137th Special Operations Wing consists of the following units:

- 137th Special Operations Wing
  - 137th Special Operations Group
    - 137th Aeromedical Evacuation Squadron
    - 137th Special Operations Support Squadron
    - 146th Air Support Operations Squadron
    - 185th Special Operations Squadron
    - 189th Intelligence Squadron
    - 285th Special Operations Intelligence Squadron
    - 137th Combat Training Flight
  - 137th Special Operations Mission Support Group
    - 137th Special Operations Civil Engineering Squadron
    - 137th Special Operations Security Forces Squadron
    - 137th Special Operations Logistics Readiness Squadron
    - 137th Special Operations Force Support Squadron
    - 137th Special Operations Communications Flight
  - 137th Special Operations Medical Group
  - 137th Special Operations Comptroller Flight
- Tenant Units:
  - 205th Engineering & Installation Squadron
  - 306th Intelligence Squadron

== History ==
=== Korean War federalization ===
The 137th was activated as the 137th Fighter-Bomber Wing on 26 October 1950 during the Korean War. It was the headquarters for the federalized 137th Fighter-Bomber Group and newly formed support units under the wing base organization system. The wing was assigned to Tactical Air Command, with the 137th Air Base Group, 137th Maintenance and Supply Group and the 137th Medical Group also assigned. The 137th was programmed to reinforce USAFE and be moved to Chaumont-Semoutiers Air Base, France, one of the new air bases in France that was then under construction.

By 27 November, the wing assembled at Alexandria Municipal Airport, Louisiana, for conversion training in the newer Republic F-84 Thunderjets. Deployment of the wing was delayed, however, by the need to transfer pilots to Korea from training and delays in receiving engines for the F-84Gs, as well as the ongoing construction at Chaumont Air Base. Training and delays continued throughout 1951. Due to the delays, many of the activated National Guard airmen were released from active duty and never deployed to France.

With mostly regular Air Force personnel and all the delays behind them, the remaining Guardsmen departed Louisiana on 5 May 1952 for Europe; however, the 137th inherited a base that was little more than acres of mud where wheat fields used to be. The only hardened facilities at Chaumont were a concrete runway and a handful of tar-paper shacks. The 137th was stationed by USAFE at Neubiberg Air Base, West Germany until the facilities in France were suitable for military use. The aircraft arrived at Chaumont on 25 June, being the first USAF tactical air fighters to be based permanently in France, albeit working mostly in tents and temporary wooden buildings on their new base.

The 137th was inactivated on 10 July 1952 and its personnel, mission and equipment were transferred to the 48th Fighter-Bomber Wing, which was activated the same day at Chaumont. The wing was allotted to the Oklahoma Air National Guard, which activated it the same day at Will Rogers World Airport.

=== Oklahoma Air National Guard ===
==== Fighter-Interceptor mission ====
The 137th was gained by Tactical Air Command (TAC), and its squadrons were equipped with North American F-51D Mustangs again, due to the shortage of jet aircraft in the United States (almost all were in Korea). In the spring of 1953 they received reworked F-80A Shooting Star aircraft, brought up to F-80C standards.

In 1955 the Oklahoma Air National Guard was redesignated '137th Fighter-Interceptor Wing and given a fighter-interceptor mission with Air Defense Command (ADC) becoming its gaining command.

The 185th was designated a Fighter-Interceptor Squadron, and equipped with F-86D Sabre Interceptors. Their F-80s were transferred to the civilian Federal Aviation Administration (FAA) for various experimental testing activities. With the Fighter-Interceptor mission assignment, the 185th also assumed ADC runway alert program on full 24-hour basis. This brought the 137th into the daily combat operational program of the USAF, placing us on "the end of the runway" alongside regular USAF Air Defense Fighter Squadrons. On 1 August 1957, the squadrons of its 137th Fighter Group were expanded into groups as Fighter Groups (Air Defense) and the wing became the 137th Air Defense Wing, modeling its organization on that of ADC. In June 1959 the squadron traded their F-86Ds for the upgraded F-86L Sabre Interceptor with uprated afterburning engines and new electronics.

==== Strategic airlift ====
In April 1961, the 137th was reassigned to Military Air Transport Service as the 137th Air Transport Wing, trading in its Sabre interceptors for 4-engined Boeing C-97 Stratofreighter transports. The wing augmented MATS airlift capability worldwide in support of the Air Force's needs. Throughout the 1960s, the 125th flew long-distance transport missions in support of Air Force requirements, frequently sending aircraft to the Caribbean, Europe, Australia, Hawaii, Japan, the Philippines, and during the Vietnam War, to both South Vietnam, Okinawa and Thailand. in 1966, MATS was replaced by Military Airlift Command,

Part of the 137th Wing mission was a specially equipped C-97E, 51–224, the "Miss Oklahoma City" also known as the "Talking Bird". From 1961 though 1963 the aircraft was used as an airborne command post to maintain constant secure communications between the nation's capital and President John F. Kennedy during his visits to foreign countries.

The C-97s were retired in 1968 and the wing was re-equipped with C-124C Globemaster II heavy transports. The Group continued to fly long-distance intercontinental airlift flights until the Globemasters were retired in 1975.

==== Tactical airlift ====
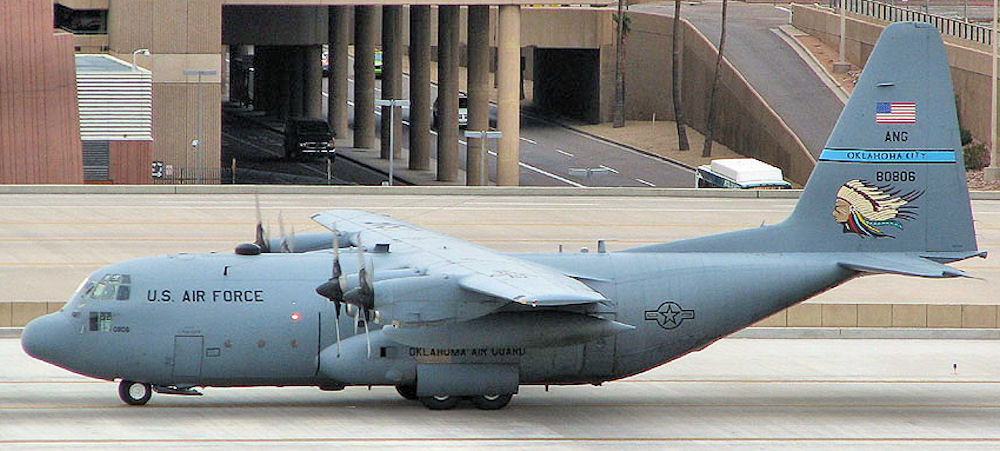
185th Airlift Squadron Lockheed C-130H, AF Ser. No. 78-0806, in 2000, wearing the new tactical grey paint scheme used by the unit

In 1975 the 137th Military Airlift Wing became the 137th Tactical Airlift Wing when it was re-equipped with the C-130A Hercules tactical airlifter. In June 1979 its 185th Tactical Airlift Squadron was the first Air National Guard unit to receive C-130H aircraft, receiving new aircraft direct from Lockheed.

In subsequent years the wing served in humanitarian missions worldwide. During the 1990s it provided Counter-drug support coordinated through the Oklahoma Bureau of Narcotics and Dangerous Drugs. As of mid-2001, numerous drug enforcement operations have resulted in the destruction of 7.2 million marijuana plants, estimated 4.1 billion dollars in destroyed drugs, 814 arrests, 165 seized weapons, and 1.1 million dollars in currency and assets seized.

Following the Oklahoma City bombing in April 1995, Air Guardsmen provided site security and medical, rescue, and recovery personnel, assisting in every aspect of the disaster rescue and recovery effort.

The 137th Airlift Wing provided operational support during the 1991 Gulf War, and contributed logistical assistance in Bosnia in the late 1990s. Personnel from the 137th Airlift Wing aided New Mexico ranchers faced with livestock devastation after severe winter storms covered the grasslands with snow. 137th aircrew delivered much needed hay to starving livestock, averting near disaster to New Mexico's livestock industry.

==== Air refueling ====
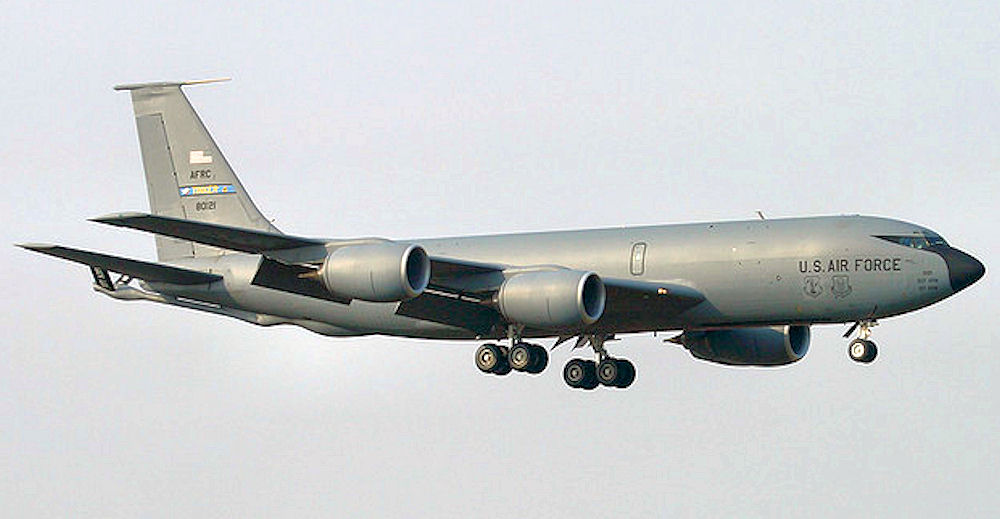

In its 2005 BRAC Recommendations, DoD recommended to realign the Will Rogers Air National Guard Station by relocating the 137th to Tinker Air Force Base and associate with the 507th Air Refueling Wing and redesignated it as the 137th Air Refueling Wing. The 137th's C-130H aircraft would be distributed to the Texas Air National Guard's 136th Airlift Wing at NAS JRB Fort Worth, TX (4 aircraft), and the Missouri Air National Guard's 139th Airlift Wing at Rosecrans Memorial Airport/Rosecrans Air National Guard Base, MO (4 aircraft). The other elements of the 137th's Expeditionary Combat Support Group would remain in place at Will Rogers Air National Guard Base.Eventually, all eight C-130s were transferred to the US Air Force Reserve's 911th Airlift Wing in Pittsburgh, PA.

Beginning in February 2007, the 185th Air Refueling Squadron aircrews jointly operated the KC-135R Stratotanker aircraft at Tinker AFB with the aircrews of the Air Force Reserve 465th Air Refueling Squadron. In February 2008, the 137th Maintenance Group relocated to Tinker AFB and the two wings combined to maintain and operate 12 KC-135 Stratotankers until September 2014. Under this first ever association between the Air Force Reserves and the Air National Guard, the 507th Air Refueling Wing retained ownership of the aircraft and served as the "Host" in the association.

=== Current status ===
As a result of the National Defense Authorization Act 2015, the 137th Air Refueling Wing was programmed to transition from Air Mobility Command claimancy as a KC-135R unit at Tinker AFB, to Air Force Special Operations Command claimancy as a MC-12W unit, returning flight operations to Will Rogers Air National Guard Base at Will Rogers World Airport. In August 2015, Oklahoma media reported that the wing would be renamed the 137th Special Operations Wing (137 SOW). The newly renamed wing was expected to operate and maintain 13 MC-12W aircraft in support of U.S. Special Operations ground forces around the world.

== Lineage ==
- Established as the 137th Fighter-Bomber Wing and activated on 26 October 1950
- Inactivated and allotted to the Oklahoma Air National Guard on 10 July 1952

Activated on 10 July 1952

- Redesignated 137th Fighter-Interceptor Wing on 1 July 1955
- Redesignated 137th Air Defense Wing on 1 August 1957
- Redesignated 137th Air Transport Wing, Heavy on 1 April 1961
- Redesignated 137th Military Airlift Wing on 1 January 1966
- Redesignated 137th Tactical Airlift Wing on 10 December 1974
- Redesignated 137th Airlift Wing on 16 May 1992
- Redesignated 137th Air Refueling Wing on 1 October 2008
- Redesignated 137th Special Operations Wing on 2015

=== Assignments ===
- Tactical Air Command, 26 October 1950
- Ninth Air Force, 1 January 1951
- Twelfth Air Force, 1 June 1952
- Oklahoma Air National Guard, 10 July 1952 – Present

Gained by Air Defense Command, 1 January 1960
Gained by Military Air Transport Service, 1 April 1961
Gained by Military Airlift Command, 1 January 1966
Gained by Air Mobility Command, 1 June 1992
Gained by Air Combat Command, 1 October 1993
Gained by Air Mobility Command, 1 April 1997
Gained by Air Force Special Operations Command, 1 September 2016

=== Components ===
- 137th Fighter-Bomber Group (later 137th Fighter-Interceptor Group, 137th Fighter Group (Air Defense), 137th Air Transport Group, 137th Military Airlift Group, 137th Tactical Airlift Group, 137th Operations Group), 10 July 1952 – 16 May 1992 – Present
- 125th Fighter (later Fighter-Bomber, Fighter-Interceptor) Squadron, 18 December 1947 – 31 July 1957
- 185th Fighter (later Fighter-Bomber, Fighter-Interceptor, Air Transport, Military Airlift, Tactical Airlift, Air Refueling Squadron, Special Operations Squadron), 18 December 1947 – 26 October 1950; 10 July 1952 – Present
- 127th Fighter (later Fighter-Bomber) Squadron, 26 October 1950 – 10 July 1952 (Korean War Kansas ANG)
- 128th Fighter (later Fighter-Bomber) Squadron, 26 October 1950 – 10 July 1952 (Korean War Georgia ANG)

=== Stations ===
- Will Rogers World Airport, Oklahoma, 26 October 1950
- Alexandria Air Force Base, Louisiana, 27 November 1950 – 4 May 1952

Operated from: Chaumont-Semoutiers AB, France, 13 May 1952 – 10 July 1952
Will Rogers World Airport (later Will Rogers Air National Guard Base), Oklahoma, 10 July 1952

- Tinker Air Force Base, Oklahoma, 1 October 2008 – 30 September 2014
- Will Rogers World Airport, Will Rogers Air National Guard Base, Oklahoma, 1 October 2014

=== Aircraft ===
- F-51D Mustang, 1950–1951
- RF-51D Mustang, 1951–1952
- RF-80A Shooting Star, 1952–1953
- F-51D Mustang, 1953
- F-80C Shooting Star, 1953–1958
- F-86D Sabre Interceptor, 1958–1959
- F-86L Sabre Interceptor, 1959–1961
- C-97G Stratofreighter, 1961–1968
- C-124C Globemaster II, 1968–1975
- C-130A Hercules, 1975–1979
- C-130H Hercules, 1979–2008
- KC-135R Stratotanker, 2008 – 2014
- MC-12W, 2015–present

=== Citations and decorations ===
- Air Force Outstanding Unit Award
