= Kelz Airfield =

Kelz Airfield Advanced Landing Ground (ALG) Y-54

- North Rhine-Westphalia, Germany Kelz Airfield (Germany)

Site information
- Type: Military airfield
- Controlled by: United States Army Air Forces

Location
- Coordinates: 50°45′22″N 006°36′34″E

Site history
- Built by: IX Engineering Command
- In use: March–July 1945
- Materials: Pierced Steel Planking (PSP)

Kelz Airfield is a former World War II military airfield in Germany. It was located about 2 miles north of Vettweiß (Nordrhein-Westfalen); approximately 315 miles southwest of Berlin.

The airfield was built by the United States Army Air Forces during March 1945 as a temporary Advanced Landing Ground as part of the Western Allied invasion of Germany. It was closed in July 1945 and dismantled.

== History ==
The airfield was built by the IX Engineer Command, 826th Engineer Aviation Battalion on a flat, agricultural area near the village of Kelz in the North Rhine-Westphalia. The airfield was constructed using Pierced Steel Planking, 5000' long aligned east–west (09/27). In addition, tents were erected for billeting and also for support facilities; an access road was built to the existing road infrastructure; a dump was created for supplies, ammunition, and gasoline drums, along with a drinkable water; and a minimal electrical grid for communications and station lighting was installed.

Opened on 24 March 1945, Ninth Air Force moved the P-47 Thunderbolts of the 48th Fighter Group to the field on 26 March, followed shortly by the P-47s of the 404th Fighter Group on 30 March. The Thunderbolts flew support missions, patrolling roads; strafing German military vehicles and dropping bombs on gun emplacements, anti-aircraft artillery and concentrations of German troops when spotted.

Both combat groups moved out at the end of April 1945, the airfield being used afterward for resupply and casualty evacuation. The airfield remained open until July when it was closed and dismantled. Today, the location of the former airfield a mixture of agricultural fields with little or no evidence of its existence.

== See also ==
- Advanced Landing Ground
