= Chippelle Airfield =

Chippelle à Cartigny-L’Epinay Airfield Advanced Landing Ground (ALG) A-5
- Calvados, Basse-Normandie Region, France
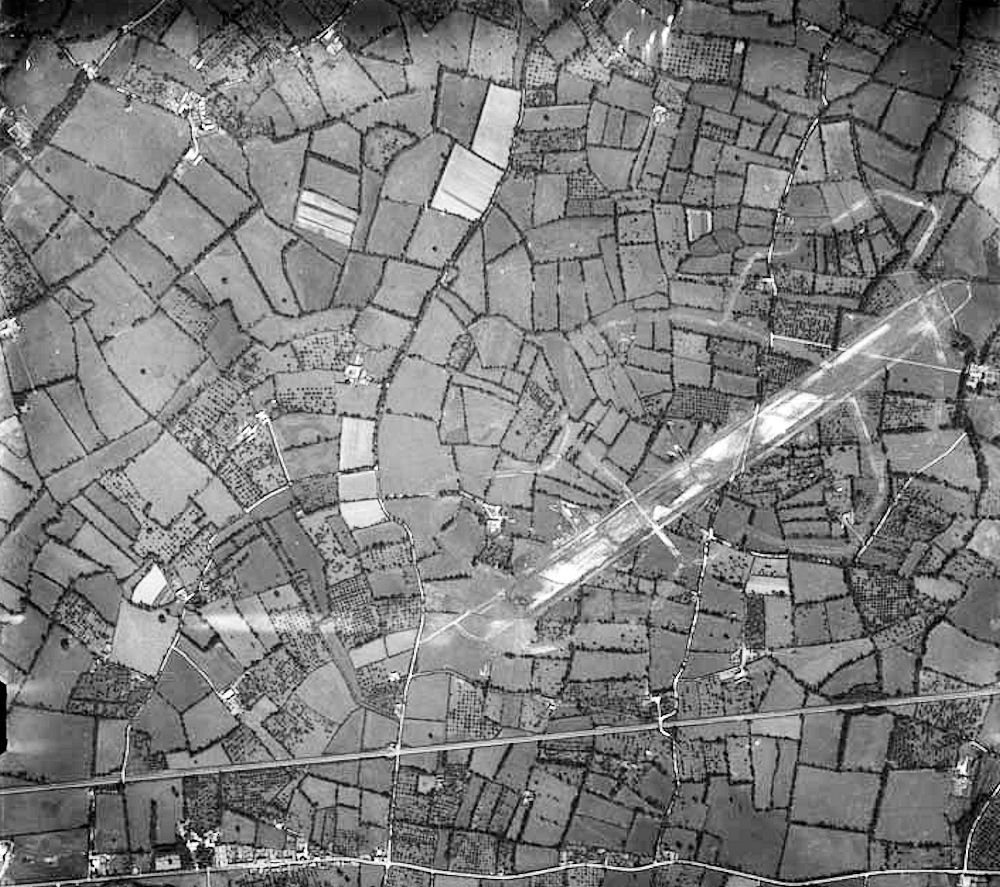
- Chippelle à Cartigny-L’Epinay Airfield (A-5), after dismantling

Site information
- Type: Military Airfield
- Controlled by: United States Army Air Forces

Location
- Coordinates: 49°14′25″N 00°58′28″W

Site history
- Built by: IX Engineering Command
- In use: June–September 1944
- Materials: Square-Mesh Track (SMT)
- Battles/wars: World War II – EAME Theater: Normandy Campaign; Northern France Campaign

Garrison information
- Garrison: Ninth Air Force
- Occupants: 404th Fighter Group

Airfield information
Runways
Direction	Length and surface
06/24	5,000 feet (1,520 m) SMT/PSP
- One runway, 4 alert pads, 50 hardstands

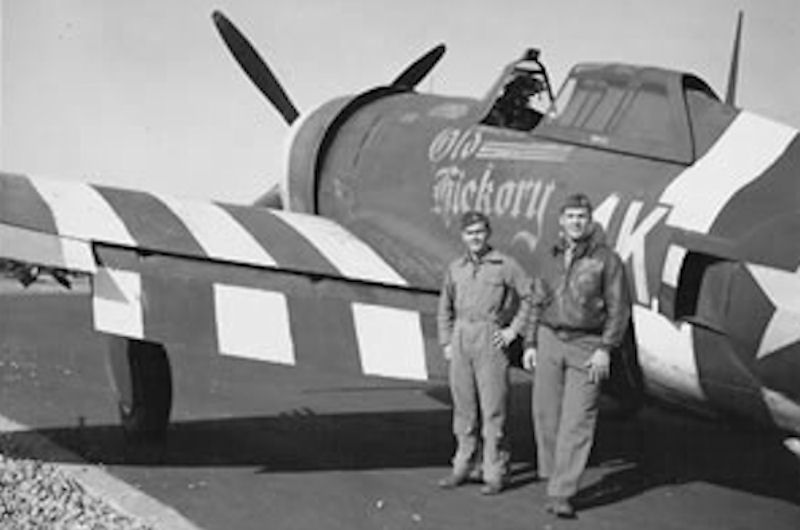
404th Fighter Group P-47D Old Hickory at Chippelle Airfield (A-5), France

Chippelle à Cartigny-L’Épinay (Chippelle) Airfield is an abandoned World War II military airfield, which is located near the commune of Cartigny-l'Épinay in the Calvados in the Normandy region of northern France.

Located just outside of Cartigny-l'Épinay, the United States Army Air Force established a temporary airfield shortly after D-Day on 16 June 1944, shortly after the Allied landings in France The airfield was one of the first established in the liberated area of Normandy, being constructed by the IX Engineering Command, 820th Engineer Aviation Battalion.

== History ==
Known as Advanced Landing Ground "A-5", the airfield consisted of a single 5000' (1500m) Square-Mesh Track runway aligned 06/24. In addition, tents were used for billeting and also for support facilities; an access road was built to the existing road infrastructure. A dump was built for supplies, ammunition, and gasoline drums, along with a drinkable water and minimal electrical grid for communications and station lighting.

On 3 July, the first P-47's of the 404th Fighter Group were permitted to land on A-5 and the airfield was declared operational two days later. The group flew support missions during the Allied invasion of Normandy, patrolling roads in front of the beachhead, strafing German military vehicles and dropping bombs on gun emplacements, anti-aircraft artillery and concentrations of German troops in Normandy and Brittany when spotted.

After the Americans moved east into Central France with the advancing Allied Armies, the airfield was left un-garrisoned and used for resupply and casualty evacuation. It was closed on 5 September 1944 and the land returned to agricultural use.

== Major units assigned ==
- 404th Fighter Group 6 July – 29 August 1944

506th (4K), 507th (Y8), 508th (7J) Fighter Squadrons (P-47D)

== Current use ==
Today the airfield is a mixture of various agricultural fields. A memorial to the men and units that were stationed at Chippelle was placed at the site of the former airfield. It is located on D 15 after the left Le Molay Littry before Épinay and turn right and follow the signs. After crossing the railroad tracks, turn immediately left. The stele is a few hundred meters to the left near a pond. NDW: Note that some map backgrounds suggest that the road along which lies the stele cross the railway track, it seems to be the case.

== See also ==
- Advanced Landing Ground
