= Rosecrans Memorial Airport =

Airport in Missouri, United States of America

Rosecrans Memorial Airport Rosecrans Army Airfield
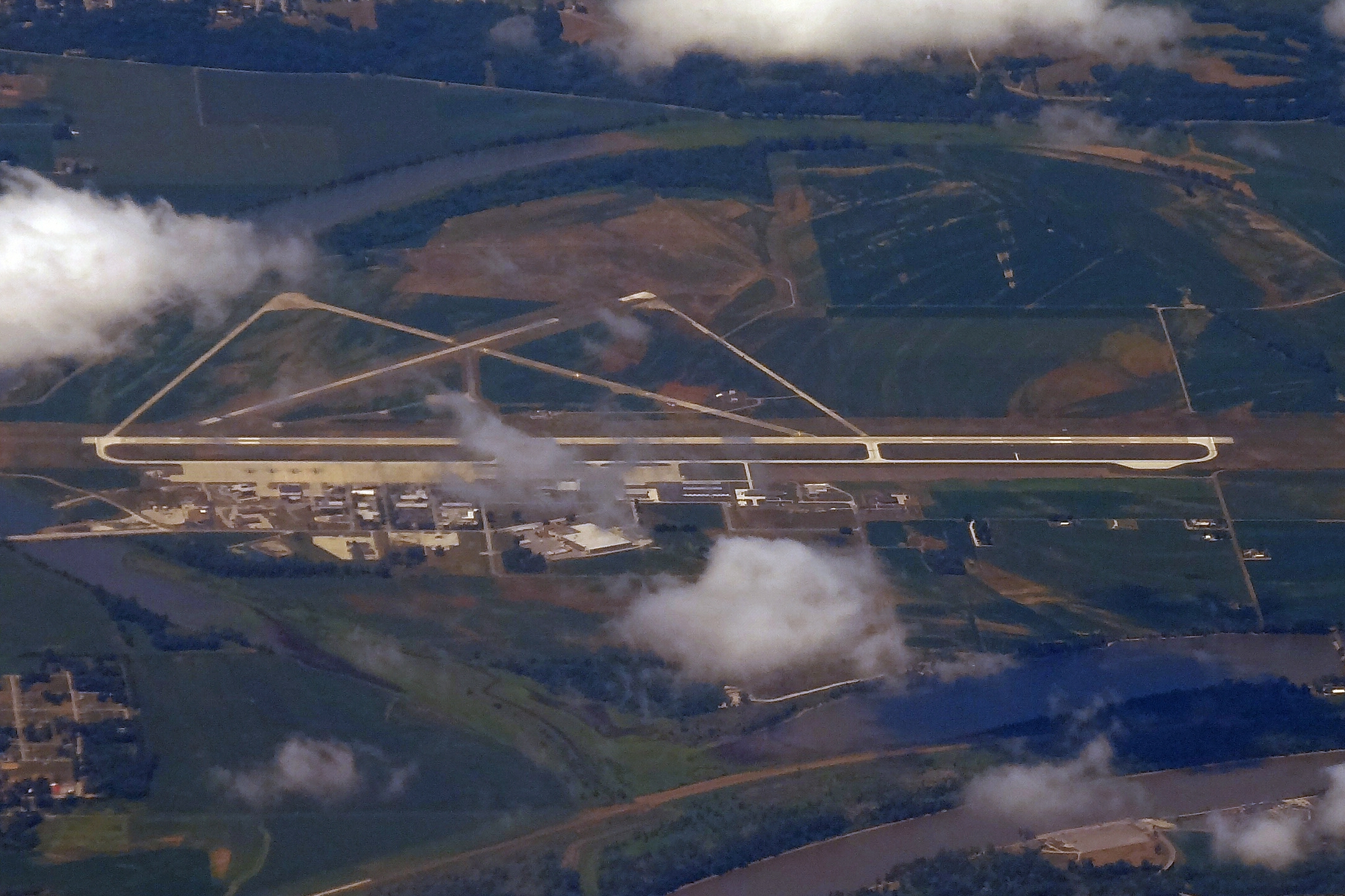
- IATA: STJ; ICAO: KSTJ; FAA LID: STJ

Summary
- Airport type: Public
- Operator: City of St. Joseph
- Location: Buchanan County, near St. Joseph, Missouri
- Elevation AMSL: 827 ft (252 m)
- Coordinates: 39°46′19″N 94°54′34.94″W

Map
- Location of Rosecrans Memorial Airport STJ (the United States)

Runways
Direction	Length		Surface
Direction	ft	m	Surface
17/35	8,061	2,457	Concrete
13/31	4,797	1,462	Concrete

Rosecrans Memorial Airport (IATA: STJ, ICAO: KSTJ, FAA LID: STJ) is a joint civil-military public airport located 3 miles (5 km) northwest of the city of St. Joseph in Buchanan County, Missouri, USA.

The airport is one of two bases for the Missouri Air National Guard and also serves general aviation. While the airport is in Missouri, there are no access roads or bridges over the Missouri River to the airport. The only access point is over Browning Bridge in Elwood, Kansas.

== History ==
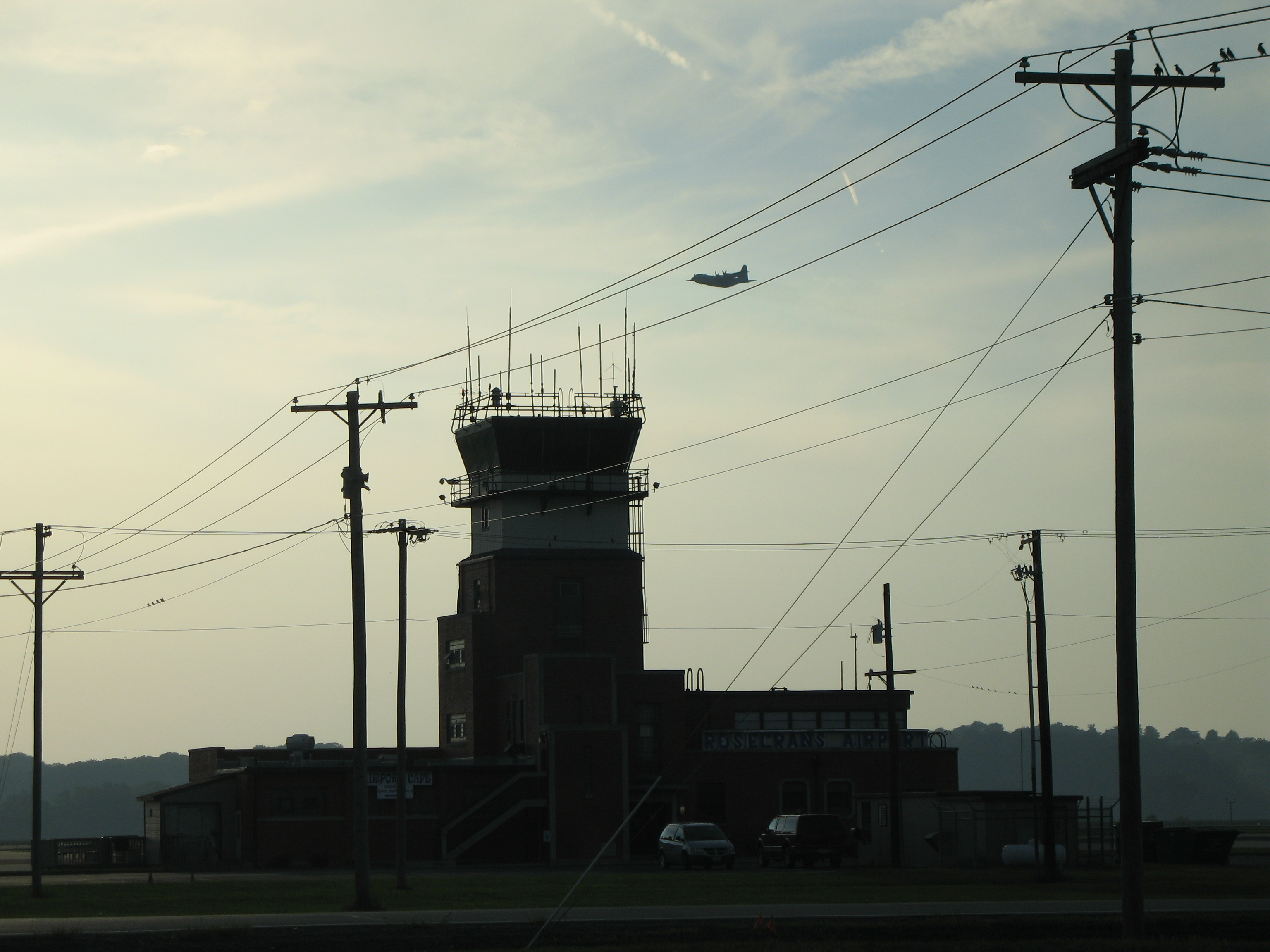
C-130H Hercules of the 139th Airlift Wing overhead Rosecrans Memorial Airport

The site of Rosecrans Memorial Airport is known as French Bottoms. It was surrounded by four towns, three of which existed as late as 1979. The northern part of the French Bottom was settled first, in the 1830s-50s, and has since washed away. The settlers were French-born and/or descendants of earlier French settlers. In 1877, most of the land that now comprises the airport was on a river bank on what was called "made land." This land had been formed by river deposits. By this year the French Bottom had sixty houses, one church, and two schools. The rich river bottom land, totaling about five thousand acres (20 km^{2}), was traditionally used for farming. Some of the descendants of the early French settlers still lived in the bottoms in 1939, when the area was razed to make way for the airport.

The airport was named in honor of Sgt. Guy Wallace Rosecrans "and comrades" of the 153rd Aero Squadron, U.S. Army Air Service, 1917–18. Rosecrans was the only St. Joseph airman killed in World War I. The new 1939 flying field was the third airport in St. Joseph to bear the name Rosecrans. In 1922, the first Rosecrans Field was opened at Lake Contrary. The second was Rosecrans Municipal Airport on the waterworks road, abandoned because of its small size and its dangerous proximity to the Missouri River bluffs to its east.

The 1939 airport was developed by the city as a municipal airport. In 1939 two three-thousand-foot (910 m) runways were built, and a hangar east of the runway intersection. During World War II the federal government established an Army Air Forces base at Rosecrans with numerous improvements being made in 1942 and 1943. The diagonal runways were doubled in length and a 5,500-foot (1,700 m) north–south runway was built, along with an aircraft parking apron and many temporary buildings, including Hangar T-1020. In 1948 much of the airfield's facilities were conveyed to the city, except for 142 acres (0.57 km^{2}) set aside for use by the Air National Guard. Airport construction during this period consisted of pump house buildings and T-hangars (1949–50) and a terminal and administration building (1951–52).

The Great Flood of 1951 damaged many of the temporary World War II airport buildings beyond economical repair. The Missouri River changed course in the flood, cutting off the airport from its land connection to St. Joseph. Today, visitors from Missouri go through Kansas via the Pony Express Bridge and Elwood, Kansas to reach the airport.

The U.S. Army Corps of Engineers formalized the course change by dredging cut-off channel for the river between the airport and downtown St. Joseph. An oxbow lake (Browning Lake) was formed in the old Bellemont Bend and Elwood Bend portions of the river channel. The cut-off channel modified portions of Bon Ton Bend and St. Joseph Bend, and separated the city from the airport. A bridge and highway were later constructed to connect the two.

Construction during the next twenty years included a main hangar building (1954), a flight office building (1960), an emergency generator building (1963), a center taxiway (1973), and a runway (1974–75).

The Great Flood of 1993 destroyed the City Administration Building and the Cockpit Cafe. Both were rebuilt. The oldest, center hangar had to be demolished. In 1994, the diagonal runway, Runway 13–31, was rebuilt into a new assault landing strip for the Air National Guard and as an additional VFR runway for general aviation aircraft. A new fixed-base operator building and a hangar were also constructed.

Airline flights began by 1939, on Mid-Continent. Successor Braniff pulled out in 1959, replaced by Frontier Airlines and Ozark Air Lines; Ozark left in 1960 and Frontier left in 1969, three years before Kansas City International Airport opened 30 miles (48 km) south of St Joseph. Since then the airport has been used for crop spraying, charter passenger and cargo services, pilot training, nightly mail delivery, and until its acquisition by American Airlines, pilot training by Trans World Airlines (TWA). Its main use now is as a base for the Missouri Air National Guard.

== Rosecrans Air National Guard Base ==
With the end of World War II, much of the former U.S. Army Air Forces installation was transferred to the city with the exception of 142 acres (0.57 km^{2}) for the National Guard. With the establishment of an independent U.S. Air Force in 1947, the military facilities became part of the newly established Air National Guard. This facility became the foundation for the current Rosecrans Air National Guard Base.

Rosecrans ANGB is currently home to the 139th Airlift Wing (139 AW), an Air Mobility Command (AMC)-gained unit of the Missouri Air National Guard, which functions as the host wing for the installation. The 139 AW flies the "H2" variant of the C-130H Hercules tactical airlift aircraft.

An additional tenant command at Rosecrans ANGB is the Advanced Airlift Tactics Training Center (AATTC), a combined activity of both the Air National Guard (ANG) and the Air Force Reserve Command (AFRC).

The mission of the Advanced Airlift Tactics Training Center (AATTC) is to increase the warfighting effectiveness and survivability of all USAF air mobility forces. AATTC is made up of full-time Air National Guard and Air Force Reserve personnel dedicated to increasing the warfighting effectiveness and survivability of air mobility forces, providing advanced tactics training to tactical airlift crews and support personnel from the Air National Guard, Air Force Reserve Command, Air Mobility Command, Air Combat Command, Air Force Special Operations Command, the United States Marine Corps, and twelve Allied nations. The AATTC functions as a clearinghouse for gathering and disseminating airlift tactics information. Since 1983 the AATTC has hosted an annual Tactics Symposium at Rosecrans ANGB as a forum for providing crosstalk across the tactics community.

Both the 139 AW and the AATTC are made up of a mix of approximately 400 full-time Active Guard and Reserve (AGR) and Air Reserve Technician (ART) personnel, augmented by over 1000 traditional part-time Air National Guardsmen and Air Force Reservists.

== See also ==
- Missouri World War II Army Airfields
- Air Transport Command
