= 180th Airlift Squadron =

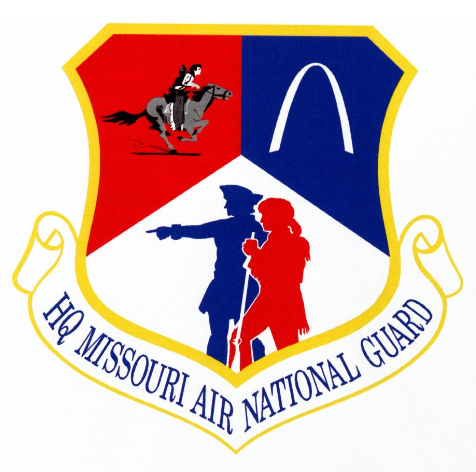
180th Airlift Squadron

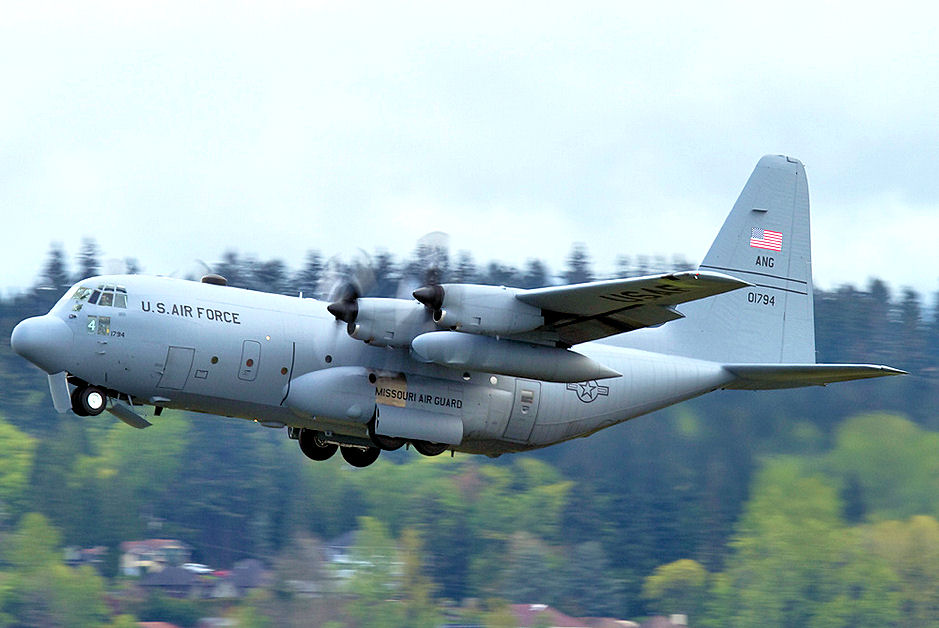
- 180th Airlift Squadron C-130 Hercules (Note: Aircraft is Lockheed C-130H2 Hercules, serial 90-1794. Originally City of Crestline with 164th Airlift Squadron. Baugher, Joe (19 August 2023). "1990 USAF Serial Numbers". Joe Baugher..)
- Active: 1942–1945; 1946–1953; 1953–1969; 1969–present
- Country: United States
- Allegiance: Missouri
- Branch: Air National Guard
- Type: Squadron
- Role: Airlift
- Part of: Missouri Air National Guard
- Garrison/HQ: Rosecrans Air National Guard Base, Missouri
- Motto: Ecce Signum (Latin for 'Behold the Sign') (World War II)
- Engagements: Mediterranean Theater of Operations; Pacific Ocean Theater of World War II
- Decorations: Distinguished Unit Citation; Air Force Outstanding Unit Award; French Croix de Guerre with Palm

Insignia
- 180th Airlift Squadron emblem

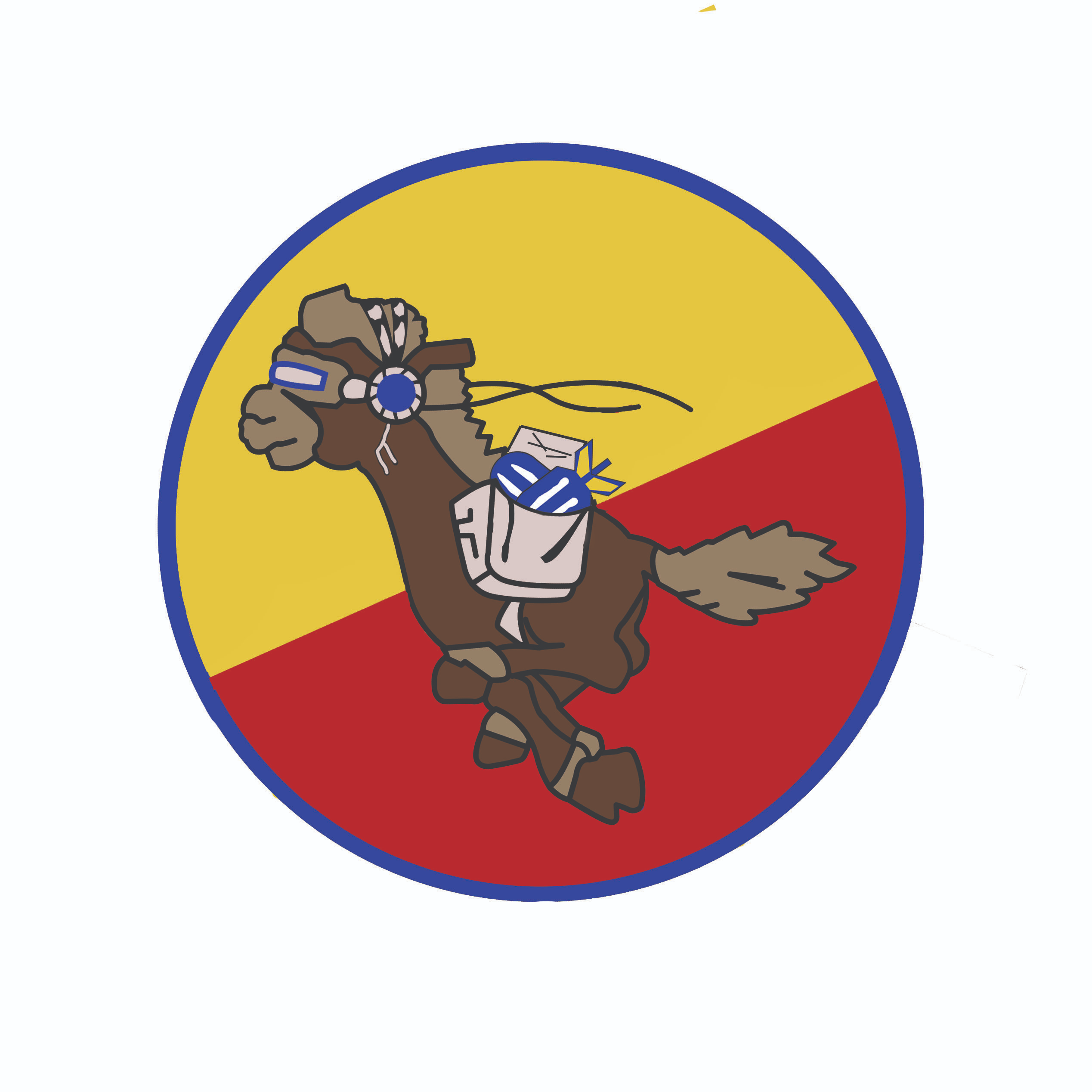
- 180th Bombardment Squadron emblem (Note: Approved 8 March 1951. Description: On a disc, divided by a centerline into two semi circles each containing 180°, or and gules, piped azure, a mule courant proper (brown, with nose, hooves and tail shades of light tan) wearing goggles and earphones proper (shades of tan with blue glasses and trimming) and belted on his back all within a saddle bag proper (light tan) two bombs proper (steel blue).)

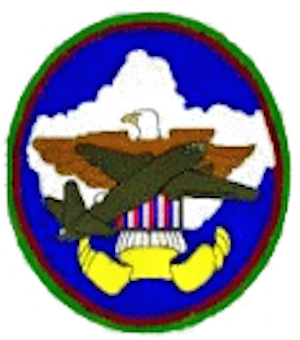
- 438th Bombardment Squadron emblem
- Tail marking: Gray Stripe "St Joseph" Black Letters

The 180th Airlift Squadron is a unit of the Missouri Air National Guard 139th Airlift Wing located at Rosecrans Air National Guard Base, St. Joseph, Missouri. The 180th is equipped with the C-130H2 Hercules.

The squadron was first activated in June 1942 as the 438th Bombardment Squadron and equipped with the Martin B-26 Marauder. After training in the United States, it deployed to the Mediterranean Theater of Operations, where its actions in combat earned it two Distinguished Unit Citation and a French Croix de Guerre with Palm. In late 1944, it was withdrawn from combat operations and returned to the United States, where it converted to the Douglas A-26 Invader. It moved to Okinawa, where it engaged in combat against Japan. Following V-J Day, the squadron returned to the United States and was inactivated.

In 1946, the squadron was allotted to the National Guard and redesignated the 180th Bombardment Squadron. It activated in Illinois and was again iequipped with the Invader, which was called the B-26 after 1948. In 1951, the squadron was called to active duty. It moved to France and supported North Atlantic Treaty Organization operations until January 1953, when it transferred its personnel and equipment to a regular Air Force Unit and was inactivated and returned to state control.

The squadron returned to state control in 1953, in 1957 it became as a fighter aircraft squadron, with an air defense mission. IN 1962, it gained the airlift mission, which it has performed ever since, except for the period from 1968 to 1976, when its mission was air refueling. Prior to 1968, it was a strategic airlift unit, but since 1976 has performed in a tactical role. It flew combat missions during Operation Just Case and members of the squadron and its aircraft participated in Operation Desert Storm

== History ==
=== World War II ===
==== Organization and preparation for combat ====
The squadron was first activated on 26 June 1942 at Barksdale Field, Louisiana, as the 438th Bombardment Squadron, one of the four original squadrons of the 319th Bombardment Group. a Martin B-26 Marauder medium bombardment group. The squadron trained for combat at Barksdale and Harding Field, in Louisiana. The air echelon began ferrying its aircraft to England via the North Atlantic route on 27 August 1942, with the squadron officially moving to RAF Shipdham on 12 September 1942. By late October to early November, (Note: The 319th Group suffered several losses on the ferry flight, as winter weather began to impact the northern ferry route. Other planes were delayed for weather or aircraft malfunctions. As a result, further deployments of B-26 units to Europe travelled over the South Atlantic route, Freeman, pp. 15, 55.) squadron aircraft were in place at RAF Horsham St Faith. The ground echelon sailed on the RMS Queen Mary on 5 September.

==== Mediterranean Theater of Operations ====
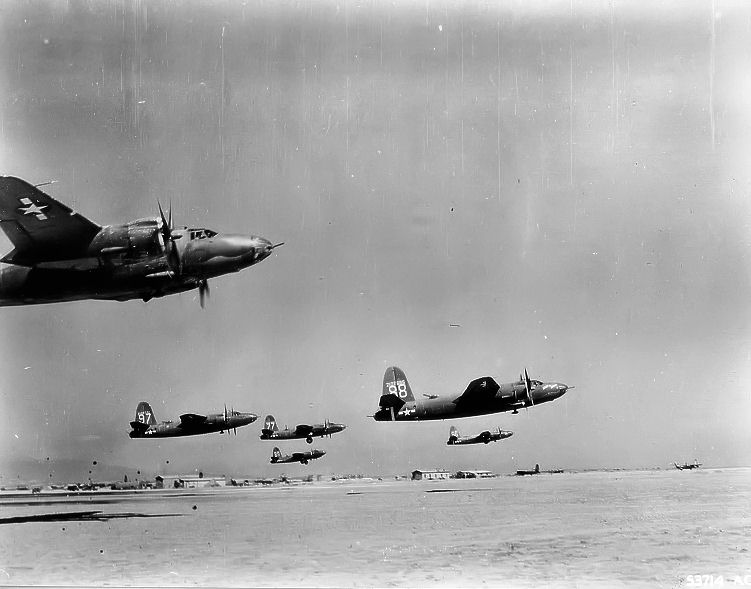
Formation of 319th Bombardment Group B-26 Marauders taking off

The air echelon of the squadron departed England on 12 November 1942 for Saint-Leu Airfield, Algeria. Although this was supposed to be a simple repositioning flight, it became the squadron's introduction to combat when the 319th Group formation strayed from its planned route and flew over occupied France, where they were attacked by German aircraft. Some of the ground echelon had made the amphibious landing at Arzeu beach on 8 November. However, it was not until the following March that all aircraft had made the move to North Africa.

The squadron began combat quickly, flying its first sorties during November. Until March 1943, it made strikes at enemy targets in Tunisia, including railroads, airfields, and harbor installations. It struck enemy shipping in the Mediterranean Sea to block reinforcements and supplies from reaching opposing Axis forces.

In March 1943, the squadron was withdrawn from combat and moved to Oujda Airfield, French Morocco for a period of reorganization and training. On 1 June, it moved forward to Sedrata Airfield, Algeria and resumed combat operations. It participated in Operation Corkscrew, the reduction of Pantelleria, that month. The following month it provided air support for Operation Husky, the invasion of Sicily. After Sicily fell, it directed most of its attacks on targets in Italy. It supported Operation Avalanche, the invasion of Italy, in September. These operations concentrated on airfields, marshalling yards airfields, viaducts, gun sites and other defense positions. In November, it moved from Africa to Decimomannu Airfield, Sardinia to shorten the range to targets in central Italy.

From January to March 1944, the squadron supported Allied ground forces as they advanced in the Battle of Monte Cassino and Operation Shingle, the landings at Anzio. As ground forces approached Rome, it flew interdiction missions. On 3 March 1944, the squadron earned a Distinguished Unit Citation (DUC) for an attack on rail facilities in Rome, while carefully avoiding damage to religious and cultural monuments. Eight days later, it earned a second DUC for an attack on marshalling yards in Florence, disrupting communications between Florence and Rome. Its support of French forces between April and June earned the squadron the French Croix de Guerre with Palm.

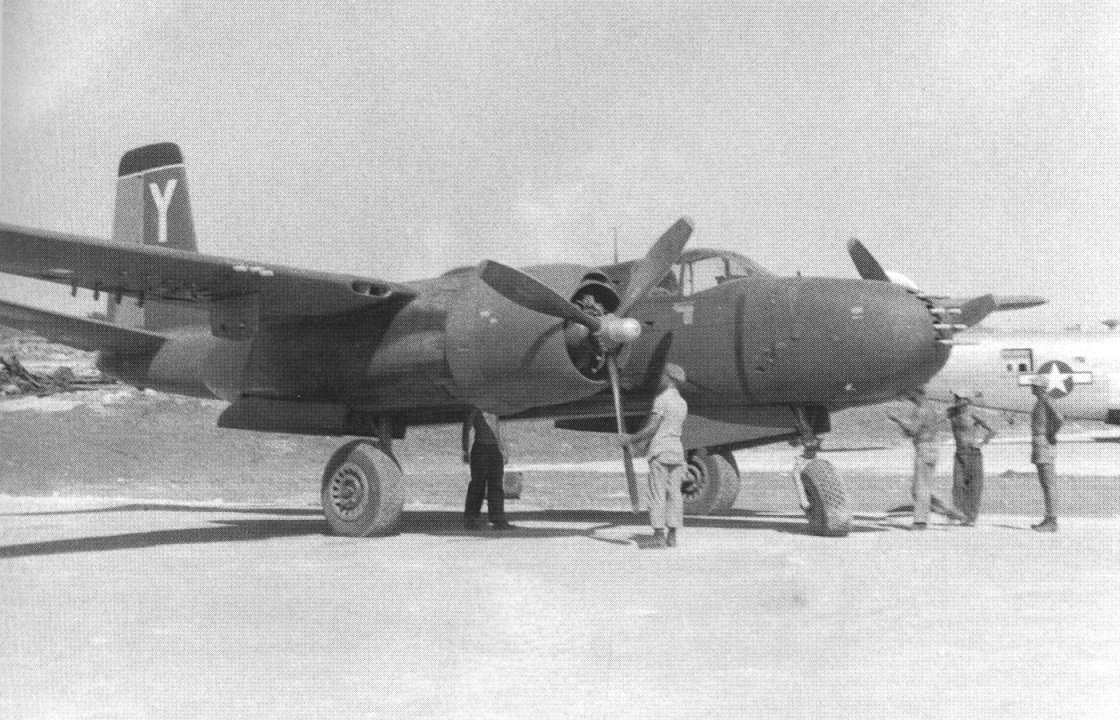
A-26 at Machinato Airfield in 1945

In August and September 1944, the squadron supported Operation Dragoon, the invasion of southern France, moving forward to Serragia Airfield, Corsica the following month. It attacked German supply lines in northern Italy, including bombing bridges over the Po River. It also attacked some targets in Yugoslavia. It continued combat operations while transitioning into the North American B-25 Mitchell from its Marauders. At the end of the year, the squadron was withdrawn from combat and returned to the United States in January 1945 to begin training with the Douglas A-26 Invader in preparation for deployment to the Western Pacific.

==== Combat in the Pacific ====
The squadron completed its training in the new bomber and departed to reenter combat in April 1945. It arrived on Okinawa in early July and was established at Machinato Airfield later that month. It flew its first mission in the Pacific on 16 July 1945. It flew missions in China and Japan, attacking airfields, shipping, marshalling yards, industrial centers and other targets until V-J Day. It was briefly assigned to VII Bomber Command when the 319th departed Okinawa on 21 November 1945. The squadron left in December, and was inactivated at the Port of Embarkation on 6 January 1946.

The squadron completed its training in the new bomber and departed to reenter combat in April 1945. It arrived on Okinawa in early July and was established at Machinato Airfield later that month. It flew its first mission in the Pacific on 16 July 1945. It flew missions in China and Japan, attacking airfields, shipping, marshalling yards, industrial centers and other targets until V-J Day. The squadron left Okinawa on 21 November 1945, and was inactivated at the Port of Embarkation on 13 December 1945.

=== Missouri Air National Guard ===
The squadron was reactivated and redesignated the 180th Bombardment Squadron, and was allotted to the National Guard, on 24 May 1946. It was organized at Rosecrans Memorial Airport, St Joseph, Missouri and extended federal recognition on 22 August 1946. The squadron was equipped with A-26 Invaders and assigned to the 66th Fighter Wing, located at Lambert Field, St Louis. In February 1947, it was assigned to the 126th Bombardment Group, an Illinois National Guard unit, but in February 1950, its headquarters was changed to a Missouri Air National Guard unit, the 131st Composite Group.

==== Korean War activation ====
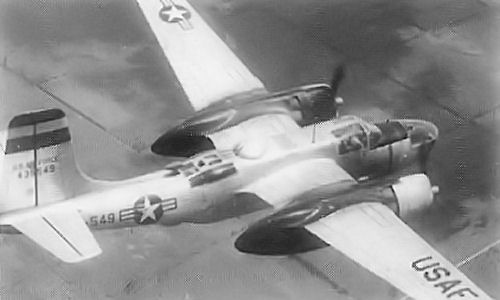
Squadron B-26C at Bordeaux-Mérignac AB, France, 1951-1952 (Note: Aircraft is Douglas A-26C-35-DT Invader (later B-26), serial 44-35549.Baugher, Joe (19 August 2023). "1944 USAF Serial Numbers". Joe Baugher.)

On 1 April 1951 the 180th was federalized and brought to active duty due to the Korean War, and moved to Langley Air Force Base, Virginia. At Langley, the squadron was assigned to the 126th Bombardment Gr+oup, which had also been called to active duty. The 126th Group consisted of the 180th, along with the 108th, 115th and the 168th Bombardment Squadrons from the Illinois and California Air National Guards, although the 115th was soon reassigned to another wing. The aircraft were marked by various color bands on the vertical stabilizer and rudder. Black/Yellow/Blue for the 108th; Black/Yellow/Red for the 168th, and Black/Yellow/Green for the 180th. On active duty, the 126th Group completed its reorganization under the Wing Base organization system as part of the 126th Bombardment Wing. The squadron trained intensively for combat operations, but instead of being sent to reinforce Far East Air Forces, it was ordered to France to augment the forces of the North Atlantic Treaty Organization. the squadron was to be stationed at Laon-Couvron Air Base, France, but Laon was not ready to receive a combat wing, so the unit was initially stationed at Bordeaux-Mérignac Air Base, France.

The 180th Squadron was the first in the 126th Wing to deploy, taking off from Langley on 30 October. During its flight across the North Atlantic, it was accompanied by a pair of Douglas C-47 Skytrains to provide communications support. The ground echelon sailed for France aboard the USS General H. F. Hodges. The only accident during the wing's deployment occurred when the wing tip of a squadron B-26 came in contact with the tail cone of another as they were coasting into France, although both planes landed safely.

Bordeaux had minimal facilities to support the squadron. Personnel were quartered in tents, and aircraft maintenance had to be performed outdoors due to lack of hangars. (Note: Hangars on the base had been bombed and since the base was unused after World War II, never repaired. McAuliffe, p. 149.) Early operations included flights to German bases for radar calibration and exercises with fighter interceptors. In February 1952 the squadron deployed to a French Air Force station to participate in Operation Grand Slam. When the squadron was mobilized, Tactical Air Command decided that the turret system on the B-26 Invader was obsolete. It grounded the squadron's experienced gunners and transferred them to other units. In November 1951, as the squadron arrived in France, this determination was reversed, and the squadron began to receive untrained airmen as gunners, The squadron improved its gunner's proficiency especially in January and February 1952 through its participation in Operation Vampire, a combined air to air gunnery exercise with French de Havilland Vampires.

Squadron enlisted strength was depleted by about 60% by a Headquarters, United States Air Force (USAF) early release program, that affected ANG airmen. Those whose enlistments would expire later in the year, World War II veterans, and "non-essential" personnel were all released from active duty by April. This problem could have been worse, but while reorganizing at Langley, about 25% of the squadron were assigned from the regular Air Force.

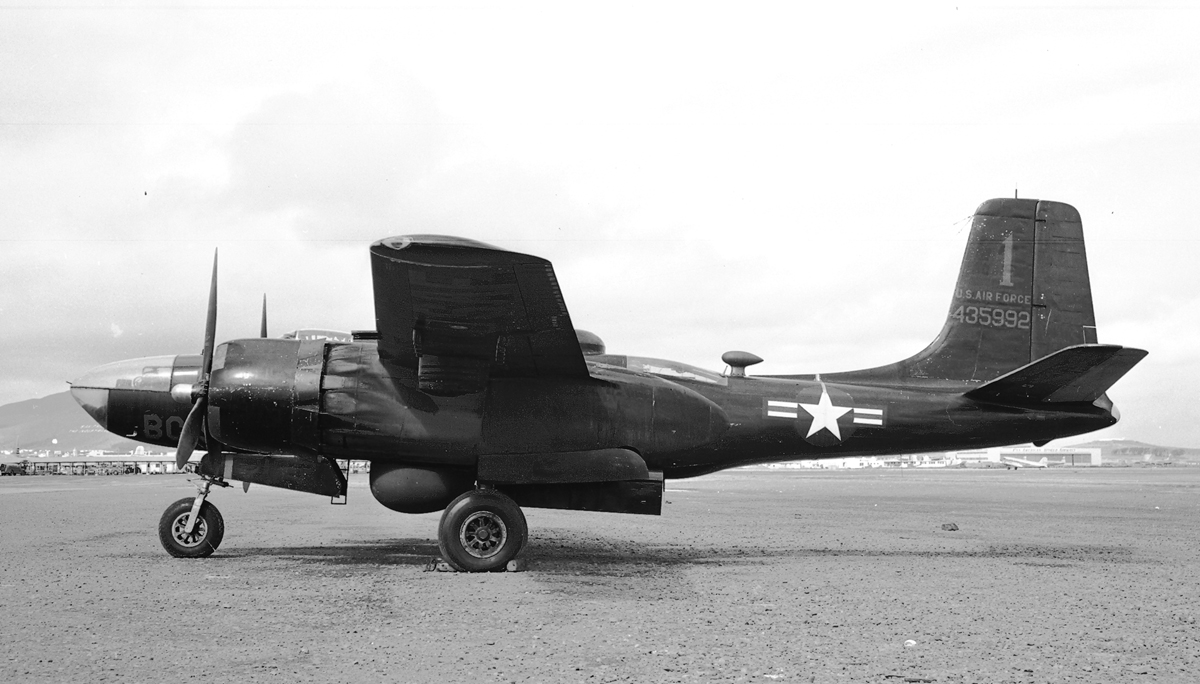
B-26C in night intruder camouflage (Note: Aircraft is Douglas A-26-55-DT Invader (later B-26)Baugher, Joe (19 August 2023). "1944 USAF Serial Numbers". Joe Baugher.)

In February 1952, USAF transferred 40 B-26s to the French Air Force and the 126th Wing was charged with the initial training of three to six crews per month. Starting in April 1952, the squadron was tasked to support USAF Project 7109. Under this project, it deployed crews to Korea for 90 day temporary duty. This project provided the unit with a cadre of experienced combat crews, and helped alleviate a shortage of crews in combat. The squadron continued to support his program until it was inactivated and returned to the National Guard.

In May 1952, the squadron moved to its intended base, Laon-Couvron Air Base, whose runway had been completed in March. The squadron was not combat capable during its stay at Bordeaux, for the base lacked bombs, bomb loading vehicles and rockets. Base construction continued at Laon during the squadron's stay there Manning problems continued after the squadron move. By 1 August, all officer aircrew were from the regular Air Force. At Laon, the squadron began bombing and rocketry training in addition to the gunnery training. It participated in close air support exercises with various NATO allies. On 2 November, the squadron lost two B-26s during NATO exercise in Italy.

In September, the squadron was designated as being combat ready. However, the squadron had begun receiving black painted B-26Cs from the depot starting in the spring of 1952. In the fall, it began training on the night intruder mission. and its mission was officially changed to nighttime operations in November. All enlisted members of the Air National Guard were released from active duty on 2 December. on 1 January 1953, the squadron was relieved from active duty and its mission, personnel, and equipment were transferred to the 822d Bombardment Squadron, which was simultaneously activated. A few ANG officers remained on active duty for as much as six months.

==== Return to the Missouri Air National Guard ====
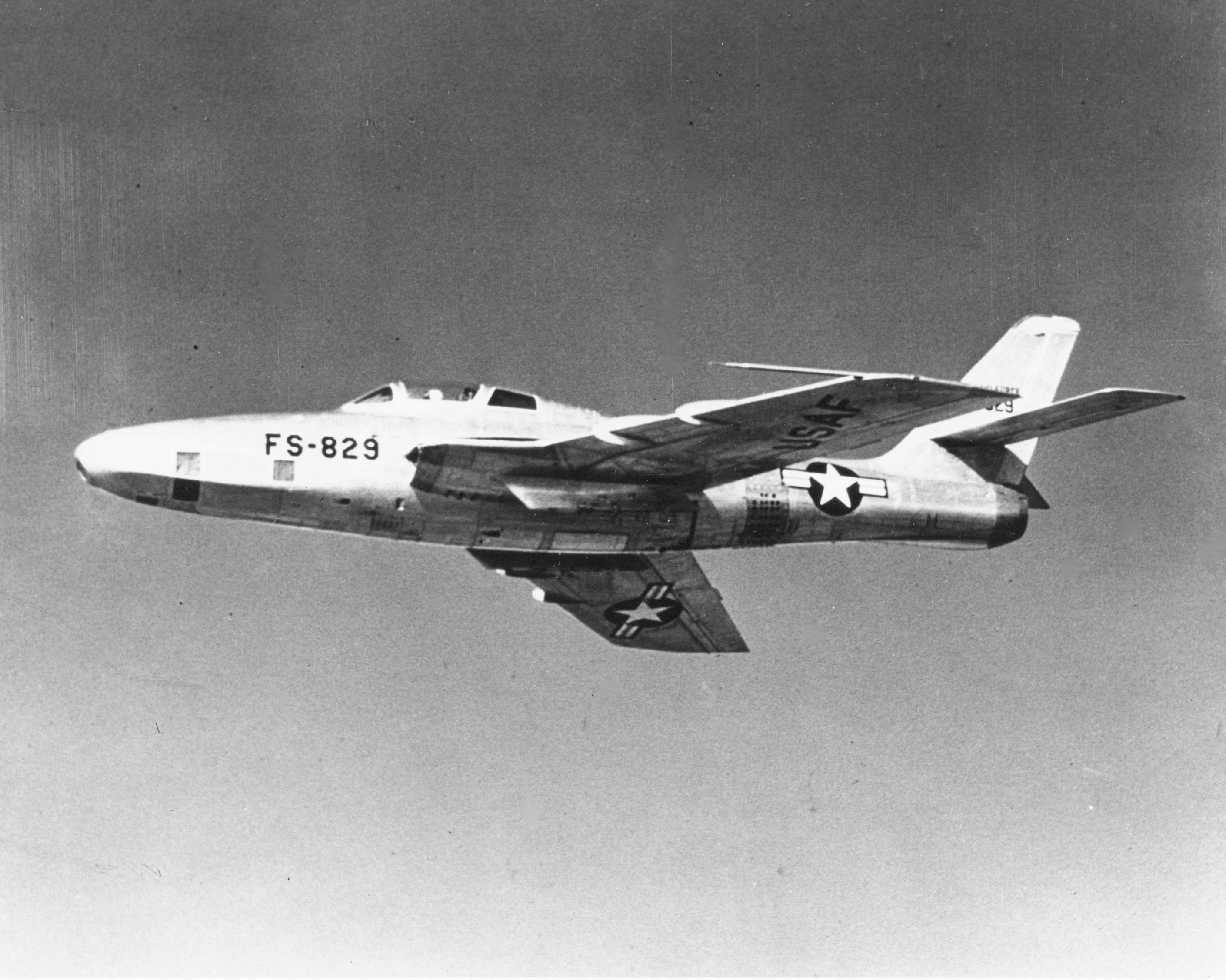
RF-84f as flown by the 180th Tactical Reconnaissance Squadron

Returning to Rosecrans Airport, the 180th was reformed as a light bombardment squadron in January 1953. It received B-26 Invaders that returned from the Korean War and trained primarily in night bombardment missions, which the aircraft specialized in while in Korea.

With the removal of the B-26 from bombing duties in 1957 as neared the end of their service lives, the squadron received some Lockheed F-80C Shooting Star jet fighters and some Republic RF-84F Thunderflash reconnaissance aircraft. It was redesignated the 180th Fighter-Interceptor Squadron with an air defense mission on 1 July 1957, then transferred out the F-80s and was redesignated as the 180th Tactical Reconnaissance Squadron on 10 April 1958, performing aerial reconnaissance missions for the next four years.

==== Strategic airlift ====
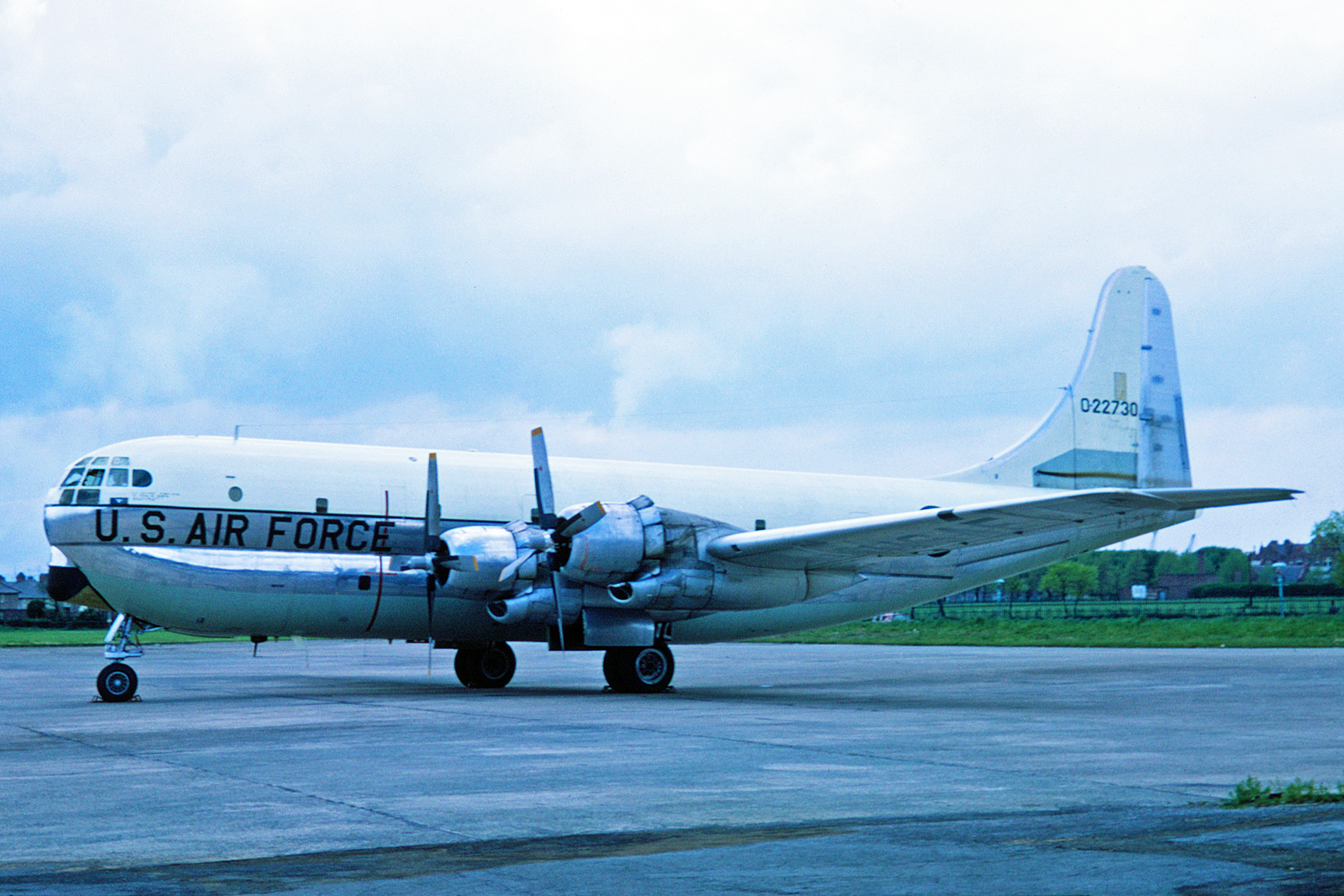
C-97G as flown by the 180th

On 14 April 1962, the 180th was redesignated the 180th Air Transport Squadron and in wartime was gained by Military Air Transport Service (MATS), trading in its Thunderflash jet reconnaissance aircraft for 4-engined Boeing C-97 Stratofreighter transports. With air transportation recognized as a critical wartime need. With the transition to MATS, the 180th was authorized to expand to a group level, and the 139th Air Transport Group was established, the 180th becoming the group's flying squadron. Other squadrons assigned into the group were the 139th Group headquarters, 139th Material Squadron (Maintenance), 139th Air Base Squadron, and the 139th USAF Dispensary.

The 180th augmented MATS strategic airlift forces worldwide in support of the Air Force's needs. Throughout the 1960s, the unit flew long range transport missions in support of Air Force requirements, frequently sending aircraft to Europe, Alaska, the Caribbean, Hawaii, Japan, the Philippines, and during the Vietnam War, to South Vietnam, Okinawa and Thailand. With the replacement of MATS by Military Airlift Command, the squadron was redesignated the180th Military Airlift Squadron on 1 January 1966.

==== Air Refueling ====
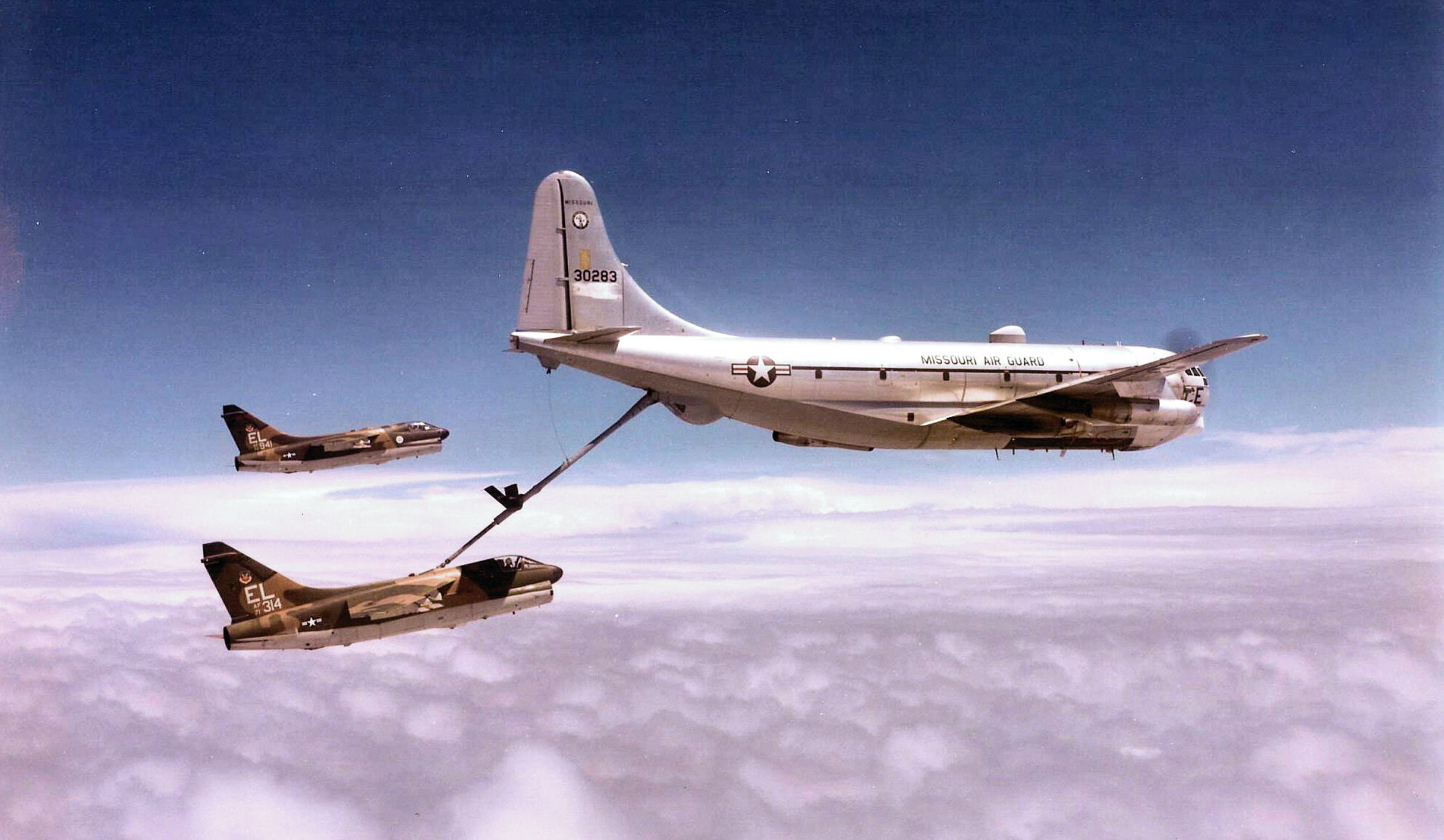
Squadron KC-97L Stratofreighter refueling A-7D Corsair IIs from England AFB, Louisiana. (Note: Tanker is Boeing KC-97G-145-BO Stratofreighter, serial 53-283. This airplane served in active duty with the 70th Bombardment Wing and was sent to the Military Aircraft Storage and Disposition Center. It was returned to service with the Air National Guard in 1970 and modified as KC-97L. Baugher, Joe (5 August 2023). "1953 USAF Serial Numbers". Joe Baugher. The receiver aircraft are Ling-Temco-Vought A-7D-10-SV, serial 71-314 and Ling-Temco-Vought A-7D-7-SV, serial 70-941 of the 23d Tactical Fighter Wing. Baugher, Joe (5 August 2023). "1971 USAF Serial Numbers". Joe Baugher. Baugher, Joe (9 July 2023). "1970 USAF Serial Numbers". Joe Baugher.)

In 1969, the 180th had a change in mission when the squadron's wartime gaining command changed from MAC to Strategic Air Command (SAC) [sic], (Note: Department of the Air Force AFOMO Letter, 18 Sep 1969 Subject: Designation of Gaining Commands and Reassignment upon Mobilization of Units of the Air National Guard of the United States designated TAC as the gaining command for ANG refueling units. AFOMO Ltr 196p, 18 Sep 69, para. 1.a.(8).) becoming the 180th Air Refueling Squadron. Under SAC the group became an air refueling unit, being equipped with the air refueling version of the C-97 transport, the KC-97L whose four piston engines were augmented by a pair of jet engines to improve the plane's ability to refuel jet fighters, as the 180th Air Refueling Squadron. Familiarity with the aircraft led to a smooth transition from MAC to the new refueling mission. It supported the United States Air Forces in Europe flying air refueling missions in the KC-97 supporting missions of deploying aircraft to NATO for tactical exercises.

SAC did not have sufficient Boeing KC-135 Stratotankers to support United States Air Forces in Europe (USAFE) requirements for training due to support requirements of SAC's nuclear alert mission and the growing requirements of the Vietnam War. Operation Creek Party was initiated in 1967 to use older Air National Guard KC-97ls to provide in-flight refueling services for fighter aircraft assigned to aUSAFE Creek Party aircraft normally deployed to Rhein-Main Air Base, Germany. The squadron maintainers, working in austere conditions, usually outdoors played a vital role in sustaining their aging KC-97Lst. Creek Party was the earliest sustained overseas volunteer rotation by a reserve component of the U.S. armed forces to support a real-world military mission in a situation short of war. These deployments continued during the entire time the squadron operated KC-97s.

==== Tactical airlift ====
In 1976 the KC-97s were retired and the unit returned to MAC as its gaining command and returned to its airlift mission, this time as the 180th Tactical Airlift Squadron. The 180th was re-equipped with Lockheed C-130A Hercules tactical airlifters. MAC had been providing United States Southern Command, rotating C-130s to Howard Air Force Base, Panama through Operation Volant Oak. In 1977, the mission was transferred to the Air National Guard and Air Force Reserve and renamed Operation Coronet Oak and the 180th began supporting the operation on a rotating basis.

During a November 1978 180th deployment to Howard, the squadron was caught up in a real world situation when with the Mass murders and suicides at the Peoples Temple at Jonestown, Guyana. A 180th C-130, was the first US military aircraft to land at Timehri International Airport, Guyana, carrying US embassy officials that they had picked up in Venezuela as well as food and supplies meant for the survivors the Americans hoped to take out of Guyana. That, of course, was before it became apparent that most of the more than 900 members and their children were lying dead in Jonestown.

In late 1980 and through 1983, members of the 180th embarked on a special project to enhance survivability of C-130 aircrews while flying in a hostile environment. The need for this type of training became apparent after C-130 units from MAC began to participate in Red Flag exercises at Nellis Air Force Base, Nevada. It was obvious that the C-130s were not doing well against the ground and air threats posed in the Red Flag exercise. After formalapproval from the National Guard Bureau and tacit approval from MAC, they began service test to validate the training program. After more than three service tests, the program proved its worth and the Advanced Airlift Tactics Training Center was approved and instituted on 4 February 1984 at Rosecrans.

In March 1987, the 180th began to receive brand-new C-130H2s to replace the C-130As they had flown for the past ten years. In October 1987, the 180th deployed two C-130H2 aircraft supporting United States Army Special Forces and Royal Australian Special Air Service Regiment in a combined personnel airdrop exercise called Badge Anvil 1987 at RAAF Learmonth, Australia. The exercise provided high altitude low opening and high altitude high opening parachute training. Since all of the airdrops occurred above 10,000 feet and as high as 24,500 feet, the 15th Physiological Training Flight also supported the exercise and provided supplemental oxygen equipment, training and support for the training missions.

In 1989, the 180th with four C-130H2 aircraft deployed to Kimhae International Airport, Korea to support Operation Team Spirit 1989. During the exercise, the 180th flew challenging missions including tactical resupply, fuel bladder missions, assault landings on short runways including landing on highway landing strips, numerous airdrop missions including both visual, high altitude and radar drop scenarios.

In December 1989, the 180th was once again deployed at Howard when Operation Just Cause began. The 180th flew combat missions in support of the operation.

==== 1991 Gulf War ====
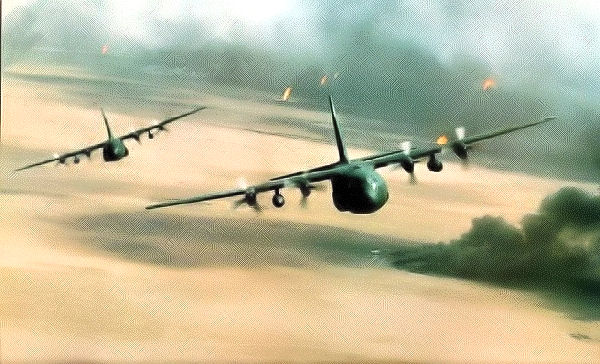
180th Tactical Airlift Squadron flying over Kuwait 1991

Following Iraq's August 1990 invasion of Kuwait, a call was sent out to Air National Guard tactical airlift units for volunteers to deploy to the Persian Gulf. Members of the 180th volunteered for duty. On 17 August, two squadron C-130's were mobilized and placed on alert for deployment to the Persian Gulf. After delays caused by the need for foreign basing rights in the Gulf region, the aircraft departed on 4 September 1990. There, they helped form the first Air National Guard provisional airlift squadron in Southwest Asia. The squadron members remained in theater until 8 October.

The 180th Tactical Airlift Squadron was ordered to active duty on 28 December 1990, to support Operation Desert Shield. For some unit members, this was a return to the Persian Gulf. On 2 January 1991, the 180th and its 8 C-130H aircraft and personnel departed Missouri for Al Ain Air Base, United Arab Emirates. Deployed elements were assigned to the 1632nd Tactical Airlift Squadron (Provisional) (TAS), part of the 1630th Tactical Airlift Wing (Provisional) (Note: Originally, 435th Tactical Airlift Wing (Provisional).) which was under the 1610th Air Division (Provisional) and the 180th became a paper unit. The 1632nd TAS remained at Al Ain through the air war and the ground war flying combat and combat support missions in support of the allied operations. Beginning on 22 March 1991, the squadron moved to Al Kharj Air Base, Saudi Arabia. The 180th departed Al Kharj on 28 May 1991, and returned to Rosecrans on 30 May 1991. (Note: When the aircraft arrived home, they had "nose art" on each courtesy of the crew chiefs. The nose art was 391 "Connie Kay", 392 "Desert Possum", 393 "Spirit of St. Joe", 394 "The Hog", 395 "Chief", 396 "Buzzard", 397 "Riders on the Storm" and 398 "Fike's Filly".) The 180th was relieved from active duty and released back to state control on 24 June 1991.

==== Second return to state control ====
During the 1990s, the 180th provided airlift support to United States Air Forces Europe during Operation Provide Promise, Operation Joint Endeavor, Operation Joint Guard and Operation Joint Forge, the airlift operations into Bosnia and Herzegovina. Members of the 180th along with operations support and maintenance personnel deployed to Rhein-Main Air Base and, after it closed, to Ramstein Air Base and were assigned to Delta Squadron, which had been formed to provide airlift support to USAFE from Air National Guard and Air Force Reserve C-130 units. In 2008, Delta Squadron became the 38th Expeditionary Airlift Squadron. The Air National Guard would generally be responsible for a 90- or 120-day period and guard members would typically volunteer for duty for a minimum of a two- to three-week period although some would volunteer for longer periods.

==== Global War on Terrorism ====
Following the attacks on 11 September 2001, the 180th served in a support role flying missions transporting personnel and equipment in support of Operation Enduring Freedom. The squadron was partially mobilized in February 2003 as a result of the impending conflict in Iraq which would later be known as Operation Iraqi Freedom. The federalized elements of the unit deployed in March 2003 to the Iraqi theater and later supported Operation Enduring Freedom in Afghanistan. The mobilization ended and these elements werereleased from active duty in March 2006.

The 180th is now participating in the Air and Space Expeditionary Force schedule supporting USAF operations worldwide.

=== Lineage ===
180th Military Airlift Squadron

- Constituted as the 438th Bombardment Squadron (Medium) on 19 June 1942

Activated on 26 June 1942
Redesignated 438th Bombardment Squadron, Medium c. 1944
Redesignated 438th Bombardment Squadron, Light on 3 February 1945
Inactivated on 13 December 1945

- Redesignated 180th Bombardment Squadron, Light and allotted to the National Guard on 24 May 1946

Activated on 21 June 1946
Extended federal recognition on 22 August 1946
Federalized and placed on active duty on 1 April 1951
Inactivated and returned to Missouri state control on 1 January 1953
Activated on 1 January 1953
Redesignated 180th Bombardment Squadron, Tactical c. 1955
Redesignated 180th Fighter-Interceptor Squadron on 15 June 1957
Redesignated 180th Tactical Reconnaissance Squadron, Photographic, Jet on 10 April 1958
Redesignated 180th Air Transport Squadron, Heavy on 14 April 1962
Redesignated 180th Military Airlift Squadron on 1 January 1966
Inactivated on 5 September 1969
Consolidated with 180th Airlift Squadron on 31 May 1991

180th Airlift Squadron
Constituted as the 180th Air Refueling Squadron, 1 May 1969
Activated on 5 September 1969
Redesignated 180th Tactical Airlift Squadron on 16 October 1976
Federalized and placed on active duty on 28 December 1990
Consolidated with 180th Military Airlift Squadron on 31 May 1991
Released from active duty and returned to Missouri state control on 24 June 1991
Redesignated 180th Airlift Squadron on 1 June 1992

=== Assignments ===
- 319th Bombardment Group, 26 June 1942 – 13 December 1945
- Missouri National Guard, 21 June 1946
- 66th Fighter Wing, June 1946
- 126th Bombardment Group, February 1947
- 131st Composite Group, 1 November 1950
- 126th Bombardment Group, 1 February 1951 – 1 January 1953
- 140th Fighter-Bomber Group, 1 January 1953
- 131st Bombardment Group (later 131st Fighter-Interceptor Group), March 1953
- 118th Tactical Reconnaissance Group, 10 April 1958
- 139th Air Transport Group (later 139th Military Airlift Group), 14 April 1962
- 139th Air Refueling Group (later 139th Tactical Airlift Group, 139th Airlift Group), 5 September 1969
- 139th Operations Group, 1 October 1995 – present

=== Stations ===
- Barksdale Field, Louisiana, 26 June 1942
- Harding Field, Louisiana, 8–27 August 1942
- RAF Shipdham (AAF-115), England, 12 September 1942
- RAF Horsham St Faith (AAF-123), England, 5–21 October 1942
- Saint-Leu Airfield, Algeria, c. 10 November 1942
- Oran Tafaraoui Airport, Algeria, 17 November 1942
- Maison Blanche Airport, Algeria, c. 26 November 1942
- Telergma Airfield, Algeria, 13 December 1942
- Oujda Airfield, French Morocco, 3 March 1943
- Rabat-Salé Airport, French Morocco, 25 April 1943
- Sedrata Airfield, Algeria, 1 June 1943
- Djedeida Airfield, Tunisia, 26 June 1943
- Decimomannu Air Base|Decimomannu Airfield, Sardinia, Italy, 1 November 1943
- Serragia Airfield, Corsica, France, 22 September 1944 – c. 9 January 1945
- Bradley Field, Connecticut, 25 January 1945
- Columbia Army Air Base, South Carolina, 28 February – 28 April 1945
- Kadena Airfield, Okinawa, 3 July 1945
- Machinato Airfield, Okinawa, 21 July – 23 November 1945
- Vancouver Barracks, Washington, c. 11–13 December 1945
- Rosecrans Memorial Airport, Missouri, 22 August 1946
- Langley Air Force Base, Virginia, 1 April – 1 November 1951
- Bordeaux-Merignac Air Base, France 1 November 1951 – 25 May 1952
- Laon-Couvron Air Base, France, 25 May 1952 – 31 December 1952
- Rosecrans Memorial Airport (later Rosecrans Air National Guard Base), Missouri, 1 January 1953 − present

=== Aircraft ===
- Martin B-26 Marauder, 1942 – 1944
- North American B-25 Mitchell, 1944 – 1945
- Douglas A-26 (after 1948, B-26) Invader, 1945 – 1946, 1946 – 1957
- Lockheed F-80C Shooting Star, 1957 – 1958
- Republic RF-84F Thunderflash, 1958 – 1961
- Boeing C-97G Stratofreighter, 1961 – 1968
- Boeing KC-97L Stratofreighter, 1968 – 1976
- Lockheed C-130A Hercules, 1976 – 1987
- Lockheed C-130H2 Hercules, 1987 - 2025
- Lockheed C-130H3 Hercules, 2025 – present 139th Airlift Wing News Release

=== Awards and campaigns ===
Award streamer	Award	Dates	Notes
	Distinguished Unit Citation	3 March 1944	Rome, Italy, 438th Bombardment Squadron
	Distinguished Unit Citation	11 March 1944	Florence, Italy, 438th Bombardment Squadron
	Air Force Outstanding Unit Award	30 July 1971–1 April 1973	180th Air Refueling Squadron (Note: In addition, the 139th Group/Wing earned Air Force Outstanding Unit Awards for 1 August 1974-30 July 1976 (139 AREFG) and 26 July 1997-25 July 1999 (139 AW). However, the Air Force Personnel Web Site does not list the squadron as participating in these awards.)
	Air Force Outstanding Unit Award	1 July 1989-20 June 1991	180th Tactical Airlift Squadron
	French Croix de Guerre with Palm	April, May and June 1944	438th Bombardment Squadron

Campaign Streamer	Campaign	Dates	Notes
	Air Combat, EAME Theater	12 September 1942 – 8 January 1945	438th Bombardment Squadron
	Algeria-French Morocco (with Arrowhead)	10 November 1942 – 11 November 1942	438th Bombardment Squadron
	Tunisia	12 November 1942 – 13 May 1943	438th Bombardment Squadron
	Sicily	14 May 1943 – 17 August 1943	438th Bombardment Squadron
	Naples-Foggia	18 August 1943 – 21 January 1944	438th Bombardment Squadron
	Anzio	22 January 1944 – 24 May 1944	438th Bombardment Squadron
	Rome-Arno	22 January 1944 – 9 September 1944	438th Bombardment Squadron
	Southern France	15 August 1944 – 14 September 1944	438th Bombardment Squadron
	North Apennines	10 September 1944 – 8 January 1945	438th Bombardment Squadron
	Air Offensive, Japan	2 July 1945 – 2 September 1945	438th Bombardment Squadron
	Ryukus	2 July 1945	438th Bombardment Squadron
	China Offensive	2 Jul 1945–2 September 1945	438th Bombardment Squadron

== See also ==
- List of United States Air Force installations
- Advanced Airlift Tactics Training Center
- List of Martin B-26 Marauder operators
- List of A-26 Invader operators
- List of C-130 Hercules operators
