= 139th Airlift Wing =

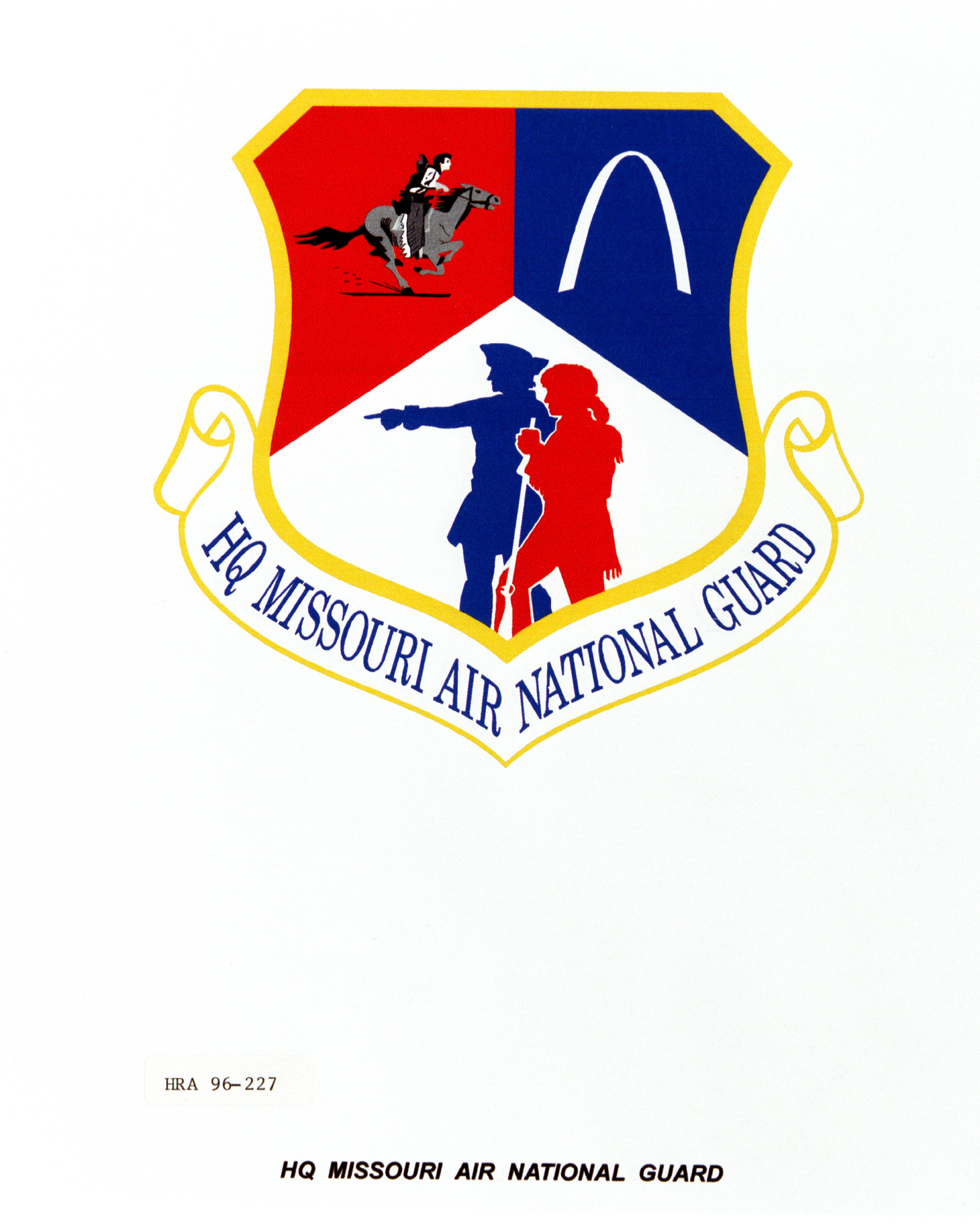
139th Airlift Wing

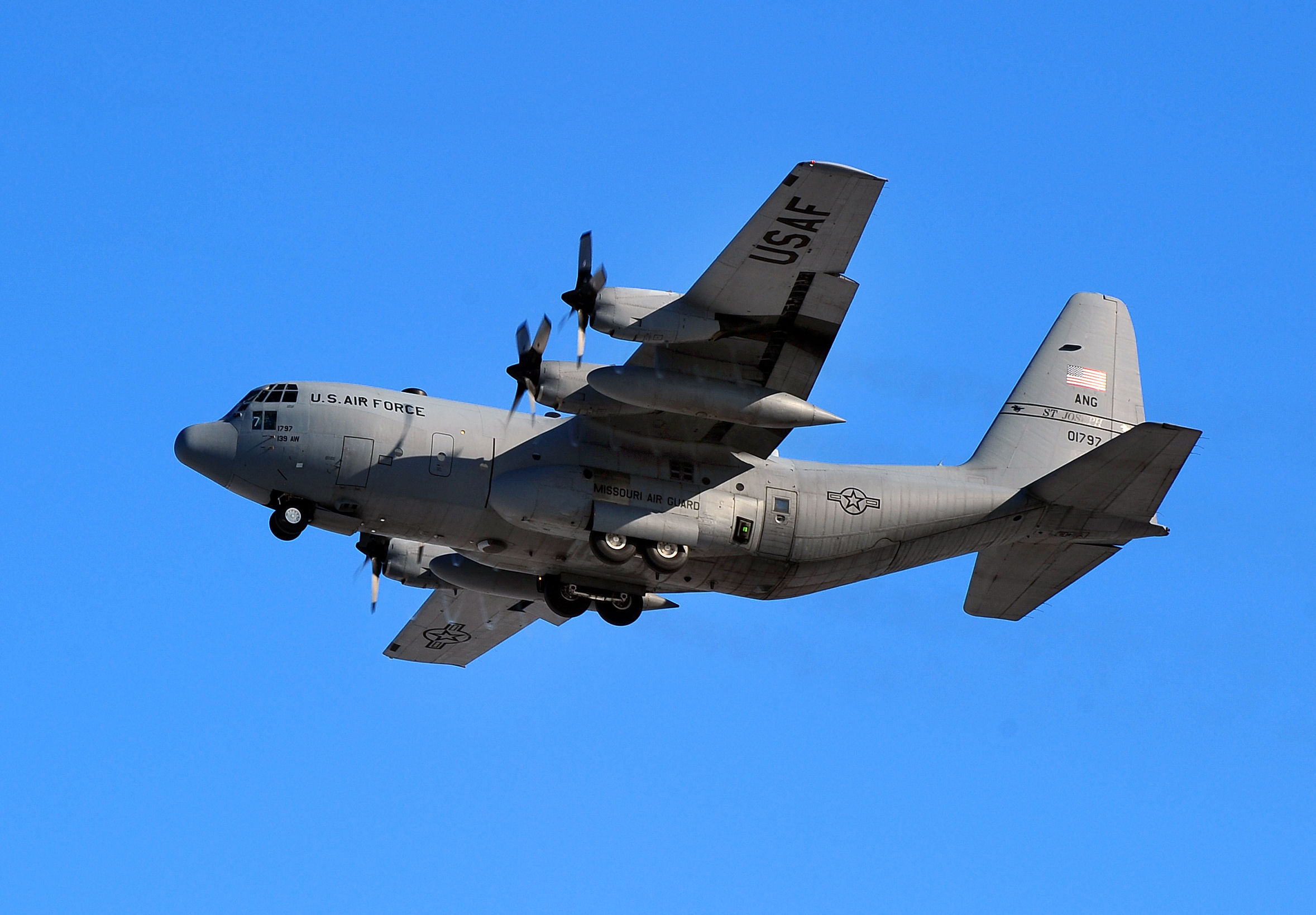
- 180th Airlift Squadron C-130H2 Hercules 90-1797
- Active: 1962–1969; 1969–present
- Country: United States
- Allegiance: Missouri
- Branch: Air National Guard
- Type: Wing
- Role: Airlift
- Part of: Missouri Air National Guard
- Garrison/HQ: Rosecrans Air National Guard Base, St. Joseph, Missouri
- Mottos: "Always ready, ever willing"
- Engagements: Gulf War; Operation Desert Shield; Operation Desert Storm; Operation Northern Watch; Operation Southern Watch; Operation Noble Eagle; Operation Enduring Freedom; Operation Iraqi Freedom; Operation Spartan Shield; Operation Inherent Resolve

Insignia
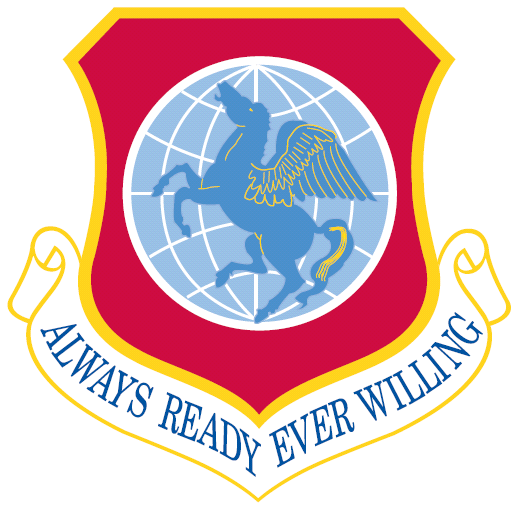
- 139th Airlift Wing emblem
- Tail stripe: Gray stripe "St Joseph" in black letters

The 139th Airlift Wing is a unit of the Missouri Air National Guard, based at Rosecrans Air National Guard Base in St. Joseph, Missouri.

The wing operates the C‑130H2 Hercules.

== Mission ==
The 139th Airlift Wing provides the State of Missouri and the nation with immediately deployable, combat-ready C-130H2 Hercules model aircraft. The 139th remains globally engaged in continuing operations.

== Organization ==
The 139th Airlift Wing consists of the following units:

- 139th Airlift Wing, at Rosecrans Air National Guard Base
  - Headquarters 139th Airlift Wing
  - 139th Operations Group
    - 180th Airlift Squadron
    - 139th Operations Support Flight
  - 139th Maintenance Group
    - 139th Aircraft Maintenance Squadron
    - 139th Maintenance Squadron
    - 139th Maintenance Operations Flight
  - 139th Medical Group
  - 139th Mission Support Group
    - 139th Force Support Squadron
    - 139th Logistics Readiness Squadron
    - 139th Communications Squadron
    - 139th Security Forces Squadron
    - 139th Civil Engineer Squadron

Other units also based at Rosecrans Air National Guard Base

- 241st Air Traffic Control Squadron

== History ==
On 14 April 1962, the Missouri Air National Guard 180th Air Transport Squadron was authorized to expand to a group level, and the 139th Air Transport Group was established by the National Guard Bureau, the 180th becoming the group's flying squadron. Other squadrons assigned into the group were the 139th Group headquarters, 139th Material Squadron (Maintenance and Supply), 139th Combat Support Squadron, and the 139th USAF Dispensary.

The 139th Air Transport Group was gained by Military Air Transport Service (MATS) if mobilized, equipped with 4-engined C-97 Stratofreighter transports. From St. Joseph, the 180th augmented MATS airlift capability worldwide in support of the Air Force's needs. Throughout the 1960s, the unit flew long-distance transport missions in support of Air Force requirements, frequently sending aircraft to Europe, Alaska, the Caribbean, Hawaii, Japan, the Philippines, and during the Vietnam War, to South Vietnam, Okinawa and Thailand. With the realignment of MATS to Military Airlift Command (MAC), the group was redesignated the 139th Military Airlift Group on 1 January 1966.

=== Air Refueling ===
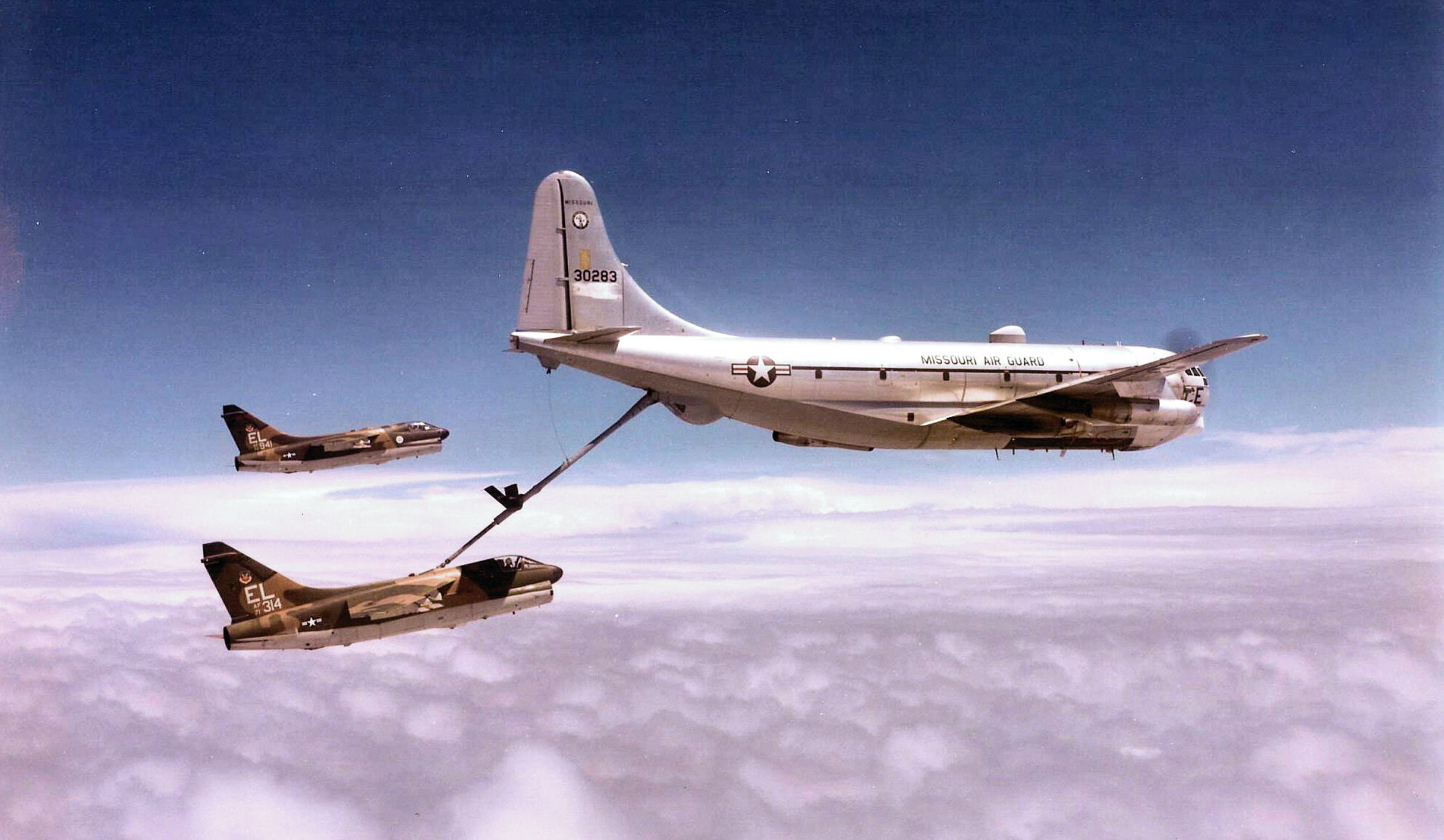
180th Air Refueling Squadron refueling A-7D Corsair IIs (Note: Aircraft is Boeing KC-97G Stratofreighter, serial 53-283; LTV A-7D Corsair IIs, serials 71-0314 and 70-0941 are from the 23d Tactical Fighter Wing at England Air Force Base, Louisiana.)

In 1969, military requirements resulted in a change in mission when the group was reassigned from MAC transport duties to the Strategic Air Command (SAC). Under SAC the group became the 139th Air Refueling Group, equipped with the air refueling version of the C-97 transport, the Boeing KC-97 Stratofreighter. Familiarity with the aircraft led to a smooth transition from MAC to the new refueling mission. It supported the United States Air Forces in Europe (USAFE) flying aerial refueling missions in the KC-97 supporting missions of deploying aircraft to NATO for tactical exercises.

=== Tactical Airlift ===
In 1976 the KC-97s were retired by SAC and the unit was returned to MAC. The 139th was re-equipped with Lockheed C-130A Hercules tactical airlifters and returned to its transport mission. With the C-130s the 180th supported Operation Volant Oak and Operation Coronet Oak at Howard Air Force Base, Panama.

During a 180th deployment to Howard AFB in November, 1978, they were caught up in a "real world" situation when the world began to learn of the events unfolding in Jonestown, Guyana. The 180th, flying the C-130, was the first US military aircraft landing at Timehri International Airport, Guyana with US embassy officials that they had picked up in Venezuela as well as food and supplies meant for the survivors the Americans hoped to take out of Guyana. That, of course, was before it became apparent that most of the more than 900 Peoples Temple members were lying dead in Jonestown.

In December, 1989, the 180th was once again deployed at Howard AFB when Operation Just Cause began. The 180th flew combat mission in support of the Operation. In late 1980 and through 1983, members of the 180th embarked on a special project to enhance survivability of C-130 aircrews while flying in a hostile environment. The need for this type of training became apparent after C-130 units from the Military Airlift Command (MAC) began to participate in Exercise Red Flag at Nellis Air Force Base. It was obvious that the C-130's were not doing well against the ground and air threats posed in the Red Flag exercise. After approval from the National Guard Bureau and tacitly from Military Airlift Command (MAC), they began service test to validate the training program. After more than three service test, the program proved it worth and the Advanced Airlift Tactics Training Center was approved and instituted on 4 February 1984.

In March 1987, the 180th began to receive brand new C-130H2 Hercules aircraft replacing the C-130A model aircraft they had flown for the past ten years. In October 1987, the 180th deployed two C-130H2 aircraft supporting a United States Army Special Forces (SF) and the Royal Australian Special Air Service Regiment (SAS) in a joint personnel airdrop exercise called Badge Anvil 1987 at RAAF Learmonth, Australia. The exercise provided high altitude low opening and high altitude high opening parachute training. Since all of the airdrops occurred above 10,000 feet and as high as 24,500 feet, the 15th Physiological Training Flight, USAF, also supported the exercise and provided supplemental oxygen equipment, training and support for the training missions. Each flight was like going to the altitude chamber.

In 1989, the 180th with four C-130H2 aircraft deployed to Kimhae International Airport, Republic of Korea in support of Operation Team Spirit 1989. During the exercise, the 180th flew challenging missions including tactical resupply, fuel bladder missions, assault landings on short runways including landing on highway landing strips, numerous airdrop missions including both visual, high altitude and radar drop scenarios.

=== 1991 Gulf War ===
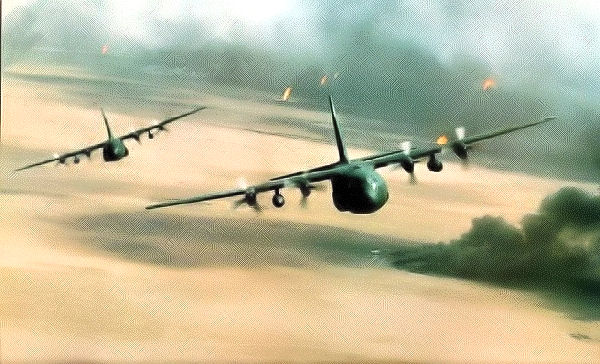
180th Tactical Airlift Squadron flying over Kuwait 1991

The group's 180th Tactical Airlift Squadron was ordered to the active service on 28 December 1990, as a result of the Iraqi invasion of Kuwait to support Operation Desert Shield. For some unit members, this would be a return to the Persian Gulf as they had volunteered and deployed with 2 C-130H aircraft, aircrews, maintenance and support personnel, to form the first Air National Guard provisional airlift squadron in September 1990. On 2 January 1991, the 180th TAS and its 8 C-130H aircraft and personnel departed Rosecrans Air National Guard Base for Al Ain Air Base, United Arab Emirates (UAE) and were redesignated as the 1632nd Tactical Airlift Squadron (Provisional) as part of the 1630th Tactical Airlift Wing (Provisional) which was under the 1610th Airlift Division (Provisional). The unit remained at Al Ain Air Base through the air war and the ground war flying combat and combat support missions in support of the allied operations. Beginning on 22 March 1991, the 180th TAS redeployed to Al Kharj Air Base, Kingdom of Saudi Arabia. The 180th TAS departed Al Kharj Air Base on 28 May 1991, and returned to Rosecrans Air National Guard Base on 30 May 1991. (Note: When the aircraft arrived home, they had "nose art" on each courtesy of the crew chiefs. The nose art was 391 "Connie Kay", 392 "Desert Possum", 393 "Spirit of St. Joe", 394 "The Hog", 395 "Chief", 396 "Buzzard", 397 "Riders on the Storm" and 398 "Fike's Filly".) The 180th TAS was relieved from active duty and released back to state control on 24 June 1991.

During the 1990s, the 180th provided airlift support to the United States Air Forces Europe during the airlift operations into Bosnia and Herzegovina. These operations were named Operation Provide Promise, Operation Joint Endeavor, Operation Joint Guard and Operation Joint Forge. Members of the 180th along with operations support and maintenance personnel would deploy to Rhein-Main Air Base and, after it closed, to Ramstein Air Base and assigned to "Delta Squadron". The Air National Guard would generally be responsible for a 90- or 120-day period and guard members would typically volunteer for duty for a minimum of a two- to three-week period although some would volunteer for longer periods.

=== Global War on Terrorism ===
Following the attacks on 11 September 2001, the 139th served in a support role flying missions transporting personnel and equipment in support of Operation Enduring Freedom.

The group was notified in February 2003 that its 180th Airlift Squadron would be partially mobilized as a result of the impending conflict in Iraq which would later be known as Operation Iraqi Freedom. The unit deployed in March 2003 to the Iraqi theater and later supported Operation Enduring Freedom in Afghanistan and was released from active duty in March 2006 and reverted to state control. This was a historic partial mobilization that lasted three years. The 180th remained in a state of partial activation for three years until it was released from mobilization in March 2006 and reverted to state control.

== Lineage ==
139th Military Airlift Group

- Established as the 139th Fighter Group (Air Defense) on 24 June 1960

Redesignated 139th Air Transport Group before activation and allotted to the National Guard
Activated and federal recognition on 14 April 1962
Redesignated 139th Military Airlift Group on 1 January 1966
Inactivated on 5 September 1969
Consolidated with the 139th Air Refueling Group on 31 May 1989

- Established as the 139th Air Refueling Group on 16 May 1969

Activated on 6 September 1969
Redesignated 139th Tactical Airlift Group on 1 October 1976
Consolidated with the 139th Military Airlift Group on 31 May 1991
Redesignated 139th Airlift Group on 8 April 1992
Redesignated 139th Airlift Wing on, 1 October 1995

=== Assignments ===
- 137th Air Transport Wing (later 137th Military Airlift Wing), 14 April 1962 – 5 September 1969
- 171st Air Refueling Wing, 6 September 1969
- 118th Tactical Airlift Wing, 1 October 1976
- Missouri Air National Guard, 8 April 1992

Gained by Eastern Transport Air Force, (EASTAF), Military Air Transport Service
Gained by Twenty-First Air Force, Military Airlift Command, 8 January 1966
Gained by Tactical Air Command, 6 September 1969
Gained by Military Airlift Command, 1 October 1976
Gained by Air Mobility Command, 1 June 1992
Gained by Air Combat Command, 1 October 1993
Gained by [ir Mobility Command, 1 October 1997-present

=== Components ===
- 139th Operations Group: 1 October 1995 – present

180th Air Transport Squadron (later 180th Military Airlift Squadron, 180th Air Refueling Squadron, 180th Tactical Airlift Squadron, 180th Airlift Squadron): 14 April 1962 – 5 September 1969, 6 September 1969 – 1 October 1995

=== Stations ===
- Rosecrans Memorial Airport, St Joseph, Missouri, 14 April 1962

Elements operated from: Al Ain International Airport, Al Ain, United Arab Emirates, 28 December 1990 – 24 June 1991
Designated: Rosecrans Air National Guard Base, Missouri, 1991-Present
Elements operated from Iraq and Afghanistan, March 2003-March 2006 (Operation Iraqi Freedom, Operation Enduring Freedom)

=== Aircraft ===
- C-97 Stratofreighter, 1962-1968
- KC-97 Stratofreighter, 1968-1976
- C-130A Hercules, 1976-1987
- C-130H2 Hercules, 1987–Present
