= Advanced Airlift Tactics Training Center =

Coordinates: 39.7676°N 94.9023°W

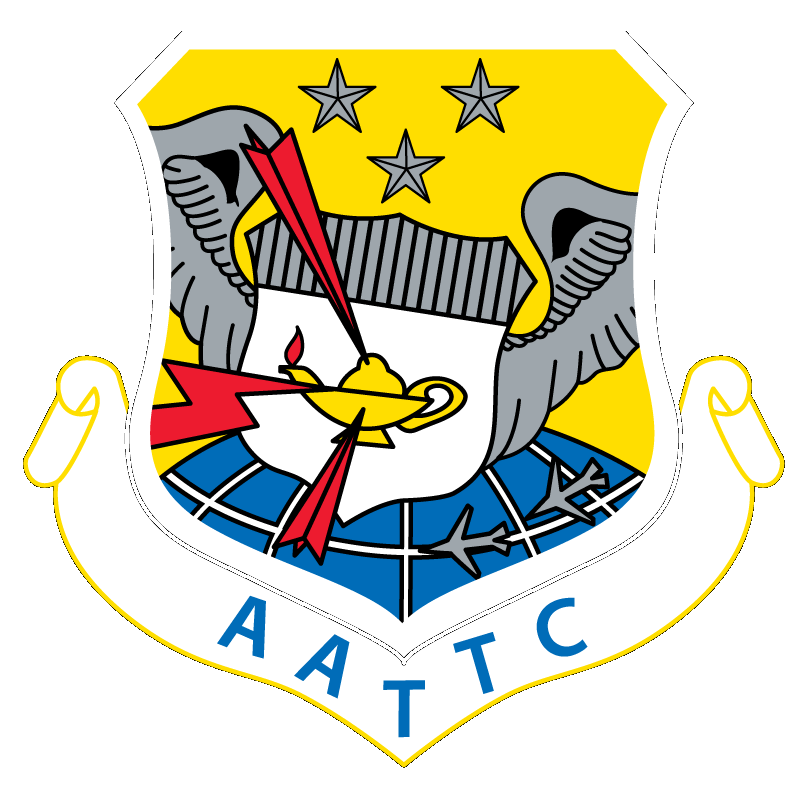
- Advanced Airlift Tactics Training Center emblem
- Active: 4 February 1984
- Country: United States
- Branch: Air National Guard and Air Force Reserve Command, United States Air Force
- Role: Airlift
- Part of: Air Mobility Command
- Garrison/HQ: Rosecrans Air National Guard Base, Saint Joseph, Missouri

The Advanced Airlift Tactics Training Center (AATTC) is located at Rosecrans Air National Guard Base, Saint Joseph, Missouri. The host unit is the 139th Airlift Wing, Missouri Air National Guard. Founded in 1983, the AATTC was the brainchild of Major Howard W. Dixon, a pilot who sought the need to establish low level combat survival training and maneuvers for C-130 aircrews; as well as the airlift community as a whole. This evasive aerial survival training had been exclusive to the fighter community up until the establishment of the AATTC, which would expand this training to C-130 aircrews. The school would continue to evolve with the combined efforts of the technicians, AGR's and members of the 180th Airlift Squadron.

== Mission ==
The mission of the Advanced Airlift Tactics Training Center (AATTC) is increasing the warfighting effectiveness and survivability of mobility forces. The AATTC is entering its fourth decade of providing advanced tactical training to airlift aircrews from the Air National Guard, Air Force Reserve Command, Air Mobility Command, Air Combat Command, Pacific Air Force, United States Air Forces in Europe, Air Force Special Operations Command, United States Marine Corps, and 18 allied nations. Through a Total Force Initiative, AATTC also provides Tactics Analysis, Tactics Development, and Electronic Warfare Development for the AMC, ANG, & AFRC mobility community. AATTC is also the office of primary responsibility for AMC's tactics improvement process. The AATTC functions as a clearinghouse for gathering and disseminating airlift tactics information. Since 1983, the AATTC has hosted an annual tactics symposium in St. Joseph, MO. Attendees from all branches of the Department of Defense as well as government contractors and multiple allied nations are represented. Serving as the cornerstone for aircraft tactics, the AATTC has maintained a reputation as the mobility air force's "Tactics Center of Excellence" since its inception.

== Advanced Tactics Aircrew Course (ATAC) ==
The AATTC offers a nine-day Advanced Tactics Aircrew Course, formerly known as the Aircrew Course. The academic phase is designed to familiarize the crewmember with the basic principles and tactics for operating an airlift aircraft in a hostile environment. Platform instruction is one method used to teach the basic and advanced concepts to crewmembers. The ground training includes briefings on Air/Ground Operations, Low Level Employment, Low Level Awareness Training, Low Level Dynamics, Structures, Enemy Air/Ground Threats, Tactical Formation Maneuvering, and other "need to know" areas. Additionally, instructors constantly reinforce the learning objectives during mission planning and in-flight. This, in conjunction with the simulated hostile environment scenario flying sorties, will generate the familiarization required to promote mission success and increase the individual crewmember's ability to survive actual hostile environment missions.

The flying training consists of two primary phases, The Eastern Phase (Missouri) and the Western Phase (Arizona). The Eastern Phase consists of two low level tactical missions during which, the aircrews are scheduled to airdrop one actual Heavy Equipment (HE) load and one actual High Velocity Container Delivery System (Hi-V CDS) bundle. The Western Phase consists of two Low Level Awareness Training (LLAT) sorties, one Dissimilar Defensive Maneuvering (DDM) sortie, two Low Level Navigation Training (LLNT) sorties and one Hostile Environment Training (HET) sortie. Actual airdrops and actual combat off/on loads (COL) are also incorporated into the Western phase. During both phases the aircrews fly against simulated SAM and AAA ground threats, as well as actual air threats. Audiovisual personnel record the evasive maneuvering of the response to the simulated threats on videotape which is used to provide feedback to the aircrews during debriefings.

The AATTC also trains qualified USMC and Special Operations Forces (SOF) aircrews. These SOF aircrews include MC-130 Combat Talon, AC-130 Spectre gunship aircrews and Combat Search and Rescue HC-130 Air Rescue Service . The AATTC also trains USAF and AFRC C-17 aircrews, C-130(H)(J) aircrews from Australia, Belgium, Canada, Great Britain, Italy, Israel, New Zealand, Norway, Portugal, Spain and Sweden, as well as C-160 crews from Germany, G-222 crews from Italy AND C295 crews from Spain.

The AATTC course is listed in AFC 36-2223 (USAF Formal Schools Catalog) as AATTC - Advanced Airlift Tactics Training Center and is assigned PDS code 6S4.

== Night Vision Goggle (NVG) Courses ==
The purpose of this course is to educate the student regarding night vision goggle (NVG) design considerations and operational applications. In the process, the student should gain an appreciation of their limitations as well as their capabilities. The goal of this course is for the student to acquire knowledge that will enhance the level of learning during simulator and/or flight training. The goal from all NVG training is to prepare the aircrew to fly the NVG mission safely and effectively.

Airland - This training program is designed to allow C-130 single ship NVG operations flown in visual meteorological conditions (VMC) to reduced overt or covert lit airfields using normal landing and takeoff procedures. Assault procedures are not used. Aircraft must be equipped with NVG lighting or modified with a temporary NVG lighting harness. The academic phase of the NVG Airland Course addresses C-130 specific considerations, NVG mission planning, and route study. These include a complete review of the AMC Airland Checklist, thoroughly planning all aspects of NVG Airland (departure, arrival, go-around, random steep, etc.), calculation of the airfield MSA and when to use it and identification of all potential obstacles with specific means of avoidance. We stress that the crews determine a go-around point for all landings. We also focus on interior and exterior aircraft lighting, cultural lighting, and CRM. Ground Operations is also incorporated in the Airland Operations Training program.

The flying training is conducted at our Arizona location and consists of two sorties. Emphasis in-flight is on crew coordination, checklist usage, and a discussion on emergency procedures. The profiles include multiple NVG Takeoffs/Landings, Visual Straight-Ins, NVG ARAs, NVG Go-Arounds and Random Steeps.

NVG Assault Operations - The AATTC has received approval from Air Mobility Command (AMC), National Guard Bureau (NGB), and Air Force Reserve Command (AFRC) to conduct NVG Assault training. The training involves both ground and flight training and covers the following areas:

- Objective area analysis
- Altitude Planning
- Tactical Approaches
- Energy Management
- Tactical Considerations
- Crew Resource Management (CRM) Techniques
- Emergency Procedures

    - This course is no longer offered by the AATTC***

== Intelligence Formal Training Unit (IFTU) Course ==
The AATTC C-130 Intelligence Formal Training Unit (IFTU) Course is designed to prepare C-130 Intelligence personnel with the skills and knowledge required to immediately support C-130 operations upon arrival at their unit. The students get an in-depth indoctrination in the C-130 Weapon System to include Defensive Systems and Night Vision Devices employment. Students closely interact with C-130 aircrews attending the Aircrew Course and are able to fly on tactical training sorties. The course is conducted at three locations, beginning with a visit to the Threat Working Group, TACC, and AMC/IN at Scott AFB, IL, it continues at the AATTC in St Joseph, MO, and finally at the AATTC Facility at Ft Huachuca, AZ. The course length is 2 weeks 5 days, including two travel days.

The C-130 IFTU Course is open to intelligence personnel currently assigned to a C-130 unit with less than one year time on station, or personnel identified for assignment to a C-130 unit. The course is open to intelligence personnel assigned to the Air National Guard, Air Force Reserve Command and Active Duty. The applicants must also be graduates of the Intelligence School at Goodfellow AFB or comparable AFSC awarding course, and have a valid SECRET security clearance. **** This Course is no longer offered at the AATTC ****

== Practical Intelligence Course (PIC) ==
Our Practical Intelligence Course (PIC) program is designed to provide aircrews and Intelligence support personnel with ground and flight training, which will enhance the aircrews' chances for survival and mission success within hostile flying environments. It gives AMC intelligence personnel mission oriented academics and planning exercise as well as the experience of working closely with aircrews and flying on tactical missions. The goal is to develop and enhance individual intelligence skills to ensure their contribution as a member of the tactics-operations-intelligence team. AMC intelligence personnel will be well-trained professionals in partnership with tactics and operations functions. This course fills a vital need in the intelligence training cycle. The first week of instruction is set in the classroom and is used to explore the different avenues of intelligence as it pertains to the airlift community. The second week of instruction demonstrates the practical application of intelligence by integrating the intelligence students with the airlift crews. This gives the opportunity for the intelligence students and the aircrew to exchange information. This training includes: Preparation for Deployments, Message Processing, Debriefing and Reporting, Military Airlift Capabilities & C-130 Safety, a Situation briefing exercise, a mission briefing exercise, and other "need to know" areas. The PIC attendees will provide the intelligence scenario and then accompany the crew on the mission. This provides the PIC attendees with a valuable insight as to how the airlift aircrews use intelligence information to accomplish their mission. In addition to teaching the specific items listed in the curriculum this course strives to develop a "total" intelligence person by developing their leadership skills, instilling confidence, and directing their energy to provide high quality intelligence support to their unit. **** This course is no longer offered at the AATTC ****
