= Rosecrans Air National Guard Base =

Military base

- Near St. Joseph, Missouri in the United States
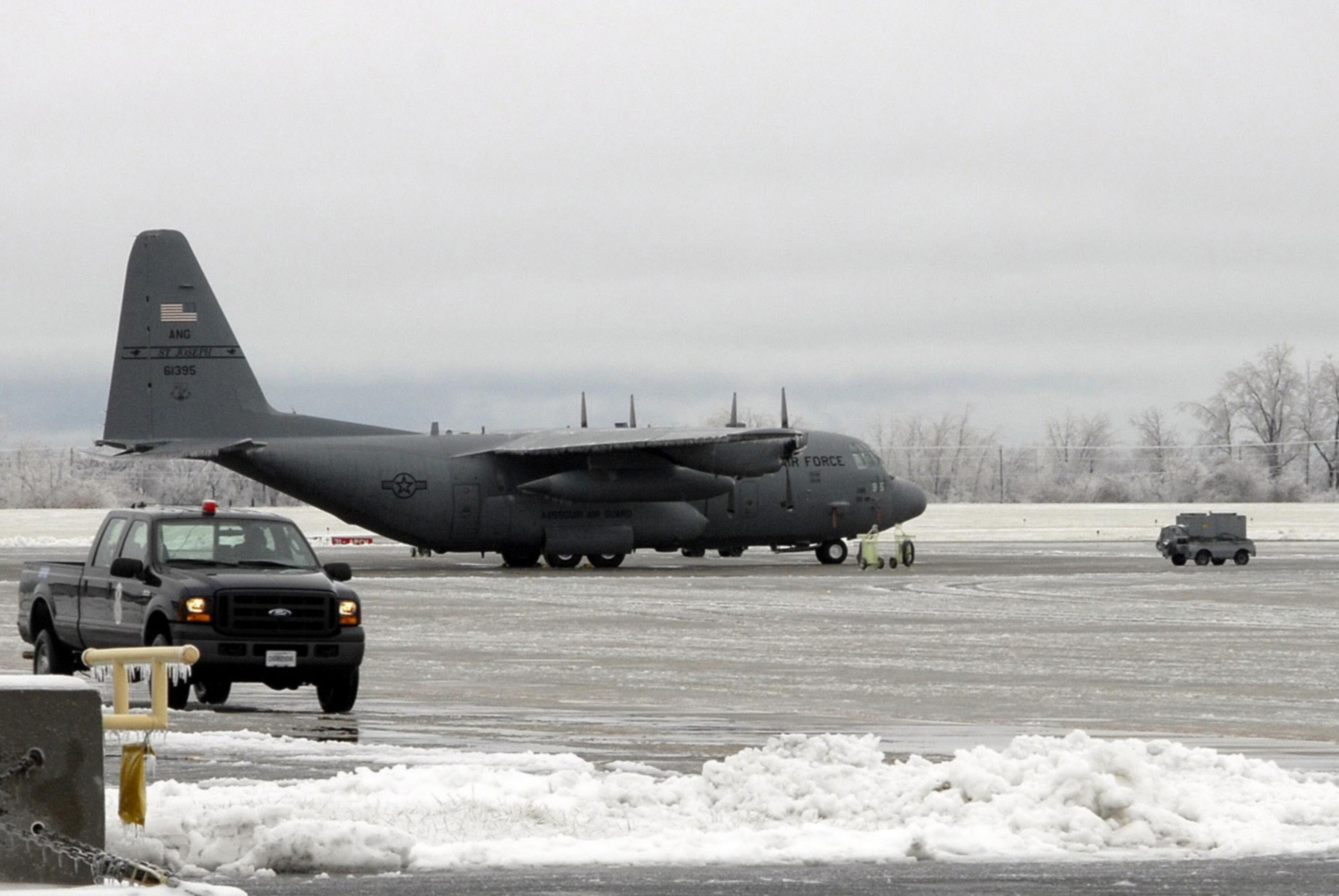
- C-130H Hercules 86-1395 of the Missouri Air National Guard's 139th Airlift Wing at Rosecrans ANGB.

Site information
- Type: Air National Guard Base
- Owner: Department of Defense
- Operator: US Air Force (USAF)
- Controlled by: Missouri Air National Guard (ANG)
- Condition: Operational
- Website: www.139aw.ang.af.mil

Location
- Location in the United States
- Coordinates: 39°46′19″N 094°54′34″W

Site history
- Built: 1940s (as St. Joseph Army Air Field)
- In use: 1940s – present

Garrison information
- Current commander: Colonel Edward E. Black
- Garrison: 139th Airlift Wing

Airfield information
- Identifiers: IATA: STJ, ICAO: KSTJ, FAA LID: STJ, WMO: 724490
- Elevation: 252 metres (827 ft) AMSL
Runways
Direction	Length and surface
17/35	2,456.9 metres (8,061 ft) Concrete
13/31	1,462.1 metres (4,797 ft) Asphalt/Concrete
- Airfield shared with Rosecrans Memorial Airport. Source: Federal Aviation Administration

Rosecrans Air National Guard Base or Rosecrans ANGB, is located on a portion of the Rosecrans Memorial Airport (IATA: STJ, ICAO: KSTJ), Saint Joseph, Missouri, USA. It is the home of the 139th Airlift Wing, Missouri Air National Guard and the Advanced Airlift Tactics Training Center. It is named in honor of Guy Wallace Rosecrans, a U.S. Army Air Service airman killed in World War I.

== History ==
During World War II, the U.S. Army Air Forces established Rosecrans Field, also called St. Joseph Army Air Field, at Rosecrans Memorial Airport. The Ferrying Division, Air Transport Command took over the field on July 6, 1942. It became the home for the 1st Operational Training Unit (OTU) composed of the 561st Army Air Force (AAF) Base Unit, Headquarters and Headquarters Squadron, 61st Aircraft Engineering Squadron, 993rd Guard Squadron, 730th AAF Band, 50th Transport Transition Squadron, Medical and WAC Detachments and the 562nd Training Squadron.

In 1947, control of the base shifted from the Army to the newly established U.S. Air Force. In 1948, the base was conveyed by the Air Force back to the City of Saint Joseph, Missouri with the exception of 142 acres (0.57 km^{2}) set aside for use by the Air National Guard organized in 1947. Some of the old temporary World War II era barracks were still present on the base until the Great Flood of 1993 when they were destroyed.

== Current use ==
The base's host wing, the 139th Airlift Wing (139 AW) of the Missouri Air National Guard, currently operates C-130H2 Hercules theater airlift aircraft and is operationally-gained by the Air Mobility Command (AMC). The Advanced Airlift Tactics Training Center (AATTC) is a tenant activity at the base that provides current academic and combat flying tactics and training to C-130 airlift air crews of the Air National Guard, the Air Force Reserve Command, active duty USAF, sister services and allied nations. This training enhances air crew survivability and mission success in a combat environment.

== See also ==
- 180th Airlift Squadron
- 241st Air Traffic Control Squadron
- Missouri Wing, Civil Air Patrol – Pony Express Composite Squadron
