= 241st Air Traffic Control Squadron =

Unit of the Missouri Air National Guard

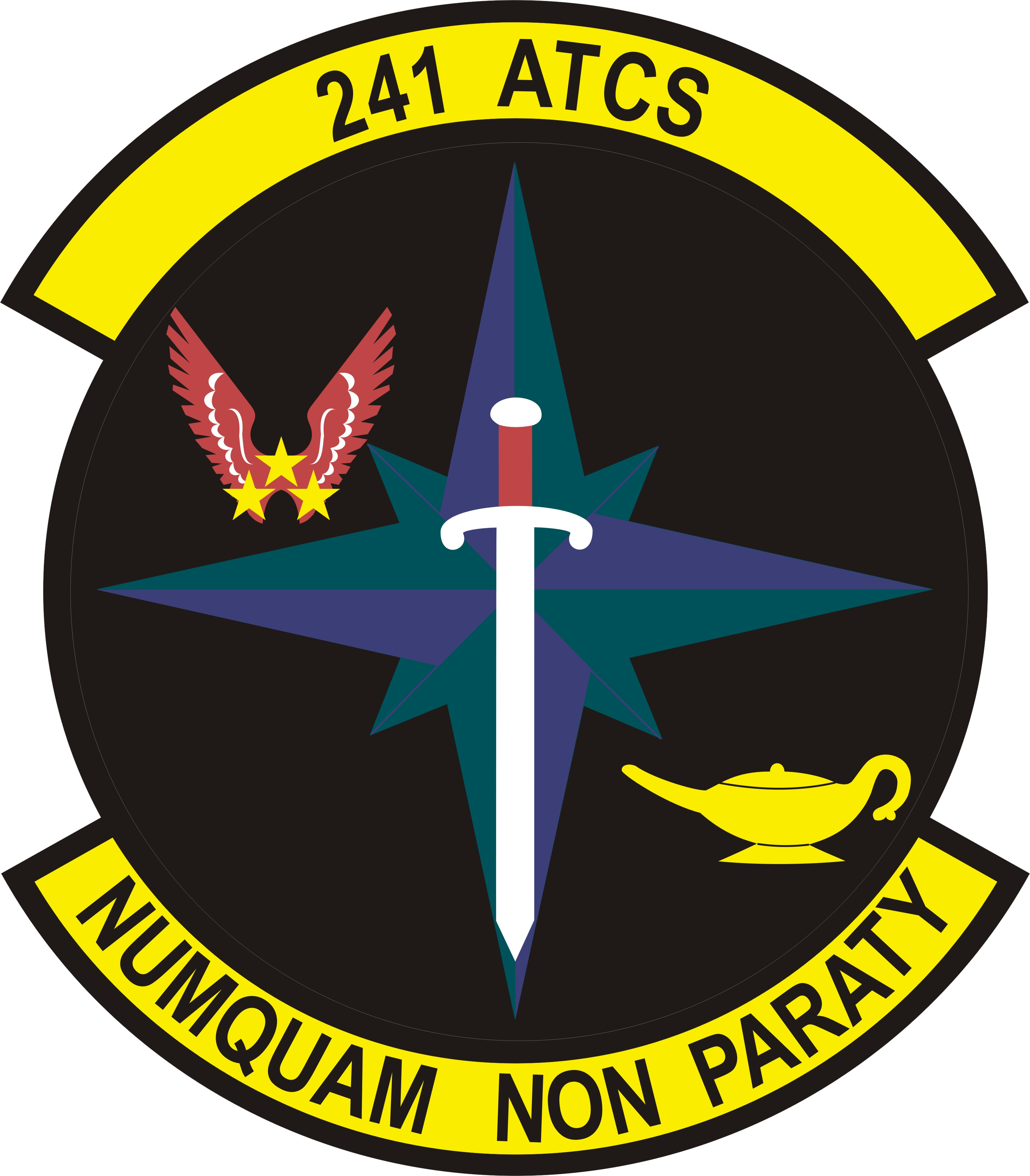
- Active: 1996 – present
- Country: United States
- Allegiance: Missouri
- Branch: Air National Guard
- Type: Unit
- Role: Mobile Air Traffic Control
- Part of: Missouri Air National Guard
- Garrison/HQ: Rosecrans Air National Guard Base, St. Joseph, MO
- Motto: "NUMQUAM NON PARATI" "NEVER UNPREPARED"

Commanders
- Current commander: Lt. Col Nathan Vanhoof

The 241st Air Traffic Control Squadron (241 ATCS) is a unit of the Missouri Air National Guard, stationed at Rosecrans Air National Guard Base, St. Joseph, Missouri. If activated to federal service, the unit is gained by the United States Air Force Air Combat Command.

== Mission ==
It is the mission of the 241st to deploy, operate, and maintain Air Traffic Control and Landing Systems (ATCALS) in support of the state of Missouri, Air National Guard or United States Air Force Requirements.

The 241st is one of only ten ANG Air Traffic Control Squadrons located throughout the United States available to deploy worldwide in support of operational forces at host nation or bare base locations and provide basic airfield services and combat airspace support to the Theater Air Operations Center (AOC). DATCALS provide the capability to identify, sequence, and separate aircraft; provide final approach guidance and control instructions to aircraft at deployed locations in all types of weather. DATCALS equipment and personnel can be employed to provide liaison, control tower, Radar Approach Control (RAPCON), precision landing capabilities, and mobile Tactical Air Navigation Aid (TACAN) services or any combination.

== Personnel and equipment ==
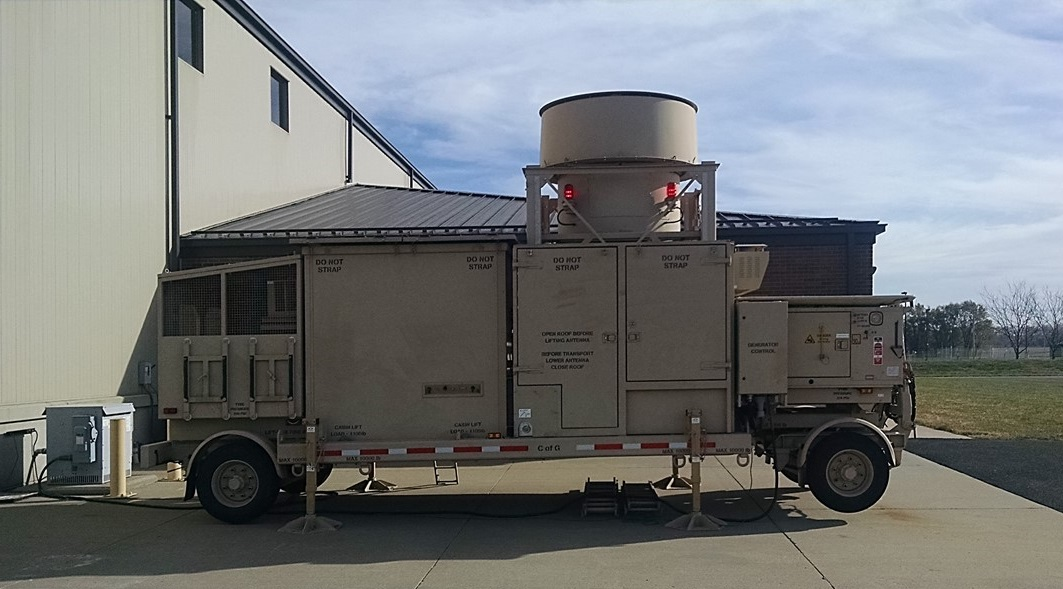
AN/TRN-48 TACAN at the 241st Air Traffic Control Squadron headquarters building

The 241st ATCS has numerous career fields including: Air Traffic Control, Airfield Systems, Ground Radar Systems, Electrical Power Production, Heating Ventilation and Air Conditioning (HVAC), Logistics Plans, Material Management Administrative, and Personnel.

Major equipment utilized by the 241st ATCS includes: the AN/MSN-7, Mobile Tower; the AN/MPN-14K, Mobile RADAR; and the AN/TRN-48, Mobile TACAN.

== History ==
=== Early years and the Balkans ===
The 241 Air Traffic Control Flight was given a change of station order in June 1996 from St. Louis to St. Joseph, Missouri. The 241 Air Traffic Control Flight was redesignated as the 241 Air Traffic Control Squadron in October 1996 and was extended federal recognition on 3 June 1997.

Between 1994 and 2001, the 241st deployed personnel and Mobile Control Tower (MSN-7) to Quincy, IL. 7 times in support of the World Freefall Convention, the largest sky diving boogey (meet) in the United States.

Members of the 241st were activated to Taszar AB, Hungary between the years of 1995 and 1996 in support of the Balkan crisis. This airlift was jointly performed with members from Cheyenne, Hawaii, and Oregon, and was the largest since Berlin.

Between 1997 and 1998 members of the unit were activated to Taszar AB, Hungary as part of the 16th Air Expeditionary Wing, 406th EOSS, in support of the Balkan crisis.

In 1999, 2 tower controllers were deployed to Balikesir Air Base, Turkey in support of Operation Noble Anvil, 2 Tower Controllers were deployed to Cervia, Italy and 1 Controller to Aviano AB, Italy in support of Operation Allied Force. 1 controller was deployed to Pordenone in support of Operation Allied Force and 5 Tower Controllers were deployed to Bandirma Air Base, Turkey in support of Operation Northern Watch.

=== Southern Watch and pre-9/11 ===
In January 2000, four Air Traffic Controllers were deployed to Prince Sultan Air Base, Saudi Arabia in support of Operation Southern Watch, AEF 9.

The Tower UTC supported the Fly-In for Ft. Leavenworth, Kansas in September 2000 with the intention of providing yearly support. The events of September 11th on the following year, however, would make the World Freefall Convention in August 2001 the last event of that kind the Squadron would support until 2007.

In June 2001, the 241st became the last Air Traffic Control Squadron to successfully deploy a complete unit and pass an Operational Readiness Inspection. All other previous ATC Squadrons had performed home station ORIs or were unable to deploy with the RADAR for their inspections.

=== Enduring Freedom/Iraqi Freedom (2001–2005) ===
In November 2001, a SMSgt from the 241st was deployed to Whiteman AFB in support of Operation Noble Eagle as a RADAR watch supervisor; he would be recalled to Rosecrans in two short months later.

On 13 January 2002, the 241st was the first Air Traffic Control Unit activated in support of Operation Enduring Freedom. The Tower UTC was deployed to Bagram, Afghanistan where they would be directly be involved in Operation Anaconda. Simultaneously, the squadron also deployed 45 (Ops/MXS) members, led by Major Gerald Bramstedt, to Pakistan. Three months later, those members were redeployed to Bagram Afghanistan where they would remain until October of that year. The site was a "bare base operation" in which the field was handed over directly from special operations controllers and was the first time an MPN14K RADAR was redeployed in the history of the Air Force. Major Bramstedt would receive the Bronze Star for his actions there.

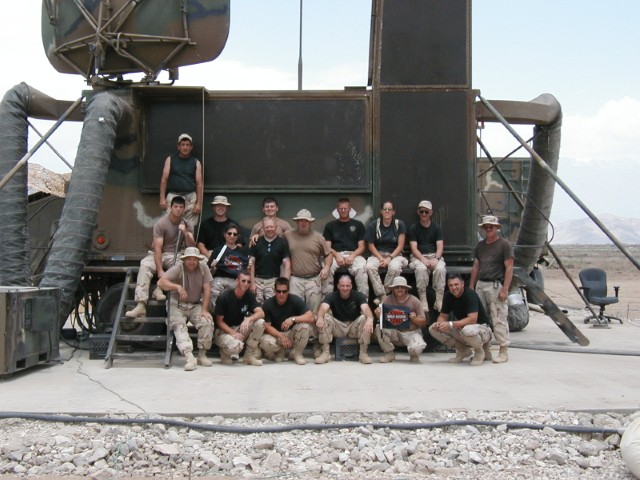
MPN14K in Bagram Afghanistan

In March 2003, three controllers were deployed to Kirkuk AB, Iraq. MSgt Letitia Whitaker received the Bronze Star for her work there, establishing the first air-control service in northern Iraq and supporting over 4,800 combat sorties, including covert operations, medical evacuations and humanitarian airlifts. She was the first woman in the Missouri Air National Guard to receive this decoration.

Also in March 2003, three members were sent to Baghdad, Iraq in support of OIF. They served as part of a team that opened Saddam International Airport to operations again soon after it was captured. 241st Personnel were the first to operate Arrival and Precision Approach services into the newly reopened Baghdad International Airport.

On 29 April 2003 CMSgt Neil Eayrs deployed for 90 days to CENTAF (US Air Forces, US Central Command) in support of Operation Enduring Freedom and Iraqi Freedom. CMSgt Eayrs received the Defense Meritorious Service Medal for his actions developing the enroute airspace for the entire AOR. He would also receive the Air Traffic Association Achievement Award; this is a civilian award received for his work in reconstructing and opening up Iraq's airspace for full utilization for both military and civilian aircraft. CMSgt Eayrs would go on to receive to Air National Guard Enlisted Manager of the Year and the US Air Force Enlisted Manager of the Year for 2003.

CMSgt Denny Albano was deployed to K2 in support of OEF and OIF for two months in November 2003. CMSgt Albano is regarded as one of, if not the best RADAR maintainer in the Air National Guard. His skills were required to repair the deployed MPN-14K RADAR.

In December 2004, 14 members of the unit were deployed to provide air traffic services at Mosul Air Base, Iraq for AEF 3 and 4.

On 3 February 2005, the 241st ATCS lost its only member to the war. Ryan Hogan was aboard an Afghanistan Kam Air jet that crashed en route to Kabul Afghanistan.

=== 2005–2015 ===
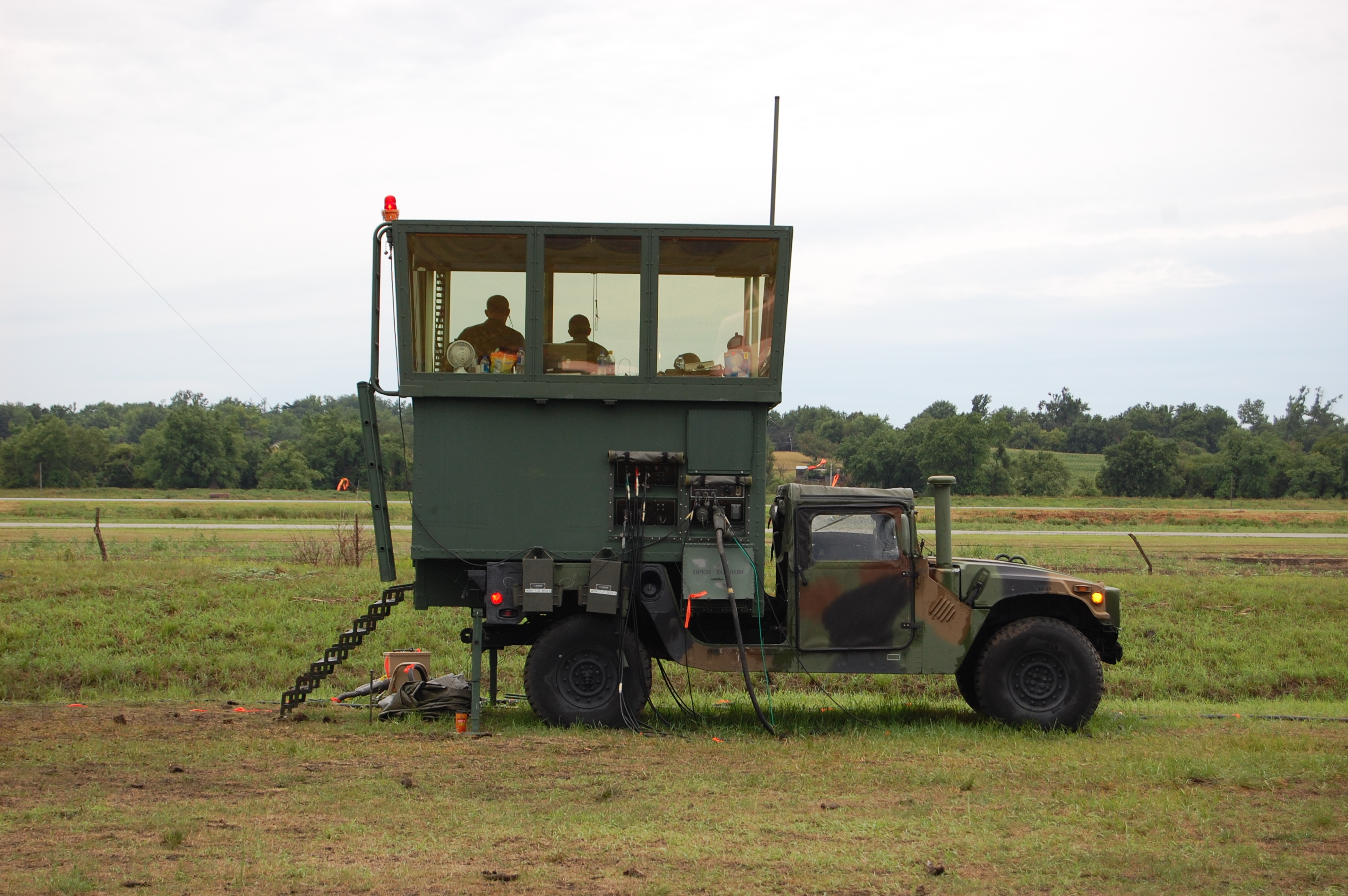
EAA Chapter 1405 Fly In and Wingnuts Flying Circus

To date, the 241st Air Traffic Control Squadron has deployed over 70 members in support of OEF and OIF. Several of these members have deployed more than once, and in several different capacities, functioning as everything from Staffing Support to Airfield Operations Flight Officer.

Since 2005, members have been activated in support of several homeland security and contingency support operations such as Operation Noble Eagle at NAS Key West, Operation Jump Start on the Arizona border, Emerald Warrior/Jaded Thunder in Avon Park, Fl. and Operation Coronet Oak at Muñiz Air National Guard Base.

In September 2005, members of the 241st were relocated to St. Louis MO in support of the Hurricane Katrina Relief Operation. Two Power Production and HVAC experts assisted in building shelters and showers for refugees and supplied the hospital with air conditioning.

Since 2007, the Tower UTC has supported the EAA Chapter 1405 Fly-In and Wingnuts Flying Circus Airshow in Tarkio, MO, a Fly-in hosted by Missouri Congressman Sam Graves. The mobile air traffic control tower typically serves over 800 VFR arrival and departure aircraft during the six hour period they have control of the airspace.

Members of the 241st were activated during the January 2007 North American Ice Storm in support of relief efforts. Airmen went door to door, checking on the wellness of citizens that were left without power and assisting those in need to local shelters. The 241st also deployed generators to designated areas, where Power Production personnel would utilize them to supply power to neighborhoods who were left without.

When the 2011 Missouri River Flood threatened the city of St. Joseph and Rosecrans Air National Guard Base, the 241st was activated to relocate military assets, conduct levee patrols and security, and assist with evacuation support and search and rescue operations. Nearly every member of the unit worked tirelessly, day and night, for several days filling, transporting, and stacking sandbags to keep the oncoming water at bay.

=== 2016–present ===
In August 2016 The 241st Air Traffic Control Squadron hosted delegates from the country of Panama, including members of the Panamanian National Police Force, through a Guard State Partnership Program to assist with temporary shelter and shelter when responding to emergency situations.

Members of the 241st were activated to respond to civil unrest in St. Louis MO following the acquittal of former St. Louis police officer Jason Stockley.

Fourteen members of the unit deployed for six months in September 2017 to Al Asad Airbase in Iraq in support of Operation Inherent Resolve. This was the unit's first AEF tasking since 2012.

In October 2017, 21 personnel from the 241st ATCS, along with two members of the 270th Air Traffic Control Squadron, deployed for 34 days to Ponce, Puerto Rico in support of Hurricane Maria recovery efforts. The group was operational a total of 29 days at the Mercedita Airport, handling over 1500 total aircraft operations and assisting in the delivery of nearly 375 tons of food and water to the island.

== Operating locations ==
Within the United States, the 241st ATCS has participated in operations in Missouri, Alaska, Arizona, Florida, Georgia, Hawaii, Illinois, Kansas, Michigan, New Jersey, North Carolina, Ohio, Puerto Rico, South Carolina, Utah, Wisconsin, and Wyoming.

Internationally, the 241st ATCS has participated in operations in Afghanistan, Germany, Hungary, Iraq, Italy, Jordan, Kuwait, Kyrgyzstan, Pakistan, Qatar, Saudi Arabia, Syria, Turkey, United Arab Emirates, the United Kingdom, Niger, Djibouti, and Uzbekistan.

== Emblem ==
Designed by SSG Phillip A. Gregory, a member of the squadron, this emblem was approved and adopted as the official historical emblem of the 241st ATCS by the Institute of Heraldry, United States Army in November 1998. The 241 Air Traffic Control Squadron Emblem is intended to symbolize the squadron and its readiness to support Air Force, Air National Guard, and the State of Missouri missions. The elements of the emblem have a variety of symbolic meanings. Per The Pentagon:

Ultramarine blue and Air Force yellow are the Air Force colors. Blue alludes to the sky, the primary theater of Air Force operations. Yellow refers to the sun and the excellence required of Air Force personnel. The compass rose indicates the unit's worldwide deployment capabilities. The downward pointing sword signifies the execution of mission. The wings and stars symbolize the deployment of personnel in administration, maintenance and operations. The lamp refers to the Squadron's training service functions.

== Awards ==
- 1 January 1999 – Colonel Charles R. Stahl Award
- 24 December 1999 – Air Force Outstanding Unit Award
- 1 January 2002 – Colonel Charles R. Stahl Award
- 8 January 2002 – Air Force Outstanding Unit Award
- 1 January 2003 – Colonel Charles R. Stahl Award
- 3 January 2005 – Air Force Outstanding Unit Award
- 27 February 2008 – Air Force Outstanding Unit Award
- 1 July 2013 – Air Force Outstanding Unit Award
- 31 October 2016 – Air Force Outstanding Unit Award

== Community involvement and squadron functions ==
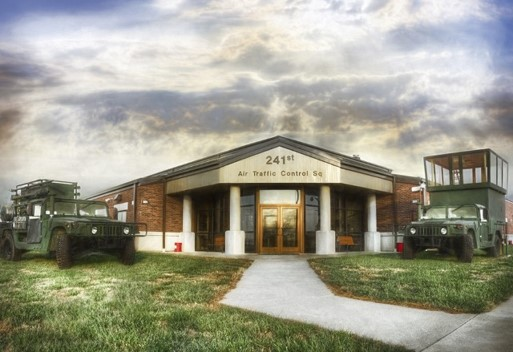
Headquarters building for the 241st Air Traffic Control Squadron in St. Joseph, Missouri

Since 2002, the Squadron has adopted a needy family each year during the Christmas time frame ensuring that the family has a good holiday. Many members of the 241st support local programs as mentors, youth coaches, and community leaders.

Since 1997, the 241st ATCS has hosted an annual retiree and awards banquet, in which current members are presented with awards for their achievements and former members are recognized for their service.

== Change of command ==
- Lt. Col. Craig McCord (March 1998 – October 2002): As a 239th Combat Communications Squadron prior enlisted controller, Lt. Col. McCord became the first full-time Commander of the 241st. Lt. Col. McCord oversaw the deployment of 241st personnel and equipment for Operations Joint Guard, Allied Force, and Enduring Freedom, as well as numerous exercises and inspections. After relinquishing command of the 241st for a State Headquarters position. There he would rise to the rank of Brigadier General, serving as the Chief of Staff and Commander of the Missouri Air National Guard. Additionally he served as the National Guards Strategic Planning System and was also designated as a Joint Task Commander for contingency response.
- Lt. Col. Gerald Bramstedt (February 2003 – January 2009): Lt. Col. Bramstedt was an enlisted member of the 239th Combat Communications Squadron, stationed at Lambert AFB, St. Louis, Mo. before receiving his commission. He served as an Assistant ATC Operations Officer during Operation Joint Forge and an ATC Operations Officer for Operations Joint Guard and Operation Enduring Freedom. Lt. Col. Bramstedt also deployed in support of Operation Allied Force and received the Bronze Star for his efforts during OEF Bagram AB, Afghanistan.
- Major John Howie (January 2009 – July 2014): Major Howie enlisted in the Missouri Air National Guard in 1993 and transferred with the 241st to St. Joseph, Missouri in 1997. As an enlisted airman, he rose to the rank of Master Sergeant before receiving his commission. He deployed in support of several operations including Joint Guard, Allied Force, and Iraqi Freedom. He deployed twice as an Airfield Operations Flight Officer and Director of Operations for Operations Support Squadrons in support of Operation Iraqi Freedom.
- Major Patrick Shelton (July 2014 – May 2015): Major Shelton enlisted in the US Air Force in Omaha NE, in October 1988. He started his career as an air traffic control specialist assigned to 52ndFW, Spangdahlem AB Germany. Follow on assignments included Homestead AFB, FL, and Offutt AFB, NE. Major Shelton exited active duty in October 1994 to pursue a teaching degree. Major Shelton enlisted in the Missouri Air National Guard as a Senior Airman in August 1998, once again serving as an air traffic controller, this time in the 241ATCS in St. Joseph Mo. Major Shelton's career progressed to the rank of TSgt until receiving his commission as a Lieutenant in June 2003. Major Shelton was activated or deployed for Operations Allied Force (Kosovo air campaign) 1999, Enduring Freedom (Afghanistan war) 2002, Deepwater Horizon (Gulf of Mexico oil spill response) 2010. Patrick Shelton left the 241st in 2016 to assume the position of Commander for the 139th AW Communications Flight.
- Lt. Col. Nathan Vanhoof (May 2015 – present): Maj Vanhoof transferred from the Louisiana Air National Guard where he was the Chief of Operations for the 259th Air Traffic Control Squadron. In Louisiana, he assisted in the direction of relief efforts for Hurricanes Katrina in 2005 and Gustav in 2008. Maj Vanhoof assumed command of the 241st ATCS in May 2015 and deployed with 13 members of the unit in September 2017.
