= Missouri Air National Guard =

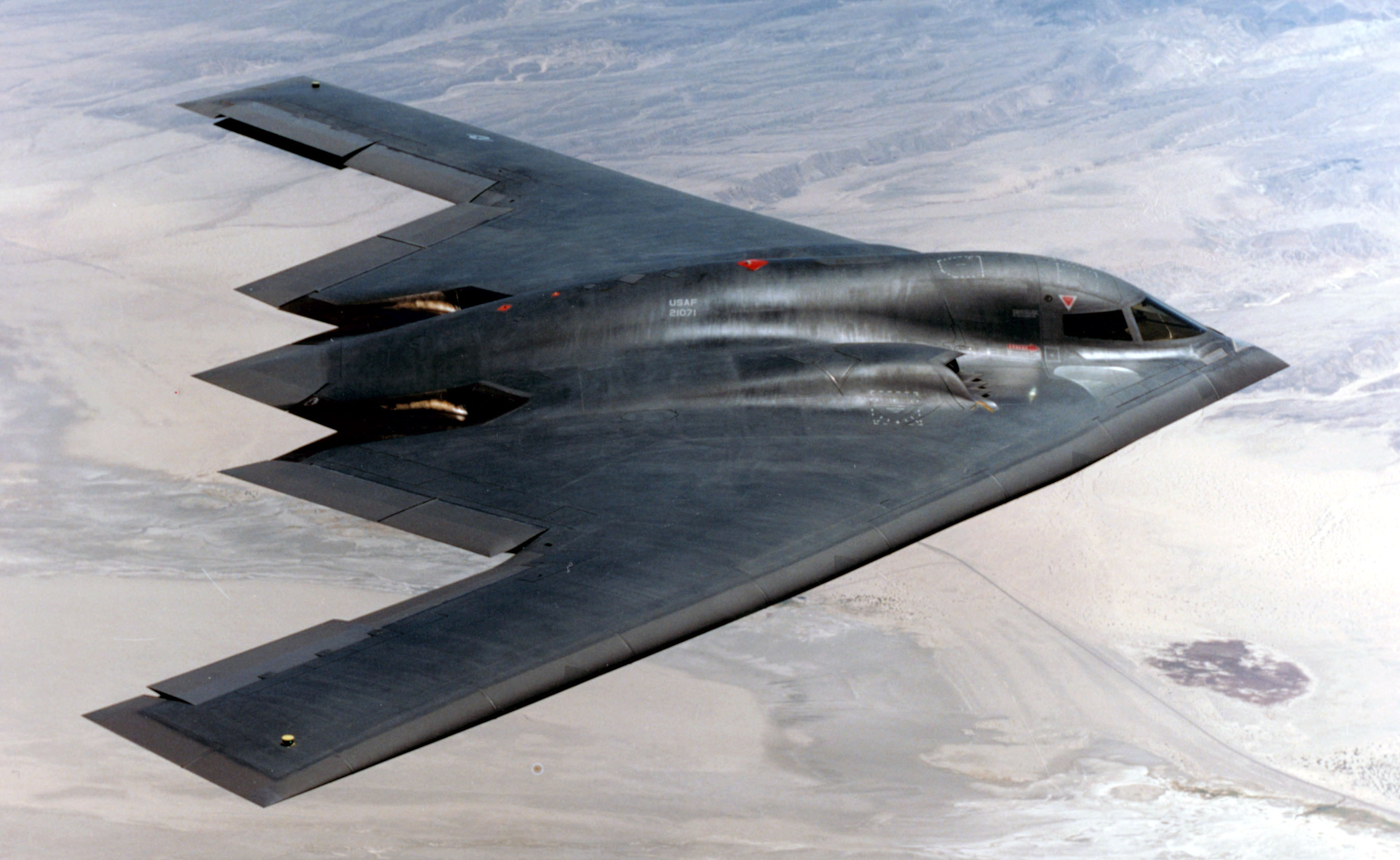
- A B-2 Spirit operated by the 110th Bomb Squadron at Whiteman AFB, Knob Noster. The 110th BS is the oldest unit in the Missouri Air National Guard, having over 80 years of service to the state and nation.
- Active: 23 June 1923 - present
- Country: United States
- Allegiance: Missouri
- Branch: Air National Guard
- Type: State militia, military reserve force
- Role: "To meet state and federal mission responsibilities."
- Part of: Missouri National Guard; United States National Guard Bureau
- Garrison/HQ: Missouri Air National Guard, Rosecrans Air National Guard Base, St. Joseph, Missouri, 60543
- Engagements: World War I; World War II; Korean War; Operation Just Cause; Gulf War; Operation Desert Shield; Operation Desert Storm; Operation Joint Forge; Operation Joint Guardian; Operation Northern Watch; Operation Southern Watch; Operation Noble Eagle; Operation Enduring Freedom; Operation Iraqi Freedom; Operation Freedom Sentinel; Operation Spartan Shield; Operation Inherent Resolve; Iran–Israel war; Operation Midnight Hammer

Commanders
- Civilian leadership: President Donald Trump; (Commander-in-Chief); Frank Kendall III; (Secretary of the Air Force); Governor Mike Kehoe; (Governor of the State of Missouri)
- Ceremonial chief: Major General Levon Cumpton (Adjutant General of Missouri); Major General Levon Cumpton (Commander Missouri Air National Guard)

Insignia
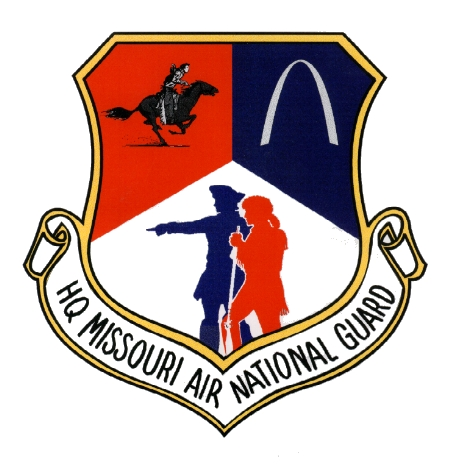
- Emblem of the Missouri Air National Guard

Aircraft flown
- Bomber: B-2 Spirit
- Transport: C-130H2 Hercules

The Missouri Air National Guard (MO ANG) is the aerial militia of the State of Missouri, United States of America. It is a reserve of the United States Air Force and, along with the Missouri Army National Guard, an element of the Missouri National Guard of the larger United States National Guard Bureau.

As state militia units, the units in the Missouri Air National Guard are not in the normal United States Air Force chain of command. They are under the jurisdiction of the governor of Missouri through the office of the Missouri Adjutant General unless they are federalized by order of the president of the United States. The Missouri Air National Guard is headquartered at Rosecrans Air National Guard Base, St. Joseph, and its commander is currently Major General Levon E. Cumpton.

== Overview ==
Under the "Total Force" concept, Missouri Air National Guard units are considered to be Air Reserve Components (ARC) of the United States Air Force (USAF). Missouri ANG units are trained and equipped by the Air Force and are operationally gained by a major command of the USAF if federalized. In addition, the Missouri Air National Guard forces are assigned to Air Expeditionary Forces and are subject to deployment tasking orders along with their active duty and Air Force Reserve counterparts in their assigned cycle deployment window.

Along with their federal reserve obligations, as state militia units the elements of the Missouri ANG are subject to being activated by order of the governor to provide protection of life and property, and preserve peace, order and public safety. State missions include disaster relief in times of earthquakes, hurricanes, floods and forest fires, search and rescue, protection of vital public services, and support to civil defense.

== Components ==
The Missouri Air National Guard consists of the following major units:

- 131st Bomb Wing

Established 23 June 1923 (as: 110th Observation Squadron); operates: B-2 Spirit
Stationed at: Whiteman Air Force Base, Knob Noster
Gained by: Air Force Global Strike Command
The only Air National Guard B-2 Spirit Wing, the 131st Bomb Wing's mission is to bring massive firepower to bear, in a short time, anywhere on the globe through previously impenetrable defenses.

- 139th Airlift Wing

Established 22 August 1946 (as: 180th Bombardment Squadron); operates: C-130H2 Hercules
Stationed at: Rosecrans Air National Guard Base, St. Joseph
Gained by: Air Mobility Command
The 139th Airlift Wing provides the State of Missouri and the nation with immediately deployable, combat-ready C-130H2 Hercules model aircraft. The 139th remains globally engaged in continuing operations.

Support Unit Functions and Capabilities:

- 157th Air Operations Group

Involves work to provide meteorological support and deploy with, advise, and assist the ground force commander in planning, requesting, coordinating and controlling close air support, tactical air reconnaissance, and tactical airlift.

- 231st Civil Engineer Flight

Headquarters Augmentation Unit provides staff augmentation, project management, engineering support and construction oversight.

- 239th Combat Communications Squadron

Tactical communications unit that engineers, plans, installs, and restores cyberspace and expeditionary communications capabilities enabling joint C2.

== History ==
The Missouri Air National Guard origins date to 14 August 1917 with the establishment of the 110th Aero Squadron as part of the World War I United States Army Air Service. After the 1918 Armistice with Germany the squadron was demobilized in 1919.

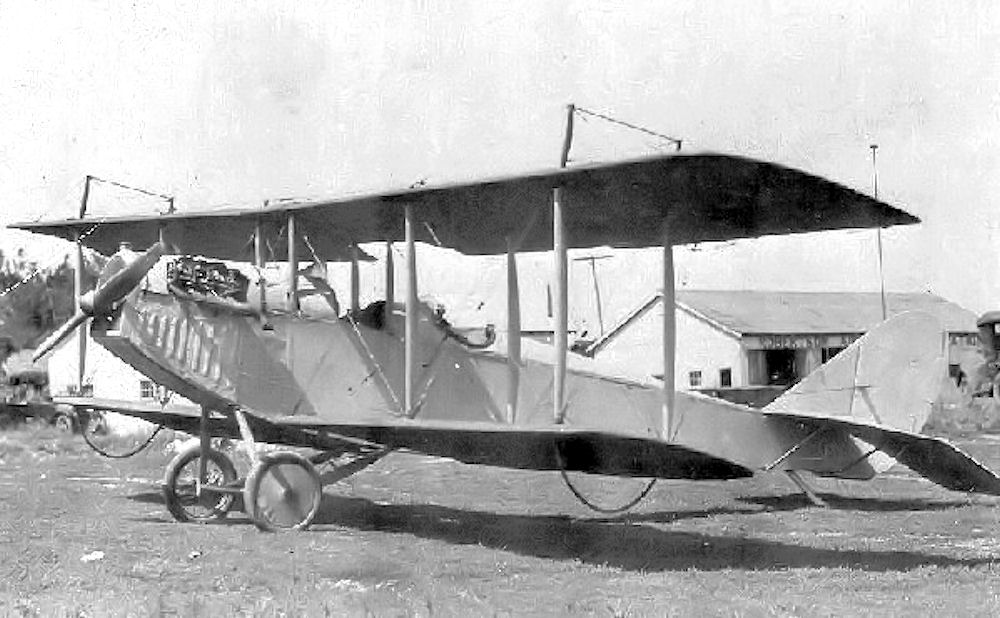
This Curtiss JN-4 "Jenny" was the first plane for the Missouri Air National Guard. It was purchased by the officers and men of the 110th Observation Squadron in 1923.

The Militia Act of 1903 established the present National Guard system, units raised by the states but paid for by the Federal Government, liable for immediate state service. If federalized by Presidential order, they fall under the regular military chain of command. On 1 June 1920, the Militia Bureau issued Circular No.1 on organization of National Guard air units.

Early in 1923, a group of local St. Louis aviation enthusiasts including Major William B. Robertson and his brothers Frank and Dan, went to Washington to seek support for selection of St. Louis as the site for the "International Air Races" and a charter for organization of an Army National Guard Air Unit for the state, Their mission was successful and they returned with the approval for both activities. The interest which St. Louis had shown as an aviation center and recommendation of Col. C.S. Thornton, then 138th Infantry Regiment Commander, largely influenced Brig. Gen. W.A. Raupp, Missouri National Guard Commander in selection of St. Louis as site for the Air Unit.

Local newspapers informed the public that "enlistments would not be limited to aviators but a number of young men who wanted to learn to fly or maintain flying equipment would also be taken." Members would be paid for a maximum of 60 "drills" a year which were described as periods of instruction in ground work, machine-shop practice and flying. War maneuvers would be taught and bombing and machine gun firing would be directed at targets on the nearby Missouri River. Personnel assigned to the Photo Section would learn to make pictures for use in war and intelligence Personnel would be trained as Scouts of the Air (observers) and probably will have radio equipment.

A five-day "recruiting drive" enlisted a total of 110 men, most of whom were World War I veterans. On June 23, 1923 the 110th Observation Squadron, 110th Photo Section and 110th Intelligence Section, 35th Division (Aviation), Missouri National Guard were federally recognized. It is one of the 29 original National Guard Observation Squadrons of the United States Army National Guard formed before World War II. The 110th Observation Squadron was ordered into active service on 23 December 1940 as part of the buildup of the Army Air Corps.

On 24 May 1946, the United States Army Air Forces, in response to dramatic postwar military budget cuts imposed by President Harry S. Truman, allocated inactive unit designations to the National Guard Bureau for the formation of an Air Force National Guard. These unit designations were allotted and transferred to various State National Guard bureaus to provide them unit designations to re-establish them as Air National Guard units.

The modern Missouri ANG received federal recognition on 3 July 1946 as the 71st Fighter Wing at Lambert Field, St. Louis. The 131st Fighter Group and its 110th Fighter Squadron received federal recognition on 15 July. The 110th Fighter Squadron was equipped with F-51D Mustangs, and the mission of the Missouri ANG was the air defense of the state. The 180th Bombardment Squadron (Light) at Rosecrans Memorial Airport, St Joseph, was federally recognized on 22 August 1946, being equipped with B-26 Invader light bombers. The 180th was also assigned to the 131st Fighter Group, being gained by Tactical Air Command. 18 September 1947, however, is considered the Missouri Air National Guard's official birth concurrent with the establishment of the United States Air Force as a separate branch of the United States military under the National Security Act.

Today, the 131st Bomb Wing, now at Whiteman AFB is the only Air National Guard B-2 Spirit Wing, being an associate unit of the USAF 509th Bomb Wing. The 139th Airlift Wing provides the State of Missouri and the nation with immediately deployable, combat-ready C-130H2 Hercules model aircraft.

After the September 11th, 2001 terrorist attacks on the United States, elements of every Air National Guard unit in Missouri has been activated in support of the global war on terrorism. Flight crews, aircraft maintenance personnel, communications technicians, air controllers and air security personnel were engaged in Operation Noble Eagle air defense overflights of major United States cities. Also, Missouri ANG units have been deployed overseas as part of Operation Enduring Freedom in Afghanistan and Operation Iraqi Freedom in Iraq as well as other locations as directed.

In 2008 after 86 years of flying operations in St. Louis in an End of Era ceremony coinciding with the closure of the base fire house and the 131st Fighter Wing's final F-15C Eagle departure from Lambert International Airport, the Headquarters of the Missouri Air National Guard moved from Jefferson Barracks, St. Louis to its new home at Rosecrans Air National Guard Base, St. Joseph.

== See also ==
- Missouri State Defense Force
- Missouri Wing Civil Air Patrol
