= 494th Fighter Squadron =

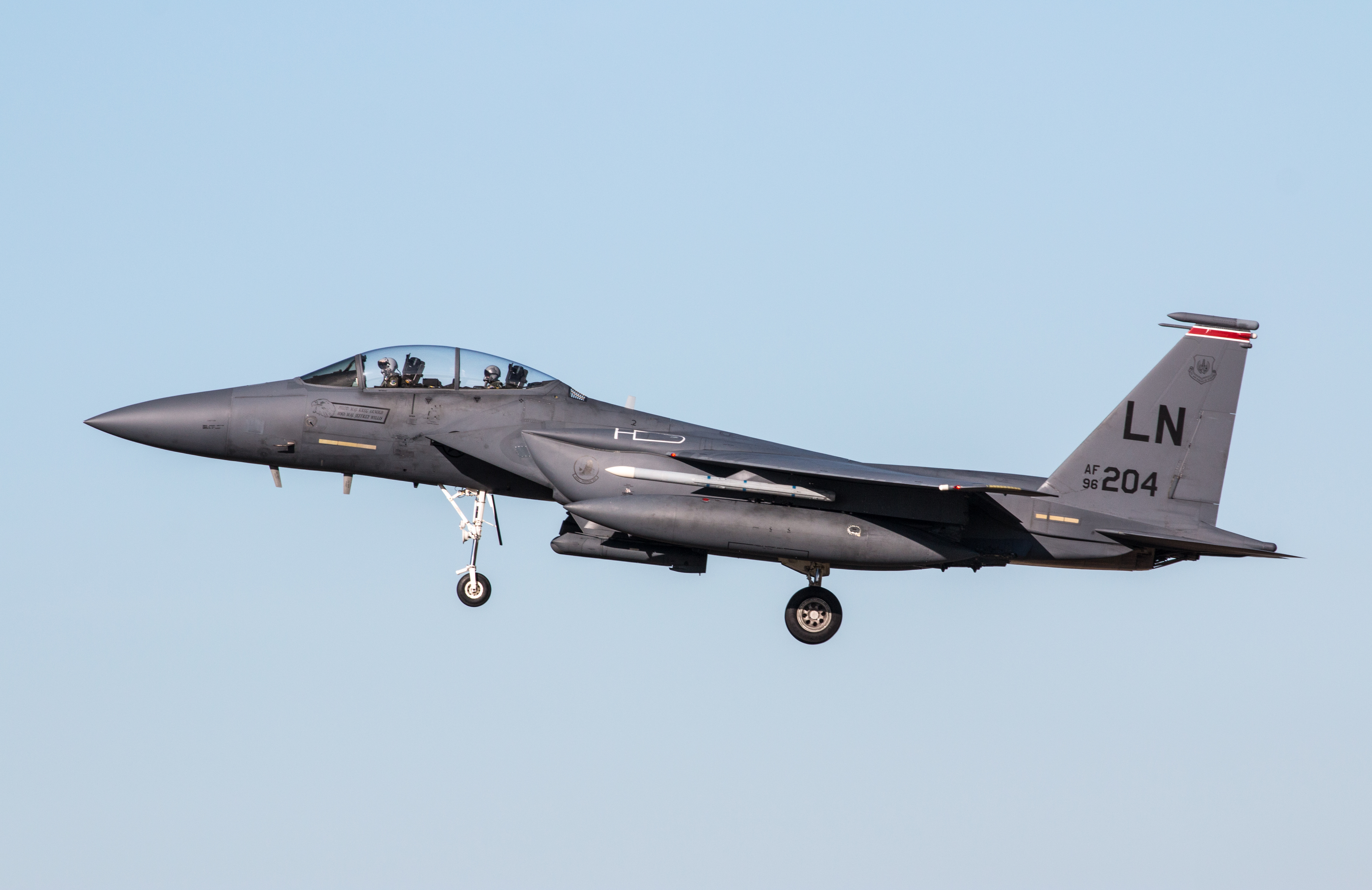
- A 494th FS F-15E Strike Eagle at RAF Lakenheath, 2015
- Active: 15 Jan 1941 – 7 Nov 1945; 10 July 1952 – present
- Country: United States
- Branch: United States Air Force
- Type: Fighter
- Part of: United States Air Forces in Europe
- Garrison/HQ: RAF Lakenheath
- Nickname: Panthers
- Equipment: F-15E Strike Eagle
- Engagements: European Theater of Operations; Operation Desert Shield; Operation Desert Storm; Operation Southern Watch; Operation Odyssey Dawn; Iraq War; Operation Enduring Freedom; Operation Inherent Resolve; April 2024 Iranian strikes against Israel; 2026 Iran war
- Decorations: Distinguished Unit Citation; Air Force Outstanding Unit Award; Navy Meritorious Unit Commendation; Belgian Fourragère

Insignia
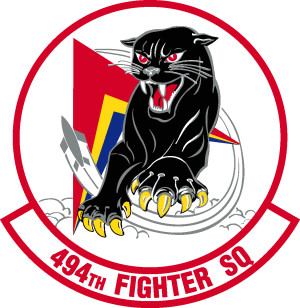
- 494th Fighter Squadron emblem (30 April 2007)

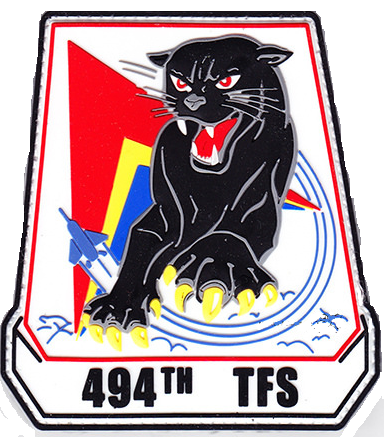
- 494th Tactical Fighter Squadron emblem (approved 6 December 1963)

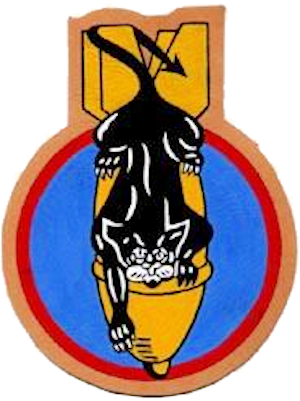
- 57th Bombardment Squadron emblem (Approved 22 August 1942)

The 494th Fighter Squadron (494th FS), nicknamed the Panthers, is part of the 48th Fighter Wing at RAF Lakenheath, United Kingdom, where they operate the McDonnell Douglas F-15E Strike Eagle.

== Mission ==
The 494th FS is a combat-ready McDonnell Douglas F-15E Strike Eagle squadron capable of executing strategic attack, interdiction, and counter air missions in support of United States Air Forces in Europe, United States European Command, and NATO operations. It employs the full array of air superiority and surface attack munitions to include the most advanced precision-guided weapons in the USAF inventory. The squadron is capable of deploying to any theater of operations in the world.

== History ==
=== World War II ===
Activated as a Southeastern Air District Army Air Corps training squadron, equipped with a variety of second-line aircraft, both single and twin engine, preparing its pilots and maintenance crews for eventual combat. After the Pearl Harbor Attack, the squadron flew antisubmarine patrols from, March–April 1942. Resumed aircrew training, many of the group's members went on to serve in squadrons stationed in Europe and the Pacific theaters.

Eventually coming under the AAF III Fighter Command in 1944, trained replacement pilots with P-47 Thunderbolts, Converted in January 1944 to an operational fighter squadron with the end of RTU training. Deployed to the European Theater of Operations (ETO), being assigned to the IX Fighter Command in England, March 1944.

Almost immediately after their arrival, the squadron began a rigorous training program, flying dive-bombing, glide bombing, night flying, low-level navigation, smoke laying, reconnaissance, and patrol convoy sorties. Over the next two months, the number of sorties steadily increased and the squadron flew its first combat mission on 20 April 1944—an uneventful fighter sweep of the occupied French coast.

Assisted the Normandy invasion by dropping bombs on bridges and gun positions, attacking rail lines and trains, and providing visual reconnaissance reports. Moved to France in mid-June 1944, supporting ground operations of Allied forces moving east across northern France throughout the war: primarily providing support for the United States First Army. Eventually was stationed in Occupied Germany on V-E Day.

On 5 July 1945, the squadron arrived in Laon, France. After a few weeks back in France the squadron received orders to return to the US. With many of the members separating at port, those remaining set up the headquarters at Seymour Johnson Field, North Carolina, and was programmed for deployment to Okinawa to take part in planned Invasion of Japan. Training discontinued after Atomic bombings of Hiroshima and Nagasaki and the sudden end of the Pacific War.

Two months later on 7 November 1945, the squadron inactivated as part of the massive postwar draw down.

=== Cold War ===
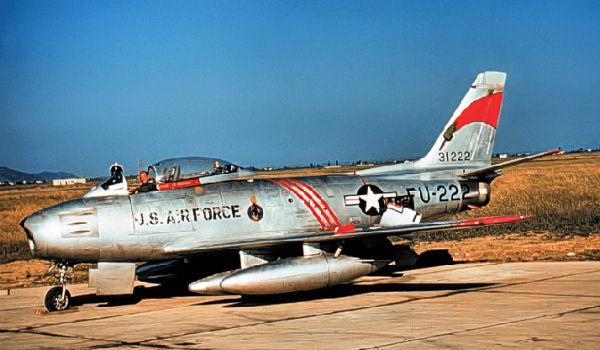
Squadron F-86F (Note: Aircraft is North American F-86F-35-NA, serial 53-1222 in 1955)

Reactivated in 1952 as a NATO Fighter-Bomber squadron assigned to France. Equipped initially with F-84G Thunderjets, upgraded in 1954 to F-86F Sabre aircraft. conducted operational readiness exercises and tactical evaluations. Honing bombing and gunnery skills. The squadron frequently deployed to Wheelus AB, Libya for training.

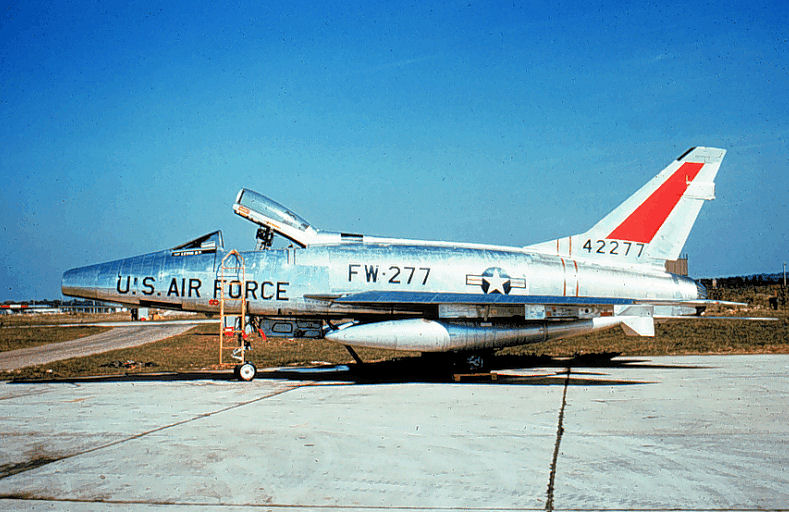
Squadron F-100D (Note: Aircraft is North American F-100D-15-NA Super Sabre, serial 54-2277.)

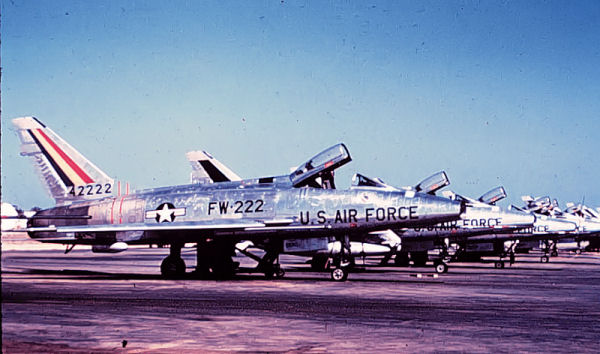
48th Tactical Fighter Wing F-100Ds at Chaumont Air Base in 1957 (Note: Aircraft in foreground, serial 54-2222, is the wing commander's aircraft. Note the blue, yellow and red stripes on the vertical stabilizer symbolizing the colors of the 492d (blue), 493d (yellow) and 494th (red) squadrons.)

Then in late 1956 the squadron upgraded to the F-100D Super Sabre. However the nuclear-weapon capable F-100 caused disagreements with France concerning atomic storage and custody issues within NATO, resulting in a decision to remove Air Force atomic-capable units from French soil. On 15 January 1960, the squadron and its host 48th TFW moved to RAF Lakenheath, UK.

Between 1960 and 1972 the squadron's F-100 fleet maintained its readiness by participating in a number of USAFE and NATO exercises training to react to possible aggression from the Soviet Union. They underwent a series of NATO tactical evaluations. The squadron conducted several deployments to Turkey, Italy, Spain, and across the United Kingdom.

Beginning in late 1971 the squadron started its conversion to the McDonnell Douglas F-4D Phantom II, with the aircraft being transferred from the 81st TFW at RAF Bentwaters. The conversion to the F-4D took several years, with the last F-100 departing in August 1974. With the arrival of the Phantoms, the F-4s adopted a common tail code of "LK". This tail code lasted only a few months as in July and August 1972 the 48th TFW further recoded to "LN".

The F-4's service with squadron was short as operation "Ready Switch" transferred the F-4D assets to the 474th TFW at Nellis AFB Nevada. The 474th sent their General Dynamics F-111As to the 347th TFW at Mountain Home AFB Idaho, and the 347th sent their F-111Fs to Lakenheath in early 1977. Unlike the previous F-4 transition, the F-111 change took place quickly and without any significant problems. Almost immediately after changing aircraft, the squadron began a series of monthly exercises and deployments that took the Liberty Wing to Italy, Iran, Greece, and Pakistan.

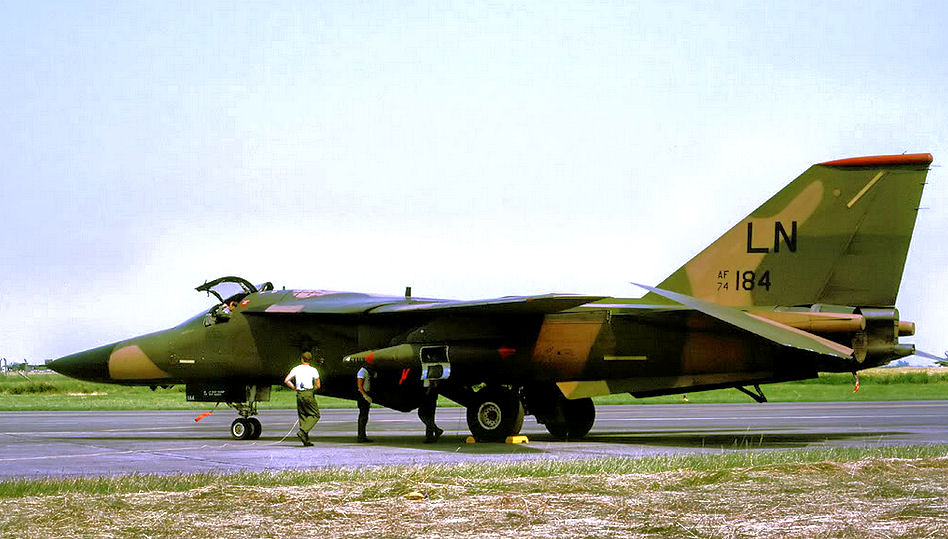
Squadron F-111F (Note: Aircraft is General Dynamics F-111F Aardvark, serial 74-184.)

The 494th also participated in Operation El Dorado Canyon, the air raid on Tripoli, Libya on 14 and 15 April 1986. It flew combat missions in Southwest Asia from, January–February 1991 as part of Operation Desert Storm.

=== Modern era ===
In the midst of the organizational changes, the squadron switched aircraft again, exchanging the F-111s for the F-15E Strike Eagle in early February 1992. The Strike Eagle represented a change from a strictly ground attack role to a dual role mission for the 494th: air interdiction and air superiority.

The squadron participated in Operation Odyssey Dawn in Libya in March 2011, along with numerous deployments to Southwest Asia supporting Air Expeditionary units as part of the ongoing Global War on Terrorism as part of Operation Iraqi Freedom (OIF) and Operation Enduring Freedom (OEF).

When squadron components are the primary force provider deploying to support Air Expeditionary operations the provisional unit is designated as the 494th Expeditionary Fighter Squadron.

In spring of 2019, the 494th Fighter Squadron was announced as the recipient of the 2018 Raytheon Trophy. The squadron received the 66-year-old trophy, a servicewide award sponsored by defense contractor Raytheon, for its overall performance and in recognition of its six-month deployment to the Middle East.

In mid-October 2023, the F-15E Strike Eagle aircraft of the 494th Fighter Squadron were deployed to the US Central Command to enhance air operations throughout the Middle East in response to the Gaza war.

On April 13-14, 2024, 494th F-15Es assisted in the defense of Israel against an onslaught of drones and surface-to-surface missiles launched from Iran. The 494th's F-15Es, operating with F-15Es from the 335th FS, were credited with over +70 kills of Iranian drones during combat air patrols.

Following the April 13-14 operation, the President of the United States called the commanding officers of both the 335th FS and 494th FS. The President commended the F-15E squadrons for their excellent airmanship and piloting skills in defense of Israel and US military personnel in the AOR.

On 3 April 2026, during the 2026 Iran war, Iranian forces downed a U.S. Air Force F-15E Strike Eagle from the 494th Fighter Squadron over western Iran. A large-scale CSAR mission rescued both crew members.

== Lineage ==
- Constituted as the 57th Bombardment Squadron (Light) on 20 November 1940

Activated on 15 January 1941
Redesignated 57th Bombardment Squadron (Dive) on 28 August 1942
Redesignated 494th Fighter Bomber Squadron on 10 August 1943
Redesignated 494th Fighter Squadron, Single Engine on 30 May 1944
Inactivated on 7 November 1945

- Redesignated 494th Fighter-Bomber Squadron on 25 June 1952

Activated on 10 July 1952
Redesignated 494th Tactical Fighter Squadron on 8 July 1958
Redesignated 494th Fighter Squadron on 30 November 1991

=== Assignments ===
- 48th Bombardment Group (later 48th Fighter-Bomber Group, 48 Fighter Group), 15 January 1941 – 7 November 1945
- 48th Fighter-Bomber Group, 10 July 1952
- 48th Fighter-Bomber Wing (later 48th Tactical Fighter Wing, 48th Fighter Wing), 8 December 1957

Attached to 48th Fighter Wing [Provisional], 2 September 1990 – 15 March 1991
Attached to 7440th Composite Wing, September–December 1991

- 48th Operations Group, 31 March 1992 – present

=== Stations ===
- Savannah Army Air Base, Georgia, 15 January 1941
- Will Rogers Field, Oklahoma, 23 May 1941
- Savannah Army Air Base, Georgia, 7 February 1942
- Key Field, Mississippi, 28 June 1942
- William Northern Field, Tennessee, 15 August 1943
- Walterboro Army Air Field, South Carolina, 27 January – 13 March 1944
- RAF Ibsley (Station 347), England, 29 March 1944
- Deux Jumeaux Airfield (A-4), France, 4 July 1944
- Vélizy-Villacoublay (A-42), France, 29 August 1944
- Cambrai/Niergnies Airfield (A-74), France (1944)
- Sint-Truiden Airfield (A-92), Belgium, 15 September 1944
- Kelz Airfield (Y-54), Germany, 26 March 1945
- Kassel-Rothwestern Airfield (R-12), Germany, c. 17 April 1945
- Illesheim Airfield (R-10), Germany, 29 April 1945
- Laon, France, 5 July–August 1945
- Seymour Johnson Field, North Carolina, 9 September – 7 November 1945
- Chaumont-Semoutiers Air Base, France, 10 July 1952
- RAF Lakenheath, England, 15 January 1960 – present

Deployed to: Ta’if, Saudi Arabia, 2 September 1990 – 15 March 1991
Deployed to: Incirlik Air Base, Turkey, September–December 1991
Deployed to: Aviano, Italy, 48 EFW alongside Triple Nickel 555th F-16 squadron, March–June 1999

=== Aircraft ===
From	To	Aircraft
1941	1941	A-18 Shrike
1941	1942	A-20 Havoc
1942	1942	A-31 Vengeance
1943	1943	A-35 Vengeance
1943	1943	P-40 Warhawk
1943	1944	P-39 Airacobra
1944	1945	P-47 Thunderbolt
1952	1954	F-84 Thunderjet
1953	1956	F-86 Sabre
1956	1972	F-100 Super Sabre
1974	1977	F-4 Phantom II
1977	1992	F-111F Aardvark
1992	Present	F-15E Strike Eagle

=== Operations ===
- World War II
- Operation El Dorado Canyon
- Operation Desert Storm
- Operation Allied Force
- Operation Enduring Freedom
- Operation Iraqi Freedom
- Operation Odyssey Dawn
- Operation Inherent Resolve
- 2026 Iran war
