= Royal N. Baker =

United States Air Force general

Royal Newman Baker
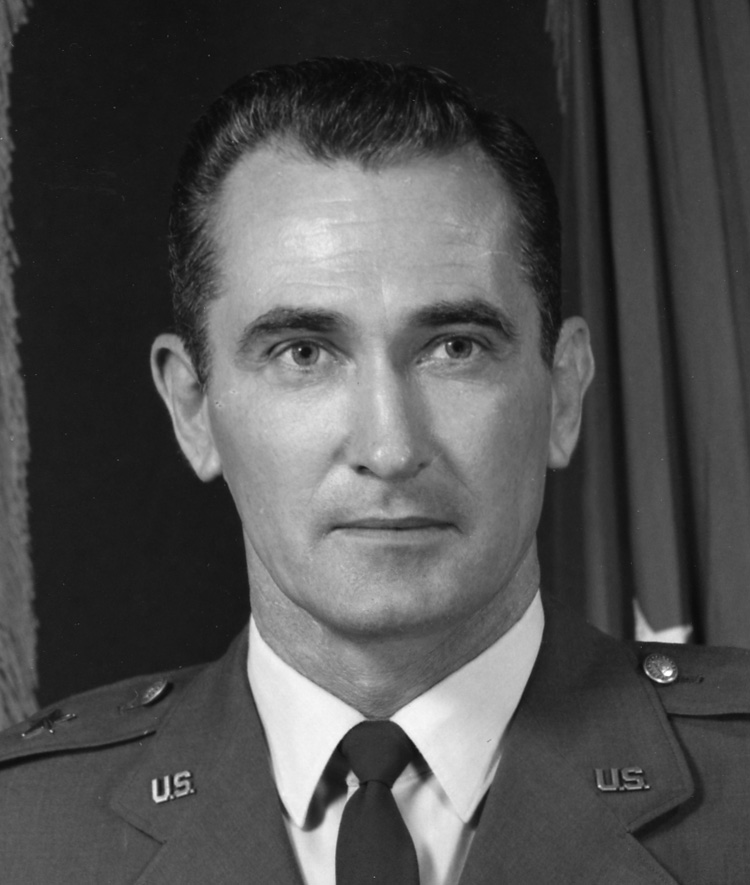
- Born: November 27, 1918; Corsicana, Texas, U.S.
- Died: April 17, 1976 (aged 57); Georgetown, Texas, U.S.
- Burial place: Pecan Grove Cemetery; McKinney, Texas
- Military career
- Allegiance: United States
- Branch: United States Air Force
- Service years: 1941–1975
- Rank: Lieutenant general
- Nickname: King
- Units: 31st Fighter Group; 48th Fighter Group; 4th Fighter-Interceptor Group; 7th Air Force
- Commands: Stewart Field; 2d Fighter Squadron; 4th Fighter-Interceptor Group; 20th Tactical Fighter Wing; 12th Air Force; 7th Air Force; 17th Air Force; NATO Allied Sector Three; Air Defense Command
- Conflicts: World War II; Korean War; Vietnam War
- Awards: Distinguished Service Cross; Air Force Distinguished Service Medal (3); Silver Star; Legion of Merit (4); Distinguished Flying Cross (4); Air Medal (43)

Lieutenant General Royal Newman "King" Baker (November 27, 1918 – April 17, 1976) was a United States Air Force (USAF) flying ace during the Korean War. He accrued 13 victories in the war.

Baker was one of the few military aviators who flew operationally in World War II, Korea, and Vietnam.

== Biography ==
Baker was born in Corsicana, Texas, in 1918, where he graduated from high school in 1936. He received his Bachelor of Science degree in industrial arts from North Texas State Teachers College in 1941. He began his military career as an aviation cadet at Hicks Field, Texas, in June 1941, and graduated from flight training in January 1942 with a commission as second lieutenant in the U.S. Army Air Forces (USAAF). He then attended USAAF Observer School at Brooks Field, Texas.

In March 1942 he joined the 308th Fighter Squadron of the 31st Fighter Group at New Orleans, Louisiana, and went with the group to Atcham Army Air Forces Station, England, in June 1942, the first American fighter group to reach England. The group was subsequently equipped with British Supermarine Spitfire aircraft and Aug. 19, 1942, participated in the historic Dieppe Raid. Three months later, the group moved to North Africa, where General Baker piloted the British fighter in air operations over Algeria, Tunisia, and Sicily. For his aerial combat achievements, Baker was awarded the Distinguished Flying Cross and the Air Medal with 16 oak leaf clusters.

In November 1943 Baker was assigned as flight commander with the 493rd Fighter Squadron, 48th Fighter Group, at Tullahoma, Tenn. Early in 1944, he went to the European Theater of Operations with the group which was assigned to the Ninth Air Force. He flew P-47 Thunderbolt aircraft in the campaigns of Air Offensive, Europe; Normandy; and Rhineland. He was awarded the Silver Star for gallantry in action and also received an oak leaf cluster to the Distinguished Flying Cross. By the end of his second European tour of duty, he had flown a total of 523 hours on 272 combat missions in British Spitfire and Thunderbolt fighter aircraft.

Baker returned to the United States in December 1944 and served for a year as assistant director and director of fighter pilot training units. He was relieved from active duty in November 1945.

In July 1947 Baker reentered active duty and was named commander of the 115th Army Air Forces Base Unit at Stewart Field, N.Y. In December 1947 he was transferred to Mitchel Air Force Base, N.Y., as commander of the 2nd Fighter Squadron, 52d Fighter Group, and became group operations officer. He next attended the Air Command and Staff School, Maxwell Air Force Base, Alabama. In October 1950 he was transferred to McGuire Air Force Base, N.J., as director of operations and training for the 52nd All-Weather Wing and later was commander of the 52nd Fighter Interceptor Group. When the 52nd Wing was reorganized, he was appointed director of operations of the 4709th Air Defense Wing.

He went to Korea in April 1952 and assumed command of the 4th Fighter Interceptor Group, Far East Air Forces. During the Korean War, he flew 127 missions and accumulated 199 combat hours in F-86 Sabre jet aircraft and was awarded the Distinguished Service Cross and Legion of Merit. He was the leading jet ace when he returned home and is the 21st jet ace of the Korean War, with 13 enemy aircraft destroyed.

In March 1953 Baker was assigned to Air Defense Command with duty station at Edwards Air Force Base, California, where he served as liaison project officer, Directorate of Plans and Requirements; in July 1955 became ADC project officer for the Directorate of Operations and Training; and in May 1957 became director of testing for the Air Force Flight Test Center of the Air Research and Development Command. He graduated from the National War College in June 1961.

He next assumed command of the 20th Tactical Fighter Wing at Royal Air Force Station Wethersfield, England. In June 1963 he was appointed deputy commander of Third Air Force with headquarters at South Ruislip, England. In July 1964 General Baker returned to Washington, D.C., and assumed duties as chief of Regional Division 1, Plans and Policy Directorate of the Organization of the Joint Chiefs of Staff. He was assigned in August 1966 as vice commander of Twelfth Air Force with headquarters at Waco, Texas.

In March 1968 Baker went to South Vietnam as assistant chief of staff for plans, Military Assistance Command Vietnam, and in July 1968 assumed duties as vice commander, Seventh Air Force. He flew 140 combat sorties and piloted every kind of USAF combat aircraft based in Vietnam. In July 1969 he was appointed commander, Seventeenth Air Force, Ramstein Air Base, West Germany, with dual responsibility to command NATO's Allied Sector Three. In February 1971 he was assigned as chief, Military Assistance Advisory Group, with headquarters at Bonn, Germany.

In January 1973 Baker became vice commander, Aerospace Defense Command, at Ent Air Force Base, Colo. Because of the consolidation of Continental Air Defense Command and Aerospace Defense Command headquarters he was appointed assistant vice commander on July 1, 1973, and in January 1974 was renamed vice commander until his retirement from the USAF on August 1, 1975.

Baker died on April 17, 1976, and was buried at the Pecan Grove Cemetery in McKinney, Texas.

== Awards and decorations ==
Royal Baker's ribbons as they appeared at retirement:

Command Pilot Badge
Distinguished Service Cross	Air Force Distinguished Service Medal with two bronze oak leaf clusters	Silver Star
Legion of Merit with three bronze oak leaf clusters	Distinguished Flying Cross with three bronze oak leaf clusters	Air Medal with four silver oak leaf clusters
Air Medal with four silver oak leaf clusters (second ribbon required for accouterment spacing)	Air Medal (third ribbon required for accouterment spacing)	Joint Service Commendation Medal
Air Force Commendation Medal	Air Force Outstanding Unit Award	American Defense Service Medal
American Campaign Medal	European-African-Middle Eastern Campaign Medal with one silver and two bronze campaign stars	World War II Victory Medal
National Defense Service Medal with one bronze service star	Korean Service Medal with two bronze campaign stars	Vietnam Service Medal with silver and bronze campaign stars
Air Force Longevity Service Award with one silver and two bronze oak leaf clusters	Small Arms Expert Marksmanship Ribbon	French Croix de Guerre with Palm
South Korean Order of National Security Merit (Third Class)	South Korean Order of National Security Merit (First Class)	National Order of Vietnam (Commander)
Vietnam Air Force Distinguished Service Order (2nd Class)	Republic of Korea Presidential Unit Citation	Republic of Vietnam Gallantry Cross
United Nations Service Medal for Korea	Vietnam Campaign Medal	Korean War Service Medal

== See also ==
- List of Korean War flying aces
