= Deux-Jumeaux =

- Commune
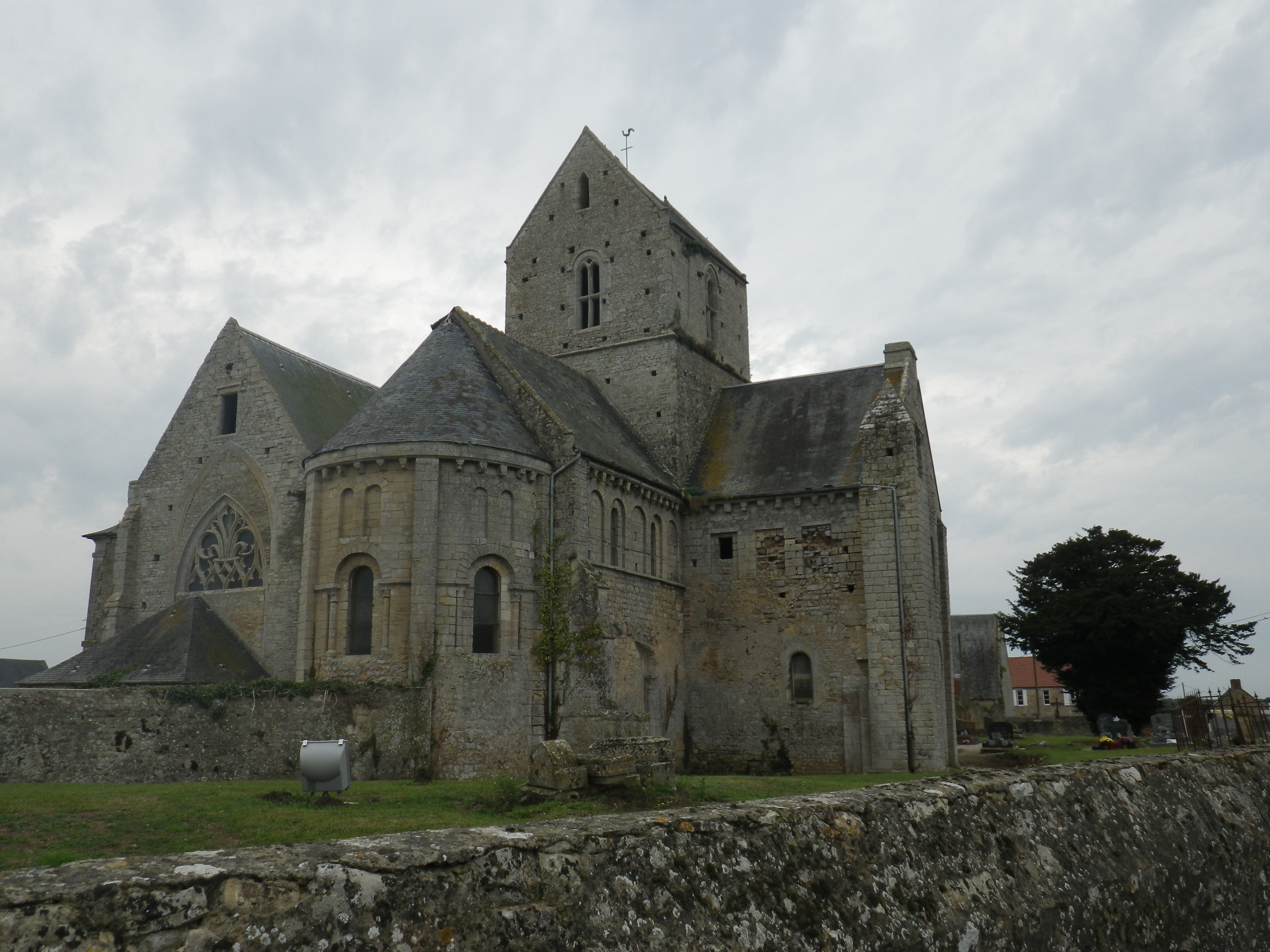
- The abbey of Deux-Jumeaux
- Location of Deux-Jumeaux
- Location within France Location within Normandy
- Coordinates: 49°20′55″N 0°57′45″W
- Country: France
- Region: Normandy
- Department: Calvados
- Arrondissement: Bayeux
- Canton: Trévières
- Intercommunality: CC Isigny-Omaha Intercom

Government
  - Mayor (2020–2026): Marine Voisin
- Area^{1}: 4.07 km^{2} (1.57 sq mi)
- Elevation: 48 m (157 ft)
- Highest elevation: 47 m (154 ft)
- Lowest elevation: 8 m (26 ft)
- Population (2023): 61
  - Density: 15/km^{2} (39/sq mi)
- Time zone: UTC+01:00 (CET)
  - Summer (DST): UTC+02:00 (CEST)
- INSEE/Postal code: 14224 /14230
- ^{1} French Land Register data, which excludes lakes, ponds, glaciers > 1 km^{2} (0.386 sq mi or 247 acres) and river estuaries.

Deux-Jumeaux (French pronunciation: [dø ʒymo]) is a commune in the Calvados department in the Normandy region in northwestern France.

== History ==
=== World War II ===
After the liberation of the area by Allied Forces in early June 1944, engineers of the Ninth Air Force IX Engineering Command began construction of a combat Advanced Landing Ground to the northeast of the town. Declared operational on 30 June, the airfield was designated as "A-4", it was used by the 48th Fighter Group which flew P-47 Thunderbolts until the end of August when the unit moved into Central France. Afterward, the airfield was closed.

== Population ==
Historical population
Year	Pop.	±% p.a.
1968	138	—
1975	102	−4.23%
1982	101	−0.14%
1990	78	−3.18%
1999	69	−1.35%
2007	77	+1.38%
2012	65	−3.33%
2017	55	−3.29%
2023	61	+1.74%
Source: INSEE

== See also ==
- Communes of the Calvados department
