= 493rd Fighter Squadron =

493rd Fighter Squadron

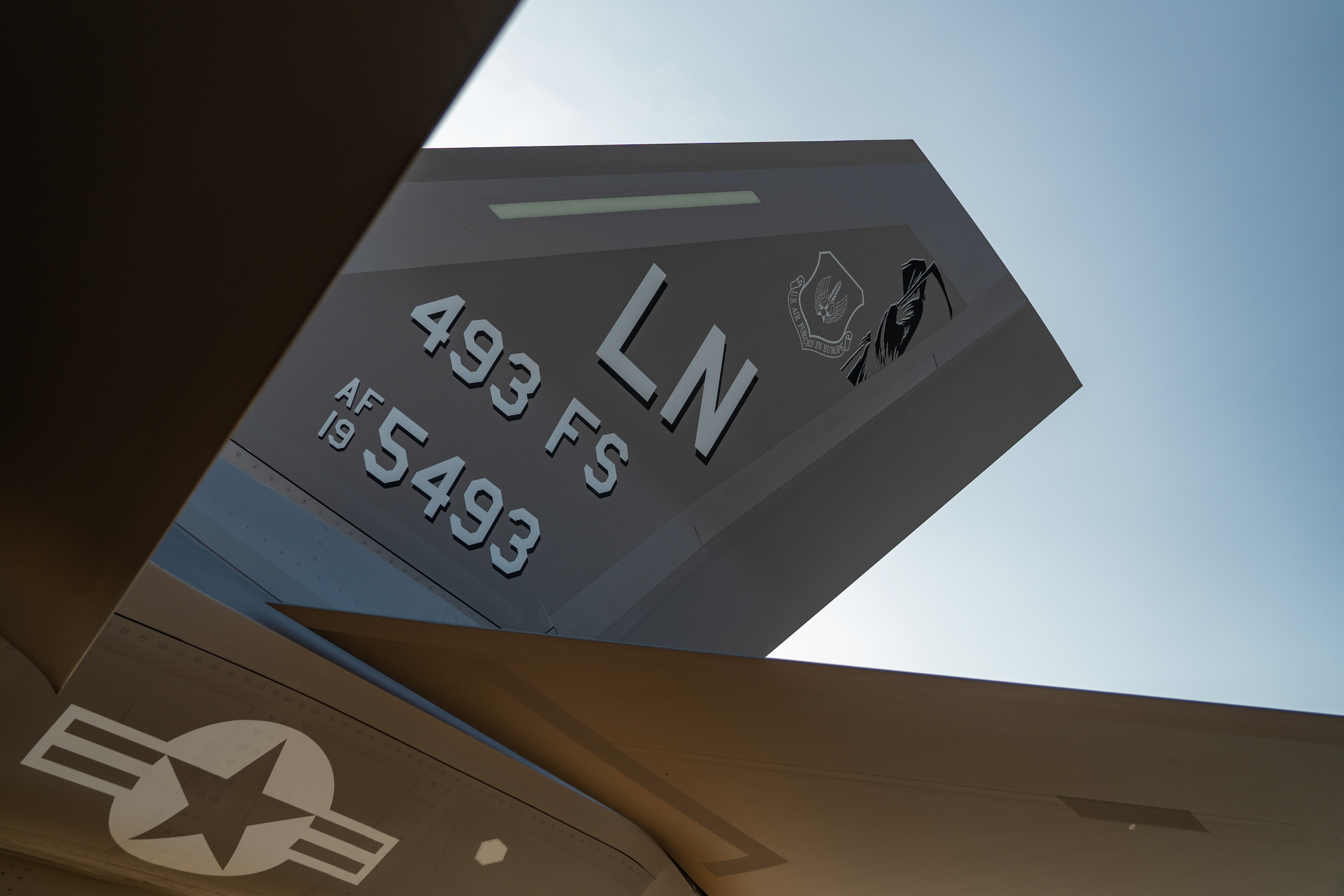
- The 493rd's markings on the tail of the first F-35A to be delivered to the squadron in 2022
- Active: 1941–1945; 1952–1992; 1994–present
- Country: United States
- Branch: United States Air Force
- Role: Fighter
- Part of: United States Air Forces in Europe – Air Forces Africa
- Garrison/HQ: RAF Lakenheath, United Kingdom
- Nicknames: The Grim Reapers; The Roosters (1956–1992)
- Motto: Mors Inimicis (Latin for 'Death to the Enemy')
- Colors: Black/Gold
- Engagements: European Theater of Operations; Operation El Dorado Canyon; Gulf War; Operation Southern Watch; War in Kosovo; Global War on Terror; *Operation Enduring Freedom; *Iraq War; Operation Odyssey Dawn; Baltic Air Policing
- Decorations: Distinguished Unit Citation; Navy Meritorious Unit Commendation; Air Force Outstanding Unit Award; Belgian Fourragere

Insignia
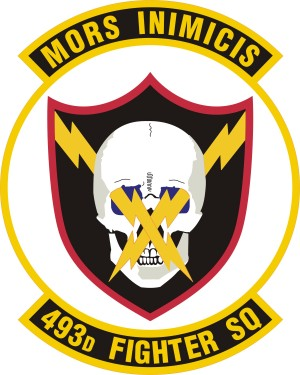
- 493d Fighter Squadron emblem (Note: Approved 20 August 2003.)

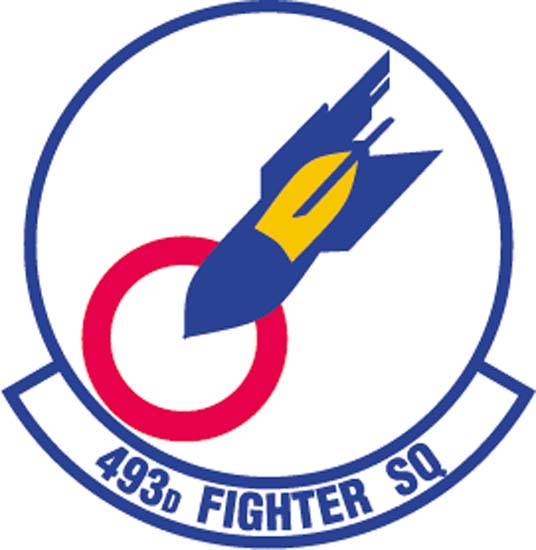
- 493d Tactical Fighter Squadron emblem

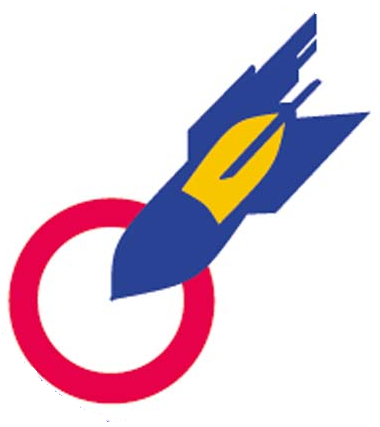
- 56th Bombardment Squadron emblem (Note: Approved 24 December 1941. Description: A yellow aerial bomb with nose[,] fins and winged vane in blue, slanting downward with nose centered within a red circdle.)
- Tail code: LN (Note: Wing coded July 1972–present, earlier LS (Mar 1970–Dec 1971), LK (Dec 1971–July 1972).)
- World War II fuselage code: I7

The 493rd Fighter Squadron, nicknamed The Grim Reapers, is part of the 48th Fighter Wing, located at RAF Lakenheath, Suffolk, England. The squadron operates the Lockheed Martin F-35A Lightning II.

The squadron was originally activated as the 56th Bombardment Squadron in 1941, as the United States Army Air Corps built up prior to the entry of the United States into World War II. Following the attack on Pearl Harbor, it briefly engaged in the antisubmarine campaign before becoming a Replacement Training Unit. In 1943, it became the 493rd Fighter-Bomber Squadron and trained for overseas deployment. The squadron moved to England and engaged in combat until V-E day, earning a Distinguished Unit Citation and the Belgian Fourragere for its actions. It returned to the United States, where it was inactivated in November 1945.

The squadron was reactivated in France in July 1952, when it assumed the personnel and equipment of an Air National Guard squadron that had been mobilized for the Korean War. It moved to England in 1960, and has participated in Operation El Dorado Canyon and Desert Storm. It has deployed aircraft and personnel to support operations in Southwest Asia and Afghanistan, including deployments in which it made up all, or nearly all, of the 493rd Expeditionary Fighter Squadron.

The squadron has earned multiple commendations and awards, including the Air Force Association's Hughes Trophy in 1997 and 1999 and the 2007, 2014, 2016 and 2019 Raytheon Trophies, for being recognized as the top fighter squadron in the United States Air Force.

== History ==
=== World War II ===
==== Organization and training in the United States ====
A-20 Havoc, first plane to equip the squadron

The unit was first activated Hunter Field, Georgia in January 1941 as the 56th Bombardment Squadron, one of the four original squadrons assigned to the 48th Bombardment Group and equipped with Douglas A-20 Havoc bombers. The squadron trained for operation as a light bomber unit. Following the attack on Pearl Harbor, the squadron briefly flew antisubmarine patrols, from March to April 1942.

In June 1942, the squadron moved to Key Field, Mississippi, where it replaced its Havocs with Vultee A-35 Vengeances and became a Replacement Training Unit (RTU). RTUs were oversized units which trained aircrews prior to their deployment to combat theaters. In August 1943, along with other Army Air Forces single-engine light and dive bomber units, the squadron became a fighter-bomber unit as the 493rd Fighter-Bomber Squadron.

Five days after this redesignation, the squadron ended its RTU mission at Key Field and moved to William Northern Field, Tennessee, and re-equipped with Bell P-39 Airacobras and Curtiss P-40 Warhawks. It began to prepare for combat, moving to Walterboro Army Air Field, South Carolina in January 1944, where it received Republic P-47 Thunderbolts, the type it would fly in combat. It departed for Camp Shanks, the Port of Embarkation, on 13 March 1944 for transport to the European Theater of Operations on board the RMS Queen Mary.

==== Combat in the European Theater ====
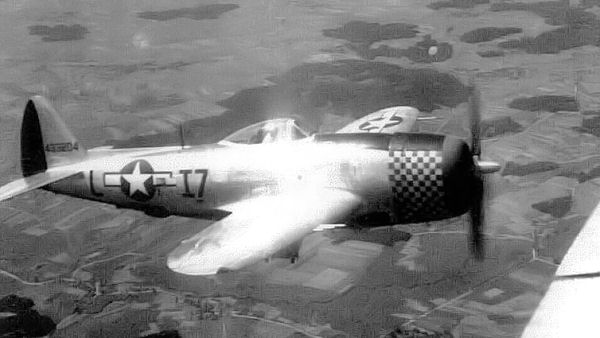
Squadron P-47D Thunderbolt (Note: Aircraft is P-47D-30-RA Thunderbolt, serial 44-33204.)

The squadron arrived at its first combat base, RAF Ibsley, England on 29 March 1944. It flew its first combat mission on 20 April 1944, a fighter sweep of the occupied French coast. On 30 May 1944, the unit became the 493rd Fighter Squadron.

The 493rd took part in Operation Overlord, the invasion of Normandy On D-Day, it bombed bridges and gun positions. As the Normandy campaign advanced, it attacked rail lines and trains, motor transport, bridges, fuel dumps and gun positions and performed visual reconnaissance. On 18 June 1944, the 493rd moved to France to Deux Jumeaux Airfield, an advanced landing ground. From there, the squadron supported Operation Cobra, the breakout at Saint Lo, in July.

The squadron supported Allied forces in their drive across northern France, primarily the United States First Army. In August and September, it flew missions for Operation Market Garden airborne attacks on Rhine river crossings in the Netherlands. It was cited by the Belgian Army for its close cooperation with allied forces from 6 June to 30 September. After it moved to Sint-Truiden Airfield, Belgium in September, it was cited a second time for its operations in the fall and winter of 1944-1945, resulting in the award of the Belgian Fourragere to the squadron. It was cited by the Belgian Army a third time for its participation in the Battle of the Bulge.

On 6 December 1944, the squadron faced heavy enemy fire while flying beneath a heavy overcast to attack buildings, entrenchments and troop concentrations to assist the advance of ground troops against an enemy stronghold north of Julich, Germany. For this action it was awarded a Distinguished Unit Citation. The squadron supported ground troops during the Battle of the Bulge, continuing support through the end of the war in Europe. Its missions included bomber escort missions, weather reconnaissance, and leaflet flights. On one occasion, it carried blood plasma in belly tanks, dropping the tanks to ground troops.

In March 1945, the squadron supported the 9th Armored Division in defending the bridgehead the division had established after crossing the only intact bridge across the Rhine at Remagen. The squadron flew its last mission of the war from on 8 May 1945 from Illesheim Airfield, Germany.

In August 1945, the unit returned to the United States, with many members seprating at the Port of Embarkation. The remaining squadron members reassembled at Seymour Johnson Field, North Carolina, where the squadron was inactivated on 7 November 1945.

=== Cold War ===
==== Reactivation in France ====
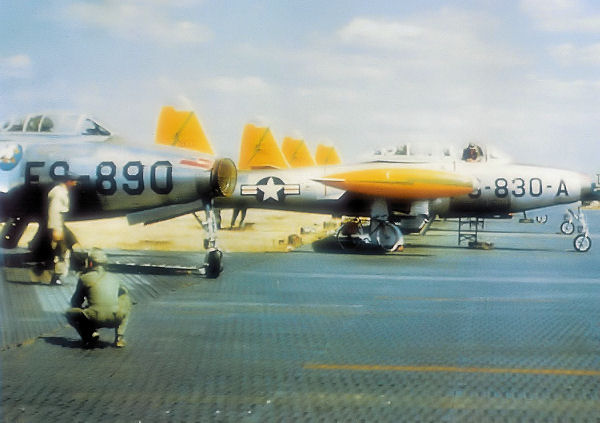
F-84G Thunderjets of the 493d and 494th Fighter-Bomber Squadrons (Note: Both aircraft are Republic F-84G-1-RE Thunderjets. Serial 51-890 is from the 494th Fighter-Bomber Squadron and 51-830 is from the 493d. Note the pierced steel planking used for the parking apron as concrete pads have not yet been poured. Both aircraft were eventually sold to the Belgian Air Force 890 was destroyed on 25 May 1955 at Sylt, West Germany.)

The unit was again designated the 493rd Fighter-Bomber Squadron and activated at Chaumont Air Base, France, on 10 July 1952, when it took over the mission, personnel and Republic F-84G Thunderjets of the 127th Fighter-Bomber Squadron, an Air National Guard squadron that had been called to active duty for the Korean War, and was being returned to the control of the State of Kansas. The squadron rotated pilots on temporary duty to Far East Air Forces (FEAF), where they gained combat experience with FEAF's F-84 units. In November 1953, the squadron began to switch to North American F-86F Sabres, as the 48th Wing became the first United States Air Forces Europe (USAFE) Sabre wing. It began to transfer its F-84s to the 36th Fighter-Bomber Wing at Bitburg Air Base, Germany, with some going to the Danish Air Force under the Mutual Defense Assistance Program (MDAP). The 48th Wing was also tasked to train pilots of European nations receiving F-84s under MDAP. The last of the Thunderjets left in 1954.

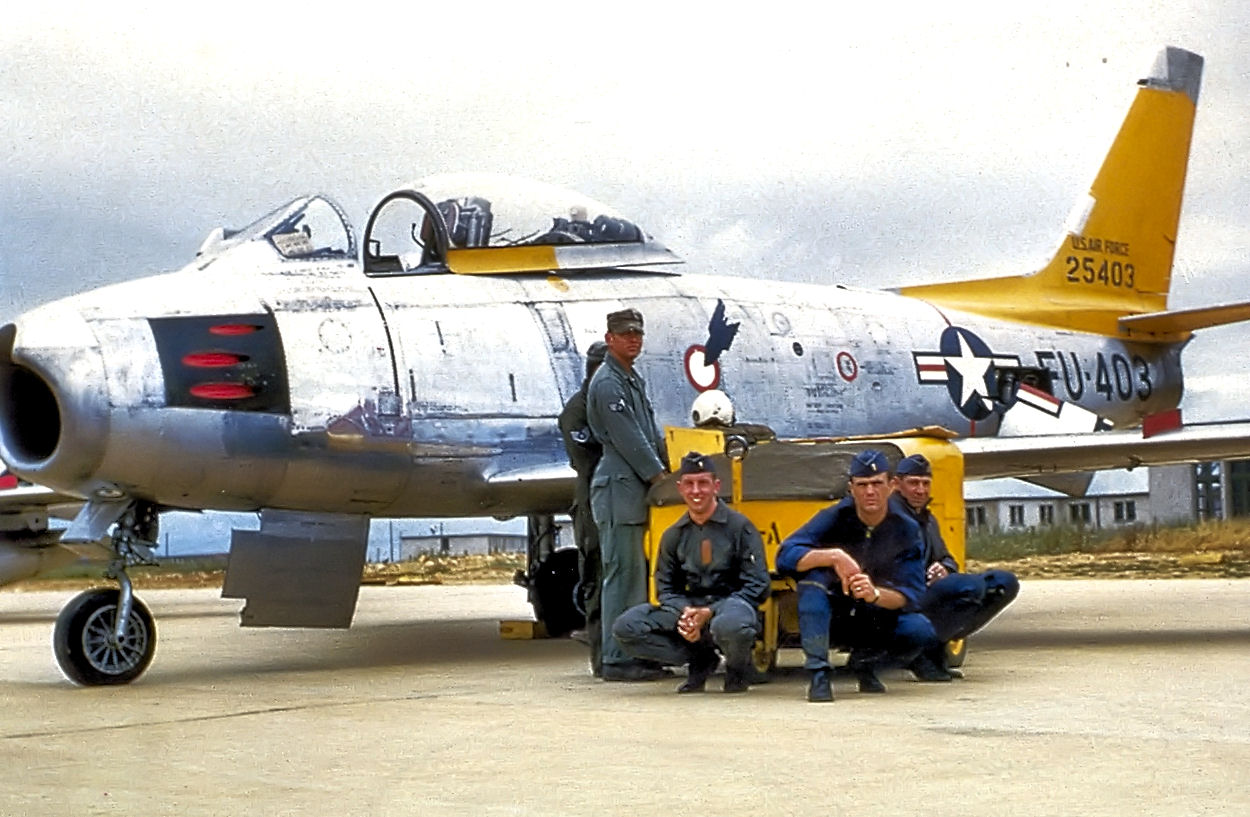
Squadron F-86F Sabre in 1956 (Note: Aircraft is North American F-86F-25-NH Sabre, serial 52-5403.)

In 1955, the squadron began training for delivery of the Mark 7 nuclear bomb at Wheelus Air Base, Lybia during their gunnery and weapons delivery deployments there. In September, the squadron began deployments to Furstenfeldbruck Air Base, Germany, where it stood Zulu (nuclear) Alert. In February 1956, the Zulu Alert location changed to Sembach Air Base, Germany, as Furstenfeldbruck was transferred to the German Air Force and the squadron's alert aircraft began using the lighter Mark 12 nuclear bomb for some of its alert aircraft.

Starting in September 1956, the squadron began upgrading to the North American F-100D Super Sabre, as the 48th Wing became the first wing in USAFE to fly the Super Sabre. Because of the more favorable winter weather there, upgrade training was conducted at bases in Morococo. Because the F-100s could not operate from Sembach, the squadron's Zulu Alert base changed to Hahn Air Base, with F-100s replacing the alert F-86s in January 1957. In December 1957, the 48th Wing converted to the dual deputy organization. (Note: Under this plan flying squadrons reported to the wing Deputy Commander for Operations.) The 48th Group was inactivated and the squadron was assigned directy to the 48th Fighter Bomber Wing. The squadron was redesignated the 493rd Tactical Fighter Squadron on 8 July 1958. During 1958, the squadron's Zulu Alert planes began to be armed with Mark 28 nuclear bombs, which could be carried on a centerline pylon permitting the planes to carry additional fuel to extend their range.

However, due to French concerns about atomic storage and custody issues, a decision was made resulting in the removal of USAF atomic-capable units from French soil in Project Red Richard. On 15 January 1960, the 48th Wing moved to RAF Lakenheath, England.

==== Move to England ====
The squadron's F-100 fleet trained with USAFE and NATO to react to aggression from the Soviet Union. It conducted deployments to Turkey, Italy, Spain, and across the United Kingdom. It continued training deployments to Wheelus until 1969, when Muammar Gaddafi, who had recently taken power, asked the United States to leave the country.

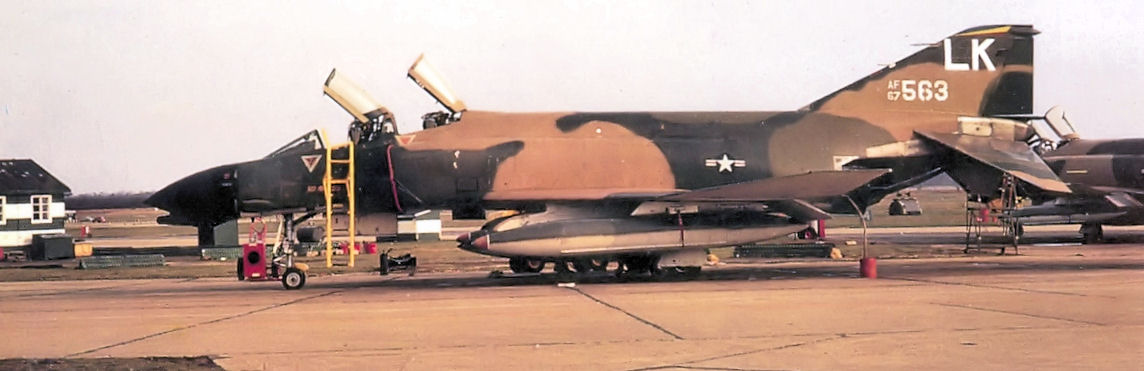
493rd TFS McDonnell Douglas F-4D-30-MC Phantom II 66-7563, 1976

On 1 December 1971, the squadron stood down from its NATO obligations to convert to the McDonnell Douglas F-4D Phantom II. The conversion to the F-4D was slow and it was not until July 1974 that the unit reached its full complement of Phantoms, and the squadron did not become operational with the new fighter until January 1975. It continued deploy to stand nuclear alert with the Phantom.

=== F-111s and Operation El Dorado Canyon ===
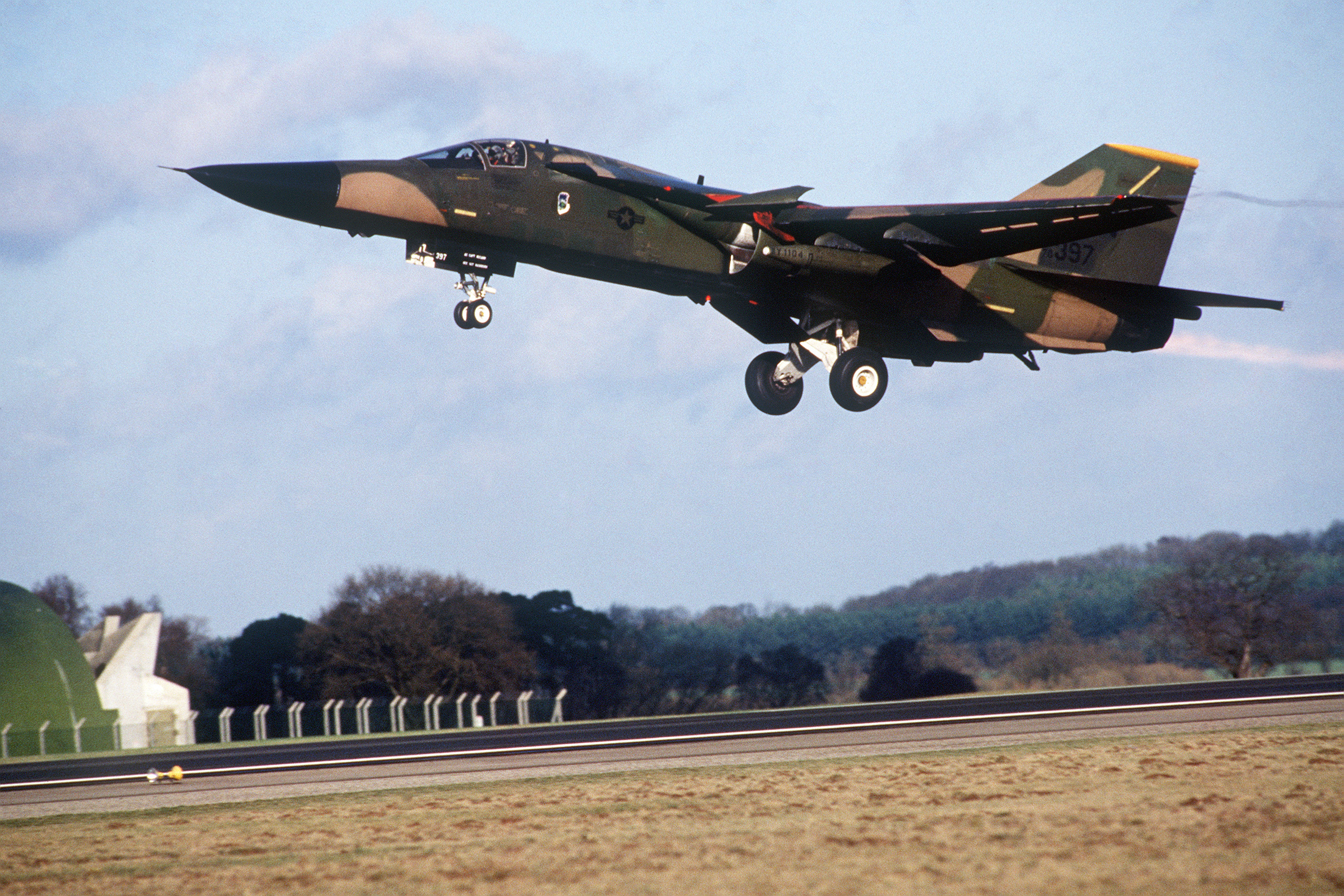
Squadron F-111F Aardvark departing Hahn Air Base, Germany in 1986 (Note: Aircraft is General Dynamics F-111F Aardvark 70-2397 of the 493rd TFS.)

The Phantom's service with squadron was short. The squadron received General Dynamics F-111F Aardvarks from the 366th Tactical Fighter Wing at Mountain Home Air Force Base as the 366th Wing converted to F-111As in early 1977. Unlike the switch to F-4s, the F-111 change took place quickly and with no significant problems, earning the wing an Air Force Outstanding Unit Award. Almost immediately after changing aircraft, the squadron began a series of monthly exercises and deployments that took the squadron to Italy, Iran, Greece, and Pakistan.

On night of 14/15 April 1986, the 493rd and the rest of the 48th Wing participated with Navy air units in Operation El Dorado Canyon, the air raid on Tripoli, Libya, as a response to the West Berlin discotheque bombing. The squadron received a Navy Meritorious Unit Commendation for its performance in this operation.

The 493rd deployed their F-111Fs to Taif Air Base, Saudi Arabia, as part of Operation Desert Shield, in response to Saddam Hussein's invasion of Kuwait. At Taif, the fighters became part of the Tactical Fighter Wing, Provisional, 48th. The unit launched strikes on Iraq as part of Operation Desert Storm between in January and February 1991. The provisional wing was credited with the destruction of 920 armored vehiclas well as aircraft shelters, bunkers and bridges, while suffering no losses. In one of the last missions of the war, on 27 February, the unit recorded the first combat use of a laser guided GBU-28, destroying an Iraqi command and control center. After returning to Lakenheath, the 48th reorganized under the Objective Wing model, and the squadron was renamed the 493rd Fighter Squadron and again assigned to the 48th Group, now named the 48th Operations Group. The squadron wound up its F-111 operations in 1992, and was inactivated on 18 December.

=== F-15 Eagle operations ===
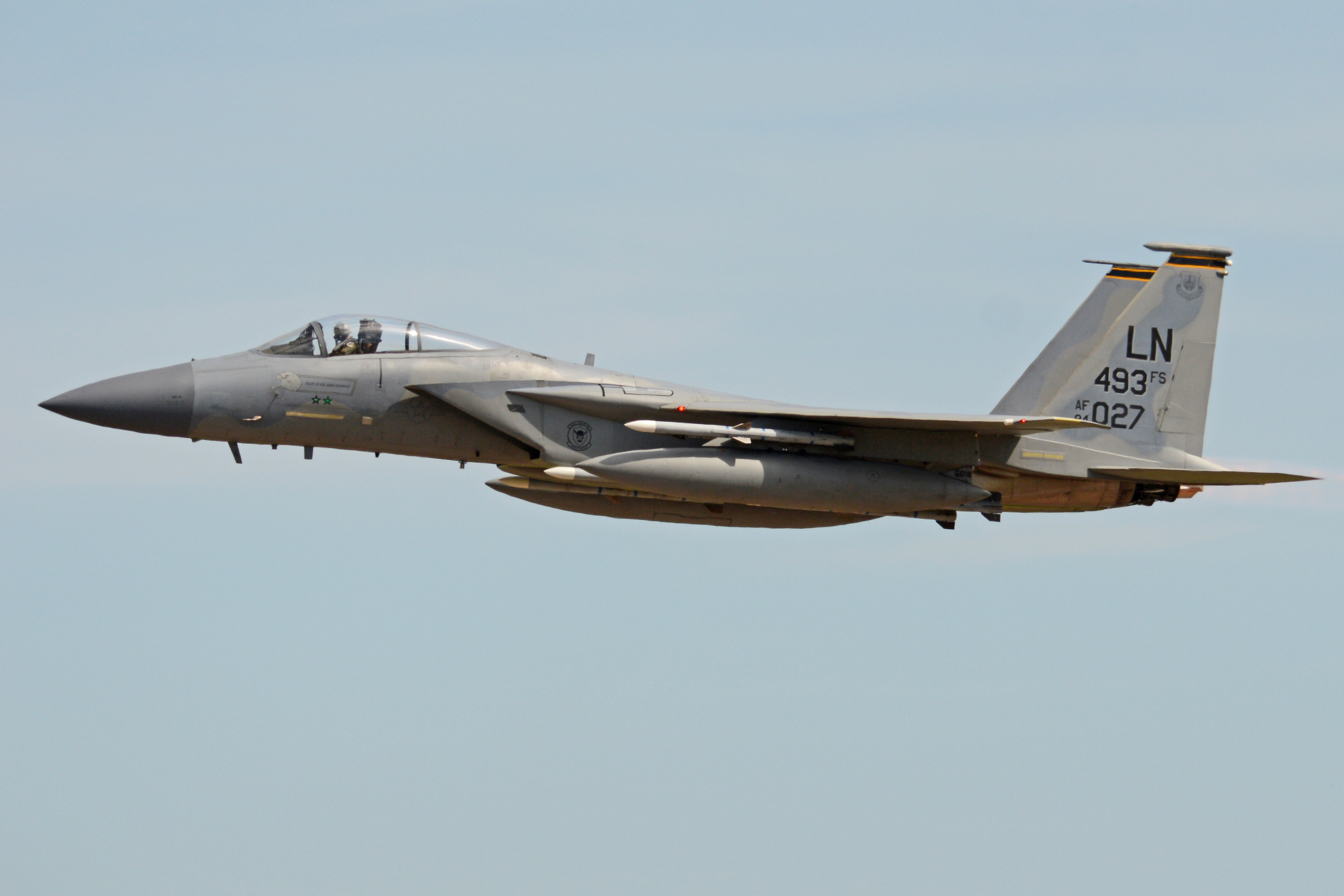
Squadron F-15C Eagle in 2017 (Note: Aircraft is McDonnell Douglas F-15C-38-MC Eagle, serial 84-0027. The two green stars on the nose relate to a Mirage F1 and a MiG-23 which this Eagle shot down during Desert Storm while operated by the 53rd Tactical Fighter Squadron.)

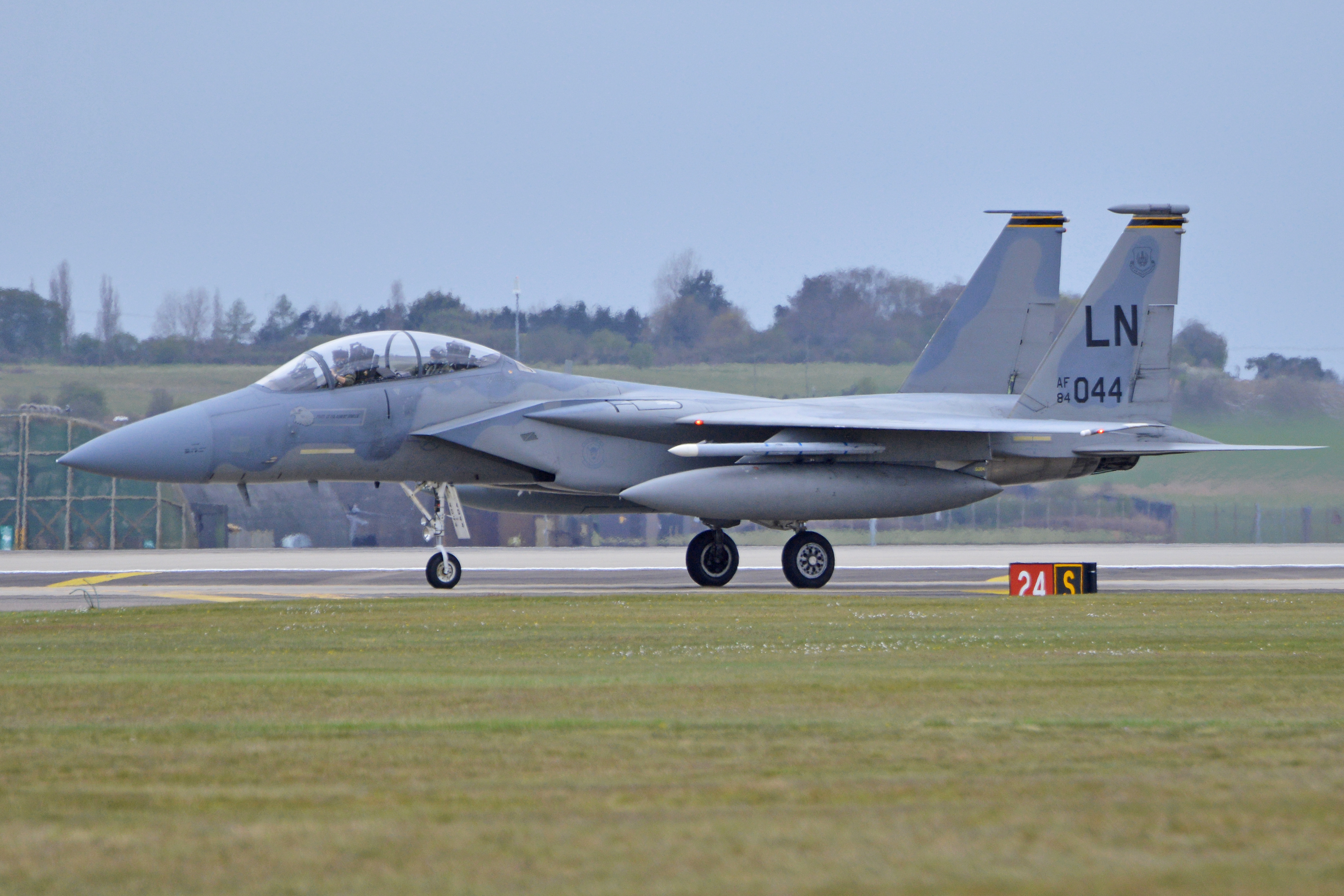
F-15D Eagle taxiing at RAF Lakenheath in 2014 (Note: Aircraft is McDonnell Doublas F-15D-37-MC Eagle, serial 84-0044.)

The 493rd was reactivated on 1 January 1994. and began to receive McDonnell Douglas F-15C Eagles and F-15Ds from Bitburg Air Base. The Grim Reapers received the rest of their 18 Eagles from Langley and Eglin Air Force Base, with the last one arriving on 22 July 1994.

In 1998, the 493rd FS received another six F-15Cs, increasing the squadron size to 24 aircraft. These came from the 53rd Fighter Squadron based at Spangdahlem Air Base, Germany, due to it being inactivated because of the USAF consolidating its squadrons.

On 24 March 1999, F-15C pilots, Lieutenant Colonel Cesar Rodriguez and Captain Mike Showers, each shot down a MiG-29 during Operation Allied Force over Kosovo. On 26 March, Captain Jeff Hwang shot down two MiG-29s.

On 3 August 2000, F-15C 86-0173 was written off after crashing 10 mi (16 km) northeast of Rachel, Nevada, during a Green Flag exercise. The pilot safely ejected and was not injured. The aircraft had departed controlled flight and entered a flat spin while executing basic fighter maneuverss. The investigation attributed the crash to pilot error.

On 26 March 2001, two F-15Cs from the 493rd FS (86-0169 and 86-0180) crashed into Ben Macdui in the Cairngorms mountain range, both pilots died in the crash.

Between 23 March and 10 April 2008, the 493rd participated in the Romanian-led Operation Noble Endeavor. It was deployed to the Graf Ignatievo Air Base in Bulgaria and provided air policing missions for the 2008 Bucharest summit together with the 493rd Fighter Squadron which was stationed at Câmpia Turzii in Romania. After the summit, the squadron remained for a few weeks more to train alongside Bulgarian MiG-29 fighters.

In June 2008, the Grim Reapers were selected as the 2007 Raytheon Trophy winners, the first time in 10 years they had been recognised as the best fighter squadron in the USAF.

The squadron participated in Operation Odyssey Dawn in Libya in March 2011, along with numerous deployments to Southwest Asia supporting air expeditionary units as part of the ongoing global war on terrorism and as part of Operation Iraqi Freedom and Operation Enduring Freedom.

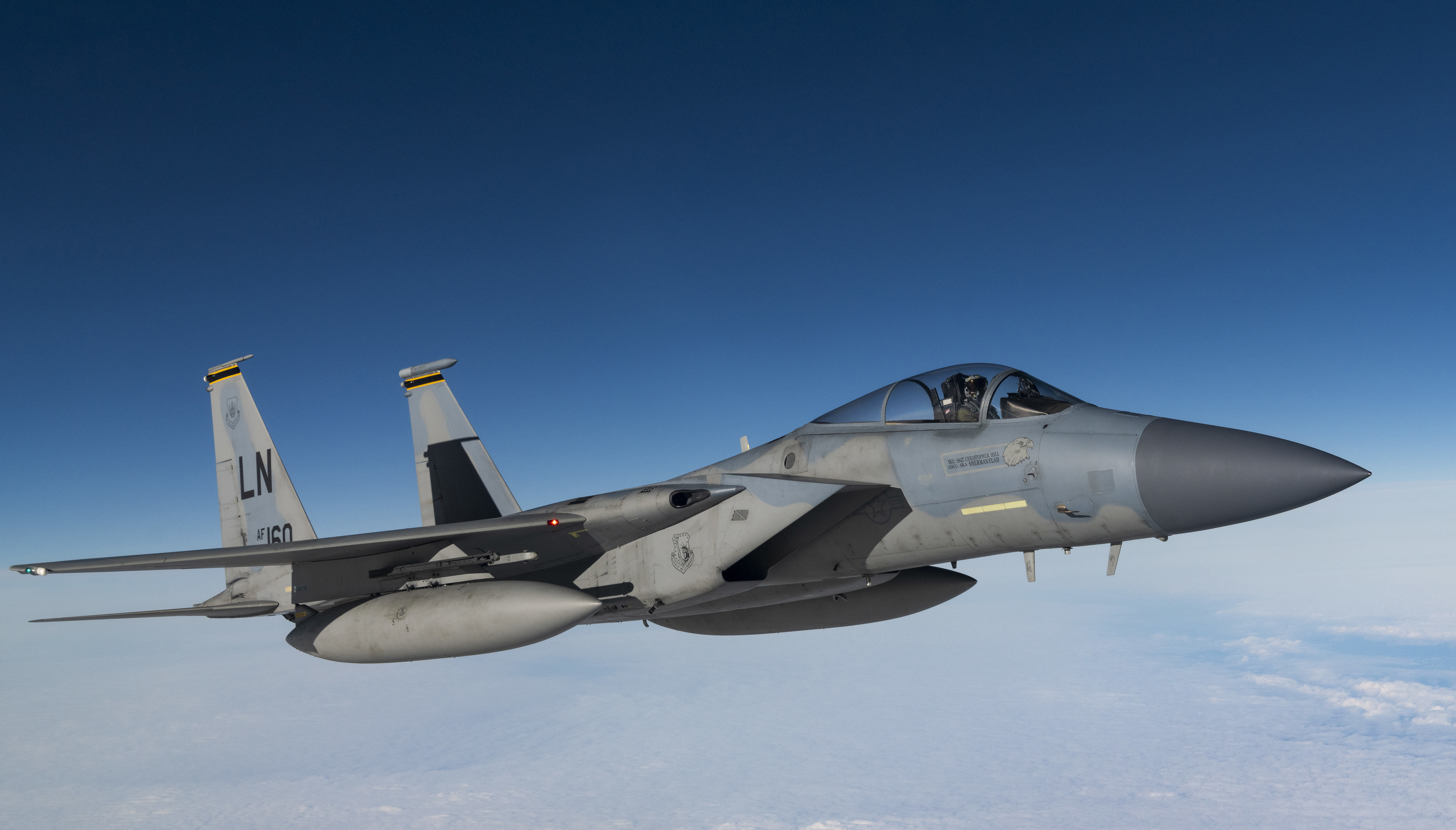
An F-15C, 86–0160, after firing four AIM-120B missiles during an exercise

In January 2015, the squadron was named the best fighter squadron in the Air Force, earning the Raytheon Trophy for 2014.

On 13 May 2017, the 493rd FS were awarded the 2016 Raytheon Trophy at the Imperial War Museum Duxford.

In April 2020, the Grim Reapers were awarded the 2019 Raytheon Trophy. On 15 June 2020, F-15C 86-0176 crashed into the North Sea during a training mission, killing the pilot.

During the prelude to the 2022 Russian invasion of Ukraine, the Grim Reapers deployed eight F-15C/Ds to Łask Air Base, Poland, in February 2022 to perform NATO enhanced Air Policing (eAP). It was the last NATO mission the squadron undertook with the F-15C.

The 493rd's last F-15C operational sortie was conducted on 21 April 2022. On 27 April 2022, the 493rd's last four F-15Cs (86-0160, 86-0171, 86-0172 and 86-0178) departed RAF Lakenheath for Barnes Air National Guard Base, Massachusetts, ending 45 years of Eagle air superiority operations in Europe.

=== F-35A Lightning II (2023–present) ===
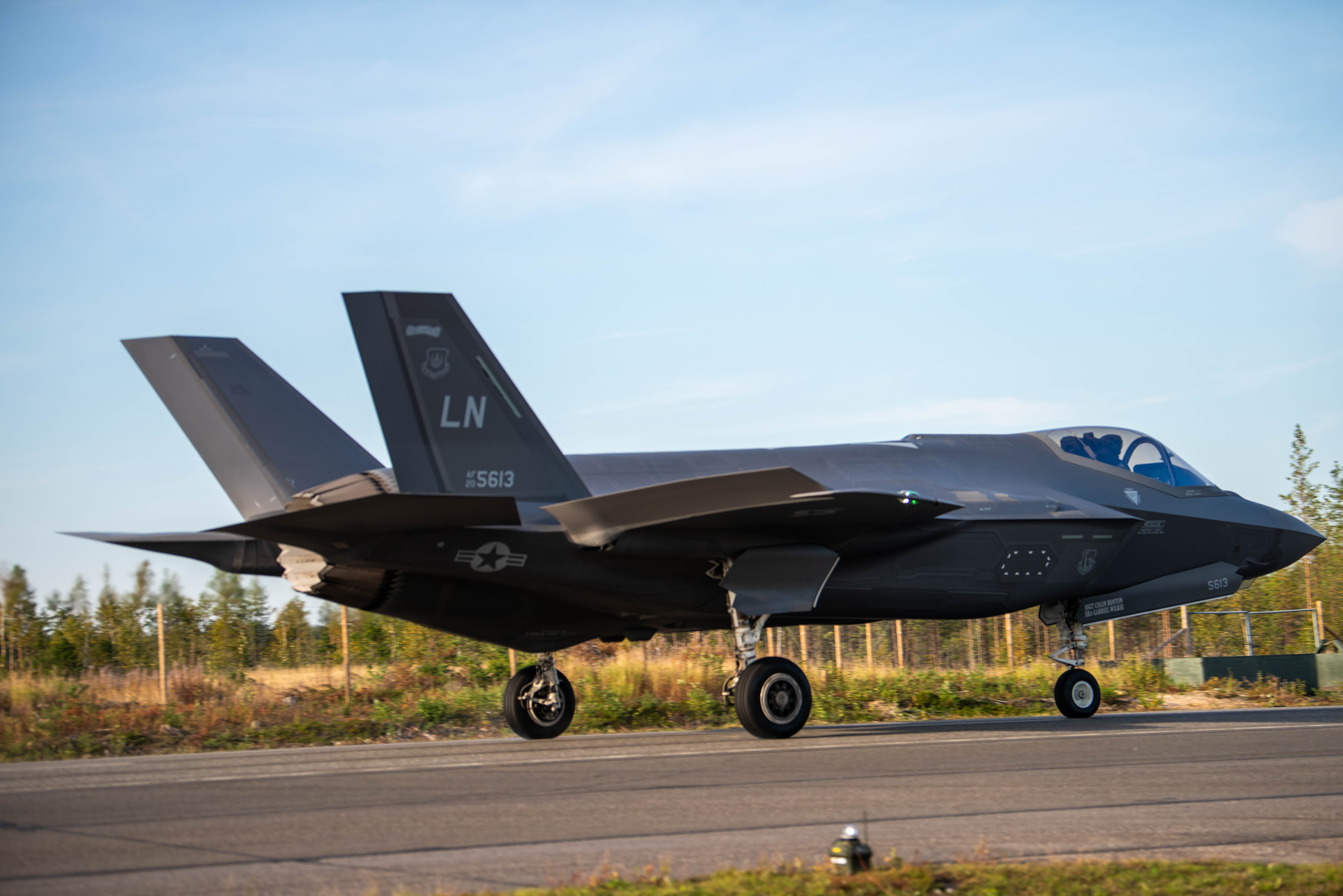
F-35A 20-5613 of the 493rd FS operating on a highway during an exercise in Finland, 2024

In January 2015, RAF Lakenheath was selected to host two squadrons of F-35A Lightning IIs. By 2021, the 493rd had been chosen to convert to the F-35A. Between September 2021 and April 2022, the 493rd FS divested its fleet of F-15C/Ds in preparation to re-equip and reactivate with the F-35A Lightning II. The Grim Reapers first F-35A, their flagship 19-5493, was delivered to RAF Lakenheath on 15 April 2022. The 493rd is expected to receive its full complement of F-35As by summer 2025, before achieving full operational capacity by the autumn.

In June 2023, the 748th Aircraft Maintenance Squadron was inactivated including its subordinate elements the 493rd and 495th AMUs. On June 9, the 493rd Fighter Generation Squadron and the 495th Fighter Generation Squadron were activated as separate squadrons.

In June 2025, twelve F-35A's from the Grim Reapers were deployed to the Middle East due to the tensions caused by the Twelve-Day War between Israel and Iran in the region.

== Lineage ==
- Constituted as the 56th Bombardment Squadron (Light) on 20 November 1940

Activated on 15 January 1941
Redesignated 56th Bombardment Squadron (Dive) on 28 August 1942
Redesignated 493d Fighter-Bomber Squadron on 10 August 1943
Redesignated 493d Fighter Squadron, Single Engine on 30 May 1944
Inactivated on 7 November 1945

- Redesignated 493d Fighter-Bomber Squadron on 25 June 1952

Activated on 10 July 1952
Redesignated 493d Tactical Fighter Squadron on 8 July 1958
Redesignated 493d Fighter Squadron on 1 October 1991
Inactivated on 18 December 1992

- Activated on 1 January 1994

=== Assignments ===
- 48th Bombardment Group (later 48th Fighter-Bomber Group, 48th Fighter Group), 15 January 1941 – 7 November 1945
- 48th Fighter-Bomber Group, 10 July 1952
- 48th Fighter-Bomber Wing (later 48th Tactical Fighter Wing, 48th Fighter Wing), 8 December 1957 – 18 December 1992

Attached to 48th Fighter Wing (Provisional), 2 September 1990 – 15 March 1991; 7440th Composite Wing, September – December 1991

- 48th Operations Group, 1 January 1994 – present

=== Stations ===
- Savannah Air Base, Georgia, 15 January 1941
- Will Rogers Field, Oklahoma, 23 May 1941
- Savannah Air Base (later Hunter Field), Georgia, 7 February 1942
- Key Field, Mississippi, 28 June 1942
- William Northern Field, Tennessee, 20 August 1943
- Walterboro Army Air Field, South Carolina, 27 January – 13 March 1944
- RAF Ibsley (AAF-347), England, 29 March 1944
- Deux Jumeaux Airfield (A-4), France, 18 June 1944
- Villacoublay Airfield (A-42), France, 29 August 1944
- Cambrai/Niergnies Airfield (A-74), France, 15 September 1944
- Sint-Truiden (Saint Trond) Airfield (A-92), Belgium, 30 September 1944
- Kelz Airfield (Y-54), Germany, 26 March 1945
- Kassel-Rothwesten Airfield (R-12), Germany, 18 April 1945
- Illesheim Airfield (R-10), Germany, 25 April 1945
- Laon, France, 5 July – August 1945
- Seymour Johnson Field, North Carolina, 9 September – 7 November 1945
- Chaumont Air Base, France, 10 July 1952
- RAF Lakenheath, England, 11 January 1960 – present

Deployed to Ta’if, Saudi Arabia, 2 September 1990 – 15 March 1991; Incirlik Air Base, Turkey, September – December 1991

=== Aircraft ===
- Curtiss A-18 Shrike (1941)
- Douglas A-20 Havoc (1941–1942)
- Vultee A-35 Vengeance (1942–1943)
- Curtiss P-40 Warhawk (1943)
- Bell P-39 Airacobra (1943–1944)
- Republic P-47 Thunderbolt (1944–1945)
- Republic F-84G Thunderjet (1952–1954)
- North American F-86F Sabre (1953–1956)
- North American F-100D Super Sabre (1956–1972)
- McDonnell Douglas F-4D Phantom II (1972–1977)
- General Dynamics F-111F Aardvark (1977–1992)
- McDonnell Douglas F-15C/D Eagle (1993–2022)
- Lockheed Martin F-35A Lightning II (2023–present)

== See also ==
- List of United States Air Force fighter squadrons
- List of F-4 Phantom II operators
- List of F-100 units of the United States Air Force
- List of F-86 Sabre units
- List of Douglas A-20 Havoc operators
