= Quartier Général d'Aboville =

Quartier General d'Aboville
- Part of Armée de Terre
- Located near: Chaumont, Haute-Marne, France
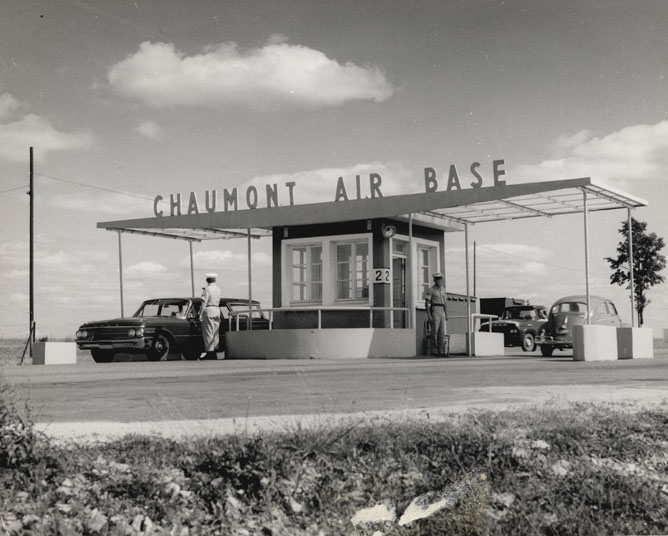
- Main Gate - 1962

Site information
- Controlled by: Armée de Terre

Location
- Location of Chaumont-Semoutiers Air Base, France
- Coordinates: 48°04′47″N 5°03′01″E

Site history
- Built: 1951
- In use: 1952 – present

Garrison information
- Garrison: 61^{e} Régiment d'artillerie (61e RA) Aerial Surveillance Regiment

Airfield information
- IATA: XCW; ICAO: LFJA

Summary
- Elevation AMSL: 1,018 ft (310 m)
- Interactive map of Airfield information

Runways
Direction	Length		Surface
Direction	ft	m	Surface
1/19	9,900	3,017	Concrete

Quartier Général d'Aboville, formerly Chaumont-Semoutiers Air Base, is a French Army artillery base in France. It is located two miles (3.2 km) southwest of the city of Chaumont, Haute-Marne, just to the west of the Route Nationale 67 (N67) highway about 0.5 miles (0.80 km) north of Semoutiers-Montsaon in the Haute-Marne département of northeast France. During the early years of the Cold War, Chaumont-Semoutiers air base was used by United States Air Forces in Europe (USAFE).

== Origins ==
Starting in the mid-1930s, a grass airstrip was used near Chaumont by the French Air Force for training. After the fall of France, the German Luftwaffe also used the facility as a training station. After the war, the airstrip was left unused.

With the outbreak of the Cold War in the late 1940s, with the Berlin Airlift, negotiations began in November 1950 between France and the United States to establish air bases and station combat wings in France to increase NATO's force strength.

During the negotiations for selection of sites, the Second World War airfield at Chaumont was proposed for expansion into a modern air base. The airfield was unused since the war and there were no plans for French civil or military use. An agreement was reached to develop Chaumont into a United States Air Force (USAF) tactical fighter-bomber installation there by 1953.

== United States Air Force tenure ==
Construction of Chaumont-Semoutiers Air Base started on 25 January 1951, with much effort being made to have minimal facilities ready by November. Various delays, however, pushed runway construction back to October. Minimum facilities were ready for USAF use by April 1952. The entire facility was a work in progress, however, until 1956.

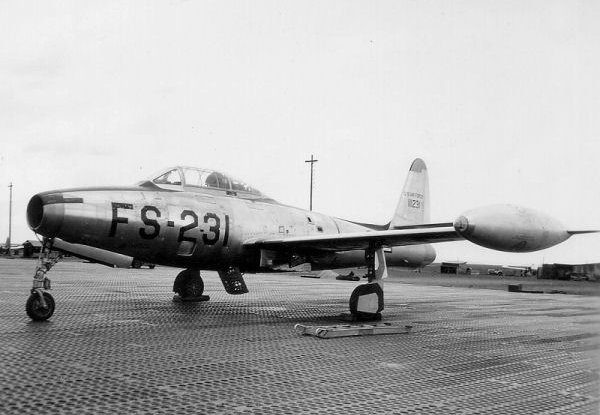
Republic F-84G-20-RE Thunderjet Serial No 51-1231 137th/48th Fighter Bomber Wing - 1953.

In May 1952, the 137th Fighter-Bomber Wing activated at Chaumont with the 125th, 127th, and 128th Fighter Squadrons flying the F-84G "Thunderjet". The squadrons were drawn from the Oklahoma, Kansas, and Georgia Air National Guards respectively.

The aircraft arrived at Chaumont on 25 June, being the first USAF tactical air fighters to be based permanently in France, albeit working mostly in tents and temporary wooden buildings on their new base.

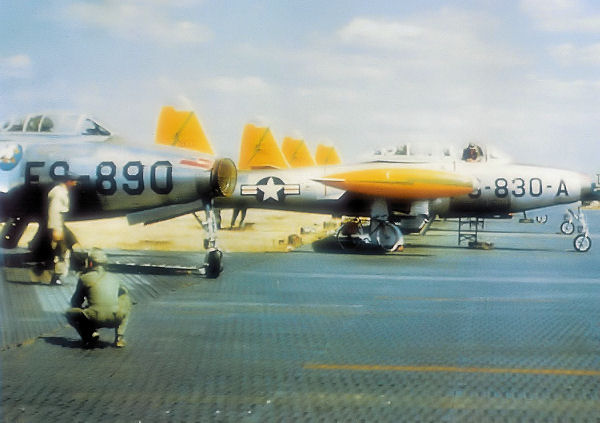
Republic F-84G-1-RE Thunderjets 51-890 of the 494th Fighter Bomber Squadron and 51-830 of the 493d FBS. Note the Pierced Steel Planking being used for the parking apron as concrete pads have not yet been poured. Both aircraft were eventually sold to the Belgian Air Force as Serials FZ-175 and FZ-199. 890 was destroyed on 25 May 1955 at Sylt, West Germany.

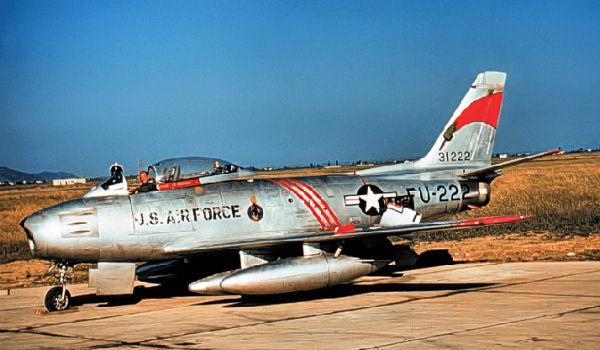
F-86F-35-NA Serial 53-1222 of the 494th Fighter-Bomber Squadron, 1955

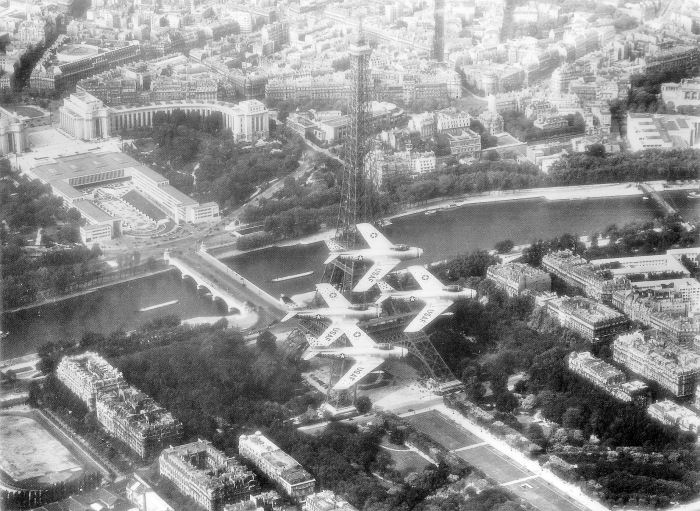
F-86Fs of the USAFE 48th Fighter-Bomber Wing "Skyblazers" aerobatic team performing over Paris - 1955

On 10 July 1952, the 48th Fighter-Bomber Wing activated and took over the mission from the 137 FBW. The 48th, with three fighter-bomber squadrons, the 492d, 493d, and 494th gained the personnel and equipment of the 137th FBW. The 137th FBW was reassigned without personnel and equipment, back to the control of the Oklahoma Air National Guard. The 58 F-84Gs and support aircraft were assigned to the 48th FBW. The few National Guardsmen still with the wing departed.

With the F-84, the 48th FBW formed part of the North Atlantic Treaty Organization's Allied Command Europe, participating in exercises with the United States Seventh Army. In addition, the 48th conducted operational readiness exercises and tactical evaluations. The 48th frequently deployed to Wheelus Air Base, Libya for training.

On 15 January 1960, the 48 TFW redeployed to RAF Lakenheath, UK. In the early morning, the wing's three fighter squadrons lifted off Chaumont's runway and, after making farewell passes over the outlying village, headed toward the English Channel.

With the departure of the 48th TFW, Chaumont-Semoutiers Air Base was placed in reserve status. The base became a satellite of Toul-Rosières Air Base, being maintained by the 7544th Combat Support Group.

=== 1961 Berlin Crisis ===
After almost two years without any permanent flying units, Chaumont Air Base was reactivated as part of Operation Tack Hammer, the United States response to the Berlin Crisis of 1961.

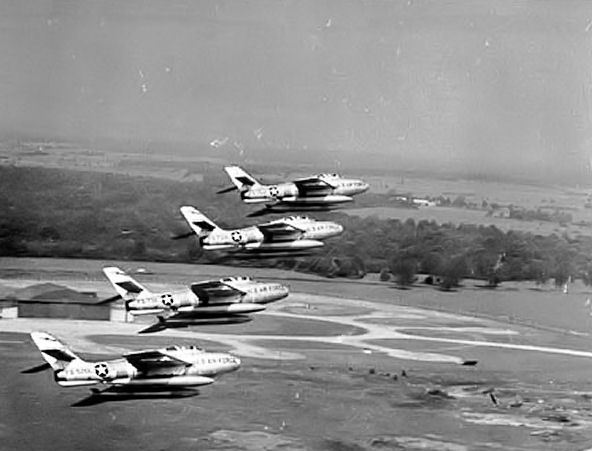
F-84Fs from the 7108th Tactical Wing in formation over Chaumont - 1962. With the end of the Berlin Crisis, these aircraft were reassigned to the 366th Tactical Fighter Wing.

On 1 October 1961, as a result of the Berlin crisis, the New Jersey Air National Guard (ANG) 108th Tactical Fighter Wing was ordered to active duty. When activated, the 108th consisted of the 119th, 141st, and 149th Tactical Fighter Squadrons. All three squadrons were flying the F-84F Thunderstreak. Only a portion of the 108th TFW deployed to France due to DoD budget limitations. This consisted of 28 F-84Fs of the 141st TFS and officers and airmen from all three squadrons, with the remaining aircraft and personnel remaining on active duty at their home stations. In France, the deployed elements of the 108th TFW were designated the 7108th Tactical Wing on 20 November due to the reduced strength of the wing in Europe.

The 106th Tactical Reconnaissance Squadron from the 7117th Tactical Wing at Dreux-Louvillier Air Base spent all its time in France flying from Chaumont. The 7108th departed from Chaumont and was relieved from active duty in August 1962.

=== 366th Tactical Fighter Wing ===
On 30 April 1962, the 366th Tactical Fighter Wing was activated and assigned to the United States Air Forces in Europe (USAFE). It had four Tactical Fighter Squadrons, formed by absorbing the assets and personnel of the Air National Guard squadrons rushed to Europe in the wake of the Berlin Crisis, then as the ANG personnel were demobilized, personnel were drawn from the active-duty ranks. On 8 May 1962 it was reassigned to Seventeenth Air Force. Each squadron flew 20 former ANG F-84Fs. It was split between four bases, with the 389th Tactical Fighter Squadron located at Chaumont.

On 26 April 1963, the 366 TFW was notified of its pending relocation to Holloman Air Force Base, New Mexico. The initial deployment of personnel began on 4 June. Personnel and equipment were either moved to Holloman, or reassigned throughout USAFE. The 366th officially departed Chaumont on 22 July 1963.

=== USAF closure ===
After the departure of the 366 TFW, Chaumont was placed in reserve status, being used occasionally for NATO exercises and deployments. A small USAF contingent, the 7366th Combat Support Group maintained the facilities. By the end of 1966, all USAF equipment was removed from Chaumont, and on 26 March 1967 the last American assigned left, and the installation was turned over to French control.

== Current uses ==
After the USAF withdrawal from France in 1967, the French Army took up residence at Chaumont, changing its name to Quartier General d'Aboville. The 403^{e} Régiment d'artillerie (403e RA) operated from the installation. Detachments of the Regiment participated in the 1991 Gulf War, the humanitarian intervention in Rwanda, peacekeeping operations in Lebanon and Bosnia and various internal security system operations of the 'Vigipirate' and 'Polmar' type. The Regiment was disbanded on 30 June 1999.

In 1999, the French Army 61^{e} Régiment d'artillerie (61e RA) Aerial Surveillance Regiment arrived at Chaumont equipped with the CL 289 drone.

The 61st Artillery regiment has deployed on NATO exercises to Bosnia and Kosovo.

In addition to the Army, the French militarised police Force (Gendarmerie Nationale) has also taken up residence at Chaumont-Semoutiers.
