= 48th Operations Group =

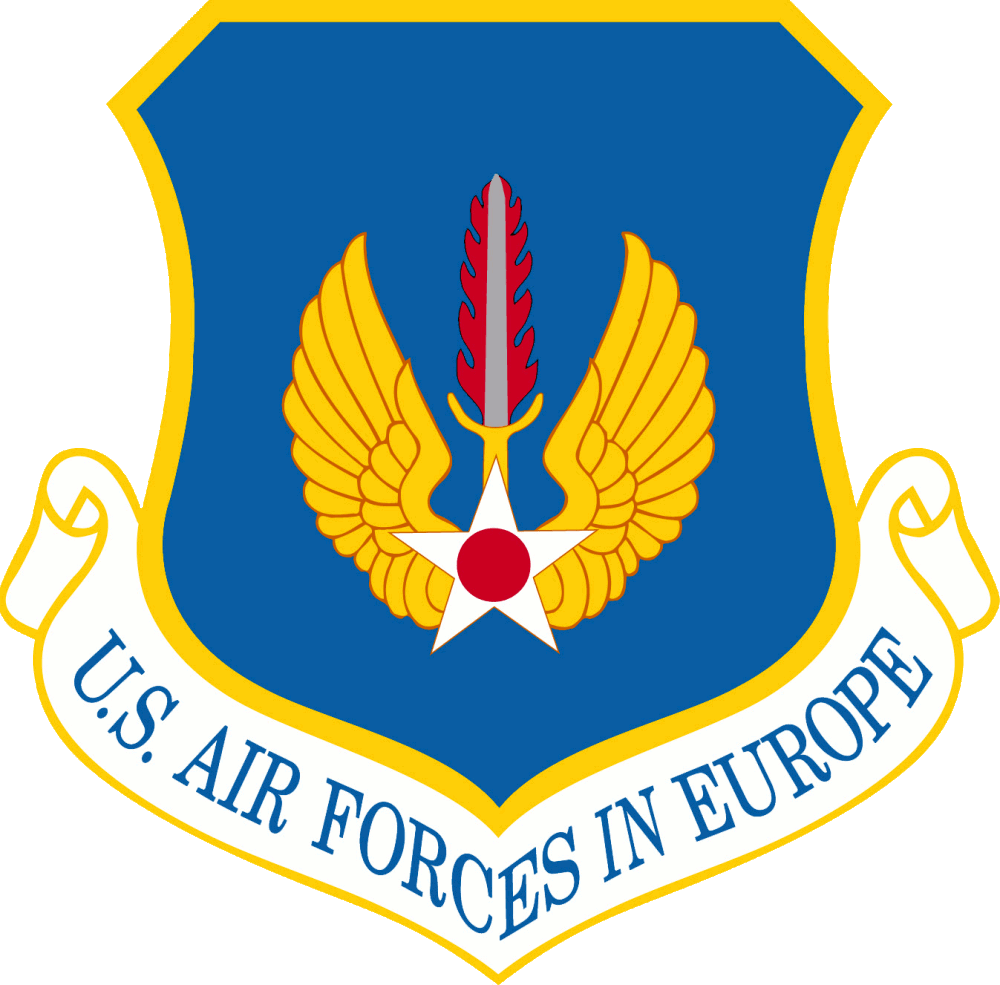
48th Operations Group

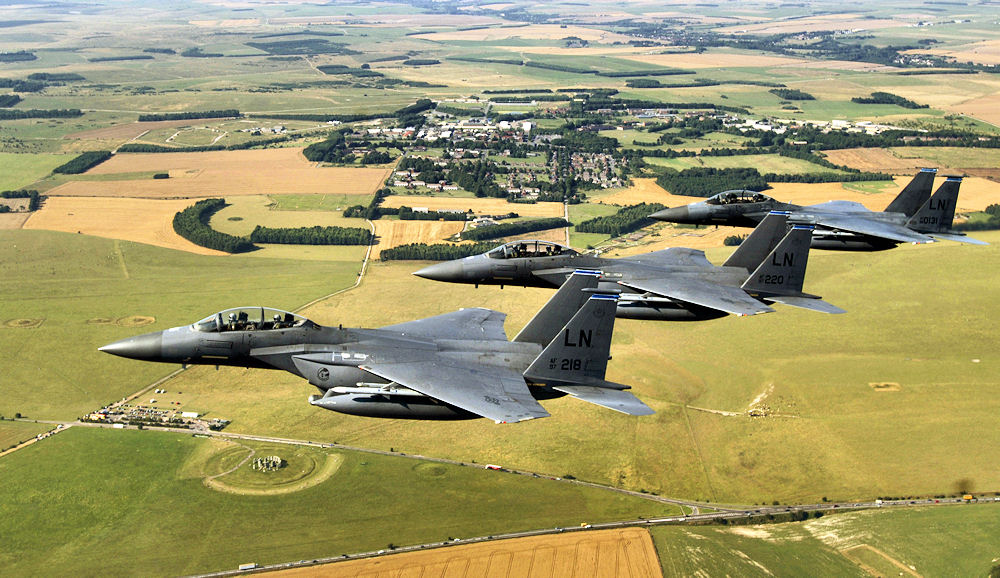
- 48th OG F-15E Strike Eagles over Stonehenge, Wiltshire, 2009
- Active: 1941–1945; 1952–1957; 1992–present
- Country: United States
- Branch: USAF
- Part of: United States Air Forces in Europe – Air Forces Africa
- Garrison/HQ: RAF Lakenheath
- Motto: Vulneratus non Victus (Latin for 'Unconquered Even Though Wounded')
- Engagements: World War II, Antisubmarine, American Theater; World War II, EAME Theater; Air Offensive, Europe; Normandy; Northern France; Rhineland; Ardennes-Alsace; Central Europe; Kosovo Air Campaign
- Decorations: Distinguished Unit Citation; Air Force Outstanding Unit Award (9×); Cited in the Orders of the Day, Belgian Army (3×); Belgian Fourragere

Commanders
- Current commander: Colonel Joshua Arki
- Notable commanders: David R. Iverson

Insignia
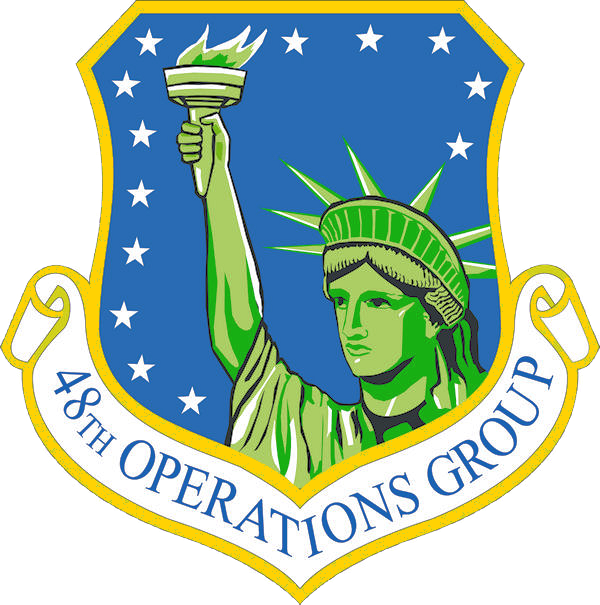
- 48th Fighter Wing Emblem
- Tail code: LN

The 48th Operations Group is the flying component of the 48th Fighter Wing, assigned to the United States Air Forces in Europe – Air Forces Africa. The group is stationed at RAF Lakenheath, England.

== Assigned Units ==
The 48th Operations Group (Tail Code: LN) consists of four flying squadrons of F-15C/D/E and F-35A aircraft capable of accomplishing fighter operations worldwide and one operations support squadron.

- 48th Operations Support Squadron

The 48th Operations Support Squadron, “Eagles”, provides the operational foundation for three squadrons of F-15C/D/Es, capable of providing fighter operations in support of war plans and contingency operations for USEUCOM, USAFRICOM, and NATO. Support provided by the 48th OSS includes flight and airfield management, air traffic control, weather, intelligence, weapons and tactics, scheduling, training, life support, operational plans and group administration.

- 492nd Fighter Squadron, nicknamed the Madhatters and the Bolars, equipped with F-15E Strike Eagle
- 493rd Fighter Squadron, nicknamed the Grim Reapers, equipped with F-35A Lightning II
- 494th Fighter Squadron, nicknamed the Panthers, equipped with F-15E Strike Eagle
- 495th Fighter Squadron, nicknamed the Valkyries, became the USAF's first overseas F-35A Lightning II squadron when it was reactivated on 1 October 2021 equipped with this type.

== History ==
For additional history and lineage, see 48th Fighter Wing

=== World War II ===
On 15 January 1941, the United States Army Air Corps activated the 48th Bombardment Group (Light) at Hunter Field, Savannah, Georgia, comprising the 55th, 56th, and 57th Bombardment Squadrons (Light) and the 9th Reconnaissance Squadron (Light).

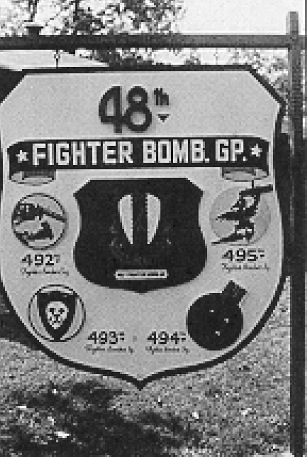
Headquarters Sign, 48th Fighter-Bomber Group, 1943

The 48th and its four flying squadrons served as a training unit, initially flying Douglas A-20 Havoc and B-18 Bolo twin-engine light bombers, later using A-24, A-31, A-35, and A-36 dive-bombers, and moving from Hunter Field, Georgia, to Will Rogers Field, Oklahoma, back to Savannah, Georgia, then on to Key Field, Mississippi.

On 15 August 1943 the group was re-designated the 48th Fighter-Bomber Group, with the flying squadrons re-designated as the 492d, 493d, 494th, and 495th Fighter-Bomber Squadrons. Moving to William Northern Field, Tennessee, they worked up to strength as an operational unit, flying the P-39 Airacobra and P-40 Warhawk.

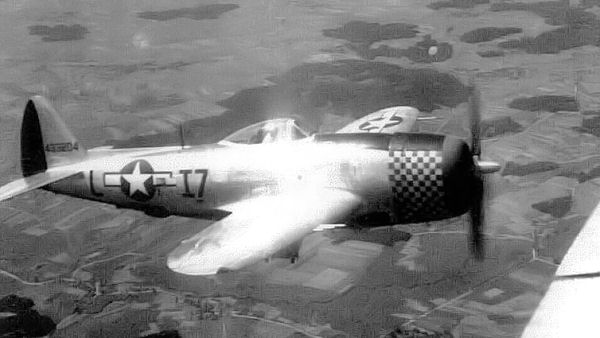
Republic P-47D Thunderbolt serial 44-33204 of the 493d Fighter Squadron

In early 1944, the 48th moved east to Walterboro Army Airfield, South Carolina, training with the P-47 Thunderbolt. From there the personnel travelled to New York, boarding the RMS Queen Mary on 21 March 1944 bound for Europe. In due course they arrived at RAF Ibsley in Southern England, and were assigned to the Ninth Air Force.

By this time, the 48th flew the Republic P-47D Thunderbolt and had the following fighter squadrons and fuselage codes:

- 492d Fighter Squadron (F4)
- 493d Fighter Squadron (I7)
- 494th Fighter Squadron (6M)

The group flew its first combat missions on 20 April 1944, an uneventful fighter sweep of the occupied French coast. The group and squadrons underwent another name change on 30 May 1944, becoming the 48th Fighter Group and the 492d, 493d, and 494th Fighter Squadrons.

On 6 June 1944, the 48th participated in D-day, the start of the liberation of France, which included more than 14,000 sorties flown by the allied air forces. The three squadrons assisted the Normandy invasion by dropping bombs on bridges and gun positions, attacking rail lines and trains, and providing visual reconnaissance reports. Over the course of the whole Normandy campaign, the 48th flew nearly 2,000 sorties, dropping nearly 500 tons of bombs and firing more than 160,000 rounds of ammunition.

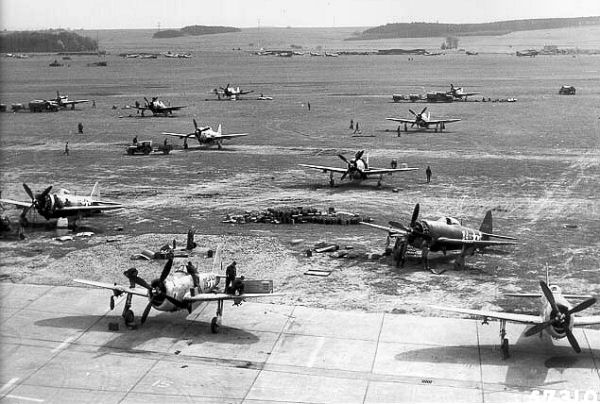
P-47Ds of the 48th Fighter Group at an Advanced Landing Ground (ALG) in France

On 18 June, the 48th along with the 492d and 493d Fighter Squadrons moved to Deux Jumeaux Airfield, Advanced Landing Ground (ALG) (A-4), France. The 494th Fighter Squadron followed on 4 July. From there, the 48th supported ground operations of Allied forces moving east across northern France: primarily providing support for the United States First Army. As the Allied armies continued their advance across France, through Belgium, and into Germany, the squadron occupied a succession of ALGs. During this period they received a Distinguished Unit Citation for their attack on German positions in Jülich, Germany, undertaken on 6 December 1944 in difficult weather and against heavy enemy fire. The 48th was also mentioned twice in Belgium's "Order of the Day".

Following the German surrender, the unit returned to the United States, and on 7 November 1945 the squadron was inactivated as part of the massive postwar drawdown.

=== Cold War ===
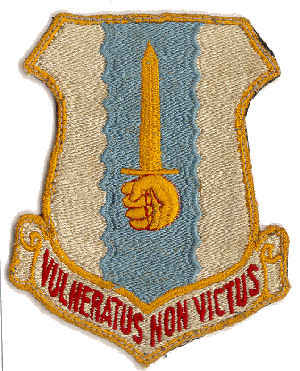
Original emblem of the 48th Fighter-Bomber Group, 1952

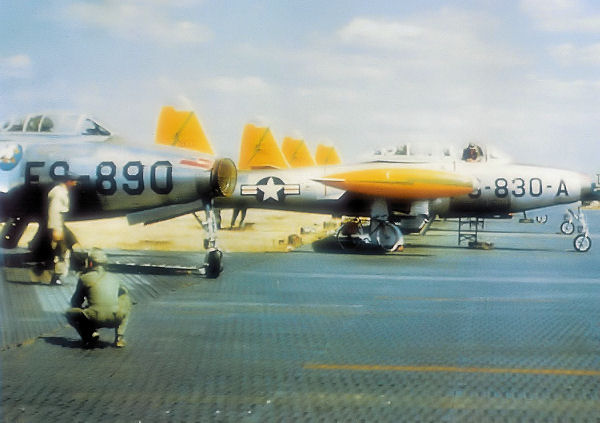
Republic F-84G Thunderjets 51–890 of the 494th Fighter Bomber Squadron and 51–830 of the 493d FBS. Note the Pierced Steel Planking being used for the parking apron as concrete pads have not yet been poured.

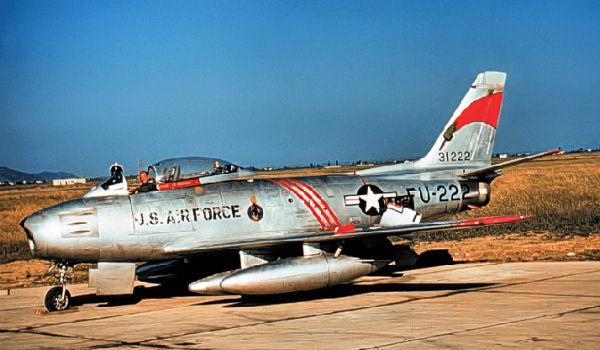
F-86F Serial 53-1222 of the 494th Fighter-Bomber Squadron, 1955

On 10 July 1952 the United States Air Force reactivated the group as the 48th Fighter-Bomber Group at Chaumont Air Base, where it assumed the mission, personnel and 58 Republic F-84G Thunderjets of the federalized Oklahoma Air National Guard 137th Fighter-Bomber Group, which was simultaneously inactivated and returned to state control. Similarly, the group's 492d, 493d and 494th Fighter-Bomber Squadrons replaced the 125th, 127th and 128th Squadrons of the 137th Group. The group and supporting units were assigned to the 48th Fighter-Bomber Wing under the wing base organization plan.

The few National Guardsmen still with the wing departed and the last were released from active duty on 9 July, although a few reserve officers remained on active duty for an additional six to twelve months.

Chaumont Air Base was still largely under construction at the time of the activation of the 48th FBG and living and working conditions were primitive. The men were billeted in tents that were heated by pot-bellied stoves; all of the roads on the base were yet unpaved and were basically mud ruts through the turf. The only hardened facilities were a concrete runway and a handful of tarpaper shacks. Within two years, the wing headed up an engineering project that resulted in the construction of permanent barracks, a wing headquarters, flightline shops, and warehouses

With the F-84, the 48 FBG supported NATO and the United States Air Forces in Europe (USAFE), activities, participating in exercises with the US Seventh Army. With the F-84, the wing supported the North Atlantic Treaty Organization (NATO) and United States Air Forces in Europe (USAFE), and participated in exercises with the Seventh United States Army. In addition, the wing conducted operational readiness exercises and tactical evaluations. The 48th frequently deployed to Wheelus Air Base, Libya, for training in bombing and gunnery skills.

In September 1953, the 48th FBG had become so proficient with the F-84 that it assumed the role of the "Skyblazers" aerial demonstration team in Europe from the 86th Fighter-Bomber Group and commenced flying air shows throughout Western Europe. They would continue with their F-84Gs until the spring of 1954 when the Group's Tunderjets were replaced by F-86F Sabres.

In late 1956, the Liberty Wing became USAFE's first unit to convert to the F-100 Super Sabre. However, at this time the Chaumont runway was closed for repair, which resulted in the wing deploying to Berrechid Airfield, Morocco (near Casablanca), to train with its new aircraft.

The group was inactivated on 8 December 1957 when its component squadrons were assigned directly to the 48th Fighter-Bomber Wing as the Air Force reorganized its wings into the tri-deputate system.

=== 1990s and twenty-first century ===
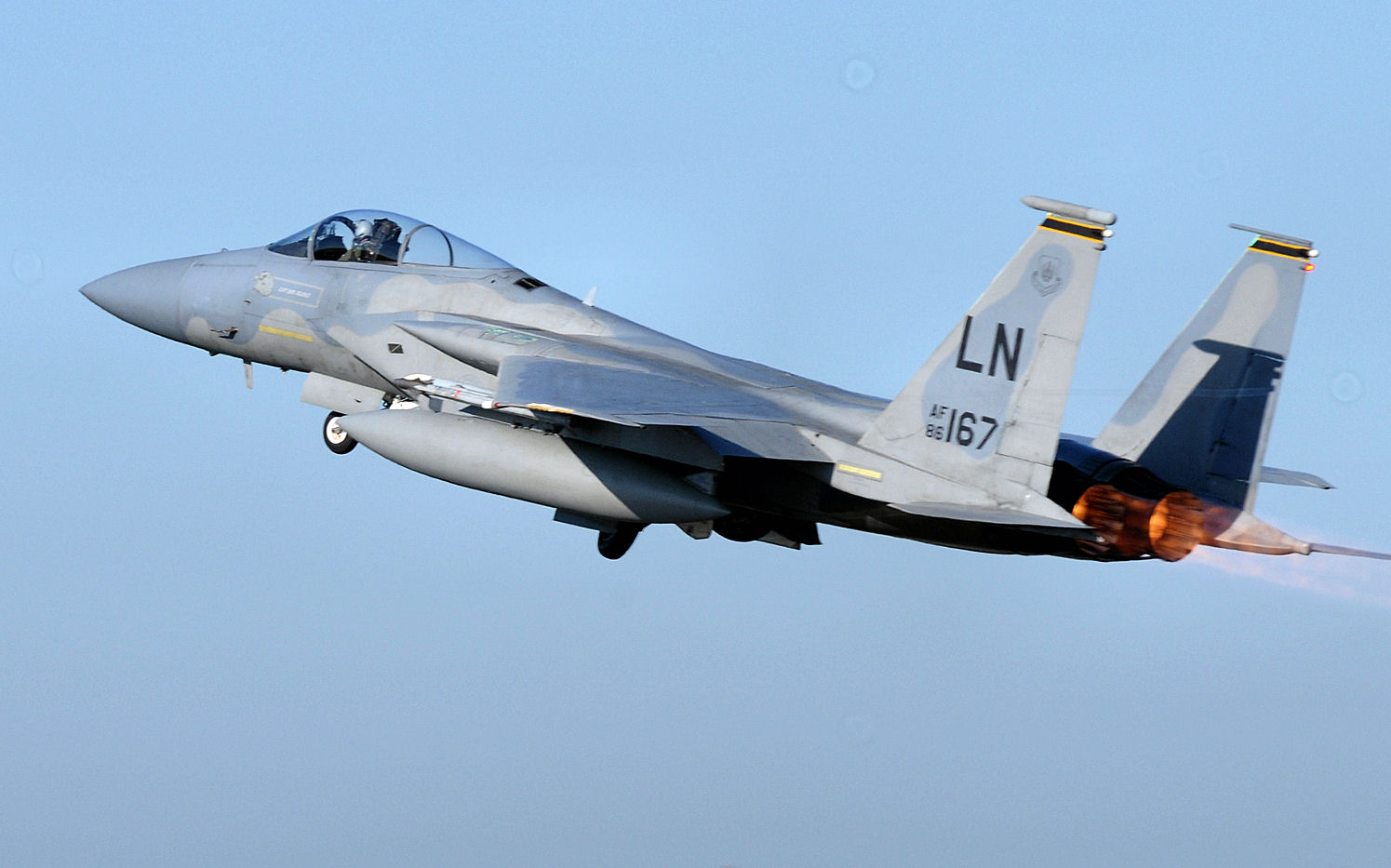
McDonnell Douglas F-15C Eagle 86–0167, 48th OG, 493rd FS

On 31 March 1992, the 48th Operations Group was activated as a result of the 48th Tactical Fighter Wing implementing the USAF objective wing organization. Upon activation, the 48th OG was bestowed the lineage and history of the 48th Fighter-Bomber Group and its predecessor organizations. The 48th OG was assigned the Fighter Squadrons previously assigned to the 48th Fighter Wing upon activation, all equipped with the General Dynamics F-111F. it phased out the F-111 aircraft and was equipped with F-15 aircraft, at first 2 squadrons of "E" model Strike Eagles and then later adding a full squadron of "C" & "D" model Eagles.

Lakenheath began to receive its first McDonnell Douglas F-15E Strike Eagles in 1992. With the departure of the F-111s, the 495th Fighter Squadron was inactivated on 13 December 1991. On 18 December 1992 the last F-111F departed the base. Along with the departure of the F-111F's, the 493d Fighter Squadron was also inactivated.

With the pending closure of Bitburg Air Base Germany on 25 February 1994 it was decided to reactivate the 493d as an F-15C/D squadron. Aircraft were transferred from Eglin AFB Florida and the 493d was reactivated on 1 January. The 493rd's arrival meant that the 48th became the largest F-15E/F-15C composite unit in the U.S. Air Force.

In August 1998 an F-15D (Serial 86–182) of the 493d Fighter Squadron paid a visit to Chaumont-Semoutiers Air Base (now called Quartier General d'Aboville), France for an open house static display. This was the first time a Statue of Liberty Wing aircraft was at its original air base in almost 40 years.

==== Balkan/Middle East Deployments ====
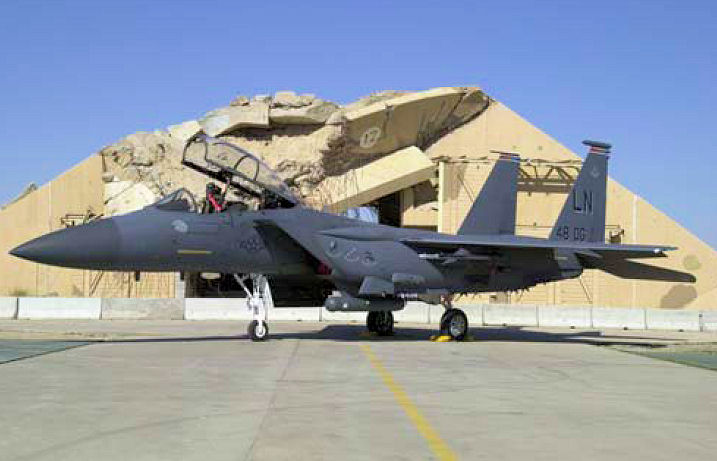
F-15E at Ahmed Al Jaber Air Base, Kuwait.

With its new weapon systems, the group began a hectic pace of deployments that would keep at least one squadron constantly deployed for nearly six years.

On 5 August 1993, the 492d Fighter Squadron conducted the wing's first F-15E deployment when it went to Incirlik Air Base, Turkey, under Operation PROVIDE COMFORT (succeeded by NORTHERN WATCH). Thirteen days after the 492d's arrival in Turkey, Iraq violated the exclusion zone by placing surface-to-air missiles outside of the city of Mosul. In spite of repeated warnings to remove the missiles, Iraqi forces failed to comply. On the afternoon of 18 August, Liberty Wing F-15Es struck the site, eliminating the missile threat.

For the remainder of the decade, the 492d and 494th continually rotated to Turkey and to Aviano Air Base, Italy, for participation in Operation DENY FLIGHT, supporting operations in the Balkans. Providing combat air patrol with F-15Cs, the 493d also rotated planes to Turkey and Italy. This series of deployments continued into the spring of 1999.

In February 1999, while the wing served another rotation in Turkey, acts of aggression by Serbia—the core of the Federal Republic of Yugoslavia—against its Albanian population in the province of Kosovo resulted in NATO intervention, culminating in Operation ALLIED FORCE.3 Strikes against Serbian targets began on 24 March 1999.

Within 72 hours, the 493d Expeditionary Fighter Squadron, stationed at Cervia Air Base, Italy, recorded four aerial victories over Serbian Mikoyan MiG-29s. The 492 and 494 FS flew combat mission from RAF Lakenheath and Aviono AB, Italy, respectively, and employed all the AGM-130 against Serbian Air Defenses. At the same time, the 494th Expeditionary Fighter Squadron, operating from Aviano Air Base, employed its precision guided munitions—including the first combat use of a GBU-28 Bunker Buster by an Air Force F-15E. Starting in May, the 492d Expeditionary Fighter Squadron launched combat operations directly from RAF Lakenheath, the first sustained combat operations flown from England since World War II.

During the air war over Serbia, the wing deployed 1,011 personnel to 18 different locations. The group's pilots and aircraft flew combat missions from three locations, using 69 aircraft. Those remaining at RAF Lakenheath not only made up for the work of those deployed, but also launched combat missions. Furthermore, they served as a supply point for their deployed counterparts, sending 3,871 tons of equipment to various locations. In all, the pilots of the 48th serving under expeditionary squadrons flew 2,562 sorties for more than 11,000 combat hours in less than three months, dropping approximately 3 million pounds of munitions and scoring four out of five confirmed Air Force aerial victories.

After ALLIED FORCE, the 48th was given a chance to reconstitute its forces for the first time in six years. During this period, the wing upgraded its F-15E fleet with new Block E-210 models. At the same time, the wing participated in training with its NATO allies through a series of deployments across continental Europe while receiving USAFE and NATO strike evaluations, tactical evaluations, and surety inspections. Yet the wing continued to prepare for future taskings, such as its Air Expeditionary Force (AEF) commitments.

For the first time since the Gulf War, in December 2000, the 48th's flying squadrons began deploying to the desert of Southwest Asia. As part of AEFs 2 and 4 respectively, the 494th and 492d Fighter Squadrons served as Operation SOUTHERN WATCH's precision guided munitions squadrons based at Ahmed Al Jabar Air Base, Kuwait. The units employed several munitions against Iraqi targets, racking up 690 sorties for 1,229 hours for the 494th in AEF 2 and 730 sorties for 1,173.9 hours for the 492d in AEF 4.

The 48th served as the lead wing force provider for the 363d Air Expeditionary Wing at Prince Sultan Air Base, Saudi Arabia, during AEF 4. The 493d also deployed to Prince Sultan and served as SOUTHERN WATCH's air superiority squadron, flying 893 sorties for 2,201.9 hours.

==== Global War on Terrorism ====
After the AEF 4 redeployment in June 2001, the 48th moved into its 10-month training period consisting of exercises and inspections, both at home and at events such as Weapons Training Deployments. However, this period was severely interrupted by 11 September 2001.

In response, President George W. Bush initiated Operation ENDURING FREEDOM—air and ground strikes against terrorist organizations and training camps in Afghanistan. "Great harm has been done to us. We have suffered great loss. And in our grief and anger we have found our mission and our moment. Freedom and fear are at war," stated President Bush.

As part of this operation, the 492d and 493d Fighter Squadrons deployed to support the humanitarian airlift operations from Ramstein Air Base, Germany. The F-15C and F-15E squadrons ensured air superiority and supremacy for C-17 aircraft delivering humanitarian daily rations to Afghan refugees in Afghanistan.

On 21 March 2003, Operation IRAQI FREEDOM began with airstrikes and ground attacks against the Iraqi military. Nearly 500 people from the Liberty Wing served in various roles and locations.

Since that time, the 48th OG has deployed to support Air Expeditionary Force commitments in Southwest Asia.

In late 2006, the 48th expanded its mission by adding the 56th Rescue Squadron and its five Sikorsky HH-60G Pave Hawk helicopters. The 56 RQS moved to RAF Lakenheath from NAS Keflavik, Iceland.

=== Lineage ===
- Established as 48th Bombardment Group (Light) on 20 November 1940

Activated on 15 January 1941
Redesignated: 48th Bombardment Group (Dive) on 28 August 1942
Redesignated: 48th Fighter-Bomber Group on 15 August 1943
Redesignated: 48th Fighter Group on 30 May 1944
Inactivated on 7 November 1945

- Redesignated 48th Fighter-Bomber Group on 25 June 1952

Activated on 10 July 1952
Inactivated on 8 December 1957
Redesignated: 48th Tactical Fighter Group on 31 July 1985 (Remained inactive)

- Redesignated: 48th Operations Group on 1 March 1992

Activated on 31 March 1992

=== Assignments ===
- 15th Bombardment Wing, 15 January 1941
- II Air Support (later, II Ground Air Support) Command, 1 September 1941
- XII Bomber Command, 2 May 1942
- III Bomber Command, 8 May 1942
- III Ground Air Support (later, III Air Support) Command, 10 August 1942
- III Fighter Command, 6 August 1943

Attached to I Air Support Command for operational control, 10 September 1943 – 14 January 1944

- IX Air Support (later, IX Tactical Air) Command, 31 March 1944
- XIX Tactical Air Command, 28 April 1945 – August 1945
- First Air Force, 9 September 1945 – 7 November 1945
- 48th Fighter-Bomber Wing, 10 July 1952 – 8 December 1957
- 48th Fighter Wing, 31 March 1992 – present

=== Components ===
- 55th Bombardment (later, 492d Fighter-Bomber, 492d Fighter) Squadron (F4): : 15 January 1941 – 20 August 1943, 20 August 1943 – November 1945; 10 July 1952 – 8 December 1957; 31 March 1992 – present
- 56th Bombardment (later, 493d Fighter-Bomber, 493d Fighter) Squadron (I7): 15 January 1941 – 20 August 1943, 20 August 1943 – November 1945; 10 July 1952 – 8 December 1957; 1 January 1994 – present
- 56th Rescue Squadron: 28 June 2006 – 15 May 2018
- 57th Rescue Squadron: 18 February 2015 – 15 May 2018
- 57th Bombardment (later, 494th Fighter-Bomber, 494th Fighter) Squadron (6M): : 15 January 1941 – 20 August 1943, 20 August 1943 – November 1945; 10 July 1952 – 8 December 1957; 31 March 1992 – present
- 88th Bombardment (later, 495th Fighter-Bomber, 495th Fighter) Squadron: 21 August 1941 – 10 August 1943, 10 August 1943 – 1 March 1944; 1 October 2021 – present

=== Stations ===
- Hunter Army Airfield, Georgia, 15 January 1941
- Will Rogers Field, Oklahoma, 26 May 1941
- Hunter Army Airfield, Georgia, 7 February 1942
- Key Field, Mississippi, 28 June 1942
- William Northern AAF, Tennessee, 20 August 1943
- Walterboro Army Airfield, South Carolina, 27 January – 13 March 1944
- RAF Ibsley (AAF-347), England, 31 March 1944
- Deux Jumeaux Airfield (A-4), France, 18 June 1944
- Villacoublay Airfield (A-42), France, 29 August 1944
- Cambrai/Niergnies Airfield (A-74), France, 15 September 1944
- Sint-Truiden Airfield (A-92), Belgium, 30 September 1944
- Kelz Airfield (Y-54), Germany, 26 March 1945
- Kassel-Rothwestern Airfield (R-12), Germany, 17 April 1945
- Illesheim Airfield (R-10), Germany, 29 April 1945
- Laon, France (Ground Echelon), 5 July 1945 – August 1945
- Seymour Johnson Field, North Carolina, 9 September 1945 – 7 November 1945
- Chaumont-Semoutiers Air Base, France, 10 July 1952 – 8 December 1957
- RAF Lakenheath, England, 31 March 1992 – present

=== Aircraft assigned ===
- Douglas A-20 Havoc, 1941–1944
- Douglas A-24 Banshee, 1941–1944
- Vultee A-35 Vengeance, 1941–1944
- Douglas B-18 Bolo, 1941–1944
- Bell P-39 Airacobra, 1941–1944
- Curtiss P-40 Warhawk, 1941–1944
- Vultee A-31 Vengeance, 1941–1944
- North American A-36 Apache, 1941–1944
- Republic P-47 Thunderbolt, 1944–1945
- Republic F-84G Thunderjet, 1952–1953
- North American F-86F Sabre, 1954–1957
- General Dynamics F-111F Aardvark, 1992
- McDonnell Douglas F-15E Strike Eagle, 1992–present
- McDonnell Douglas F-15C/D Eagle, 1994–2022
- Sikorsky HH-60G Pave Hawk, 2004–2018
- Lockheed Martin F-35A Lightning II, 2021–present
