= Deux Jumeaux Airfield =

Deux Jumeaux Airfield Advanced Landing Ground (ALG) A-4
- Calvados, Basse-Normandie Region, France
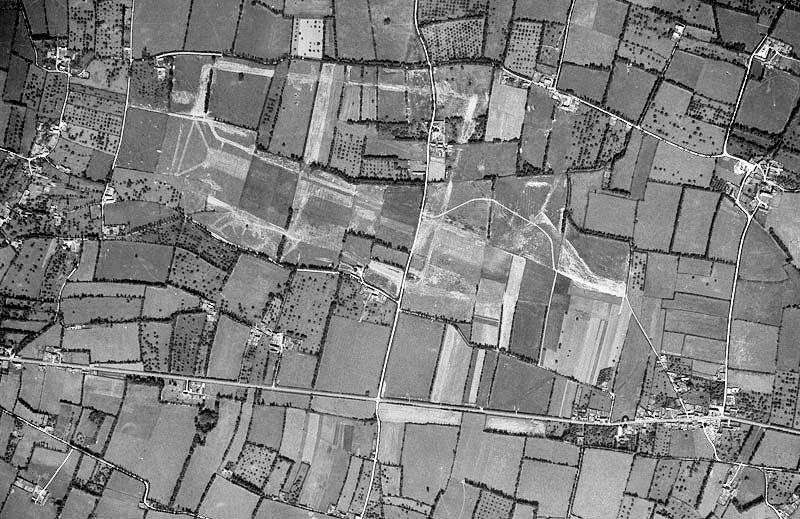
- Remains of Deux Jumeaux Airfield after dismantling

Site information
- Type: Military Airfield
- Controlled by: United States Army Air Forces

Location
- Coordinates: 49°20′52″N 000°58′50″W

Site history
- Built by: IX Engineering Command
- In use: June–September 1944
- Materials: Square-Mesh Track (SMT)
- Battles/wars: World War II - EAME Theater: Normandy Campaign; Northern France Campaign

Garrison information
- Garrison: Ninth Air Force
- Occupants: 48th Fighter Group

Airfield information
Runways
Direction	Length and surface
11/29	1,500 m (4,900 ft) SMT/PSP
- One runway, 4 alert pads, 50 hardstands

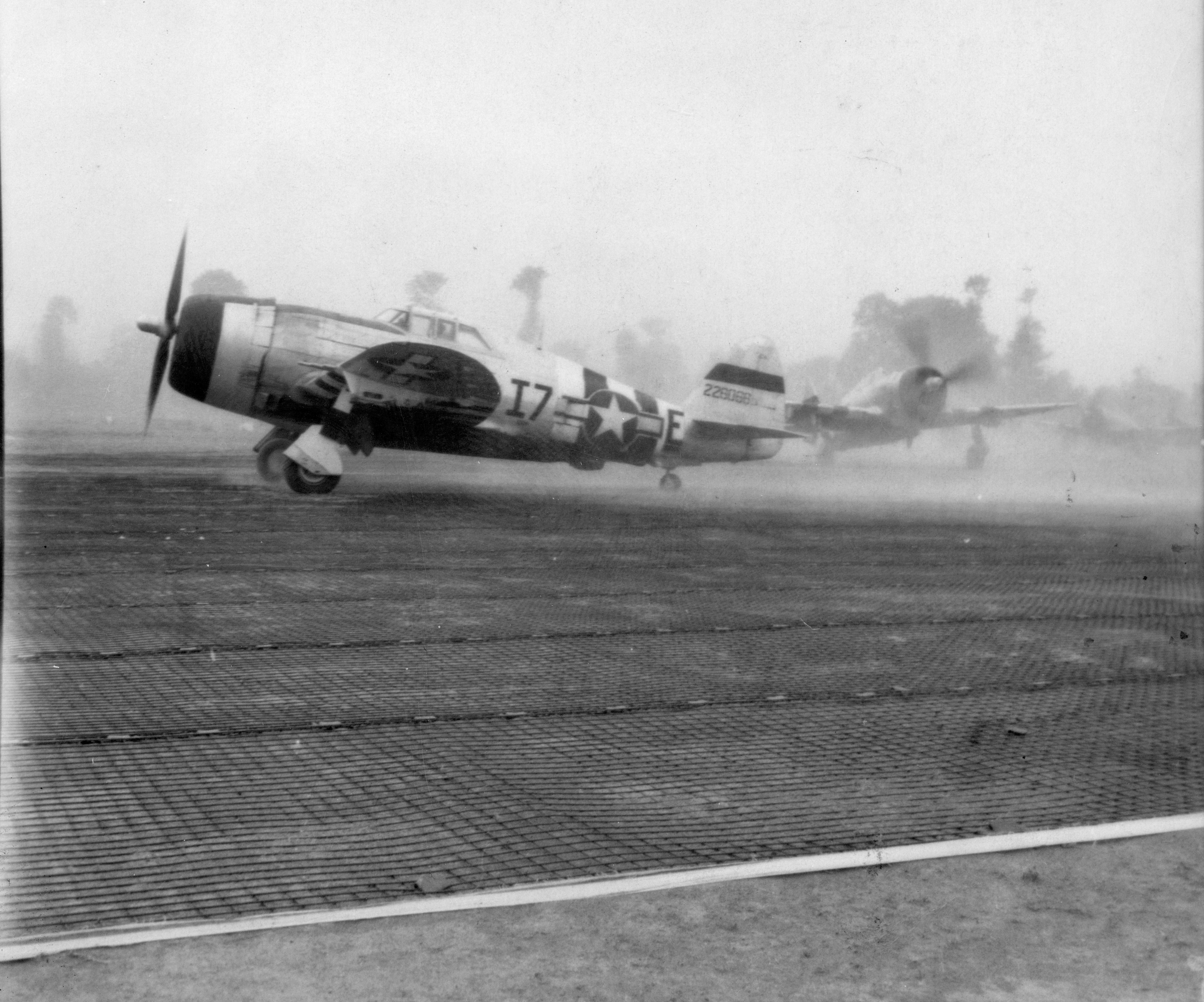
P-47 Thunderbolts of the 48th Fighter Group line up for take off at Deux Jumeaux Airfield

Deux Jumeaux Airfield is an abandoned World War II military airfield, which is located near the commune of Deux Jumeaux in the Normandy region of northern France.

Located just outside of Deux Jumeaux, the United States Army Air Force established a temporary airfield on 14 June 1944, shortly after the Allied landings in France. The airfield was one of the first established in the liberated area of Normandy, being constructed by the IX Engineering Command, 816th Engineer Aviation Battalion.

== History ==
Known as Advanced Landing Ground "A-4", the airfield consisted of a single 5000' (1500m) Square-Mesh Track runway aligned 11/29. In addition, with tents were used for billeting and also for support facilities; an access road was built to the existing road infrastructure; a dump for supplies, ammunition, and gasoline drums, along with a drinkable water and minimal electrical grid for communications and station lighting.

The fighter planes flew support missions during the Allied invasion of Normandy, patrolling roads in front of the beachhead; strafing German military vehicles and dropping bombs on gun emplacements, anti-aircraft artillery and concentrations of German troops in Normandy and Brittany when spotted.

The main unit using Deux Jummeaux airfield was the 48th Fighter Group, however, it was also used by the P-38 Lightnings of the 485th Squadron of the 370th Fighter Group from RAF Andover in Hampshire, England in late July 1944. The lack of airfields built in France led to a lack of space at the beginning of the Battle of Normandy. The staff of the 9th Air Force, under pressure from SHAEF to "explode" the sacred unity of the Group to send squadrons in different fields already well established.

After the Americans moved east into Central France with the advancing Allied Armies, the airfield was left un-garrisoned and used for resupply and casualty evacuation. It was closed on 15 September 1944 and the land returned to agricultural use.

== Major units assigned ==
- 48th Fighter Group 18 June - 29 August 1944

492d (F4), 493d (I7), 494th (6M) Fighter Squadrons (P-47D)

== Current use ==
Today the airfield is a mixture of various agricultural fields. A memorial to the men and units that were stationed at Deux Jumeaux was placed near the site of the former airfield. It is located to the east of La Cambe along the D204, 340 meters north of the bridge on the N13.

== See also ==
- Advanced Landing Ground
