= Cambrai-Niergnies Airport =

Cambrai-Niergnies Airport Aerodrome de Cambrai-Niergnies
- IATA: none; ICAO: LFYG

Summary
- Location: Cambrai, France
- Elevation AMSL: 312 ft / 95 m
- Coordinates: 50°08′08″N 003°15′53″E

Map
- Location of Cambrai-Niergnies Airport

Runways
Direction	Length		Surface
Direction	ft	m	Surface
09/27	2,953	900	Asphalt

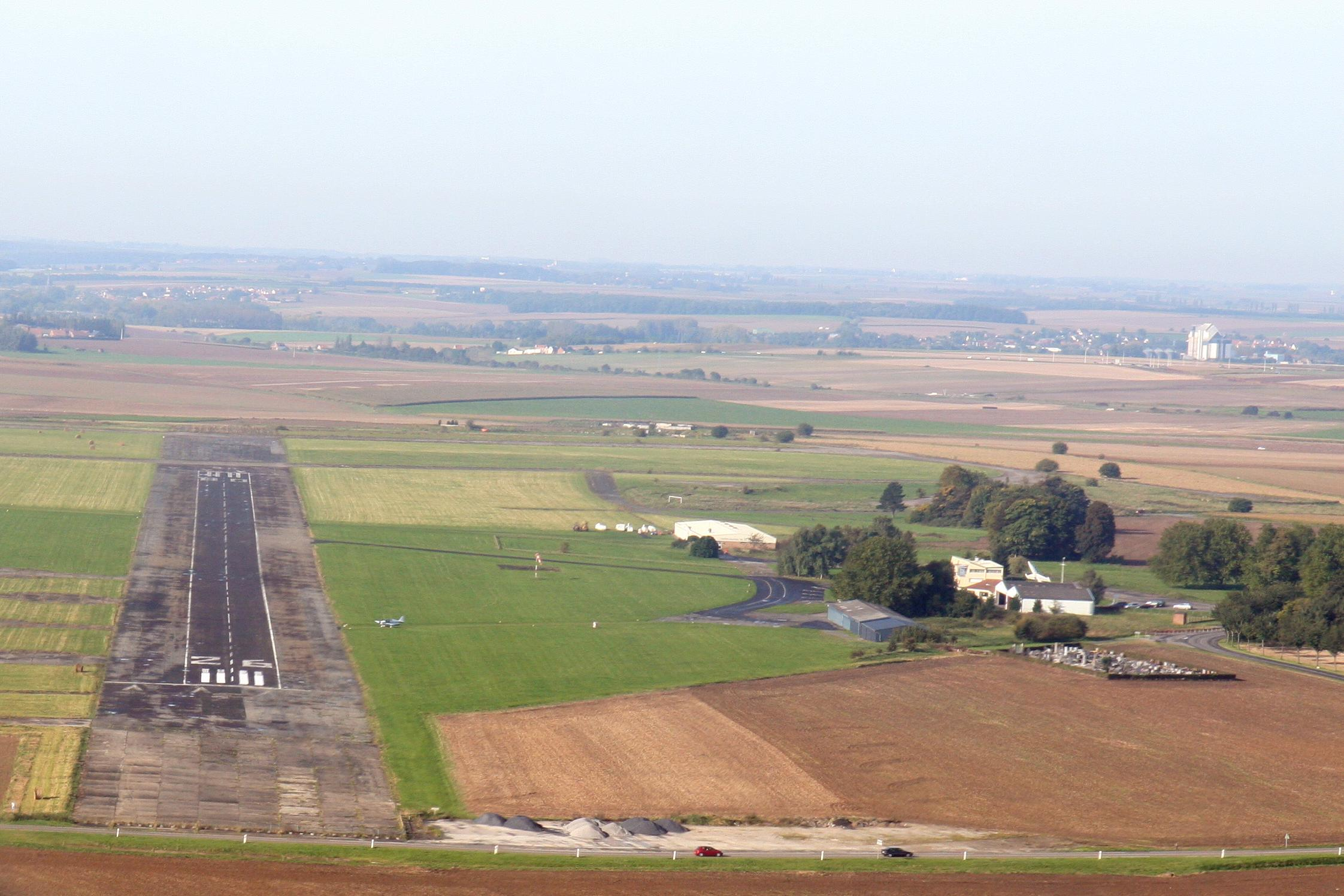
Runway 26 of Niergnies airport

Cambrai-Niergnies Airport (ICAO: LFYG) is a regional airport in France, located 3 miles (4.8 km) south-southeast of Cambrai; 100 miles (160 km) north-northeast of Paris.

It supports general aviation with no commercial airline service scheduled.

== History ==
Niergnies Airport was a pre-World War II civil airport, consisting of a terminal, hangar, some support buildings and a grass airfield, serving the nearby city of Cambrai.

=== German use during World War II ===
It was seized by the Germans in late May 1940 during the early part of the Battle of France. It was briefly used as a fighter airfield by Jagdgeschwader 3 (JG 3) in late May, participating in the Blitzkrieg against the French Army and British Expeditionary Force flying Messerschmitt Bf 109Es.

After the battle, the airfield was not used by the Luftwaffe for several years. In 1943, the Germans laid down two 1600m all-weather concrete runways at the airport, aligned 15/33 and 09/27. Large numbers of aircraft dispersal pads, maintenance shops, hangars and other support facilities were also built. Presumably, this was due to the fortification of the Pas-de-Calais, being believed by the Germans that when the Americans and British tried to land in France to open a Second Front, the airfield would have a key role in the defense of France. This construction drew the attention of the USAAF Ninth Air Force, which attacked the airfield on 1st and 2d December 1943 with Martin B-26 Marauder medium bombers (322d, 387th Bombardment Groups), severely damaging the facility. The airfield was not used again by the Germans.

=== American use ===
American Ninth Army units moved through the area in early September 1944, heading towards Cambrai. On 10 September The IX Engineer Command 862d Engineer Aviation Battalion moved in and began a quick rehabilitation of the base so it could be used by American aircraft. The engineers filled bomb craters and laid Pierced Steel Planking over the damaged areas of the 15/33 runway, and patched the 08/26 runway with asphalt and tarmac. In addition to the airfield, tents were used for billeting and also for support facilities; an access road was built to the existing road infrastructure; a dump for supplies, ammunition, and gasoline drums, along with drinkable water and minimal electrical grid for communications and station lighting. It was declared operationally ready for Ninth Air Force combat units on 12 September, only a few days after its capture from German forces, being designated as Advanced Landing Ground "A-74 Cambrai/Niergnies Airfield"

It hosted the following known Ninth Air Force units:

- 48th Fighter Group, 15–30 September 1944 (P-47)
- 394th Bombardment Group, 6 October 1944 – 2 May 1945 (B-26)

When the combat units moved out, Niergnies was turned over to the French Air Ministry on 30 June 1945.

=== Postwar/NATO use ===
In French control after the war, the base sat abandoned for several years. There was much unexploded ordnance at the site which needed to be removed, as well as the wreckage of German and American aircraft. Many of the buildings at the base were destroyed by the war, and although some had been repaired by the American combat engineers, most were in ruins. The French Air Force had no interest in the airfield and there was no money available to restore the commercial airport that existed before the war. As a result, the Air Ministry leased the land, concrete runways, structures and all, out to farmers for agricultural use, sending in unexploded ordnance teams to remove the dangerous munitions.

In 1950 when as a result of the Cold War threat of the Soviet Union, the air base at Cambrai-Niergnies was offered to the United States Air Force by the French Air Ministry as part of their NATO commitment to establish a modern air base at the site. NATO faced several problems when attempting to solve the air power survival equation. Planning for a Warsaw Pact first strike survival in both conventional and nuclear wars had to be considered. The main air bases were built on small parcels of land with very limited dispersal space. It was decided to use Cambrai-Niergnies as an emergency "backup" airfield, consisting of a "bare bones" facility of a runway with minimal facilities intended for use by all NATO air forces to disperse their aircraft in case of war.

Beginning about 1953, French demolition companies returned to Laon-Athies and began demolishing the German structures and removing the wreckage of the World War II air base. French Army Explosive demolition teams were brought in to safely remove unexploded ordnance remaining from the war and the site was prepared for construction. A modern all-weather concrete NATO jet runway was laid down aligned 17/35 over one of the former German runways, with alert pads for two fighter squadrons on each end of the runway. The extensive Luftwaffe dispersal pads and taxiways were also refurbished and integrated into the new base. Along the new NW/SE taxiway a circular marguerite system of hardstands which could be revetted later with earth for added aircraft protection was built. In addition, the wartime 08/26 runway had the wartime repairs removed and was totally refurbished, giving the airfield two operational runways. When completed, the base could accommodate about three or four squadrons of aircraft, 50 total.

However, other than the occasional touch-and-go landing of NATO (USAF) aircraft, Cambrai-Niergnies Air Base was never used. With the French withdrawal from the integrated military component of NATO in 1967, the base was abandoned.

=== Civil use ===
With the NATO facility closed, the facility was turned over by the French Air Ministry to the local government. A small part of the large NATO air base has been converted into a civil airport, with about 3000' of the 5000' 08/26 secondary runway being maintained as the airport's runway. Parallel to the runway, a short grass runway has been built for glider use. An asphalt taxiway connects the runway to a small parking/ramp area used by light aircraft, with what appears to be NATO-era buildings being used as support buildings for the airport and several hangars.

The expensive NATO airfield still exists, complete with runways, taxiways, and dispersals, deteriorating after 40 years of abandonment. Expansion joints in the concrete are starting to separate the various concrete pads, and a few of the dispersals have large amounts of vegetation growing on them, presumably through the cracks in the concrete. From the air, the airfield appears frozen in time, a complete, well-equipped Cold War air base that was never used.

== See also ==
- Advanced Landing Ground
