= David R. Iverson =

US Air Force officer (born c. 1969)

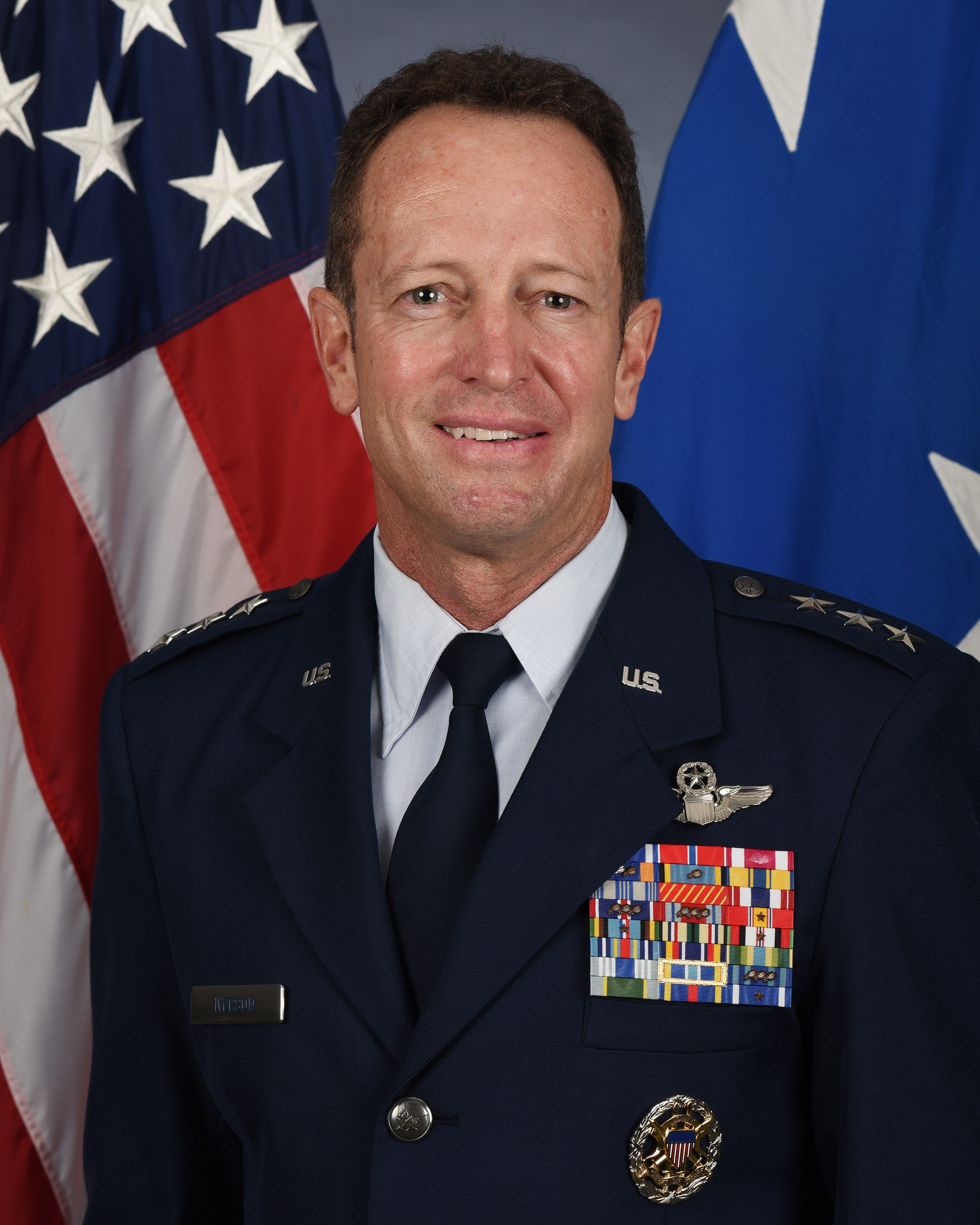
- Official portrait, 2024
- Born: c. 1969 (age 56–57)
- Education: University of Virginia (BA)
- Military career
- Allegiance: United States
- Branch: United States Air Force
- Service years: 1991–present
- Rank: Lieutenant General
- Commands: Seventh Air Force; Thirteenth Expeditionary Air Force; 332d Air Expeditionary Wing; 366th Fighter Wing; 609th Air and Space Operations Center; 492nd Fighter Squadron
- Conflicts: War in Afghanistan
- Awards: Legion of Merit (2); Distinguished Flying Cross with "V" device Bronze Star Medal (3)

David R. Iverson (born c. 1969) is a United States Air Force lieutenant general who serves as the deputy commander of United States Forces Korea, commander of the Air Component Command of the United Nations Command, commander of the Air Component Command of the ROK/US Combined Forces Command, and commander of the Seventh Air Force. He previously served as the director of air and cyberspace operations of Pacific Air Forces.

Prior to that, he served as the Vice Director for Joint Force Development (J7) on the Joint Staff from July 2019 to July 2021. Supporting Vice Admiral Stuart B. Munsch, then the Director, J7, Iverson provided oversight and direction of a diverse organization that provides for joint training, joint force development, concept development, operational analysis and lesson-learned activities to achieve the chairman's vision for the National Military Strategy. Before this assignment, he served as the Commanding General of the 332nd Air Expeditionary Wing from June 2018 to June 2019.

Iverson received his commission in 1991 through Air Force ROTC at the University of Virginia. Following Euro-NATO Joint Jet Pilot Training at Sheppard Air Force Base, Texas, he was assigned to fly the F-15E Strike Eagle. He has served in a variety of flying duties to include Evaluator and Instructor, Flight Commander, Chief of Weapons, Director of Operations and Commander at the squadron level. He has commanded at the flight, squadron, and twice at the wing level. He also served as a Congressional Legislative Liaison and the 609th Air and Space Operations Center Commander, Al Udeid Air Base, Qatar.

Iverson is a Command Pilot with over 5,400 hours of flight time, including over 1,500 combat hours. He has primarily flown the T-37 Tweet, T-38 Talon, F-15E Strike Eagle, and F-15SG.

== Education ==
- 1991 Bachelor of Arts, University of Virginia, Charlottesville, Virginia
- 1998 Squadron Officer School, Maxwell Air Force Base, Alabama
- 2003 Air Command and Staff College, Maxwell AFB, Alabama by correspondence
- 2011 Air War College, Air University, Maxwell AFB, Alabama

== Military career ==
In April 2021, Iverson was assigned to become the director of air and cyberspace operations of the Pacific Air Forces, replacing Major General Lansing Pilch.

In April 2023, Iverson was nominated for promotion to lieutenant general and assignment as deputy commander of the United States Forces Korea, commander of the Combined Forces Command, United Nations Command, commander of the Combined Air Component Command, Combined Forces Command, and commander of the Seventh Air Force.

== Military assignments ==
1. February 1992 – June 1993, Student, Euro-NATO Joint Jet Pilot Training and Lead in Fighter Training, Sheppard Air Force Base, Texas
2. June 1993 – April 1994, Student, F-15E Replacement Training Unit, Luke AFB, Ariz.
3. April 1994 – July 1997, Instructor/Scheduler/Weapons Officer, 90th Fighter Squadron, Elmendorf AFB, Alaska
4. July 1997 – January 1998, F-15E Strike Eagle Weapons Instructor Course, Nellis AFB, Nev.
5. January 1998 – August 2000, Flight Commander/Chief of Weapons, 335th Fighter Squadron, Seymour Johnson AFB, N.C.
6. August 2000 – January 2002, F-15E Strike Eagle Chief Force Development and Evaluation, 28th Training Squadron/Detachment 1, Nellis AFB, Nev.
7. January 2002 – June 2003, F-15E Strike Eagle Chief Tactics Development and Evaluation, 28TS/Det 1, Nellis AFB, Nev.
8. June 2003 – March 2005, Checkmate Division, AF/XOOC, the Pentagon, Arlington, Virginia
9. March 2005 – October 2006, Secretary of the Air Force Legislative Liaison, SAF/LLW, the Pentagon, Arlington, Virginia
10. October 2006 – May 2007, Chief, Advanced Programs Office, 48th Fighter Wing, RAF Lakenheath, United Kingdom
11. May 2007 – October 2008, Director of Operations, 492d Fighter Squadron, RAF Lakenheath, U.K.
12. November 2008 – February 2010, Commander, 492d Fighter Squadron, RAF Lakenheath, U.K.
13. February 2010 – May 2010, Deputy Commander, 48th Operations Group, RAF Lakenheath, U.K.
14. July 2010 – May 2011, Air War College, Air University, Maxwell AFB, Ala.
15. August 2011 – August 2012, Commander, 609th Air and Space Operations Center, Al Udeid Air Base, Qatar
16. August 2012 – July 2013, Chief, Secretary of the Air Force Congressional Action Division, SAF/LLZ, the Pentagon, Arlington, Virginia
17. July 2013 – February 2014, Director of Operations (J3), U.S. Forces Japan, Yokota AB, Japan
18. February 2014 – March 2016, Commander, 366th Fighter Wing, Mountain Home AFB, Idaho
19. April 2016 – February 2017, Senior Military Advisor to the Undersecretary of the Air Force, the Pentagon, Arlington, Virginia
20. February 2017 – June 2018, Senior Military Advisor to the Secretary of the Air Force, the Pentagon, Arlington, Virginia
21. June 2018 – June 2019, Commander, 332d Air Expeditionary Wing, Southwest Asia
22. July 2019 – July 2021, Vice Director for Joint Force Development, J7 the Joint Staff, Arlington, Virginia
23. July 2021 – January 2024, Director of Air and Cyberspace Operations, Pacific Air Forces and Commander, Thirteenth Expeditionary Air Force, Joint Base Pearl Harbor–Hickam, Hawaii
24. January 2024–present, Deputy Commander, United States Forces Korea; Commander, Air Component Command, United Nations Command; Commander, Air Component Command, Combined Forces Command; and Commander, Seventh Air Force, Pacific Air Forces, Osan AB, Republic of Korea

== Effective dates of promotion ==
Insignia	Rank	Date of rank
	Second Lieutenant	18 May 1991
	First Lieutenant	1 May 1993
	Captain	1 September 1995
	Major	1 March 2002
	Lieutenant Colonel	1 April 2006
	Colonel	1 August 2011
	Brigadier General	2 August 2017
	Major General	1 December 2019
	Lieutenant General	30 January 2024

Military offices
Preceded by William Liquori	Senior Military Assistant to the Under Secretary of the Air Force; 2016–2017	Succeeded by Douglas Schiess
Preceded by Kristin E. Goodwin	Senior Military Advisor to the Secretary of the Air Force; 2017–2018	Succeeded by Daniel Tulley
Preceded by Kyle W. Robinson	Commander of the 332nd Air Expeditionary Wing; 2018–2019	Succeeded by Mark Slocum
Preceded by Dirk D. Smith	Vice Director for Joint Force Development of the Joint Staff; 2019–2021	Succeeded by Daniel H. Tulley
Preceded by Lansing Pilch	Director of Air and Cyberspace Operations of the Pacific Air Forces and Commander of the Thirteenth Expeditionary Air Force; 2021–2024	Succeeded by Brandon D. Parker
Preceded by Scott L. Pleus	Commander of the Seventh Air Force; 2024–present	Incumbent
