= 609th Air Operations Center =

Active US Air Force unit

609th Air Operations Center

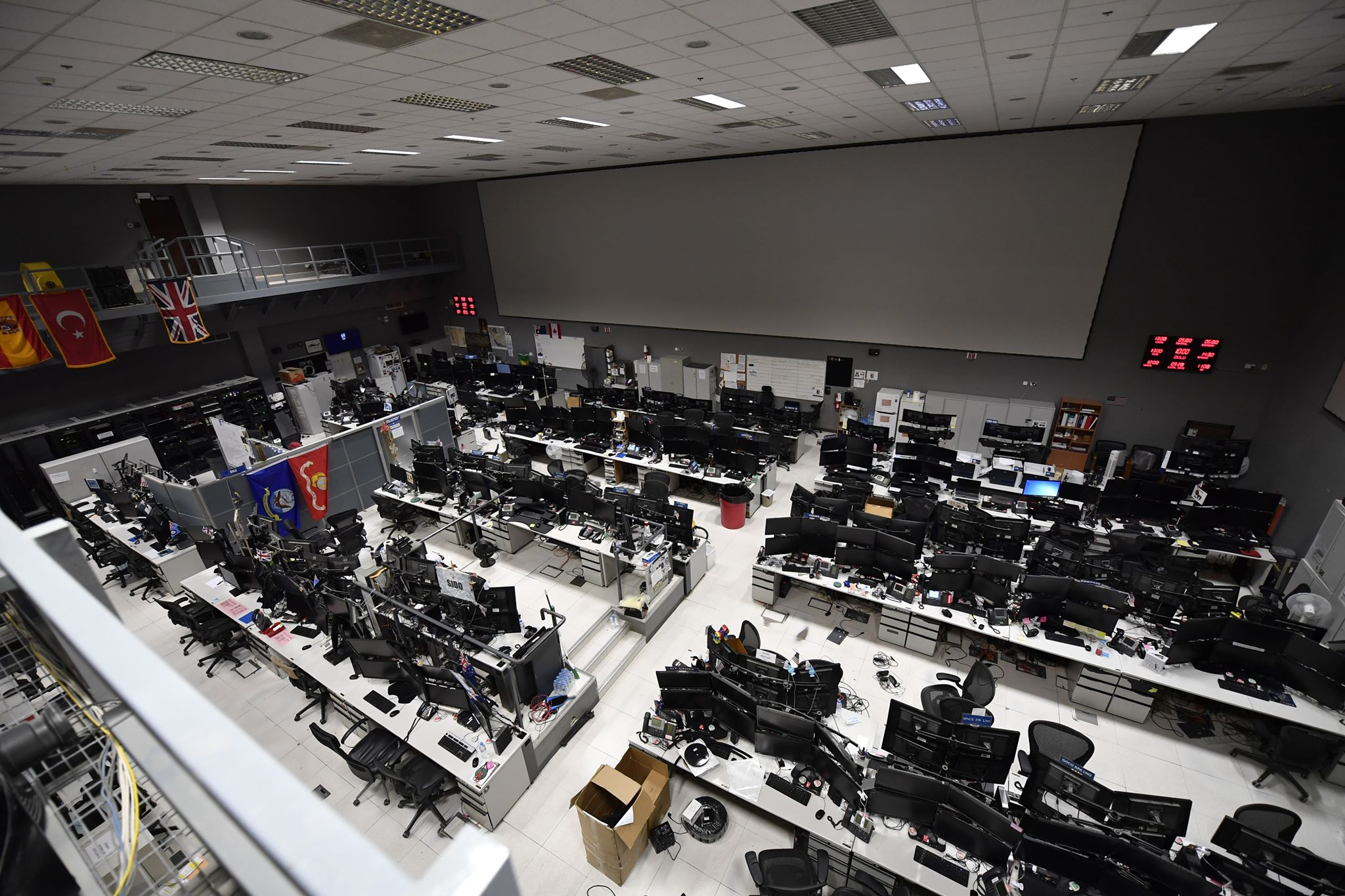
- The Combined Air Operations Center at Al Udeid in 2019
- Active: 1 January 1994 – present (32 years, 9 months)
- Country: United States
- Branch: United States Air Force
- Role: Command and control
- Part of: Air Combat Command: Ninth Air Force
- Garrison/HQ: Al Udeid AB, Qatar
- Engagements: Global war on terrorism

- Decorations: Air Force Meritorious Unit Award Air Force Outstanding Unit Award

Commanders
- Notable commanders: Maj Gen David R. Iverson

Insignia
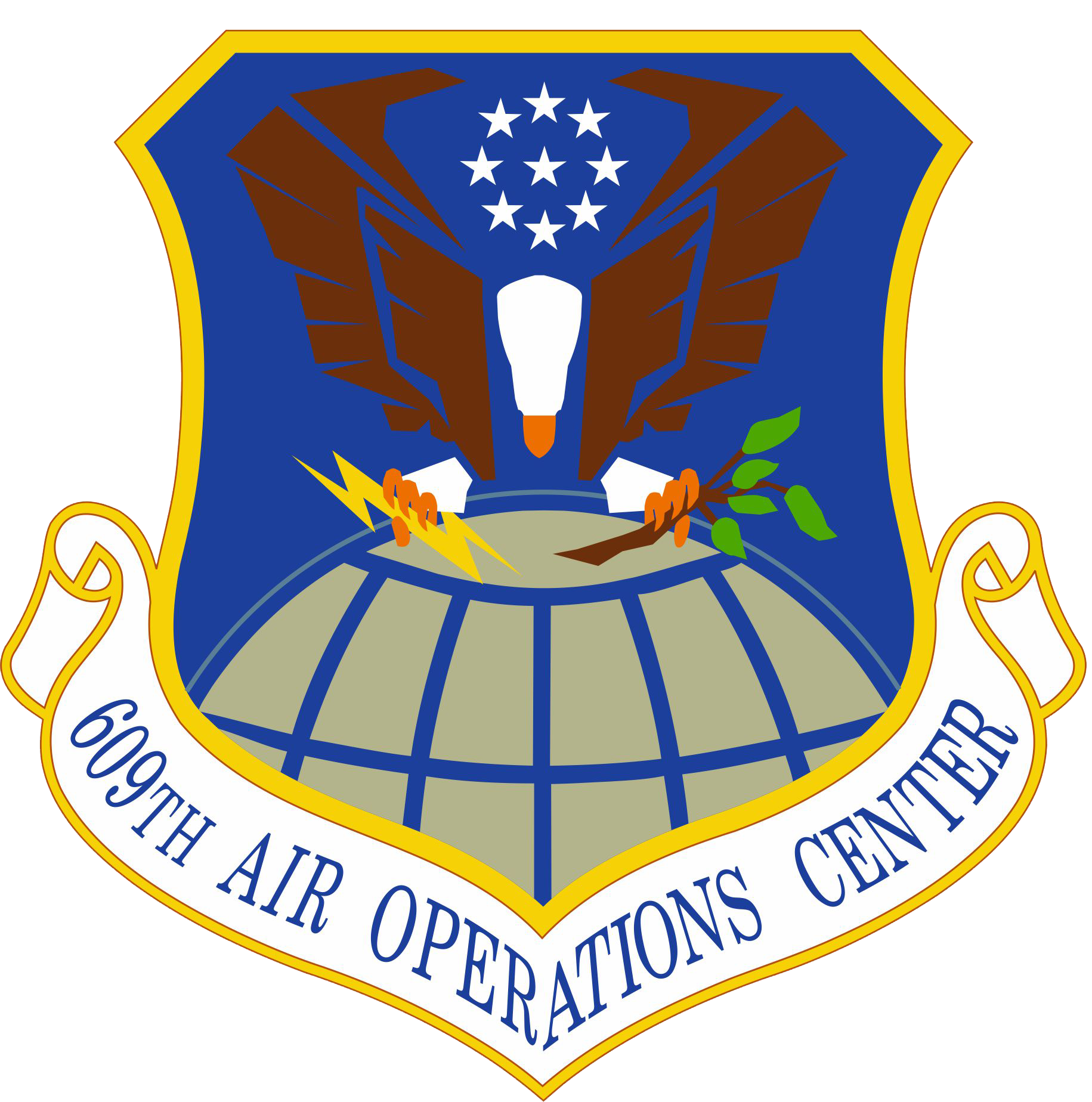
- 609th Air Operations Center emblem (Approved 23 January 2004, modified 6 April 2015)

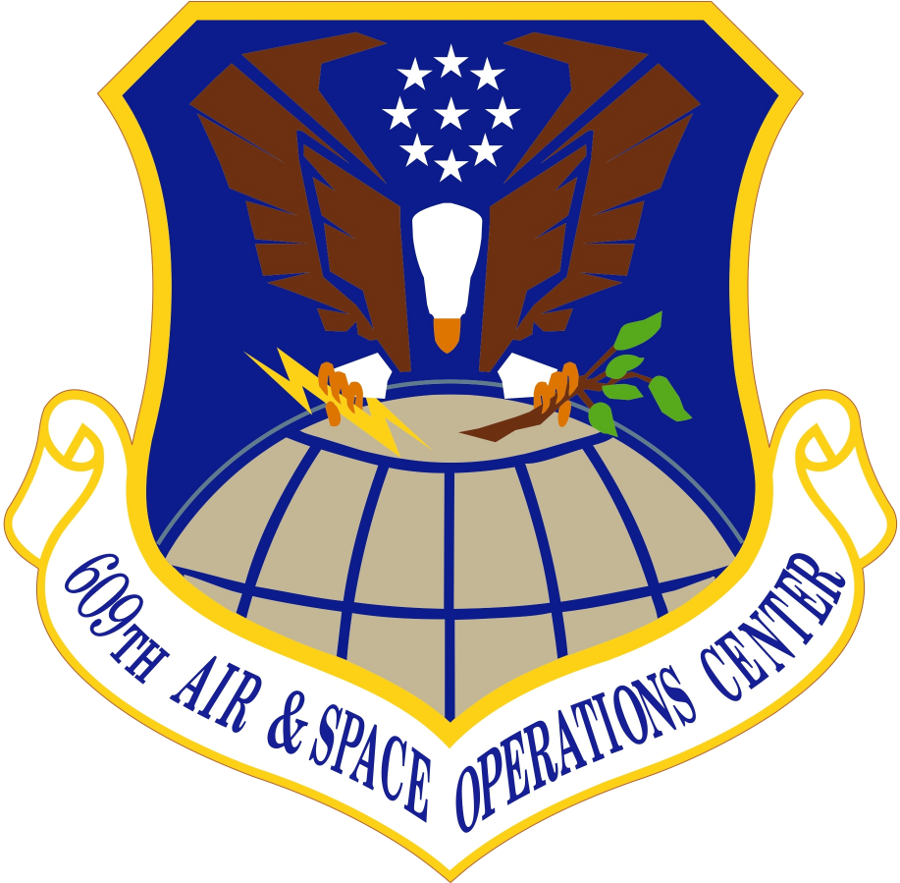
- 609th Air and Space Operations Center emblem

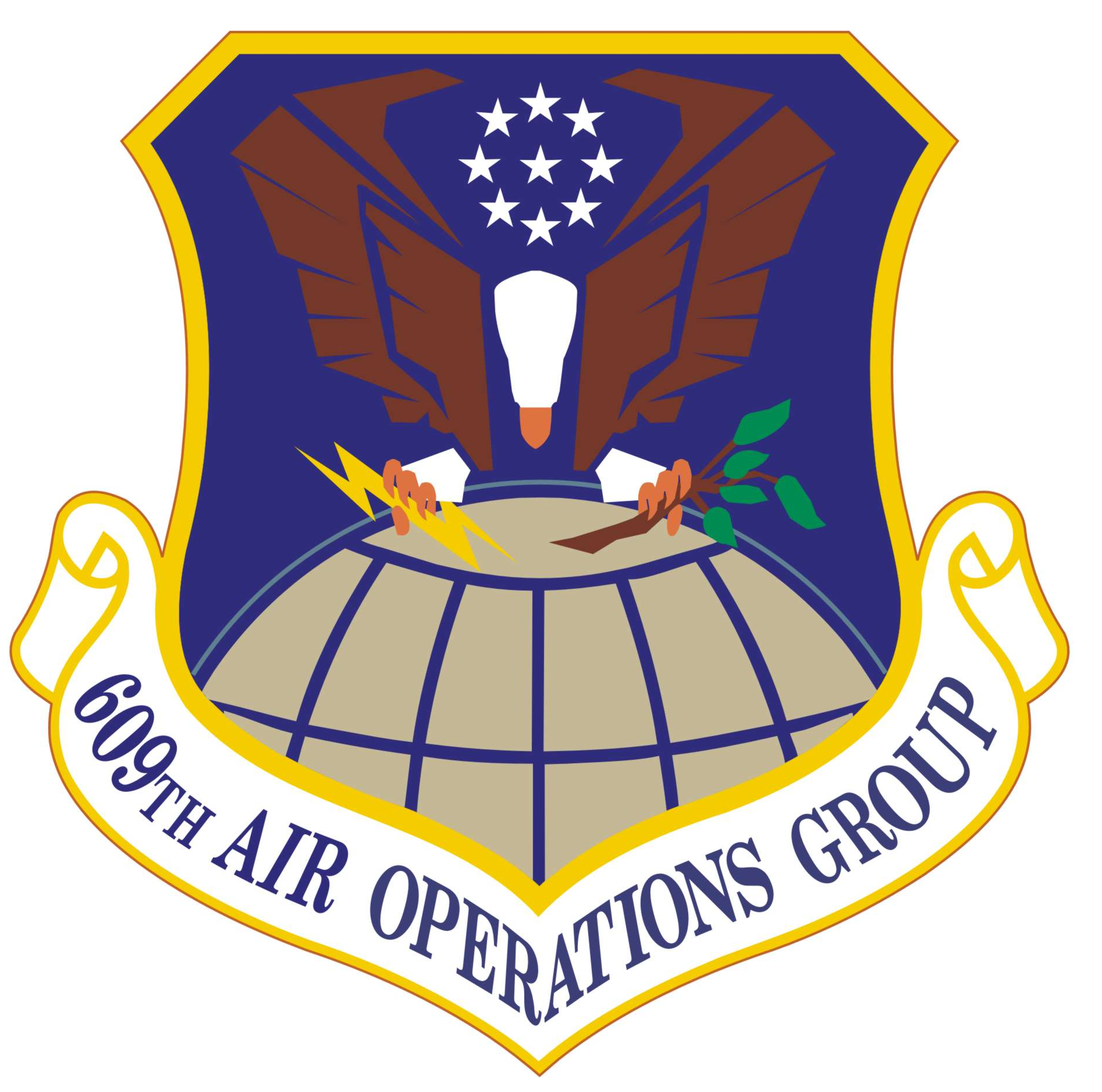
- 609th Air Operations Group emblem

The 609th Air Operations Center (609 AOC) is an active unit of the United States Air Force based at Al Udeid Air Base, Qatar. The unit is responsible for the daily execution of the air tasking order (ATO) on behalf of the Combined Forces Air Component Commander (CFACC) in the United States Central Command area of responsibility. The unit's personnel work with partners from 18 other nations to complete their mission.

When the United States and Israel launched the 2026 Iran War, among the allied and partner liaison officers in the CAOC were the Canadian Forces. "Canada has members of three branches of the military — army, navy and air force —attached to CENTCOM and "we specifically have staff officers inside what's known as the Combined Aerospace Operations Center ... so, they are going to be directly involved in targeting."

== Lineage ==
- Established as the 609th Air Operations Group and activated on 1 January 1994

Redesignated 609th Air and Space Operations Center on 1 March 2008
Redesignated 609th Air Operations Center on 1 December 2014

=== Assignments ===
- Ninth Air Force (later, Ninth Air Force (Air Forces Central), United States Air Forces Central Command, Ninth Air Force (Air Forces Central)), 1 January 1994 – present

=== Components ===
- 609th Air Support Squadron: 17 September 2019 – present

=== Stations ===
- Shaw Air Force Base, South Carolina, 1 January 1994
- Al Udeid Air Base, Qatar, 1 March 2008 – present
