= Daniel Tulley =

U.S. Air Force general

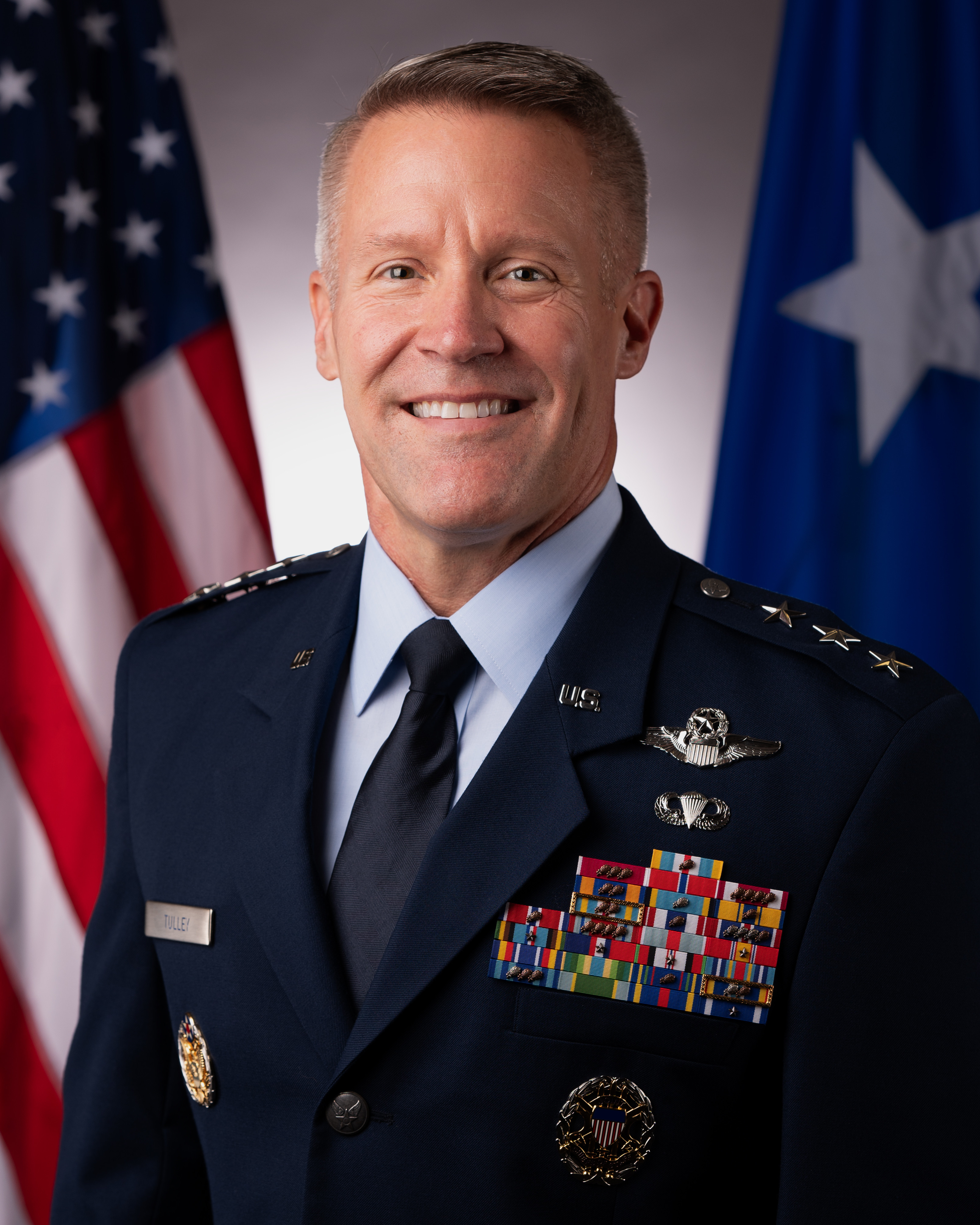
- Official portrait, 2026
- Military career
- Allegiance: United States
- Branch: United States Air Force
- Service years: 1992–present
- Rank: Lieutenant General
- Commands: Air Mobility Command; Air University; 379th Air Expeditionary Wing; 6th Air Mobility Wing; 43rd Airlift Group; 41st Airlift Squadron
- Conflicts: War in Afghanistan
- Awards: Defense Superior Service Medal; Legion of Merit (2); Bronze Star Medal

Daniel H. Tulley is a United States Air Force lieutenant general who has served as the Commander of Air Mobility Command since August 3, 2026. He previously served as the commander and president of Air University and the director of operations at the United States Transportation Command.

== Military career ==
Tulley served as the commander of the 379th Air Expeditionary Wing and was the senior military assistant to the Secretary of the Air Force. In February 2021, he was nominated for promotion to major general.

Military offices
| Preceded by Scott V. DeThomas | Commander of the 6th Air Mobility Wing; 2014–2016 | Succeeded by April D. Vogel |
| Preceded by David R. Iverson | Senior Military Assistant to the United States Secretary of the Air Force; 2018–2019 | Succeeded by Leslie A. Maher |
| Preceded by Jason Armagost | Commander of the 379th Air Expeditionary Wing; 2019–2021 | Succeeded by Gerald A. Donohue |
| Preceded by David R. Iverson | Vice Director for Joint Force Development of the Joint Staff; 2021–2023 | Succeeded by Patrick L. Gaydon |
| Preceded by Laura Lenderman | Director of Operations of the United States Transportation Command; 2024–2025 | Succeeded by Corey A. Simmons |
| Preceded by Andrea Tullos | Commander and President of Air University; 2025–2026 | Ret. Maj. Gen. Charles S. Corcoran (TBA) |
