= 492nd Fighter Squadron =

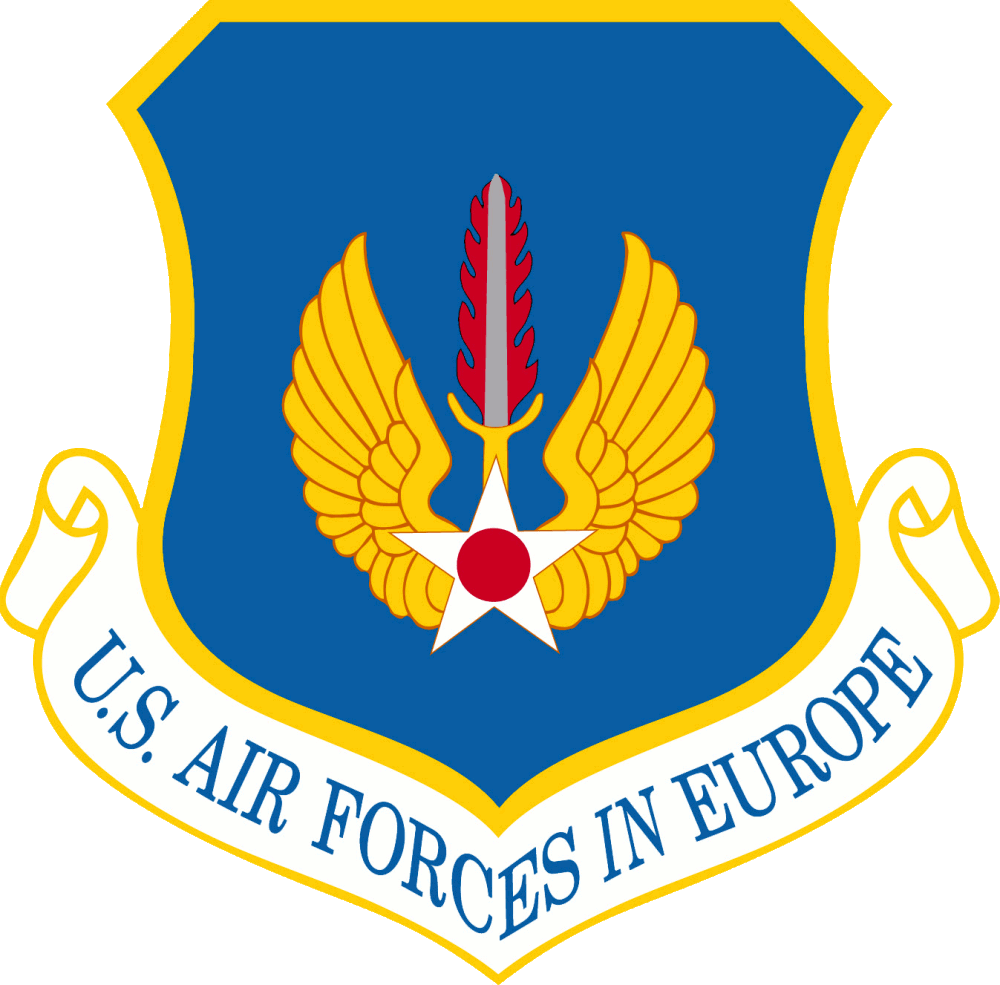
492nd Fighter Squadron

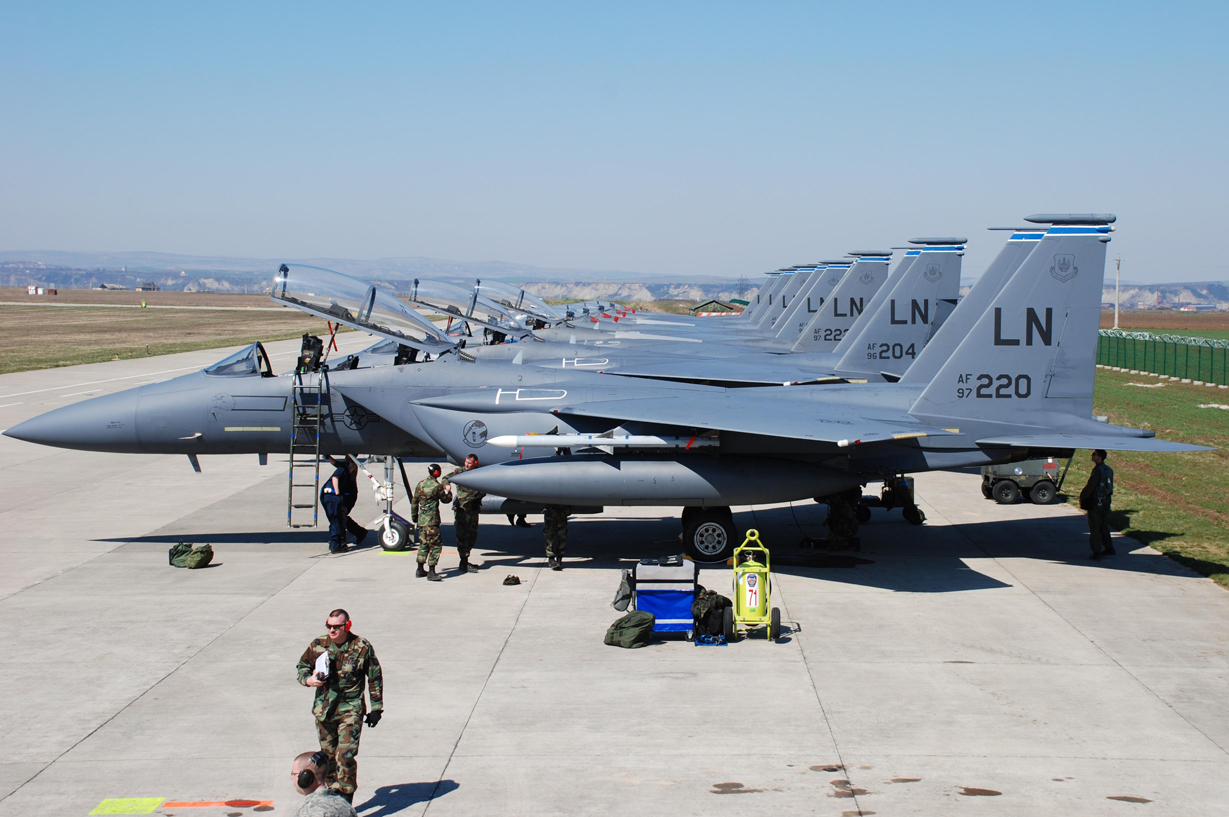
- Squadron F-15E Strike Eagles on deployment in Romania, 2008
- Active: 1941–1945; 1952−present
- Country: United States
- Branch: United States Air Force
- Role: Fighter
- Part of: United States Air Forces in Europe
- Garrison/HQ: RAF Lakenheath
- Nicknames: Bolars, Madhatters
- Colors: Blue
- Engagements: European Theater of Operations
- Decorations: Distinguished Unit Citation; Air Force Outstanding Unit Award; Navy Meritorious Unit Commendation; Belgian Fourragere

Commanders
- Notable commanders: Lt. Gen. Steven L. Kwast; Lt. Gen. Jay B. Silveria; Maj. Gen. David Iverson; Brig. Gen. Christopher M. Short

Insignia
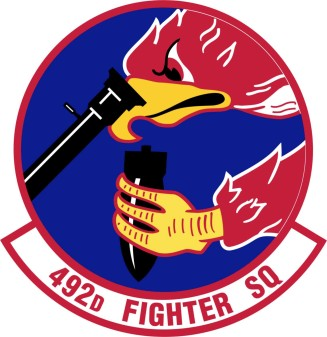
- 492nd Fighter Squadron emblem (Note: Approved 25 February 1943, restored 11 February 2005. Description: On a light blue disc with a border of alternate bands of yellow, white, red, and white, the head and leg of a kestrel (Cerchneis tinnunculus) dark red, trimmed white, beak and feet orange, peering thru a black bomb sight and grasping a black aerial bomb, point to base. When the emblem was restored, the border was simplified and the direction the kestrel was facing was reversed.)

- 1990s 492nd Fighter Squadron emblem (Note: 492nd Tactical Fighter Squadron emblem modified 1993.)

- Patch with 492nd Tactical Fighter Squadron emblem (Note: Approved 9 June 1964. Description On a Blue disc edged Red a flight symbol descending bendwise, tricolored Yellow with Red to dexter and Black to sinister surmounted by a kestrel head erased descending bendwise Red detailed White, eye and beak Yellow, all above a yellow dexter arm grasping in its hand [a] Yellow torch flamed proper.)
- Tail code (Note: Since July 1972.): LN
- World War II fuselage code: F4

Aircraft flown
- Fighter: F-15E Strike Eagle

The 492nd Fighter Squadron is part of the 48th Fighter Wing at RAF Lakenheath, England, where they operate the McDonnell Douglas F-15E Strike Eagle. The squadron was originally activated as the 55th Bombardment Squadron in 1941, as the United States Army Air Corps built up prior to the entry of the United States into World War II. Following the attack on Pearl Harbor, it briefly engaged in the antisubmarine campaign before becoming a Replacement Training Unit. In 1943, it became the 492nd Fighter-Bomber Squadron and trained for overseas deployment. The squadron moved to England and engaged in combat until V-E day, earning two Distinguished Unit Citations and the Belgian Fourragere for its actions. It returned to the United States, where it was inactivated in November 1945.

The squadron was reactivated in France in July 1952, when it assumed the personnel and equipment of an Air National Guard squadron that had been mobilized for the Korean War. It moved to England in 1960, and has participated in Operation El Dorado Canyon and Desert Storm. It has deployed aircraft and personnel to support operations in Southwest Asia and Afghanistan, including deployments in which it made up all, or nearly all, of the 492nd Expeditionary Fighter Squadron.

== Mission ==
The 492nd Fighter Squadron is a combat-ready McDonnell Douglas F-15E Strike Eagle squadron that can execute strategic attack, interdiction, and counter air missions in support of United States Air Forces in Europe, United States European Command, and North Atlantic Treaty Organization (NATO) operations. It can use all of the USAF's air-superiority and surface-attack munitions. The squadron can deploy to any theater of operations in the world.

== History ==
=== World War II ===
==== Organization and training in the United States ====
A-20 Havoc, first plane to equip the squadron

The unit was first activated Hunter Field, Georgia in January 1941 as the 55th Bombardment Squadron, one of the four original squadrons assigned to the 48th Bombardment Group and equipped with Douglas A-20 Havoc bombers. The squadron trained for operation as a light bomber unit. Following the attack on Pearl Harbor, the squadron briefly flew antisubmarine patrols, from March to April 1942.

In June 1942, the squadron moved to Key Field, Mississippi, where it replaced its Havocs with Vultee A-35 Vengeances and became a Replacement Training Unit (RTU). RTUs were oversized units which trained aircrews prior to their deployment to combat theaters. In August 1943, along with other Army Air Forces single-engine light and dive bomber units, the squadron became a fighter-bomber unit as the 492nd Fighter-Bomber Squadron.

Five days after this redesignation, the squadron ended its RTU mission at Key Field and moved to William Northern Field, Tennessee, and re-equipped with Bell P-39 Airacobras and Curtiss P-40 Warhawks. It began to prepare for combat, moving to Walterboro Army Air Field, South Carolina in January 1944, where it received Republic P-47 Thunderbolts, the type it would fly in combat. It departed for Camp Shanks, the Port of Embarkation, on 13 March 1944 for transport to the European Theater of Operations on board the RMS Queen Mary.

==== Combat in the European Theater ====
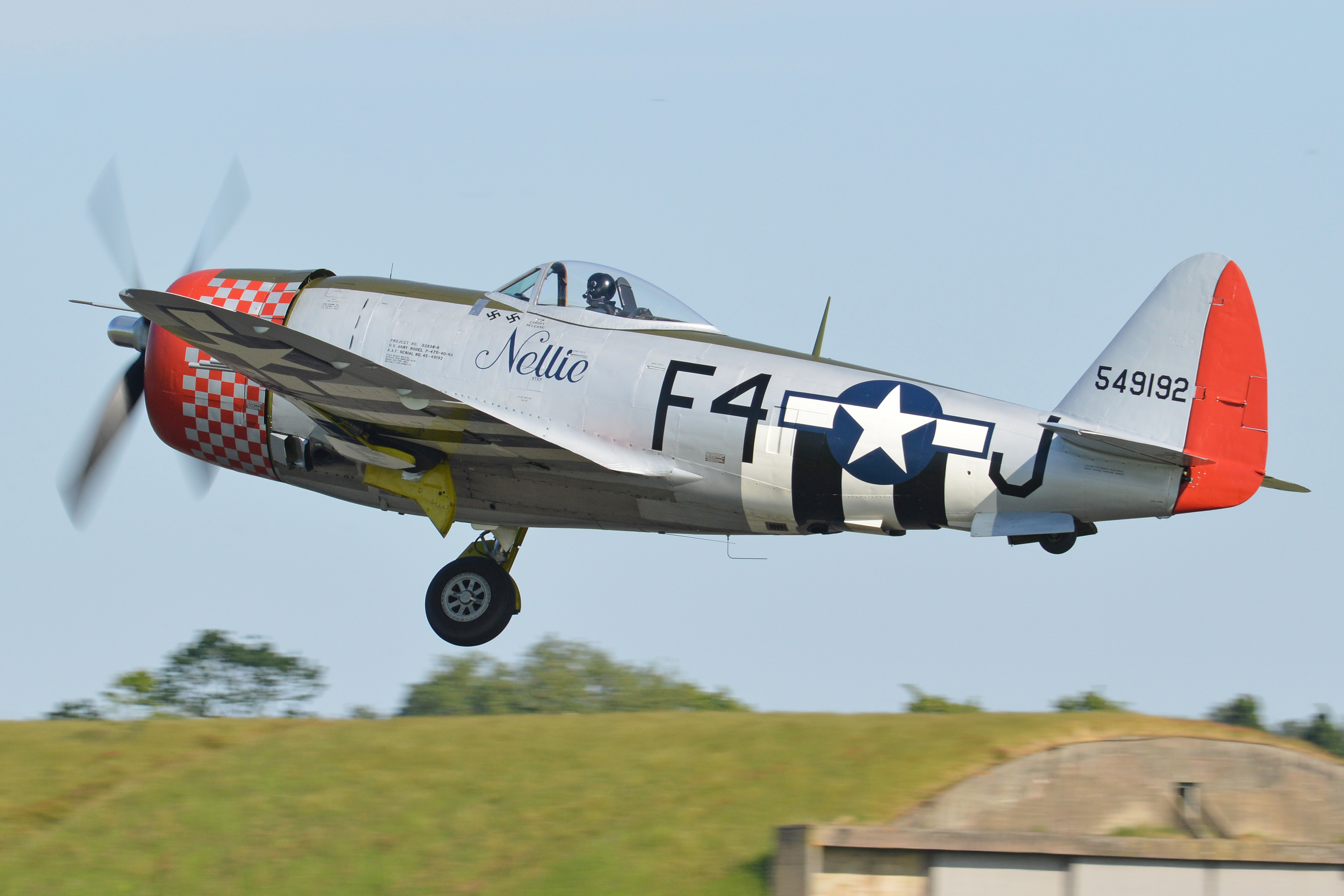
A Republic P-47D Thunderbolt in 492nd Fighter Squadron markings.

The squadron arrived at its first combat base, RAF Ibsley, England on 29 March 1944. It flew its first combat mission on 20 April 1944, a fighter sweep of the occupied French coast. On 30 May 1944, the unit became the 492nd Fighter Squadron.

The 492nd took part in Operation Overlord, the invasion of Normandy On D-Day, it bombed bridges and gun positions. As the Normandy campaign advanced, it attacked rail lines and trains, motor transport, bridges, fuel dumps and gun positions and performed visual reconnaissance. On 18 June 1944, the 492nd moved to France to Deux Jumeaux Airfield, an advanced landing ground. From there, the squadron supported Operation Cobra, the breakout at Saint Lo, in July.

The squadron supported Allied forces in their drive across northern France, primarily the United States First Army. In August and September, it flew missions for Operation Market Garden airborne attacks on Rhine river crossings in the Netherlands. It was cited by the Belgian Army for its close cooperation with allied forces from 6 June to 30 September. After it moved to Sint-Truiden Airfield, Belgium in September, it was cited a second time for its operations in the fall and winter of 1944-1945, resulting in the award of the Belgian Fourragere to the squadron. It was cited by the Belgian Army a third time for its participation in the Battle of the Bulge.

On 6 December 1944, the squadron faced heavy enemy fire while flying beneath a heavy overcast to attack buildings, entrenchments and troop concentrations to assist the advance of ground troops against an enemy stronghold north of Julich, Germany. For this action it was awarded a Distinguished Unit Citation. The squadron supported ground troops during the Battle of the Bulge, continuing support through the end of the war in Europe. Its missions included bomber escort missions, weather reconnaissance, and leaflet flights. On one occasion, it carried blood plasma in belly tanks, dropping the tanks to ground troops.

In March 1945, the squadron supported the 9th Armored Division in defending the bridgehead the division had established after crossing the only intact bridge across the Rhine at Remagen. The squadron flew its last mission of the war from on 8 May 1945 from Illesheim Airfield, Germany.

In August 1945, the unit returned to the United States, with many members seprating at the Port of Embarkation. The remaining squadron members reassembled at Seymour Johnson Field, North Carolina, where the squadron was inactivated on 7 November 1945.

=== Cold War ===
==== Reactivation in France ====
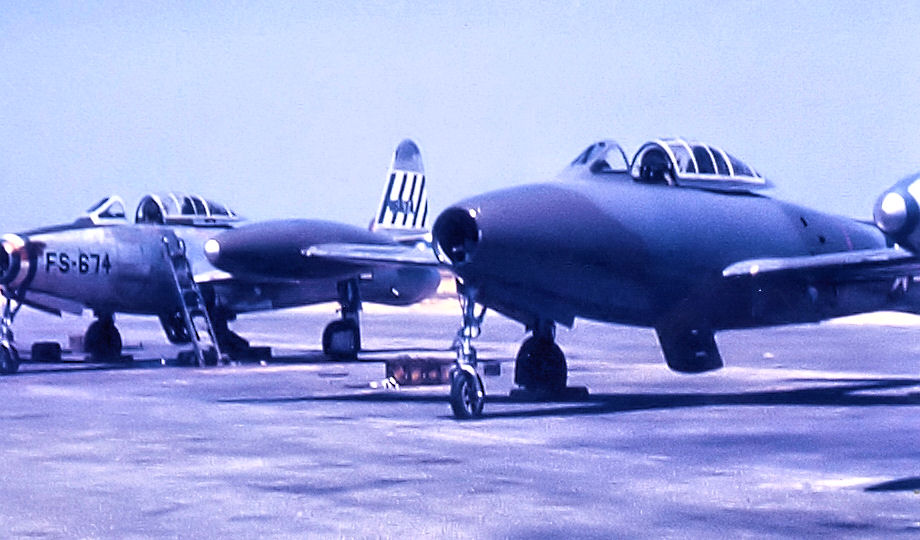
Squadron F-84 Thunderjets in 1954 (Note: The aircraft in the foreground has an experimental camouflage. The other is Republic F-84G-2-RE Thunderjet, serial 51-9674.)

The unit was again designated the 492nd Fighter-Bomber Squadron and activated at Chaumont Air Base, France, on 10 July 1952, when it took over the mission, personnel and Republic F-84G Thunderjets of the 125th Fighter-Bomber Squadron, an Air National Guard squadron that had been called to active duty for the Korean War, which was being returned to the control of the State of Oklahoma. The squadron rotated pilots on temporary duty to Far East Air Forces (FEAF), where they gained combat experience with FEAF's F-84 units. In November 1953, the squadron began to switch to North American F-86F Sabres, as the 48th Wing became the first United States Air Forces Europe (USAFE) Sabre wing. It began to transfer its F-84s to the 36th Fighter-Bomber Wing at Bitburg Air Base, Germany, with some going to the Danish Air Force under the Mutual Defense Assistance Program (MDAP). The 48th Wing was also tasked to train pilots of European nations receiving F-84s under MDAP. The last of the Thunderjets left in 1954.

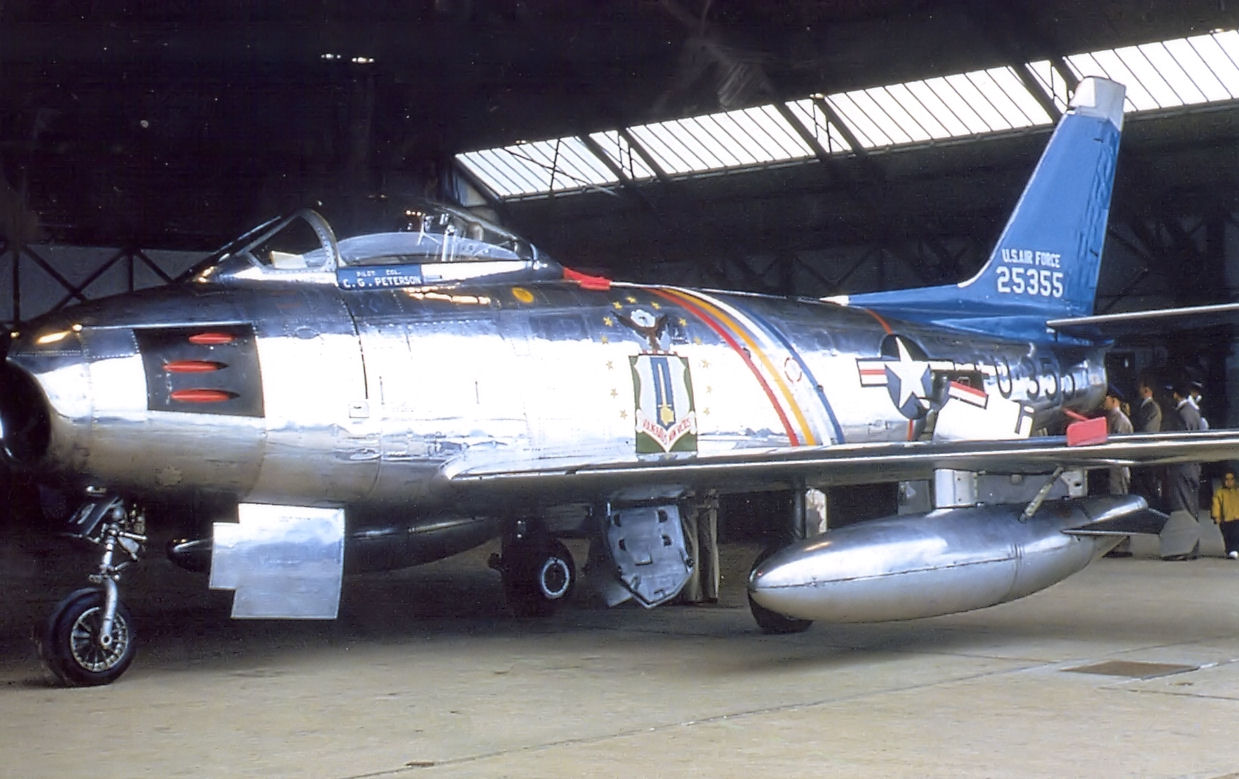
Squadron F-86F Sabre in 1956 (Note: Aircraft is North American F-86F-25-NH Sabre, serial 52-5355, marked as the 48 Wing commander's aircraft.)

In 1955, the squadron began training for delivery of the Mark 7 nuclear bomb at Wheelus Air Base, Lybia during their gunnery and weapons delivery deployments there. In September, the squadron began deployments to Furstenfeldbruck Air Base, Germany, where it stood Zulu (nuclear) Alert. In February 1956, the location of the Zulu Alert changed to Sembach Air Base, Germany, as Furstenfeldbruck was transferred to the German Air Force and the squadron's alert aircraft began using the lighter Mark 12 nuclear bomb for some of its alert aircraft.

Starting in September 1956, the squadron began upgrading to the North American F-100D Super Sabre, as the 48th Wing became the first wing in USAFE to fly the Super Sabre. Because of the more favorable winter weather there, upgrade training was conducted at bases in Morococo. Because the F-100s could not operate from Sembach, the squadron's Zulu Alert base changed to Hahn Air Base, with F-100s replacing the alert F-86s in January 1957. In December 1957, the 48th Wing converted to the dual deputy organization. (Note: Under this plan flying squadrons reported to the wing Deputy Commander for Operations.) The 48th Group was inactivated and the squadron was assigned directy to the 48th Fighter Bomber Wing. The squadron was redesignated the 492nd Tactical Fighter Squadron on 8 July 1958. During 1958, the squadron's Zulu Alert planes began to be armed with Mark 28 nuclear bombs, which could be carried on a centerline pylon permitting the planes to carry additional fuel to extend their range.

However, due to French concerns about atomic storage and custody issues, a decision was made resulting in the removal of USAF atomic-capable units from French soil in Project Red Richard. On 15 January 1960, the 48th Wing moved to RAF Lakenheath, England.

==== Move to England ====
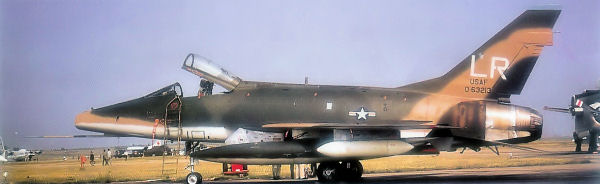
Squadron F-100D Super Sabre in Southeast Asia camouflage (Note: Aircraft is North American F-100D-90-NA Super Sabre, serial 56-3213. Note the LR tailcode. This aircraft was transferred to the Military Aircraft Storage and Disposal Center on 21 March 1977. It was converted to a QF-100 drone and shot down on 5 May 1987. Dirkx, Marco (23 September 2025). "1956 USAF Serial Numbers". Joe Baugher’s Serial Number List..)

The squadron's F-100 fleet trained with USAFE and NATO to react to aggression from the Soviet Union. It conducted deployments to Turkey, Italy, Spain, and across the United Kingdom. It continued training deployments to Wheelus until 1969, when Muammar Gaddafi, who had recently taken power, asked the United States to leave the country.

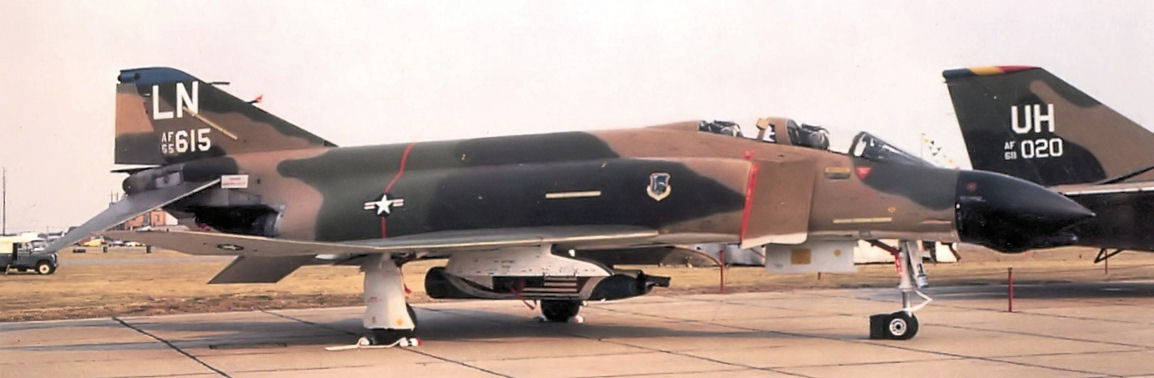
Squadron F-4D Phantom II in 1976 (Note: Aircraft is McDonnell Douglas F-4D-27-MC Phantom II, serial 65-0615. This plane was transferred to the Aerospace Maintenance and Regeneration Center on 12 June 1987 and scrapped on 1 September 1996. Dirkx, Marco (18 August 2025). "1965 USAF Serial Numbers". Joe Baugher’s Serial Number List..)

On 1 October 1971, the squadron stood down from its NATO obligations to convert to the McDonnell Douglas F-4D Phantom II. The conversion to the F-4D was slow and it was not until July 1974 that the unit reached its full complement of Phantoms, and the squadron did not become operational with the new fighter until December, even though it was the first 48th Wing squadron to meet that goal. It continued deploy to stand nuclear alert with the Phantom.

=== F-111s and Operation El Dorado Canyon ===
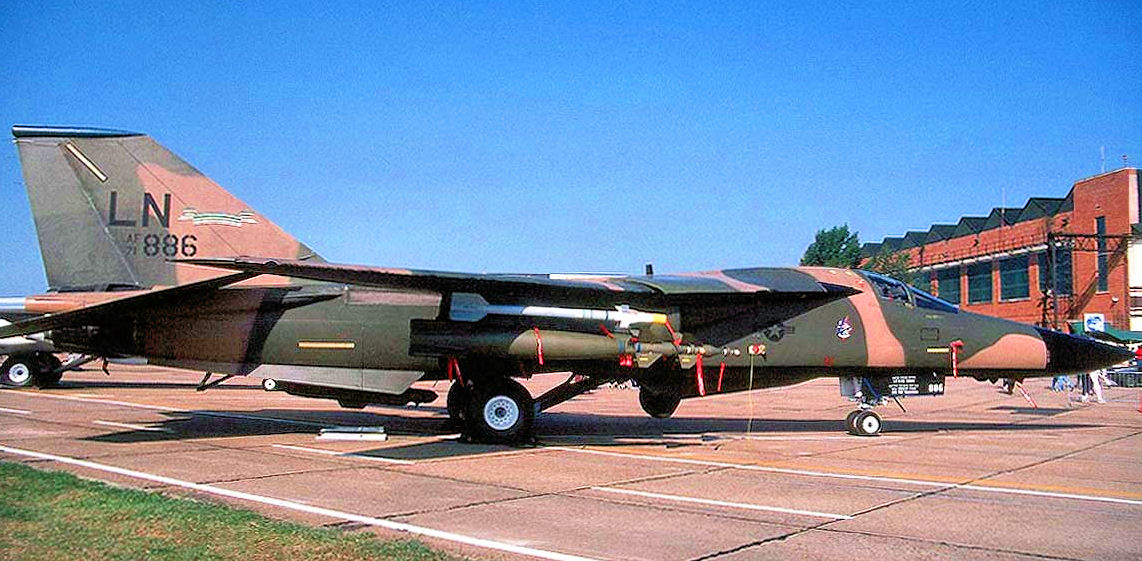
Squadron F-111F Aardvark in 1990 (Note: Aircraft is General Dynamics F-111F, serial 71-0886. The ribbon on its tail is for taking part in Operation El Dorado Canyon during April 1986. This plane was transferred to the Aerospace Maintenance and Regeneration Center on 22 July 1996 and scrapped on 1 June 2010. Dirkx, Marco (23 September 2025). "1971 USAF Serial Numbers". Joe Baugher’s Serial Number List.)

The Phantom's service with squadron was short. The squadron received General Dynamics F-111F Aardvarks from the 366th Tactical Fighter Wing at Mountain Home Air Force Base as the 366th Wing converted to F-111As in early 1977. Unlike the switch to F-4s, the F-111 change took place quickly and with no significant problems, earning the wing an Air Force Outstanding Unit Award. Almost immediately after changing aircraft, the squadron began a series of monthly exercises and deployments that took the squadron to Italy, Iran, Greece, and Pakistan.

On night of 14/15 April 1986, the 492nd and the rest of the 48th Wing participated with Navy air units in Operation El Dorado Canyon, the air raid on Tripoli, Libya, as a response to the West Berlin discotheque bombing. The squadron received a Navy Meritorious Unit Commendation for its performance in this operation.

The 492nd deployed their F-111Fs to Taif Air Base, Saudi Arabia, as part of Operation Desert Shield, in response to Saddam Hussein's invasion of Kuwait. At Taif, the fighters became part of the Tactical Fighter Wing, Provisional, 48th. The unit launched strikes on Iraq as part of Operation Desert Storm between in January and February 1991. The provisional wing was credited with the destruction of 920 armored vehiclas well as aircraft shelters, bunkers and bridges, while suffering no losses. In one of the last missions of the war, on 27 February, the unit recorded the first combat use of a laser guided GBU-28, destroying an Iraqi command and control center. After returning to Lakenheath, the 48th reorganized under the Objective Wing model, and the squadron was renamed the 492nd Fighter Squadron and again assigned to the 48th Group, now named the 48th Operations Group.

=== F-15 Strike Eagle operations ===
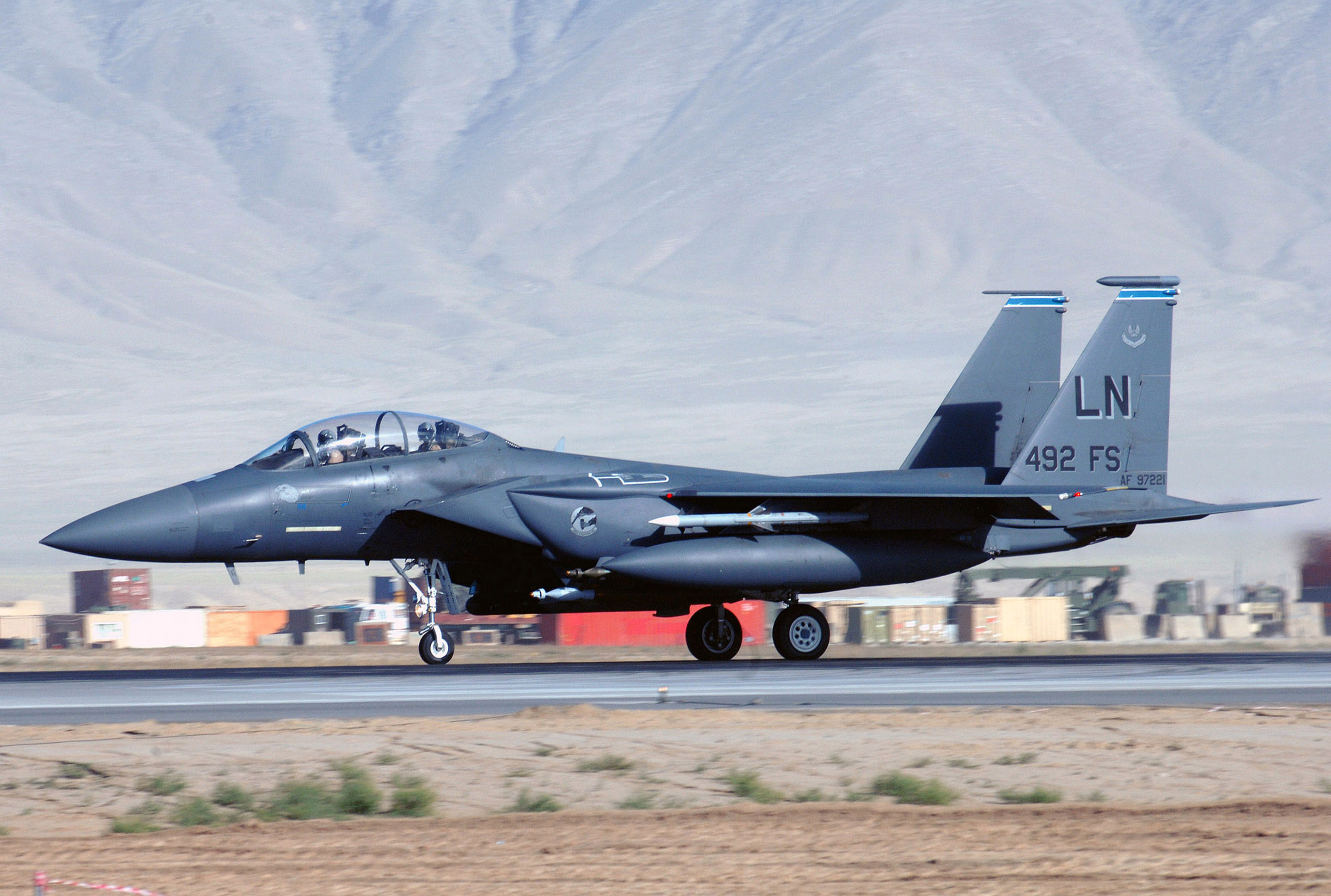
492nd Expeditionary Fighter Squadron F-15E Strike Eagle taking off from Bagram Airfield, Afghanistan in 2007 (Note: Aircraft is McDonnell Douglas F-15E-61-MC Strike Eagle, serial 97-0221, Goalie. Dirkx, Marco (22 September 2025). "1997 USAF Serial Numbers". Joe Baugher’s Serial Number List.)

The 492nd switched aircraft again, exchanging the F-111Fs for the McDonnell Douglas F-15E Strike Eagle in February 1992. The last F-111 departed Lakenheath in December and conversion to the F-15 was complete by June 1993. The squadron made the 48th Wing's first deployment with the Strike Eagle in August 1993, when elements operated from Incirlik Air Base, Turkey in Operation Northern Watch and Operation Provide Comfort. During the 1990s, the squadron rotated to Turkey and to Aviano Air Base, Italy, flying missions in Operation Deny Flight. In 1999, The 492nd Expeditionary Fighter Squadron flew missions for Operation Noble Anvil in response to Serbian aggression against Kosovo. Some 492nd missions were flown directly from Lakenheath.

In 2000, the squadron deployed forces to Ahmad al-Jaber Air Base, Kuwait for Operation Southern Watch, enforcement of the no-fly zone in southern Iraq. Following the September 11 attacks, the squadron provided top cover for Boeing C-17 Globemaster IIIs transporting humanitarian rations to refugees in Afghanistan.

Between 23 March and 10 April 2008, the squadron was assigned to the 404th Air Expeditionary Group of the 323d Air Expeditionary Wing and deployed F-15 fighters to the Câmpia Turzii Air Base, Romania in support of Operation Noble Endeavor. The squadron flew on air policing missions with the Romanian Air Force for the 2008 Bucharest summit. During the three-day summit, the 492nd flew three air patrols over Bucharest in addition to the alerts, and further protected President George W. Bush during his trip to Croatia.

The squadron participated in Operation Odyssey Dawn in Libya in March 2011, along with numerous deployments to Southwest Asia supporting air expeditionary units as part of the ongoing Global War on Terrorism as part of Operation Iraqi Freedom and Operation Enduring Freedom. It participated in a short deployment to Incirlik Air Base, Turkey in November 2015 in support of Operation Inherent Resolve. Accompanied by 493d Fighter Squadron, the F-15s were sent to enforce the sovereign air space of Turkey.

The squadron deployed once again in April 2017 for six months as the 492nd Expeditionary Fighter Squadron, relieving the 389th Expeditionary Fighter Squadron. On 8 June, the squadron shot down a pro-Syrian Regime Shahed 129 unmanned aerial vehicle after it had fired upon friendly forces. Another Shahed 129 was shot down on 20 June after it began advancing on coalition forces. The 492nd was replaced by the Seymour Johnson Air Force Base based 336th Expeditionary Fighter Squadron in October 2017. Over the course of the deployment, the 492nd flew over 2,000 missions, delivered over 4,000 precision munitions across 11,000 combat flying hours and achieved two air-to-air kills against enemy aircraft. Because of the squadron's extreme combat effectiveness and achievement of total air dominance in the area of operations, they were awarded the Raytheon Trophy, a first for any Strike Eagle squadron and multi-role aircraft.

In May 2019, the 492nd provided dissimilar air combat training for the General Dynamics F-16C Fighting Falcon of the 93rd Fighter Squadron, who had deployed from Homestead Air Reserve Base, Florida to Lakenheath.

Between July and August 2019, the squadron deployed to the U.S. with 14 F-15Es, initially to participate in Exercise Red Flag 19–3 at Nellis AFB, before spending two weeks at Mountain Home Air Force Base alongside the 366th Fighter Wing for Weapon System Evaluation Program Exercises Combat Hammer and Combat Archer.

At least one of the three F-15E Strike Eagles which were shot down in a supposed friendly fire incident by a Kuwaiti Air Force McDonnell Douglas F/A-18 Hornet on 2 March 2026 during the Iran War was operated by the 492nd.

== The Madhatters/Bolars nickname ==
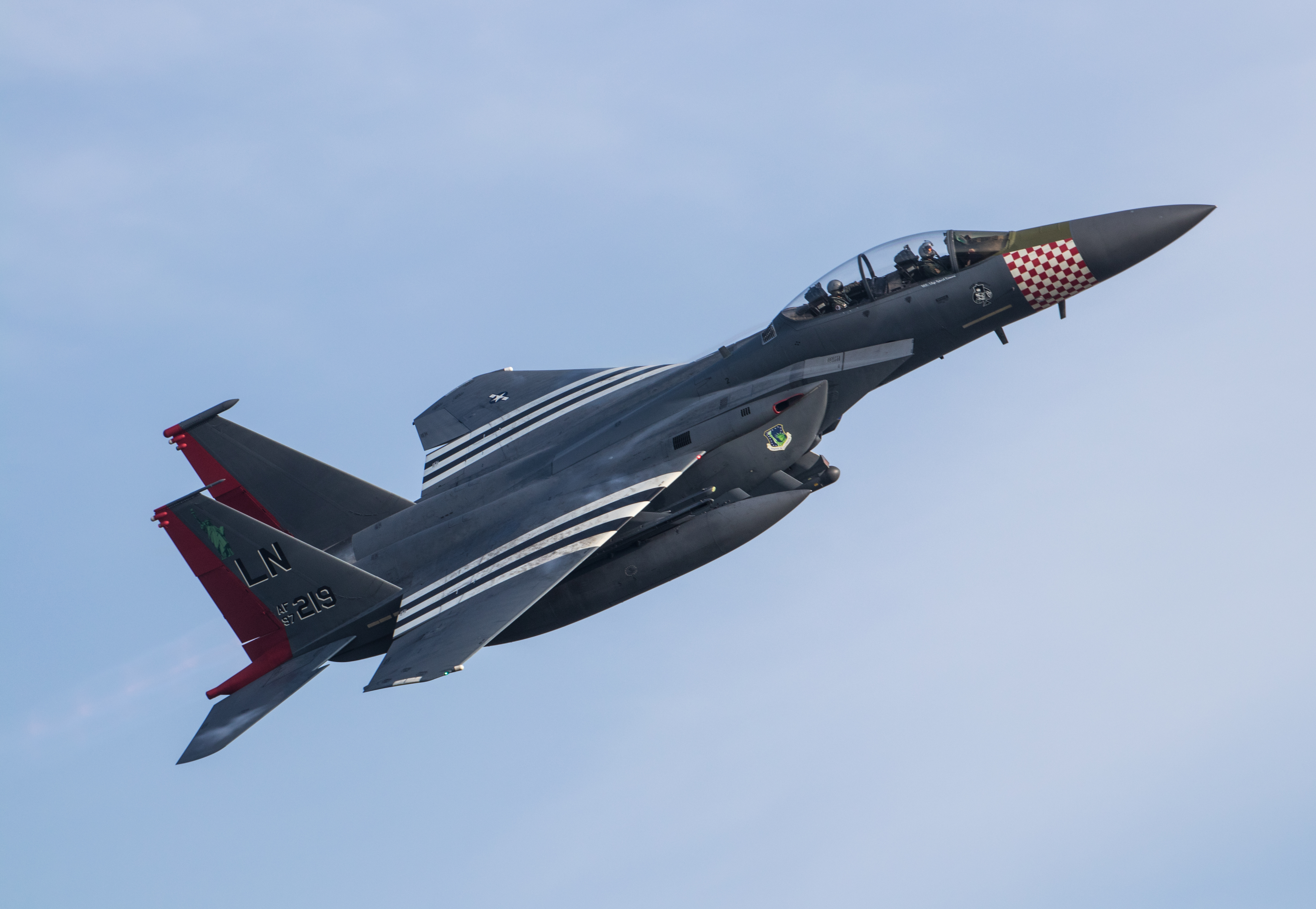
An F-15E of the squadron in D-Day anniversary markings featuring the Madhatters emblem

While stationed at Chaumont Air Base, France, the Madhatters were seen wearing berets. When they moved to England, the squadron adopted the bowler hat, a traditional English hat with a rounded crown. The tradition of wearing the bowler hat has continued to present day although it is not an official uniform. Due to the limit of five characters for a flight callsign, the squadron uses "Bolar" instead of bowler when conducting local flying. The practice of adopting headgear of the various geographic regions where the 492nd Fighter Squadron is sent to continues. In Turkey, each deployed Madhatter wears a blue fez.

== Lineage ==
- Constituted as the 55th Bombardment Squadron (Light) on 20 November 1940

Activated on 15 January 1941
Redesignated 55th Bombardment Squadron (Dive) on 28 August 1942
Redesignated 492nd Fighter-Bomber Squadron on 10 August 1943
Redesignated 492nd Fighter Squadron, Single Engine on 30 May 1944
Inactivated on 7 November 1945
Redesignated 492nd Fighter-Bomber Squadron on 25 June 1952
Activated on 10 July 1952
Redesignated 492nd Tactical Fighter Squadron on 8 July 1958
Redesignated 492nd Fighter Squadron on 1 October 1991

=== Assignments ===
- 48th Bombardment Group (later 48th Fighter-Bomber Group, 48th Fighter Group), 15 January 1941 – 7 November 1945
- 48th Fighter-Bomber Group, 10 July 1952
- 48th Fighter-Bomber Wing (later 48th Tactical Fighter Wing, 48 Fighter Wing), 8 December 1957 (attached to 48th Fighter Wing [Provisional] 2 September 1990 – 15 March 1991, 7440th Composite Wing, September–December 1991)
- 48th Operations Group, 31 March 1992 – present

=== Stations ===
- Hunter Field, Georgia, 15 January 1941
- Will Rogers Field, Oklahoma, 23 May 1941
- Hunter Field, Georgia, 7 February 1942
- Key Field, Mississippi, 28 June 1942
- William Northern Field, Tennessee, 20 August 1943
- Walterboro Army Air Field, South Carolina, 27 January – 13 March 1944
- RAF Ibsley (AAF-347), England, 29 March 1944
- Deux Jumeaux Airfield (A-4), France, 18 June 1944
- Villacoublay Airfield (A-42), France, 29 August 1944
- Cambrai/Niergnies Airfield (A-74), France, 15 September 1944
- Sint-Truiden Airfield (A-92), Belgium, 30 September 1944
- Kelz Airfield (Y-54), Germany, 26 March 1945
- Kassel-Rothwesten Airfield (R-12), Germany, 18 April 1945
- Illesheim Airfield (R-10), Germany, 25 April 1945
- Laon, France, 5 July – August 1945
- Seymour Johnson Field, North Carolina, 9 September – 7 November 1945
- Chaumont Air Base, France, 10 July 1952
- RAF Lakenheath, England, 11 January 1960 – present (deployed to Ta’if, Saudi Arabia 2 September 1990 – 15 March 1991, Incirlik Air Base, Turkey, September–December 1991)

=== Aircraft ===
- Curtiss A-18 Shrike (1941)
- Douglas A-20 Havoc (1941–1942)
- Vultee A-35 Vengeance (1942–1943)
- Curtiss P-40 Warhawk (1943)
- Bell P-39 Airacobra (1943–1944)
- Republic P-47 Thunderbolt (1944–1945)
- Republic F-84G Thunderjet (1952–1954)
- North American F-86F Sabre (1953–1956)
- North American F-100D Super Sabre (1956–1972)
- McDonnell Douglas F-4D Phantom II (1972–1977)
- General Dynamics F-111F Aardvark (1977–1992)
- McDonnell Douglas F-15E Strike Eagle (1992–present)

=== Awards and campaigns ===
Award streamer	Award	Dates	Notes
	Distinguished Unit Citation	15 October 1944	European Theater of Operations; 492nd Fighter Squadron
	Distinguished Unit Citation	5 December 1944	Germany, 492nd Fighter Squadron
	Air Force Meritorious Unit Award	1 June 2005–31 May 2006	492nd Expeditionary Fighter Squadron (Note: Expeditionary units are deemed separate units by the Air Force. When a regular unit is the major force provider for an expeditionary unit, the expeditionary unit takes its name from the major force provider, which is entitled to any honors earned by the expeditionary unit. AF Instruction 38-101, Manpower and Organization, 29 August 2019, para. 31.4.)
	Air Force Meritorious Unit Award	1 October 2006–30 September 2006	492nd Expeditionary Fighter Squadron
	Air Force Meritorious Unit Award	7 November 2011–19 June 2012	492nd Expeditionary Fighter Squadron
	Air Force Meritorious Unit Award	7 April 2017–17 June 2017	492nd Expeditionary Fighter Squadron
	Air Force Meritorious Unit Award	1 May 2020–1 October 2020	492nd Expeditionary Fighter Squadron
	Air Force Outstanding Unit Award	1 July 1961–29 February 1964	492nd Tactical Fighter Squadron
	Air Force Outstanding Unit Award	14 October 1976–31 December 1977	492nd Tactical Fighter Squadron
	Air Force Outstanding Unit Award	1 April 1978–31 March 1980	492nd Tactical Fighter Squadron
	Air Force Outstanding Unit Award	1 July 1984–30 June 1986	492nd Tactical Fighter Squadron
	Air Force Outstanding Unit Award	1 July 1986–30 June 1988	492nd Tactical Fighter Squadron
	Air Force Outstanding Unit Award	1 July 1988–30 June 1990	492nd Tactical Fighter Squadron
	Air Force Outstanding Unit Award	20 Aug 1990–11 May 1991	492nd Fighter Tactical Squadron
	Air Force Outstanding Unit Award	1 July 1992–30 June 1994	492nd Fighter Squadron
	Air Force Outstanding Unit Award	21 April 1999–10 June 1999	492nd Expeditionary Fighter Squadron
	Air Force Outstanding Unit Award	1 October 2000–24 September 2002	492nd Fighter Squadron
	Air Force Outstanding Unit Award	1 October 2002–30 September 2004	492nd Fighter Squadron
	Air Force Outstanding Unit Award	1 October 2004–31 October 2005	492nd Fighter Squadron
	Air Force Outstanding Unit Award	1 November 2005–31 December 2006	492nd Fighter Squadron
	Air Force Outstanding Unit Award	1 January 2007–31 December 2007	492nd Fighter Squadron
	Air Force Outstanding Unit Award	1 January 2009–31 December 2010	492nd Fighter Squadron
	Air Force Outstanding Unit Award	1 January 2014–28 February 2015	492nd Fighter Squadron
	Air Force Outstanding Unit Award	1 January 2014–28 February 2015	492nd Fighter Squadron
	Air Force Outstanding Unit Award	1 March 2015–29 February 2016	492nd Fighter Squadron
	Air Force Outstanding Unit Award	16 August 2021–18 October 2021	492nd Fighter Squadron
	Navy Meritorious Unit Commendation	10 April 1986–16 April 1986	Libya, 492nd Tactical Fighter Squadron
	Belgian Fourragere	6 June 1944–15 January 1945 (Note: Cited in the Orders of the Day, Belgian Army: 6 June–30 September 1944, 1 October–17 December 1944 and 18 December 1944–15 January 1945.)	492nd Fighter Squadron

Campaign Streamer	Campaign	Dates	Notes
	Antisubmarine	March 1942–April 1942	55th Bombardment Squadron
	Air Offensive, Europe	29 March 1944 – 5 June 1944	492nd Fighter-Bomber Squadron (later 492nd Fighter Sqadron)
	Air Combat, EAME Theater	29 March 1944 – 11 May 1945	492nd Fighter-Bomber Squadron (later 492nd Fighter Sqadron)
	Normandy	6 June 1944 – 24 July 1944	492nd Fighter Sqadron
	Northern France	25 July 1944 – 14 September 1944	492nd Fighter Sqadron
	Rhineland	15 September 1944 – 21 March 1945	492nd Fighter Sqadron
	Ardennes-Alsace	16 December 1944 – 25 January 1945	492nd Fighter Sqadron
	Central Europe	29 March 1945 – 21 May 1945	492nd Fighter Sqadron
	Defense of Saudi Arabia	2 August 1990 – 16 January 1991	492nd Tactical Fighter Sqadron
	Liberation and Defense of Kuwait	17 January 1991 – 11 April 1991	492nd Tactical Fighter Sqadron
	Southwest Asia Cease-Fire	12 April 1991 – 30 November 1995	492nd Tactical Fighter Sqadron (later 492nd Fighter Squadron)
	Air Campaign	24 March 1999 – 10 June 1999	492nd Expeditionary Fighter Squadron

== See also ==
- List of United States Air Force fighter squadrons
- List of McDonnell Douglas F-15 Eagle operators
- List of F-4 Phantom II operators
- List of F-100 units of the United States Air Force
- List of F-86 Sabre units
- List of Douglas A-20 Havoc operators
