= Lansing Pilch =

U.S. Air Force general

Lansing R. Pilch
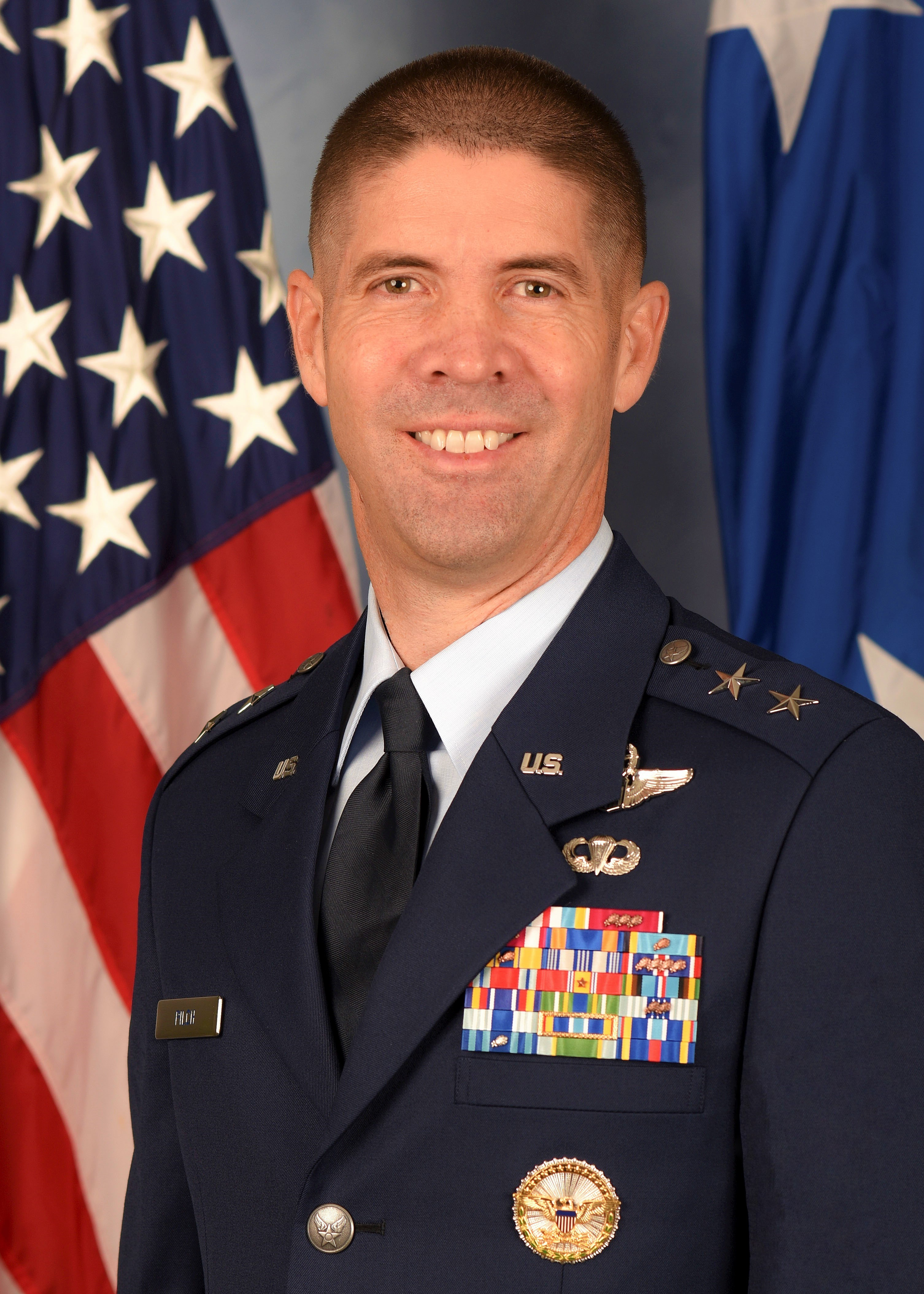
- Born: Stockton, New Jersey, U.S.
- Military career
- Allegiance: United States
- Branch: United States Air Force
- Service years: 1993–2021 (33 years)
- Rank: Major General
- Commands: Thirteenth Expeditionary Air Force; 380th Air Expeditionary Wing; 33rd Fighter Wing; 3rd Operations Group; 27th Fighter Squadron
- Awards: Defense Superior Service Medal; Legion of Merit (4)

Lansing Robert Pilch is a retired United States Air Force major general who last served as the Director of Air and Cyberspace Operations of the Pacific Air Forces, as well as the commander of the Thirteenth Expeditionary Air Force. Previously, he was the Commander of the 380th Air Expeditionary Wing.

Raised in Delaware Township, Hunterdon County, New Jersey, Pilch graduated from Hunterdon Central Regional High School in 1989 and was inducted into the school's hall of fame in 2020.

Military offices
Preceded by Todd D. Canterbury	Commander of the 33rd Fighter Wing; 2015–2017	Succeeded by Paul D. Moga
Preceded by ???	Vice Commander of the Seventh Air Force; 2017–2019	Succeeded by David Eaglin
Preceded by Adrian Spain	Commander of the 380th Air Expeditionary Wing; 2019–2020	Succeeded by Larry Broadwell
Preceded by Scott L. Pleus	Director of Air and Cyberspace Operations of the Pacific Air Forces; 2020–2021	Succeeded by David R. Iverson
Preceded by Scott L. Pleus	Commander of the Thirteenth Expeditionary Air Force; 2020–2021	Succeeded by David R. Iverson
