= Gregory Guillot =

United States Air Force general

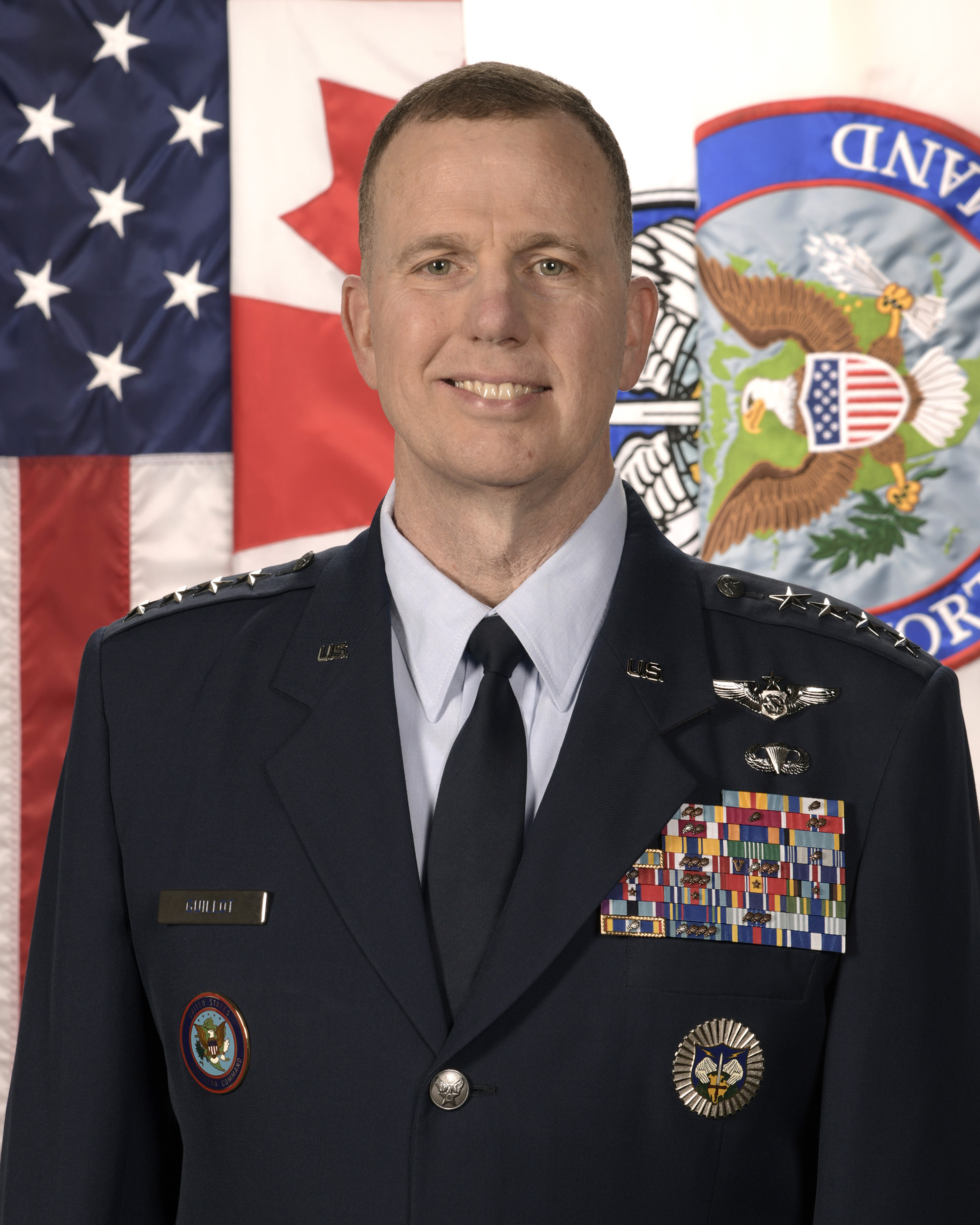
- Official portrait, 2024
- Born: Gregory Michael Guillot; 1966-67 (aged 58-60); Tucson, Arizona, U.S.
- Allegiance: United States
- Branch: United States Air Force
- Service years: 1989–present
- Rank: General
- Commands: United States Northern Command; North American Aerospace Defense Command; Ninth Air Force; 55th Wing; 552nd Air Control Wing; 380th Expeditionary Operations Group; 965th Airborne Air Control Squadron
- Awards: Defense Distinguished Service Medal; Air Force Distinguished Service Medal (2); Defense Superior Service Medal (3); Legion of Merit (2); Bronze Star Medal (3)
- Education: University of Arizona (attended); United States Air Force Academy (BS)

Gregory Michael Guillot is a United States Air Force general who has served as the commander of United States Northern Command and North American Aerospace Defense Command since 5 February 2024. He most recently served as the deputy commander of United States Central Command from 2022 to 2024. He served as commander of the Ninth Air Force from 2020 to 2022.

== Biography ==
Gregory Michael Guillot is from Tucson, Arizona, and graduated from Sabino High School in 1984. He attended the University of Arizona before transferring to the United States Air Force Academy where he graduated in 1989 and commissioned as a second lieutenant. He was selected as an air battle manager in 1990, and attended the initial training course at Tyndall AFB.

Guillot was the chief of Weapons and Tactics at the 607th Air Control Squadron at Luke AFB, and attended USAF Weapons School at Nellis AFB in 1995. He later served as a Weapons School instructor, and flew on the E-3 Sentry AWACS at Tinker AFB. He served as the Director of Operations at the 966th Airborne Air Control Squadron, and later as the commander of the 965th Airborne Air Control Squadron. In May 2010, he became the commander of the 380th Expeditionary Operations Group at Al Dhafra Air Base. In June 2012, he became the commander of the 552nd Air Control Wing, and was the commander of the 55th Wing at Offutt AFB from 2013 to 2015. Prior to taking command of the Ninth Air Force, he served as the Director of Operations at United States Northern Command.

In May 2022, Guillot was nominated for assignment as deputy commander of U.S. Central Command. In May 2023, Guillot was nominated for promotion to general and assignment as the commander of United States Northern Command and North American Aerospace Defense Command.

== Awards and decorations ==

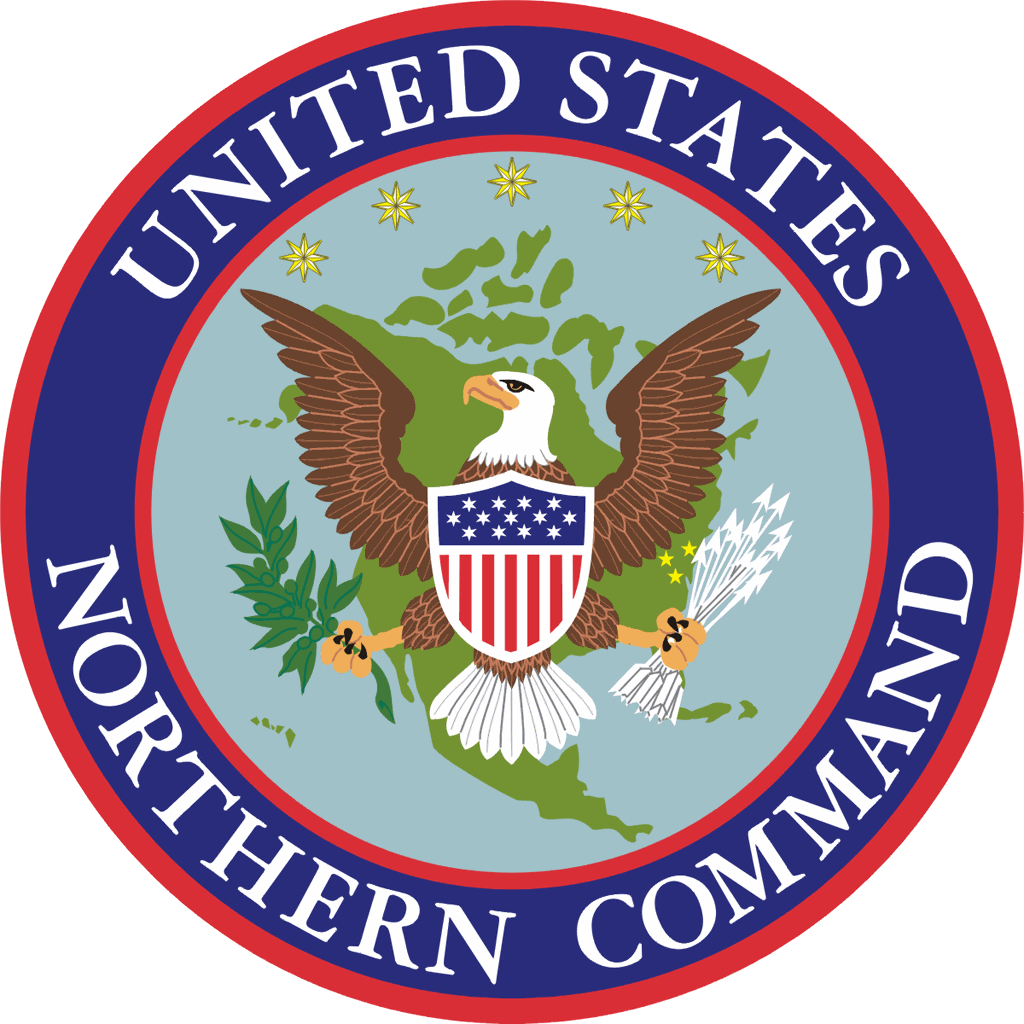

Senior Air Battle Manager Badge
U.S Army Basic Parachutist Badge
Defense Distinguished Service Medal
U.S. Air Force Service Medal w/ 1 bronze oak leaf cluster	Defense Superior Service Medal w/ 2 bronze oak leaf clusters	Legion of Merit w/ 1 bronze oak leaf cluster
Bronze Star Medal w/ 1 bronze oak leaf cluster	Meritorious Service Medal w/ 1 silver oak leaf cluster and 1 bronze oak leaf cluster	Air Medal
Aerial Achievement Medal	Air and Space Commendation Medal	Army Commendation Medal
Air and Space Achievement Medal w/ 1 bronze oak leaf cluster	Joint Meritorious Unit Award w/ 1 bronze oak leaf cluster	Meritorious Unit Award w/ 3 bronze oak leaf clusters
Air and Space Outstanding Unit Award w/ "V" Device and 7 oak leaf clusters	Air and Space Outstanding Unit Award	Air and Space Organizational Excellence Award w/ 1 bronze oak leaf cluster
Combat Readiness Medal w/ 3 bronze oak leaf clusters	National Defense Service Medal w/ 1 service star	Armed Forces Expeditionary Medal w/ 1 service star
Kosovo Campaign Medal w/ 1 service star	Global War on Terrorism Expeditionary Medal w/ 1 service star	Global War on Terrorism Service Medal
Korea Defense Service Medal	Humanitarian Service Medal	Nuclear Deterrence Operations Service Medal
Air and Space Overseas Short Tour Service Ribbon w/ 3 bronze oak leaf clusters	Air and Space Overseas Long Tour Service Ribbon	Air Force Expeditionary Service Ribbon w/ 1 silver oak leaf cluster and gold frame
Air and Space Longevity Service Award w/ 1 silver oak leaf cluster and 4 bronze oak leaf clusters	Air and Space Training Ribbon	NATO Medal for Kosovo
Joint Chiefs of Staff insignia
North American Aerospace Defense Command Badge
United States Northern Command Badge

== Effective dates of promotions ==
Insignia	Rank	Date
	General	4 Feb 2024
	Lieutenant general	16 July 2020
	Major general	2 Aug 2018
	Brigadier general	14 Aug 2014
	Colonel	1 Sep 2008
	Lieutenant colonel	1 April 2004
	Major	1 Sep 2000
	Captain	31 May 1993
	First lieutenant	31 May 1991
	Second lieutenant	31 May 1989

Military offices
Preceded by John T. Rauch	Commander of the 552nd Air Control Wing; 2012–2013	Succeeded by Jay Bickley
Preceded by John T. Rauch	Commander of the 55th Wing; 2013–2015	Succeeded by Marty Reynolds
Preceded by Joseph T. Guastella	Commander of the Ninth Air Force; 2020–2022	Succeeded by Alexus Grynkewich
Preceded by Glen D. VanHerck	Commander of the United States Northern Command and the North American Aerospace Defense Command; 2024–present	Incumbent
U.S. order of precedence (ceremonial)
Preceded by Stephen Whiting as Commander of U.S. Space Command	Order of precedence of the United States as Commander of U.S. Northern Command	Succeeded by Samuel Paparo as Commander of U.S. Indo-Pacific Command
