= 396th =

396th may refer to:

- 396th Bombardment Group, inactive United States Air Force unit
- 396th Bombardment Squadron, associate unit of the 15th Wing at Joint Base Pearl Harbor-Hickam, Hawaii
- 396th Fighter Squadron or 182d Fighter Squadron, unit of the Texas Air National Guard 149th Fighter Wing located at Kelly Field Annex
- 396th Infantry, infantry regiment of the United States Army National Guard that saw action in World War I and World War II

== See also ==
- 396 (number)
- 396, the year 396 (CCCXCVI) of the Julian calendar
- 396 BC
