= 965th Airborne Air Control Squadron =

965th Airborne Air Control Squadron

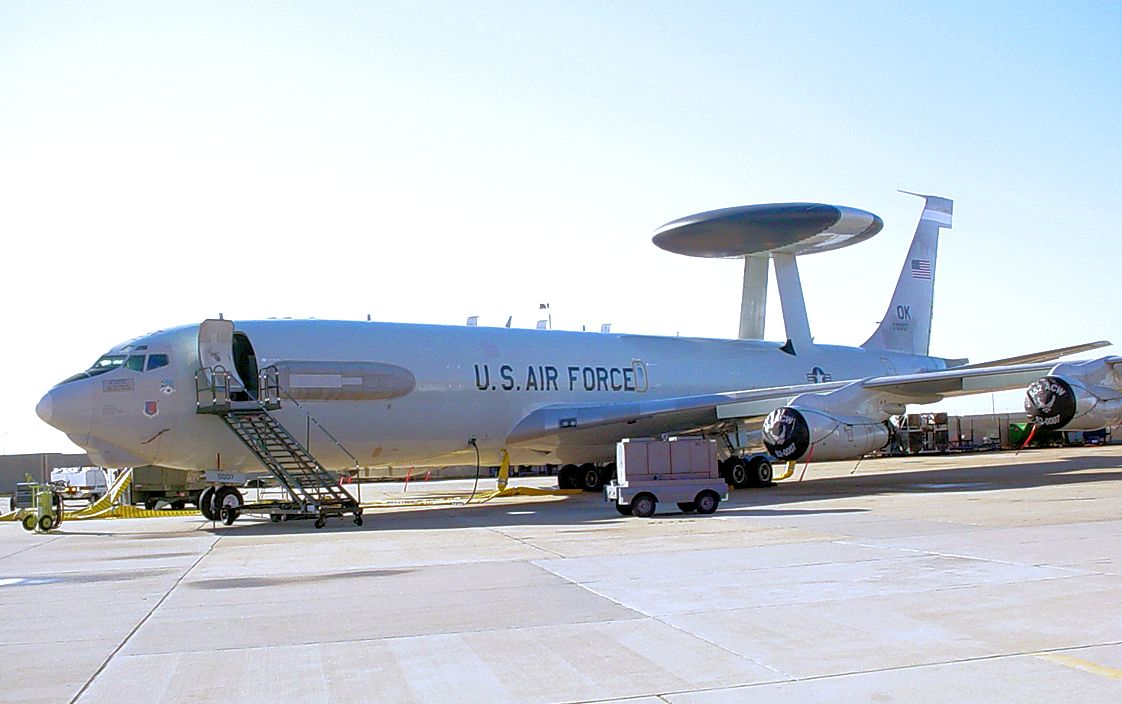
- 552d Air Control Wing Boeing E-3 Sentry at Tinker AFB
- Active: 1943–1944; 1944–1945; 1955–1971; 1978–present
- Country: United States
- Branch: United States Air Force
- Role: Airborne Command and Control
- Part of: Air Combat Command
- Garrison/HQ: Tinker Air Force Base
- Motto: Semper Vigiles (Latin for 'Always Watchful')
- Engagements: China-Burma-India Theater; Global war on terrorism
- Decorations: Air Force Outstanding Unit Award with Combat "V" Device; Air Force Meritorious Unit Award; Air Force Outstanding Unit Award; Republic of Vietnam Gallantry Cross with Palm

Insignia
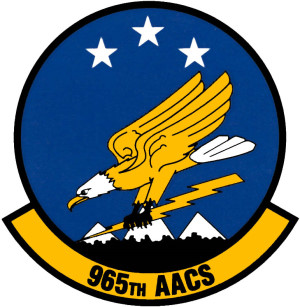
- 965th Airborne Air Control Squadron emblem (Note: Approved 31 January 1979. On a Blue disc edged with a narrow Black border, arising in base a Black mountain with three White peaks surmounted by an eagle in descent, (head, neck and tail feathers White, body, upper legs and beak Yellow, lower legs, eye, claws, and details Black) grasping a Yellow lightning bolt; in the top of the disc an arc of three White five-pointed stars.)

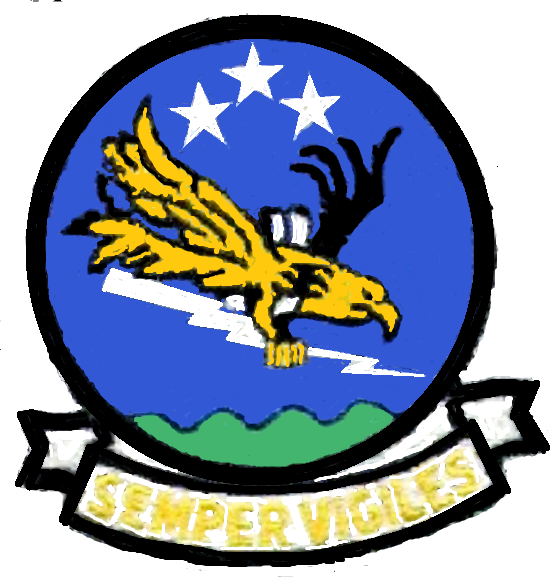
- 965th Airborne Early Warning and Control Squadron emblem (Note: Approved 4 September 1956.)

The 965th Airborne Air Control Squadron is part of the 552d Air Control Wing at Tinker Air Force Base, Oklahoma. It operates Boeing E-3 Sentry aircraft conducting airborne command and control missions.

The first two antecedents of the squadron were active during World War II. The 595th Bombardment Squadron served as an Operational and Replacement Training Unit, before being inactivated in a general reorganization of Army Air Forces training units. The 165th Liaison Squadron performed special operations in India and Burma from September 1944 until the end of the war, when it returned to the United States for inactivation.

The unit's other predecessor unit was activated in 1955 as the 965th Airborne Early Warning and Control Squadron. It performed air defense patrols off the Pacific coast of the United States until inactivating in 1971. It was activated again at Tinker Air Force Base, Oklahoma in 1978 as the 965th Airborne Warning and Control Squadron,

== Mission ==
The 965th Airborne Air Control Squadron provides worldwide response with the Boeing E-3 Sentry airborne warning and control aircraft. The squadron provides mission-ready aircrews to support the E-3's all-altitude "deep look" surveillance, early warning, control and airborne management roles in a variety of tactical, strategic and special missions.

== History ==
=== World War II ===
==== Bombardment training ====
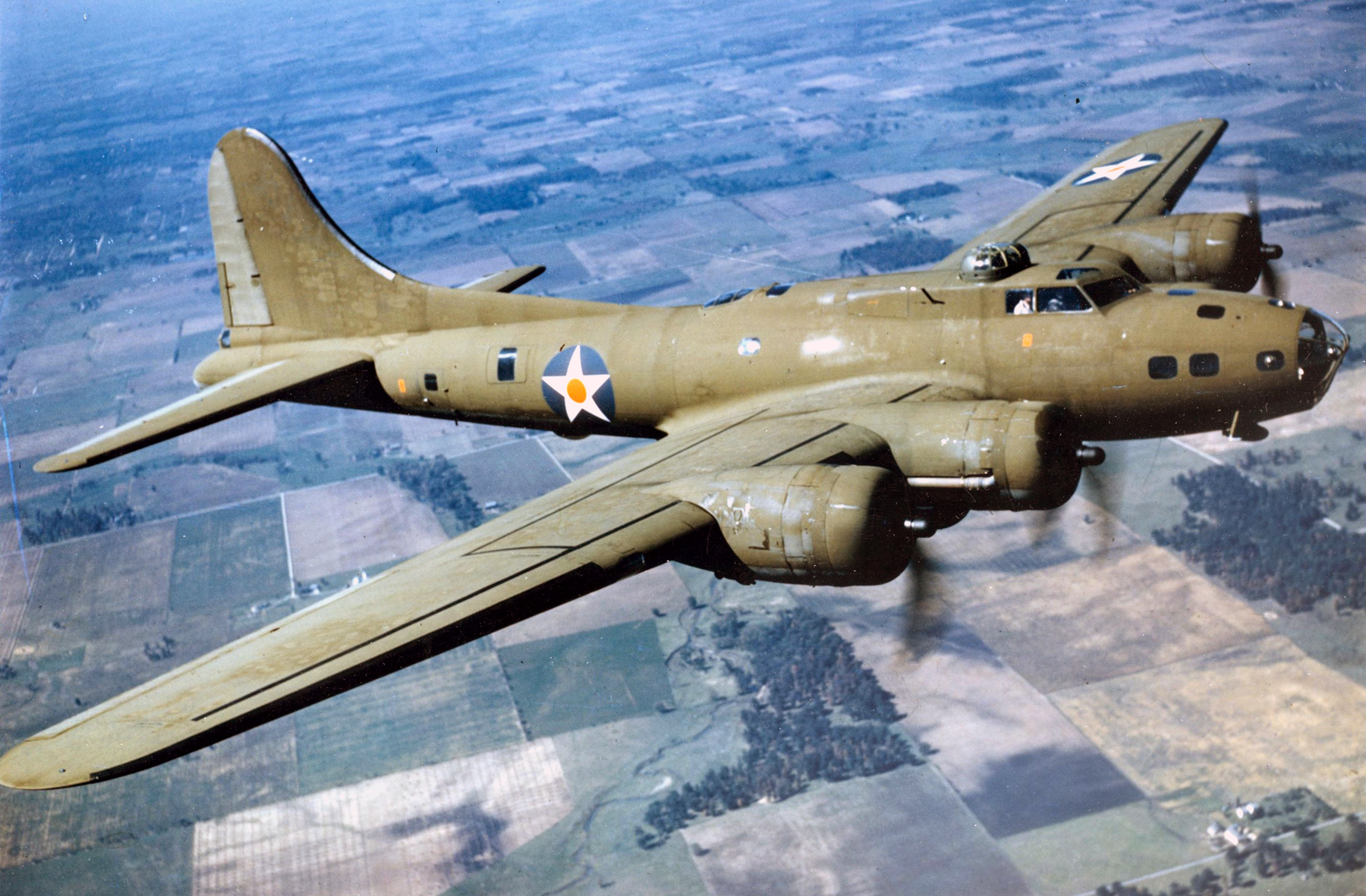
B-17 Flying Fortress

The 595th Bombardment Squadron was first activated at Mountain Home Army Air Field, Idaho on 16 February 1943 as one of the four original squadrons of the 396th Bombardment Group. After initial organization and equipping with Boeing B-17 Flying Fortress heavy bombers, the squadron moved to Moses Lake Army Air Base, Washington. There the squadron acted as an Operational Training Unit (OTU) for B-17 units. The OTU program was patterned after the unit training system of the Royal Air Force. The OTU program involved the use of an oversized parent unit to provide cadres to "satellite groups". It assumed responsibility for their training and oversaw their expansion with graduates of Army Air Forces Training Command schools to become effective combat units. Phase I training concentrated on individual training in crewmember specialties. Phase II training emphasized the coordination for the crew to act as a team. The final phase concentrated on operation as a unit. In August 1943, the unit's mission changed to being a Replacement Training Unit (RTU). By This time most combat units had been activated and many of them had deployed overseas. With the exception of special programs, like forming Boeing B-29 Superfortress units, training "fillers" (individual pilots or aircrews) for existing units became more important than unit training. Like OTUs, RTUs were oversized units. Their mission, however was to train individual pilots or aircrews.

In November 1943, the 595th moved to Drew Field, Florida, where it would remain for the duration of its active service. However, the Army Air Forces was finding that standard military units, based on relatively inflexible tables of organization were not well adapted to the training mission. Accordingly, it adopted a more functional system in which each base was organized into a separate numbered unit. The 592d was inactivated on 1 May 1944 at Drew Field, Florida. Its personnel and equipment became part of the 326th AAF Base Unit.

==== Special operations in Burma ====
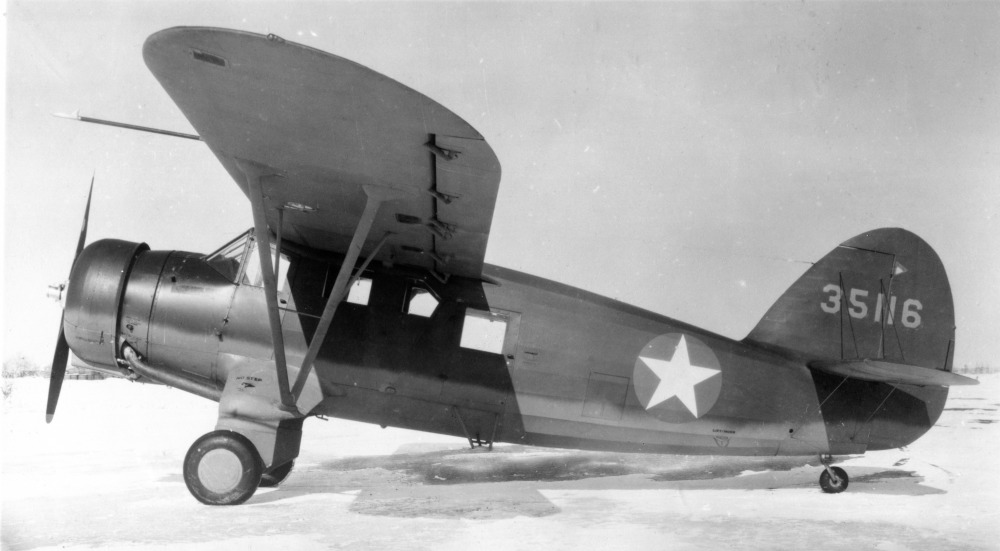
UC–64 Norseman

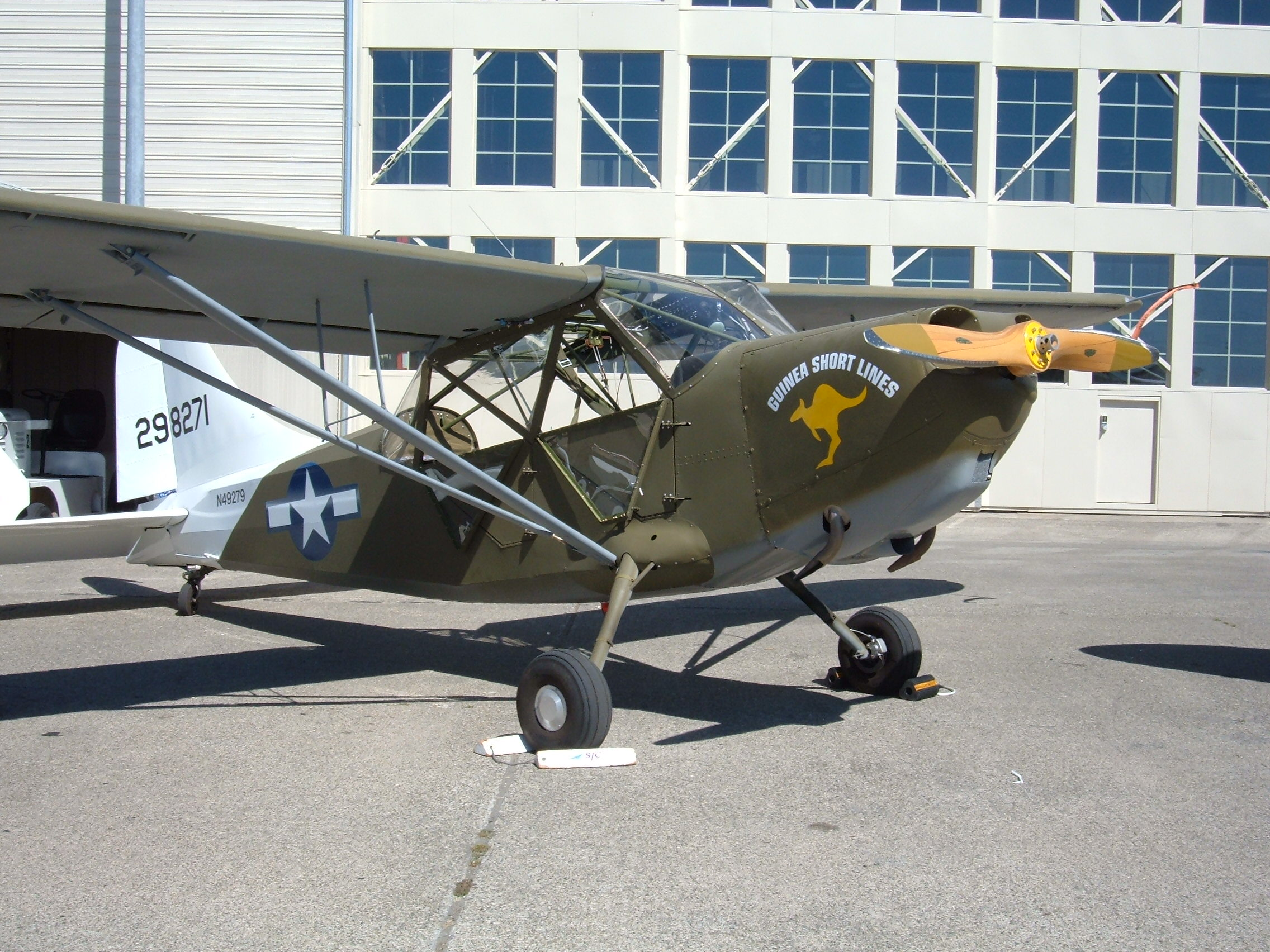
L-5 Sentinel

The 165th Liaison Squadron was activated at Asansol, India as part of the 1st Air Commando Group in September 1944. It was manned almost entirely by enlisted pilots. The following month it moved to Burma, where, along with other airlift elements of the 1st Air Commando Group, it operated under Eastern Air Command's Combat Cargo Task Force. It flew evacuation missions and provided light transport services for ground forces in Burma from various locations until 23 April 1945. Following the fall of Rangoon, It returned to Asansol, where it came under the control of Northern Combat Area Command, and remained there until October, when it returned to the United States. It was inactivated two days after its arrival at the New York Port of Embarkation on 1 November 1945.

=== Air defense ===
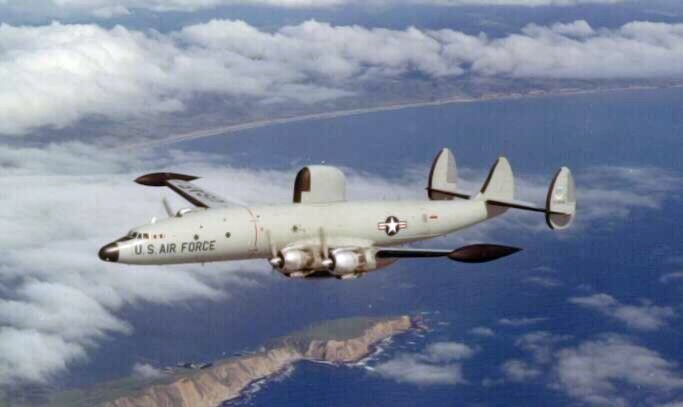
EC-121 Warning Star over Thailand

The 965th Airborne Early Warning and Control Squadron was activated in August 1955 at McClellan Air Force Base, California as the third Lockheed RC-121 Warning Star (Note: In 1963, the Department of Defense standardized aircraft designations and the Air Force's RC-121s and the Navy' WVs both became EC-121s.) squadron of the 552d Airborne Early Warning and Control Wing. Squadron operations were mostly devoted to training with the new systems, with the unit becoming an active part of Air Defense Command (ADC)'s radar network in March 1956. The squadron flew patrols off the Pacific coast that extended the air defense radar coverage beyond the range of ground-based radar sites. late in 1958, the squadron also began flying gap filler missions when ground radar sites were inoperative. After 1957, it deployed to remote parts of the Pacific to track impact points of test launches of ballistic missiles over the Pacific ranges.

At the beginning of the Cuban Missile Crisis, ADC had a single air defense orbit established in Florida, supported by the six RC-121s of the 966th Airborne Early Warning and Control Squadron. On 17 October 1962, the Joint Chiefs of Staff directed ADC to increase its presence at McCoy Air Force Base, Florida to twelve EC-121s. Crews and planes from the squadron were included in this augmentation of air defense forces, with the first plane arriving at McCoy from McClellan on 19 October. This augmentation permitted the establishment of two additional orbits to detect potential air action by Cuba. (Note: Four United States Navy radar-equipped destroyers were also added to the air defense network. NORAD/CONAD Participation in the Cuban Missile Crisis p. 11.) The additional aircraft at McCoy were released from their commitment on 3 December 1962, and returned to their home station by 5 December.

Starting in April 1965, the squadron began operating in Southeast Asia as part of the Big Eye Task Force (later renamed College Eye). College Eye operations continued until the squadron was inactivated. Initially, two orbits were maintained over the Gulf of Tonkin to support Operation Rolling Thunder from Tan Son Nhut Airport, near Saigon. From these orbits, Task Force aircraft could alert strike aircraft when enemy MiGs were launched. Squadron members rotated to the College Eye Task force on four month long temporary duty assignments. Operations later continued from bases in Thailand. A third orbit over Laos was added in October 1966, followed by reduction of the Gulf of Tonkin flights to a single orbit. This station also controlled strikes during Operation Barrel Roll. Although the squadron did not deploy as a unit to Southeast Asia, its support of these actions earned it an Air Force Outstanding Unit Award with Combat "V" Device and a Republic of Vietnam Gallantry Cross with Palm

The airborne radar mission in the United States began to be reduced at the end of 1969, and the 552nd Wing's squadrons assumed the remaining Atlantic coastal and Iceland missions. The squadron was inactivated on 30 June 1971 as these reductions continued.

=== Airborne control ===
The 965th was redesignated the 965th Airborne Warning and Control Squadron and reactivated at Tinker Air Force Base, Oklahoma on 1 July 1978 to fly the Boeing E-3 Sentry. The squadron became non-operational in September 1979, although it remained on the active list. It resumed operations at the start of 1984. Upon resumption of operations, it supported deployments to ELF One in Southwest Asia, to monitor the war between Iraq and Iran until April 1989. In September 1985, the 595th Bombardment Squadron and the 165th Liaison Squadron were consolidated with the squadron. In August 1989, the squadron began patrolling the southern border of the United States in the war against drugs. In 1990, counter drug operations expanded to include regular fights from Roosevelt Roads Naval Station, Puerto Rico.

It flew combat support missions for Operation Just Cause over Panama from 20 December 1989 to 24 January 1990. These missions included providing command and control for tanker aircraft refueling transports transporting troops to Panama. Since the refueling area was near Cuban airspace, it also included control of F-15 aircraft providing cover for the transports.

Elements of the 552nd Wing began to deploy in support of Operation Desert Shield as early as 10 August 1990. They also provided airborne control of the initial strikes in Iraq on 17 January and continued support of Operation Proven Force until 6 March 1991. In late May 1992, the 522nd Wing reorganized under the Objective Wing plan. The 965th and other operational elements of the wing were reassigned to the newly-formed 552nd Operations Group. In July 1994, the squadron name was shortened to the 965th Airborne Air Control Squadron.

The squadron supported Operations Provide Comfort and Operation Southern Watch with deployed crews and aircraft. It has been the major force provider for deployments and exercises, with its personnel and planes forming the 965th Expeditionary Airborne Air Control Squadron. Among others, these expeditionary units have served in 1999 at Incirlik Air Base, Turkey; at RAF Waddington, England in 2003; and at Elmendorf Air Force Base, Alaska (Exercise Cope Thunder 06-1)

== Lineage ==
595th Bombardment Squadron

- Constituted as the 595th Bombardment Squadron (Heavy) on 29 January 1943

Activated on 16 February 1943
Inactivated on 1 May 1944
Consolidated with the 165th Liaison Squadron and the 965th Airborne Warning and Control Squadron as the 965th Airborne Warning and Control Squadron on 19 September 1985

165th Liaison Squadron

- Constituted as the 165th Liaison Squadron (Commando) on 9 August 1944

Activated on 3 September 1944
Inactivated on 3 Nov 1945
Consolidated with the 595th Bombardment Squadron and the 965th Airborne Warning and Control Squadron as the 965th Airborne Warning and Control Squadron on 19 September 1985

965th Airborne Air Control Squadron

- Constituted as the 965th Airborne Early Warning and Control Squadron on 28 April 1955

Activated on 8 August 1955
Inactivated on 30 June 1971

- Redesignated 965th Airborne Warning and Control Squadron on 28 February 1978

Activated on 1 July 1978
Consolidated with the 595th Bombardment Squadron and the 165th Liaison Squadron on 19 September 1985
Redesignated 965th Airborne Air Control Squadron on 1 July 1994

=== Assignments ===
- 396th Bombardment Group, 16 February 1943 – 1 May 1944
- 1st Air Commando Group, 3 September 1944 – 3 November 1945
- 552d Airborne Early Warning and Control Wing, 8 August 1955 – 30 June 1971
- 552d Airborne Warning and Control Wing (later 552d Airborne Warning and Control Division, 552d Airborne Warning and Control Wing, 552d Air Control Wing), 1 July 1978
- 552d Operations Group, 29 May 1992 – present

=== Stations ===
- Mountain Home Army Air Field, Idaho, 16 February 1943
- Moses Lake Army Air Base, Washington, 10 April 1943
- Drew Field, Florida, 5 Nov 1943 – 1 May 1944
- Asansol, India, 3 September 1944
- Tamu, Burma, 14 October 1944
- Yazagyo, Burma, 6 November 1944
- Asansol, India, 27 November 1944
- Kawlin, Burma, 28 December 1944 (detachment operated from Inbaung, Burma, 3–22 January 1945)
- Ye-U, Burma, 10 January 1945
- Asansol, India, 21 February 1945
- Shwebo, Burma, 22 January 1945
- Sinthe, Burma, 14 March 1945
- Asansol, India, 25 April–6 October 1945
- Camp Kilmer, New Jersey, 1–3 November 1945
- McClellan Air Force Base, California, 8 August 1955 – 30 June 1971
- Tinker Air Force Base, Oklahoma, 1 Jul 1978 – present)

=== Aircraft ===
- Boeing B-17 Flying Fortress (1943–1944)
- Noorduyn C-64 Norseman (1944–1945)
- Stinson L-5 Sentinel (1944–1945)
- Lockheed RC-121 (later EC-121) Constellation (1955–1971)
- Boeing E-3 Sentry (1978–1979, 1984–present)

=== Awards and campaigns ===
Award streamer	Award	Dates	Notes
	Air Force Outstanding Unit Award with Combat "V" Device	1 July 1969–30 June 1970	965th Airborne Early Warning & Control Squadron
	Air Force Outstanding Unit Award with Combat "V" Device	1 June 2002–31 May 2003	965th Airborne Air Control Squadron
	Air Force Meritorious Unit Award	1 June 2006–31 May 2007	965th Airborne Air Control Squadron
	Air Force Outstanding Unit Award	1 July 1961–30 June 1963	965th Airborne Early Warning & Control Squadron
	Air Force Outstanding Unit Award	15 Apr 1965–1 Jul 1966	965th Airborne Early Warning & Control Squadron
	Air Force Outstanding Unit Award	2 July 1966–1 July 1968	965th Airborne Early Warning & Control Squadron
	Air Force Outstanding Unit Award	1 July 1970–30 June 1971	
	Air Force Outstanding Unit Award	1 January 1984–30 June 1984	965th Airborne Warning and Control Squadron
	Air Force Outstanding Unit Award	1 May 1987–30 April 1989	965th Airborne Warning and Control Squadron
	Air Force Outstanding Unit Award	1 December 1989–1 December 1991	965th Airborne Warning and Control Squadron
	Air Force Outstanding Unit Award	1 June 2003-31 May 2004	965th Airborne Air Control Squadron
	Air Force Outstanding Unit Award	1 June 2007-31 May 2008	965th Airborne Air Control Squadron
	Air Force Outstanding Unit Award	1 June 2011-31 May 2012	965th Airborne Air Control Squadron
	Air Force Outstanding Unit Award	1 June 2012-31 May 2013	965th Airborne Air Control Squadron
	Air Force Outstanding Unit Award	1 June 2013-31 May 2014	965th Airborne Air Control Squadron
	Vietnamese Gallantry Cross with Palm	1 April 1966–28 June 1971	965th Airborne Early Warning & Control Squadron

Campaign Streamer	Campaign	Dates	Notes
	American Theater without inscription	19 January 1943 – 1 May 1944	595th Bombardment Squadron
	India-Burma	2 April 1943 – 28 January 1945	165th Liaison Squadron
	Central Burma	29 January 1945 – 15 July 1945	165th Liaison Squadron
	Just Cause	20 December 1989 – 31 January 1990	965th Airborne Warning and Control Squadron
	Defense of Saudi Arabia	2 August 1990 – 16 January 1991	965th Airborne Warning and Control Squadron
	Liberation and Defense of Kuwait	17 January 1991 – 11 April 1991	965th Airborne Warning and Control Squadron
	Global War on Terror Expeditionary Medal		965th Airborne Air Control Squadron
	Iraqi Surge	10 January 2007 – 31 December 2008	965th Airborne Air Control Squadron
	Iraqi Sovereignty	1 January 2009 – 31 August 2010	965th Airborne Air Control Squadron
