= Larson Air Force Base =

Former US Air Force base in Grant County, WA, US

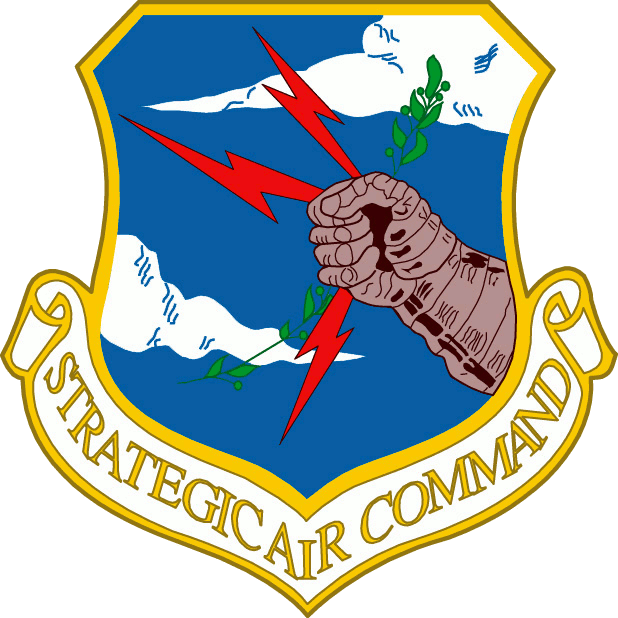
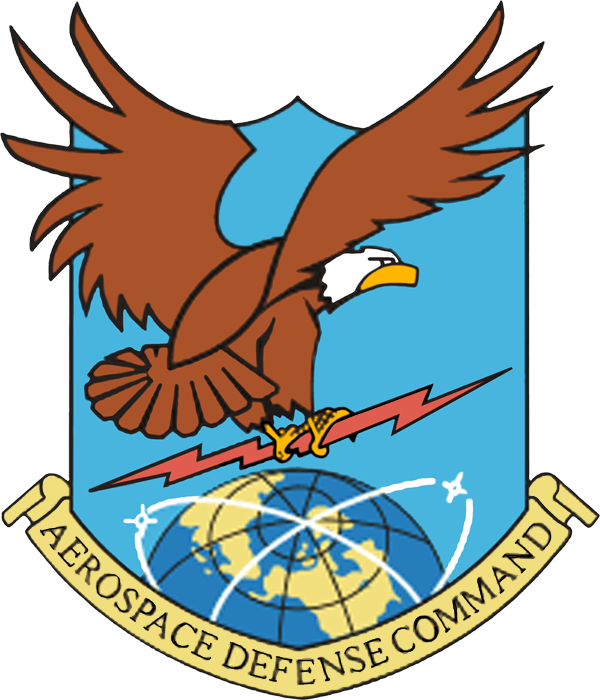
Larson Air Force Base Moses Lake Air Force Base
- Part of Strategic Air Command; Air Defense Command
- Grant County, near Moses Lake, Washington
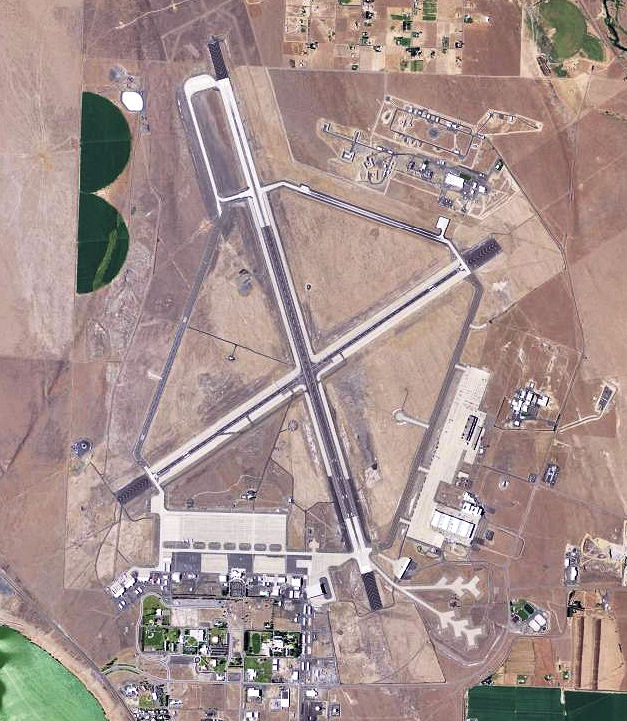
- 2006 USGS Orthophoto

Site information
- Type: Military airbase - U.S. Air Force

Location
- Location within Washington (state)
- Coordinates: 47°12′28″N 119°19′13″W

Site history
- Built: 1941–1942
- Built by: U.S. Government
- In use: 1942–1966
- Battles/wars: World War II (training), Cold War

Larson Air Force Base is a former United States Air Force base located five miles (8 km) northwest of the central business district (CBD) of Moses Lake, in Grant County, Washington. After its closure in 1966, the airport facility became Grant County International Airport.

== History ==
=== World War II ===
Originally named Moses Lake Army Air Base, the airfield was activated on 24 November 1942 as a temporary World War II training center. Moses Lake AAB was a sub-base of Spokane Air Technical Service Command, headquartered at Spokane Army Airfield.

The first operational training unit (OTU) at the base was the 482d Fighter Squadron, which conducted twin-engine fighter training for P-38 Lightning fighters. On 5 April 1943, the 396th Bombardment Group became a second OTU at the base, providing first phase heavy bomber training for the B-17 Flying Fortress with its 592d Bombardment Squadron, 593d Bombardment Squadron, 594th Bombardment Squadron and 595th Bombardment Squadrons.

The first flight of the XB-47 took place on 17 Dec. 1947, originating at Boeing Field and terminating at Moses Lake Air Force Base. In Feb. 1949, a B-47 took off from Larson, headed east and "broke all coast-to-coast speed records" with an average speed of 607.8 miles per hour.

=== Air Defense Command ===
Moses Lake AFB reopened as a permanent installation on 26 August 1948, being transferred from Air Materiel Command to the Air Defense Command (ADC). The initial ADC base operating unit was the 2755th Air Base Squadron. Under ADC, the base came under the Western Air Defense Force, headquartered at Hamilton AFB, California.

The base was renamed Larson Air Force Base was named in honor of Major Donald A. Larson, USAAF, in May 1950. Born and raised in Yakima, Washington, Larson was a fighter pilot and ace who flew 57 combat missions in Europe during World War II. He was killed in action while assigned to the VIII Fighter Command 505th Fighter Squadron. Larson's P-51D Mustang (AAF Ser. No. 44-13881, nose-name "Mary, Queen of Scotts") was shot down and crashed on 4 August 1944 near Uelzen, Germany.

==== Interceptors ====
The primary mission of Larson-based ADC aircraft was to protect the secret Hanford Atomic Works and the Grand Coulee Dam.

The first ADC flying unit to arrive was the 325th Fighter-Interceptor Group, which arrived on 26 November 1948. The mission of the 325th FIG was to conduct ADC's All Weather Combat Crew Training School. Its operational component, the 317th Fighter Interceptor Squadron, initially flew Northrop P-61 Black Widows, almost immediately transitioning to the North American F-82 Twin Mustang. A second squadron, the 319th Fighter Interceptor Squadron arrived on 2 September 1949, being reassigned from McChord AFB. The 319th also flew the F-82 Twin Mustang. The 325th FIG remained at Moses Lake until being reassigned to McChord AFB on 23 April 1950, along with the 317th FIS. The 319th remained until 9 February 1952 when it was reassigned to Suwon Air Base, South Korea flying F-94 Starfires.

The next ADC unit was the 81st Fighter-Interceptor Wing which arrived from 10 November 1949. The 81st FIW flew F-51D/H Mustangs, F-80C Shooting Stars and North American F-86 Sabres from the base. The 81st remained until 5 September 1951 when it was reassigned to NATO and deployed to RAF Shepherds Grove in the United Kingdom. During the Korean War, the 116th Fighter-Interceptor Squadron, Washington Air National Guard was called to active duty and activated at Moses Lake. The 116th FIS was deployed as part of the 81st Tactical Fighter Wing to RAF Shepherds Grove.

=== Tactical Air Command ===
On 21 April 1952, Larson AFB was assigned to the Tactical Air Command (TAC) under TAC's Eighteenth Air Force, which reassigned the 62nd Troop Carrier Wing from McChord AFB, Washington to the base.

On 15 April 1952, the YB-52 made its initial flight from Boeing Field to Larson Air Force Base, piloted by Tex Johnston and Col. Townsend. Johnston noted, "At three hours and eight minutes, the flight in the YB-52 was the longest-duration maiden flight in the history of aviation and introduced one of the world's great airplanes."

=== Strategic Air Command ===
On 25 May 1959, the Strategic Air Command (SAC) issued General Order 38, which established the 4170th Strategic Wing (later renamed the 462nd Strategic Aerospace Wing) at Larson AFB effective 1 July 1959. On 1 January 1960, the 4170th SW took over Larson AFB. In 1963, the 4170th was redesignated as the 462d Strategic Aerospace Wing. The SAC wing at Larson AFB was equipped with B-52E Stratofortress bomber, KC-135A Stratotanker mid-air refueling aircraft, and Titan I ICBMs, located at three underground complexes surrounding the base.

In the SAC era at Larson AFB, the 4170th SW/462nd SAW had five commanders:

- Lt. Col. Robert R. Johnston, 1959–1960
- Col. Everett W. Best, 1960–1961
- Col. David A. Tate, 1961–1965
- Col. Alex W. Talmant, 1965–1966
- Col. John G. Martin Jr., 1966

Under SAC, Larson AFB was commanded by four men who each held a dual role as base commander and commander of the Combat Support Group:

- Lt. Col. Charles T. Olmsted, 1959–1960
- Col. William R. Calhoun Jr., 1960–1961
- Lt. Col. Richard D. Salter, 1961–1963
- Col. Clyde W. Owen, 1963–1966

SAC's 568th Strategic Missile Squadron (SMS) headquartered at Larson AFB operated the three Titan I missile sites that surrounded Moses Lake. The 568th SMS was led by three commanders:

- Col. Robert S. Milner, 1960–1963
- Col. Bernard J. Schutten, 1963–1964
- Col. Robert E. Mullin, 1964–1965

=== Civil use ===
With the closure of the Larson AFB in 1966, Colonel Owen retired from the Air Force and became the first director of the Port of Moses Lake, overseeing the transfer of the property from the U.S. Government to Grant County International Airport.

Following the Air Force's departure in 1966, the airfield has continued to support operations from McChord's 62d Airlift Wing over the years, as the wing's Lockheed C-141 Starlifter, Lockheed C-130 Hercules, and currently Boeing C-17 Globemaster III aircraft have practiced approaches and both normal landings and tactical assault landings on a regular basis.

The 92nd Air Refueling Wing at Fairchild Air Force Base in Spokane temporarily moved its KC-135 R/T fleet and operations to Moses Lake in 2011 while Fairchild's runway underwent reconstruction and other infrastructure improvements, to include an upgrade to the base's aviation fuel distribution system.

For over four decades, Japan Air Lines trained its 747 crews at the facility, until 2009.

=== Previous names ===
- Moses Lake Army Air Base, 1942–1945
- Moses Lake Air Force Base, 1948–1950
- Larson Air Force Base, 1950–1966

=== Major commands to which assigned ===
- Fourth Air Force, 1942–1943
- II Bomber Command, 1943–1945
- Air Defense Command, 1948–1952
- Tactical Air Command, 1952–1957
- Military Air Transport Service, 1957–1960
- Strategic Air Command, 1960–1966

=== Major units assigned ===
- 482d Fighter Squadron, 1942–1943
- 396th Bombardment Group, 1943–1945
- 325th Fighter-Interceptor Group, 1948–1950
- 81st Fighter-Interceptor Wing, 1949–1951
- 62d Troop Carrier Wing, 1952–1960
- 71st Strategic Reconnaissance Wing, 1955–1957
- 4170th Strategic Wing, 1960

Redesignated 462d Strategic Aerospace Wing, 1963–1966.

=== Air Defense Command units ===
Known ADC units and squadrons assigned to Larson were:

- 82d Fighter Interceptor Squadron (6 February 1952 – 1 April 1953) (F-94B Starfire)

Assigned to: 4702d Defense Wing
Reassigned from: Hamilton AFB, California
Reassigned to: MATS Iceland Air Defense Force at NAS Keflavik, Iceland

- 31st Fighter-Interceptor Squadron (20 April 1953 – 18 August 1955) (F-86D Sabre)

Activated at Larson to replace 82d Fighter-Interceptor Squadron
Assigned to: 4702d Air Defense Wing, 20 April 1953
Reassigned to: 84th Fighter Group (Air Defense) at Wurtsmith AFB, Michigan

- 322d Fighter-Interceptor Squadron (18 August 1955 – 1 April 1959) (F-86D Sabre)

Activated at Larson to replace 31st Fighter-Interceptor Squadron
Assigned to: 9th Air Division, 18 August 1955 – 1 December 1956
Assigned to: 4721st Air Defense Group, 1 December 1956 – 1 April 1959
Reassigned to: Kingsley Field, Oregon upon SAC taking control of Larson AFB.

- 323d Fighter-Interceptor Squadron (26 November 1952 – 18 August 1955) (F-86D Sabre)

Assigned to: 4794th Air Defense Wing 26 November 1952 – 19 January 1953
Assigned to: 4702d Air Defense Wing, 19 January 1953 – 8 October 1954
Assigned to: 9th Air Division, 8 October 1954 – 18 August 1955
Activated at Larson AFB
Reassigned to: 84th Fighter Group (Air Defense) at Truax Field, Wisconsin

- 538th Fighter-Interceptor Squadron (18 August 1955 – 1 July 1960) (F-86D/L Sabre, F-104A/B Starfighter (1958–1960))

Activated at Larson to replace 323d Fighter-Interceptor Squadron
Assigned to: 9th Air Division, 18 August 1955 – 1 December 1956
Assigned to: 4721st Air Defense Group, 1 December 1956
Assigned to: 4700th Air Defense Wing, 1 May 1959
Assigned to: Spokane Air Defense Sector, 15 May – 1 July 1960
Discontinued upon SAC taking control of Larson AFB.

=== Intercontinental ballistic missile facilities ===
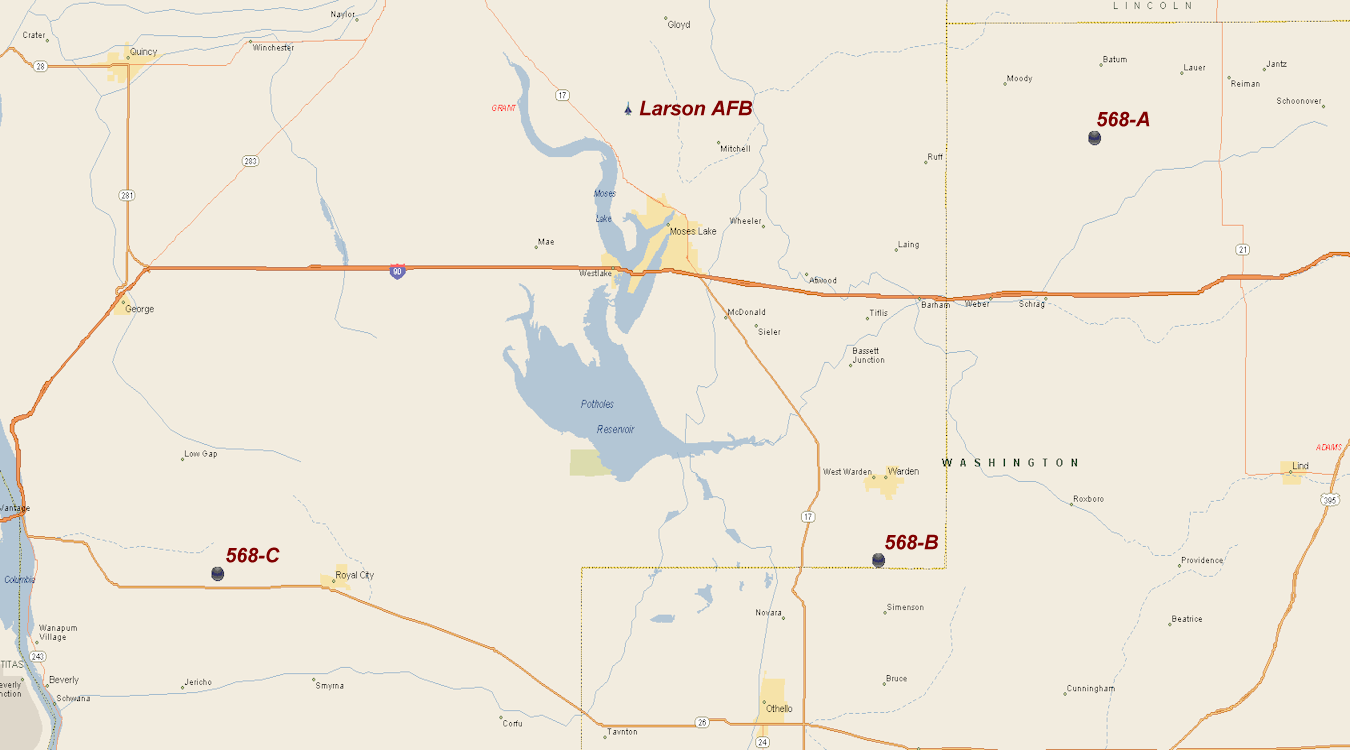
568th Strategic Missile Squadron – HGM-25A Titan I Missile Sites

The 568th Strategic Missile Squadron Operated three HGM-25A Titan I ICBM sites: (1 Apr 1961 – 25 Mar 1965)

- 568-A, 8 miles N of Schrag, Washington 47°11′16″N 118°49′22″W
- 568-B, 4 miles SSW of Warden, Washington 46°55′00″N 119°03′17″W
- 568-C, 6 miles SE of Frenchman Hills, Washington 46°54′26″N 119°45′19″W

The Titan I ICBM program at Larson was initiated in 1959 when the Walla Walla District of the Army Corps of Engineers set up an area office in October. The contractor broke ground on 1 December 1959 and the sites were turned over to SAC in early April 1961. In May 1964 Secretary of Defense Robert McNamara directed that the phase-out of the Atlas and Titan I missiles be accelerated, and in January 1965 the missiles of the 568th were taken off operational alert. The squadron was inactivated 2 months later.

Today, site "A" appears to be largely intact, the owner has the facility for sale. Photos of the interior show it to be in good condition. Site "B" appears to be largely cleared, the silo launch doors of two pads appear to be open, and is also apparently also for sale. Site "C" appears to be a scrap site, filled with clutter; its underground facilities apparently are flooded by groundwater.

== See also ==
- Washington World War II Army Airfields
- List of USAF Aerospace Defense Command General Surveillance Radar Stations
