= Yazagyo =

Yazagyo Yazagya, Yazago, Yarzagyo, Yazagao
- Village
- Location in Myanmar
- Coordinates: 23°30′09″N 94°05′11″E
- Country: Myanmar
- Region: Sagaing Region
- District: Kale District
- Township: Kale Township
- Time zone: UTC+6.30 (MST)

Yazagyo (also Yazagya and Yarzagyo) is the northernmost village in Kale Township, Kale District, of western Myanmar.

The Yazagyo Airfield, where the US 965th and 966th Airborne Air Control Squadrons were stationed during World War II, is located 3 kilometres (2 mi) north of the town.
