= 568th Strategic Missile Squadron =

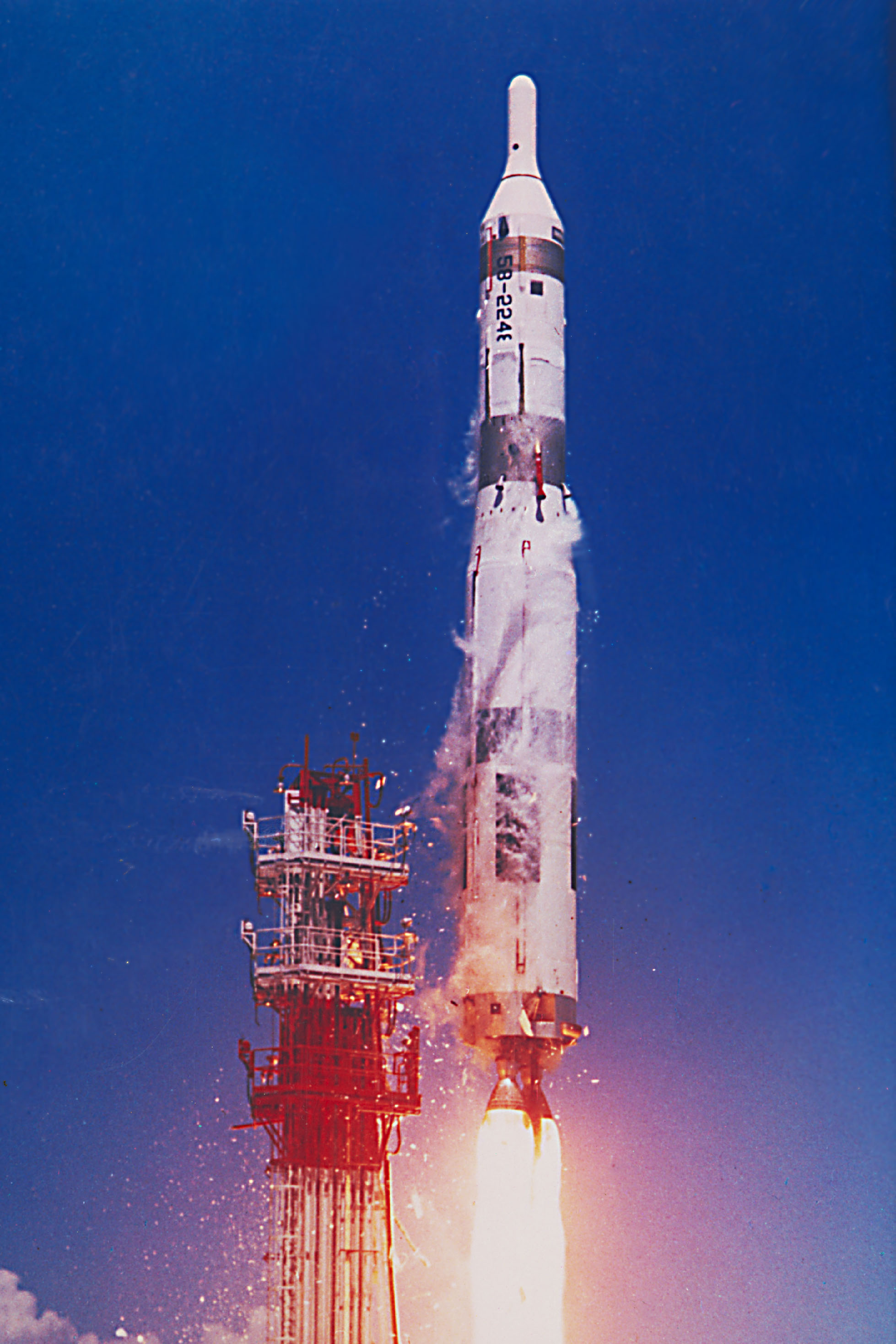
- First successful launch of an SM-68 Titan I ICBM at Cape Canaveral AFS, Florida
- Active: 1942–1945; 1947–1949; 1962–1965
- Country: United States
- Branch: United States Air Force
- Type: Squadron
- Role: Intercontinental ballistic missile
- Engagements: European Theater of Operations
- Decorations: Distinguished Unit Citation

Insignia
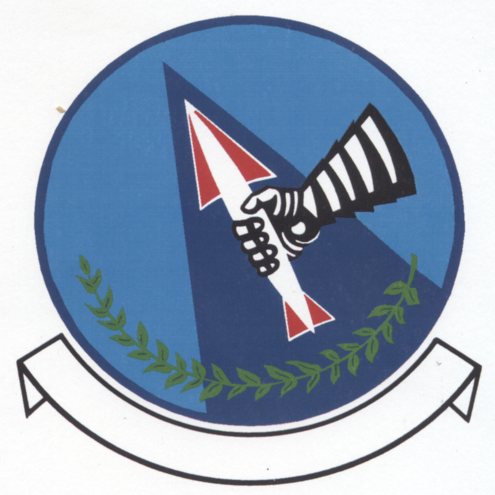
- 568th Strategic Missile Squadron emblem (Note: Approved 8 February 1963.)

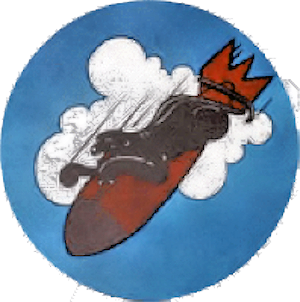
- 568th Bombardment Squadron emblem
- World War II fuselage identification code: BI

The 568th Strategic Missile Squadron is an inactive United States Air Force unit. It was last assigned to the 462d Strategic Aerospace Wing at Larson Air Force Base, Washington. It was equipped with the first-generation SM-68 Titan I intercontinental ballistic missile, with a mission of nuclear deterrence. The squadron was inactivated as part of the phaseout of the Titan I ICBM on 25 March 1965.

The squadron was first activated during World War II as the 568th Bombardment Squadron. After training in the United States, it deployed to the European Theater of Operations, where it participated in the strategic bombing campaign against Germany. It was twice awarded the Distinguished Unit Citation for its actions in combat. After V-E Day, the squadron returned to the United States, where it was inactivated in August 1945. The squadron was active in the reserve from 1947 until 1949, but does not appear to have been fully manned or equipped at this time.

== History ==
=== World War II ===
==== Activation and training in the United States ====
The squadron was first activated at Geiger Field, Washington in January 1943 as the 568th Bombardment Squadron, one of the four original squadrons of the 390th Bombardment Group. A cadre from the squadron and group went to the Army Air Force School of Applied Tactics at Orlando Army Air Base, Florida for advanced training. The 390th Group was the first to go through this training process, which was followed by later combat groups. The squadron was filled out with Boeing B-17 Flying Fortress heavy bombers beginning the following month and trained at Geiger and at Great Falls Army Air Base, Montana until early July 1943. The squadron's air echelon ferried their B-17s to England via the north Atlantic ferry route, with the first bombers arriving on 13 July. The ground echelon departed for Camp Shanks and the New York Port of Embarkation, sailing on the USAT James Parker on 17 July, reaching England ten days later.

==== Combat in the European Theater ====
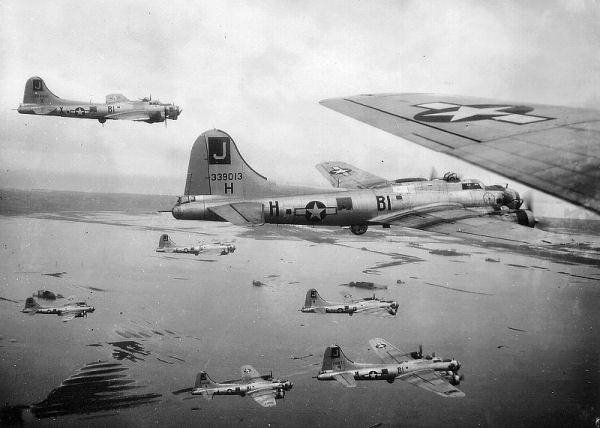
B-17s of the 568th Bomb Squadron on a mission over enemy territory (Note: Identifiable is Boeing B-17G-100-BO Flying Fortress, serial 43-39013.)

The squadron arrived at its combat station, RAF Framlingham in July 1943 and flew its first combat mission on 12 August against targets in the Ruhr. Five days later, the squadron attacked the Messerschmitt factory at Regensburg, for which it earned its first Distinguished Unit Citation (DUC). The Regensburg mission was a "shuttle" mission, and the squadron continued after striking the target to recover at Twelfth Air Force bases in North Africa. Poor weather at the departure bases extended the time required to assemble the strike force, making fuel reserves critical. Half of the fighter cover missed the rendezvous, lessening the bombers' protection. For an hour and a half after its entry into German airspace, the strike force bore attacks from German interceptors. The 390th Group suffered the heaviest losses of the leading wing, but had the best bombing results, which destroyed equipment used for the assembly of the Me 262 jet fighter, delaying its introduction into service.

On 14 October 1943, the squadron carried out an attack on the ball bearing factories at Schweinfurt, braving unrelenting attacks by enemy fighters, despite which, the 390th Group had the highest accuracy of the attacking force. For this mission it received a second DUC. In late February 1944, the squadron participated in Big Week, the concentrated assault on Germany's aircraft manufacturing industry, including plants manufacturing aircraft instruments and depots for aviation supplies. Other strategic targets included attacks on navy bases at Bremen, bridges at Cologne, marshalling yards at Frankfurt am Main, factories at Mannheim, synthetic oil plants at Merseburg, oil refineries at Zeitz.

The squadron was occasionally diverted from the strategic bombing campaign to fly air support and interdiction missions. It bombed near Caen fifteen minutes before the first landings on the Normandy coast on D Day. It provided support during Operation Cobra, the breakout at Saint Lo in late July 1944. During the Battle of the Bulge from December 1944 through January 1945, it cut German supply lines to the battle area. It attacked Axis air bases to support Operation Varsity, the airborne assault across the Rhine, in March 1945. The squadron flew its last combat mission on 20 April 1945.

==== Return to the United States and inactivation ====
Just prior to and after V-E Day, the squadron dropped food supplies to civilians in the Netherlands. The squadron's aircraft began returning to the United States on 25 June 1945, while the ground echelon sailed on the RMS Queen Elizabeth in early August. The squadron reassembled at Sioux Falls Army Air Field, South Dakota later that month and was inactivated there on 28 August 1945.

=== Reserve operations ===
The squadron was activated in the reserve at Lowry Field, Colorado, where it trained under the supervision of Air Defense Command (ADC)'s 138th AAF Base Unit (Reserve Training) (later the 2468th Air Force Reserve Training Center). It is not clear to what degree the squadron was staffed or equipped while a reserve unit. In 1948 Continental Air Command (ConAC) assumed responsibility for managing reserve and Air National Guard units from ADC. President Truman’s reduced 1949 defense budget required reductions in the number of units in the Air Force, The 568th was inactivated in June 1949 as reserve flying operations at Lowry came to an end.

=== Intercontinental ballistic missiles ===
The squadron was redesignated the 568th Strategic Missile Squadron, organized at Larson Air Force Base, Washington on 1 April 1961 and assigned to the 4170th Strategic Wing. The squadron was equipped with SM-68 Titan I intercontinental ballistic missiles. When the squadron was declared operational on 28 December 1962, the deployment of the Titan I was complete.

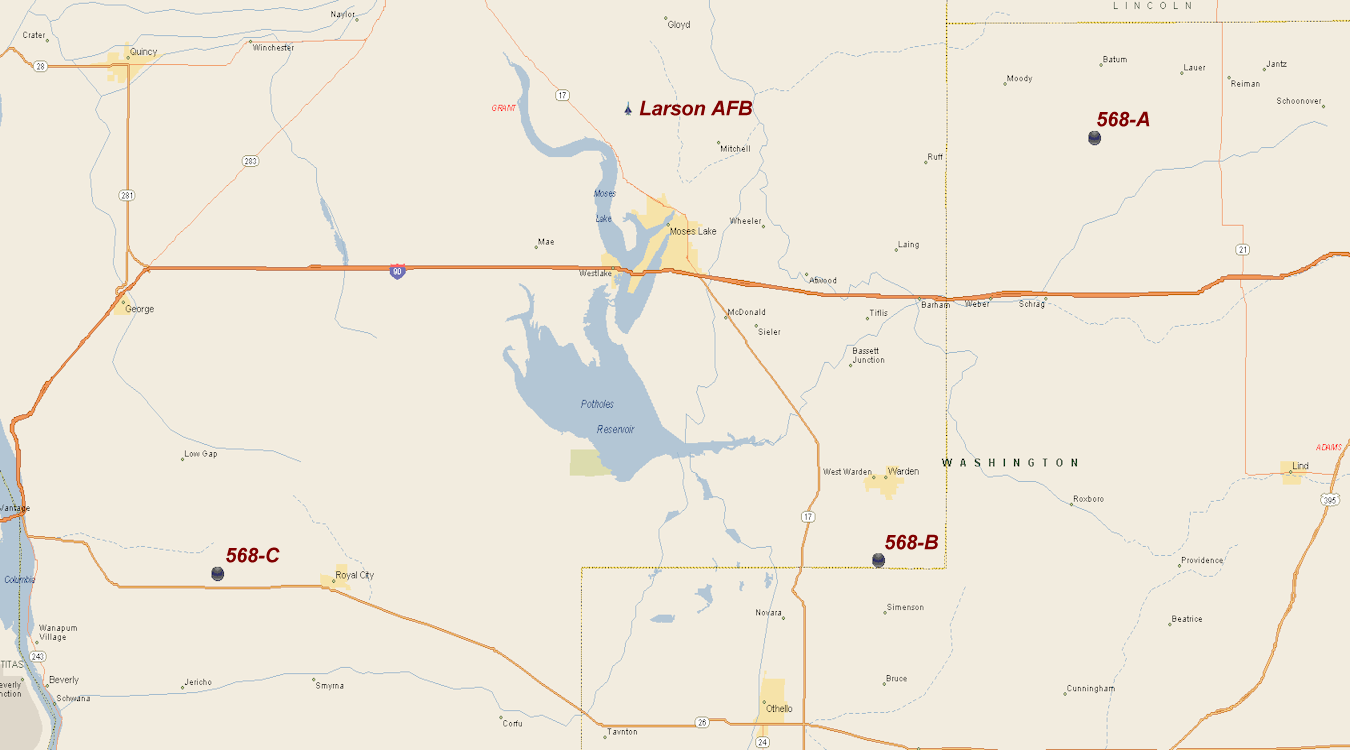
SM-68 Titan I Missile Sites

The squadron was deployed in a 3x3 configuration, which meant a total of nine missiles were divided into three sites. Each site had three ICBMs ready to launch at any given time. Its three missile sites were:

568-A, 8 miles N of Schrag, Washington 47°11′16″N 118°49′22″W
568-B, 4 miles SSW of Warden, Washington 46°55′00″N 119°03′17″W
568-C, 6 miles SE of Frenchman Hills, Washington 46°54′26″N 119°45′19″W

In May 1963, Headquarters USAF decided that Titan I missiles were to be phased out between 1965 and 1968. One year later, Secretary of Defense Robert McNamara directed the acceleration of this program to remove these missiles prior to the end of Fiscal Year 1965 and in November 1964, announced this publicly. The squadron's first Titan Is were taken off alert on 4 January 1965 and the squadron was inactivated on 25 March 1965.

== Lineage ==
- Constituted as the 568th Bombardment Squadron (Heavy) on 15 January 1943

Activated on 26 January 1943
Redesignated 568th Bombardment Squadron, Heavy c. 20 August 1943
Inactivated on 28 August 1945

- Redesignated 568th Bombardment Squadron, Very Heavy on 28 January 1947

Activated in the reserve on 27 February 1947
Inactivated on 27 June 1949

- Redesignated 568th Strategic Missile Squadron and activated on 24 October 1960 (not organized)

Organized on 1 April 1961
Inactivated on 25 March 1965

=== Assignments ===
- 390th Bombardment Group, 26 January 1943 – 28 August 1945
- Second Air Force, 27 February 1947
- Tenth Air Force, 1 July 1948 – 27 June 1949
- Strategic Air Command, 24 October 1960 (not organized)
- 4170th Strategic Wing, 1 April 1961
- 462d Strategic Aerospace Wing, 1 February 1963 – 25 March 1965

=== Stations ===
- Geiger Field, Washington, 26 January 1943
- Great Falls Army Air Base, Montana, 6 June-5 July 1943
- RAF Framlingham (AAF-153), England, 26 July 1943 – 6 August 1945
- Sioux Falls Army Air Field, South Dakota, 14–28 August 1945
- Lowry Field (later Lowry Air Force Base), Colorado, 27 February 1947 – 27 June 1949
- Larson Air Force Base, Washington, 1 April 1961 – 25 March 1965

=== Aircraft and missiles ===
- B-17 Flying Fortress, 1943–1945
- SM-68 Titan I (later HGN-25A), 1961–1965

== Awards and campaigns ==
Award streamer	Award	Dates	Notes
	Distinguished Unit Citation	17 August 1943	Germany 568th Bombardment Squadron
	Distinguished Unit Citation	14 October 1943	Germany 568th Bombardment Squadron

Campaign Streamer	Campaign	Dates	Notes
	Air Offensive, Europe	26 July 1943 – 5 June 1944	568th Bombardment Squadron
	Air Combat, EAME Theater	26 July 1943 – 11 May 1945	568th Bombardment Squadron
	Normandy	6 June 1944 – 24 July 1944	568th Bombardment Squadron
	Northern France	25 July 1944 – 14 September 1944	568th Bombardment Squadron
	Rhineland	15 September 1944 – 21 March 1945	568th Bombardment Squadron
	Ardennes-Alsace	16 December 1944 – 25 January 1945	568th Bombardment Squadron
	Central Europe	22 March 1944 – 21 May 1945	568th Bombardment Squadron

== See also ==
- List of United States Air Force missile squadrons
- B-17 Flying Fortress units of the United States Army Air Forces
