= 392d Combat Training Squadron =

Former U.S. Air Force ICBM squadron

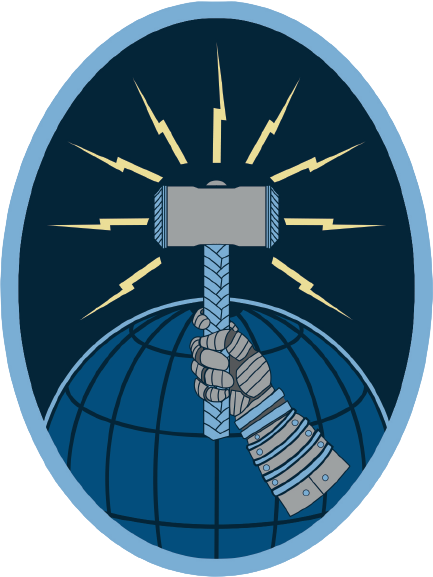
- Active: 1943-1944, 1957–1959, 1961–1963, 1993–present
- Country: United States
- Branch: United States Space Force
- Role: intercontinental ballistic missile training
- Part of: Space Training and Readiness Command
- Garrison/HQ: Schriever Space Force Base, Colorado
- Nickname: Thor Warriors
- Colors: Blue and Yellow
- Mascot: Thor
- Decorations: Air Force Outstanding Unit Award

Commanders
- Current commander: Lt Col Bryce Carlson

Insignia
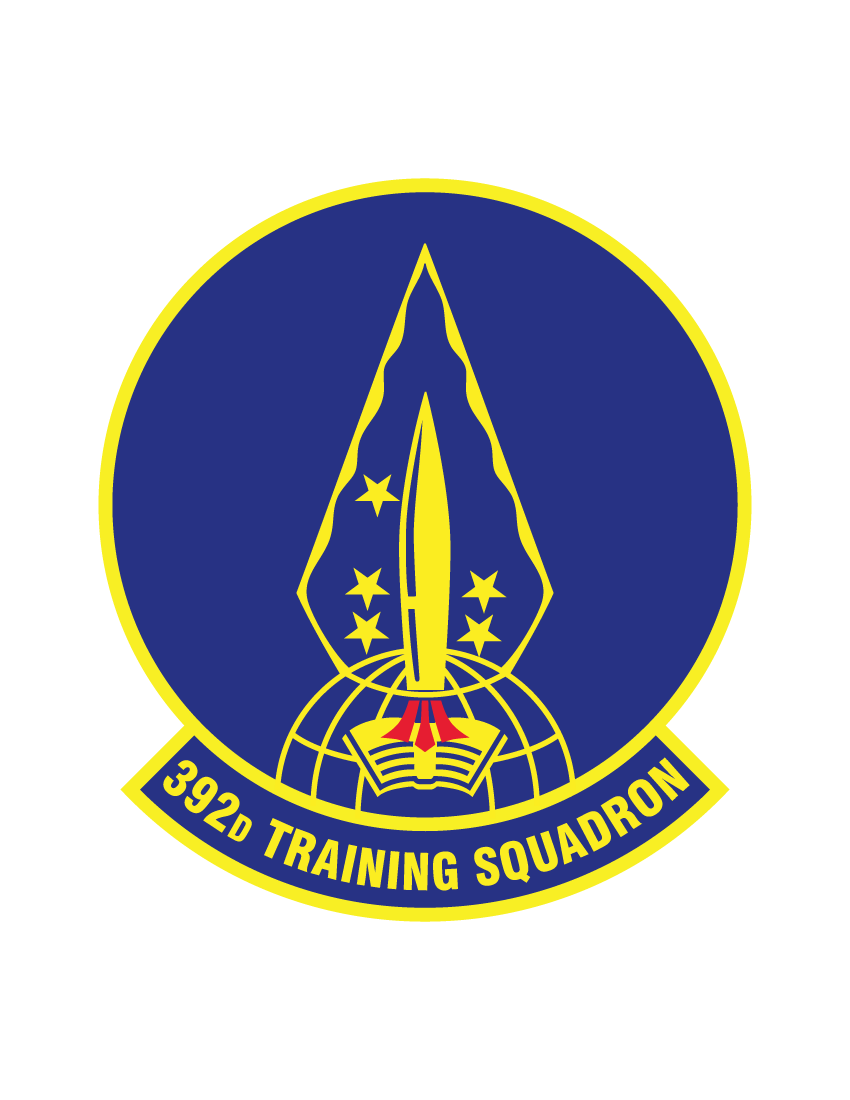
- 392d Training Squadron emblem

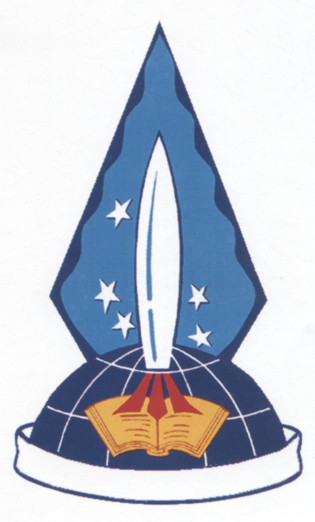
- 392d Missile Training Squadron emblem (Note: Approved 12 May 1959.)

The 392d Combat Training Squadron is a unit of the United States Space Force stationed at Schriever Space Force Base and was previously an intercontinental ballistic missile training unit at Vandenberg Air Force Base, California. Its first predecessor was the 592d Bombardment Squadron, which trained aircrews on Boeing B-17 Flying Fortresses during World War II. Its second predecessor was the 392d Missile Training Squadron, which conducted training, primarily for Royal Air Force launch crews, on the PGM-17 Thor missile at Vandenberg from 1958 to 1963. The two squadrons were consolidated in 1985 and activated again in 1993 to train missile crews at Vandenberg. The squadron was inactivated in 2010.

== History ==
The 392d Training Squadron traces its lineage through two different units, the 592nd Bombardment Squadron (Heavy) and the 392nd Missile Training Squadron.

=== World War II bomber crew training ===
The 592d Bombardment Squadron was first activated at Mountain Home Army Air Field, Idaho on 16 February 1943 as one of the four original squadrons of the 396th Bombardment Group. After initial organization and equipping with Boeing B-17 Flying Fortress heavy bombers, the squadron moved to Moses Lake Army Air Base, Washington. There the squadron acted as an Operational Training Unit (OTU) for B-17 units. The OTU program was patterned after the unit training system of the Royal Air Force. It involved the use of an oversized parent unit to provide cadres to "satellite groups". It assumed responsibility for their training and oversaw their expansion with graduates of Army Air Forces Training Command schools to become effective combat units. Phase I training concentrated on individual training in crewmember specialties. Phase II training emphasized the coordination for the crew to act as a team. The final phase concentrated on operation as a unit.

In August 1943, the unit's mission changed to being a Replacement Training Unit (RTU). By this time most combat units had been activated and many of them had deployed overseas. With the exception of special programs, like forming Boeing B-29 Superfortress units, training "fillers" for existing units became more important than unit training. Like OTUs, RTUs were an oversized units. Their mission, however was to train individual pilots or aircrews.

In November 1943, the 592d moved to Drew Field, Florida, where it would remain for the duration of its active service. However, the Army Air Forces was finding that standard military units, based on relatively inflexible tables of organization were not well adapted to the training mission. Accordingly it adopted a more functional system in which each base was organized into a separate numbered unit. The 592d was inactivated on 1 May 1944 at Drew Field, Florida. Its personnel and equipment became part of the 326th AAF Base Unit.

=== Thor missile training ===
The 392d Missile Training Squadron was activated at Cooke Air Force Base, California on 15 September 1957. The unit conducted training on SM-75 Thor intermediate range ballistic missiles. Although developed and manufactured in the United States, the only operator of the Thor missile was the Royal Air Force (RAF) and training for Thor operations and maintenance was primarily provided for RAF personnel. The squadron was inactivated on 1 February 1963, as the RAF wound down its Thor program.

In September 1985, the 592d Bombardment Squadron and the 392d Missile Training Squadron were consolidated as the 392d Tactical Missile Squadron, but the consolidated unit was never active under that designation.

=== 392d Training Squadron ===
On 19 September 1985, the 592d Bombardment Squadron was consolidated with the 392d Missile Training Squadron (IRBM). This new unit, the 92d Tactical Missile Squadron, was not activated. Instead, it remained inactive until 1 July 1993, when it was redesignated the 392d Space and Missile Training Squadron and activated at Vandenberg Air Force Base, California. On 1 April 1994, the unit was redesignated the 392d Training Squadron. Since its activation, the 392d has been responsible for initial qualification training, specialty code-awarding courses for Minuteman and Peacekeeper ICBM crews, as well as basic mission orientation and refresher training for Air Force Space Command commanders and staff. Due to restructuring as a result of the creation of Global Strike Command, the 392d shifted its training responsibilities to only training Missile Operators.

On 13 July 2012 the 392nd was inactivated. Its mission was absorbed by the 532nd Training Squadron to streamline operations and effectiveness.

=== 392d Combat Training Squadron ===
After the United States Space Force was formed, it established STAR Delta (Provisional), Operating Location A. On 23 August 2021, The 392d Combat Training Squadron was activated at Schriever Space Force Base under Space Delta 11 to replace it. The squadron joined the 705th Combat Training Squadron to conduct Exercise Virtual Flag 22-1 at the squadron's Distributed Mission Operations Center – Space in November 2021.

== Lineage ==
592d Bombardment Squadron

- Constituted as the 592 Bombardment Squadron (Heavy) on 29 January 1943

Activated on 16 February 1943
Inactivated on 1 May 1944
Consolidated with the 392d Missile Training Squadron as the 92d Tactical Missile Squadron on 19 Sep 1985

392d Combat Training Squadron

- Constituted as the 392d Missile Training Squadron on 20 May 1957

Activated on 15 September 1957
Redesignated 392d Missile Training Squadron (IRBM) on 1 April 1958
Discontinued and inactivated on 1 February 1963
Consolidated with the 592d Bombardment Squadron as the 92d Tactical Missile Squadron on 19 September 1985

- Redesignated 392d Space and Missile Training Squadron on 1 July 1993

Activated on 1 July 1993
Redesignated 392d Training Squadron on 1 April 1994
Inactivated 1 July 2012

- Redesignated 392d Combat Training Squadron on 19 August 2021

Converted to a unit of the United States Space Force and activated on 23 August 2021

=== Assignments ===
- 396th Bombardment Group, 16 February 1943 – 1 May 1944
- 704th Strategic Missile Wing, 15 September 1957 (attached to 1st Missile Division after 6 April 1959)
- 1st Missile Division (later 1 Strategic Aerospace Division), 1 July 1959
- 392d Strategic Missile Wing, 18 October 1961
- 1st Strategic Aerospace Division, 19 December 1961 – 1 February 1963
- 17th Technical Training Group, 1 July 1993
- Second Air Force, 1 April 1994
- 381st Training Group, 1 October 1994 – 1 July 2012
- Space Delta 1, 23 August 2021 – present

=== Stations ===
- Mountain Home Army Air Field, Idaho, 16 February 1943
- Moses Lake Army Air Base, Washington, 10 April 1943
- Drew Field, Florida, 6 November 1943 – 1 May 1944
- Cooke Air Force Base (later Vandenberg Air Force Base, California, 15 September 1957 – 1 February 1963
- Vandenberg Air Force Base, California, 1 July 1993 – 1 July 2012
- Schriever Space Force Base, Colorado, 23 August 2021 – present

=== Aircraft and missiles ===
- Boeing B-17 Flying Fortress, 1943-1944
- SM-75 (later PGM-17) Thor, 1958-1962

=== Campaign ===
Campaign Streamer	Campaign	Dates	Notes
	American Theater without inscription	19 January 1943 – 1 May 1944	592d Bombardment Squadron

== List of commanders ==
- Lt Col Albert Harris, September 2021 – June 2023
- Lt Col Scott Nakatani, June 2023 – June 2025
- Lt Col Bryce Carlson, June 2025 - Present
