= 705th Combat Training Squadron =

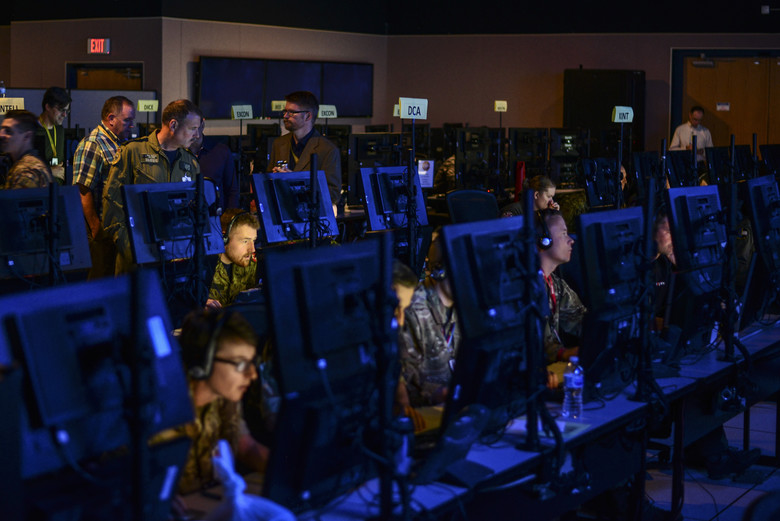
- Participants in Virtual Flag 19-4 at Kirtland AFB
- Active: 2003–present
- Country: United States
- Branch: United States Air Force
- Role: Virtual exercise and training management
- Size: 175 military and contractor
- Part of: Air Combat Command
- Garrison/HQ: Kirtland AFB, New Mexico
- Decorations: Air Force Outstanding Unit Award

Insignia
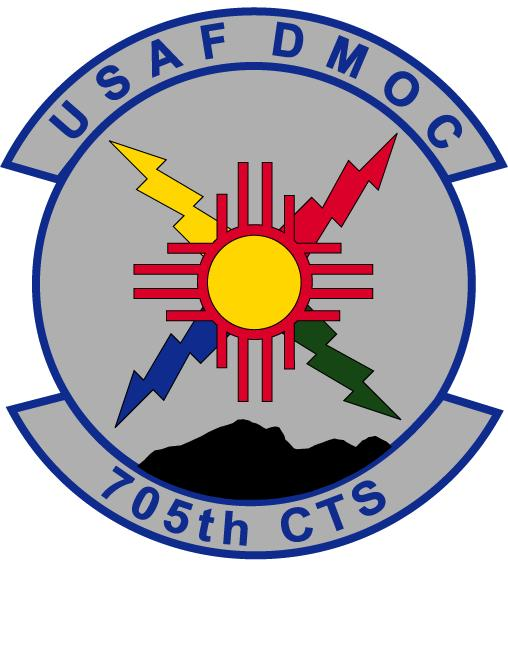
- 705th Combat Training Squadron emblem (Approved 15 March 2004)

The 705th Combat Training Squadron is a United States Air Force unit located at Kirtland Air Force Base, New Mexico. It is assigned to the 505th Combat Training Group and conducts live, virtual, constructive exercises at all levels of operation.

== Function ==
The 705th Combat Training Squadron is home to the Distributed Mission Operations Center. The Distributed Mission Operations Center is Air Combat Command's tactical to operational level synthetic battlespace hub.

It consists of 175 Air Force military, government civilian and contractor personnel with backgrounds ranging from air battle managers, pilots, weapons system operators, intelligence, program managers and engineers.

The squadron's Operating Location A was located at the previous-Schriever Air Force Base, Colorado, where it operates the Distributed Mission Operations Center-Space. It manages Space Flag exercises and was scheduled to transfer to the United States Space Force. In late 2021, Operating Location A became the 392d Combat Training Squadron of the U.S. Space Force, at the renamed Schriever Space Force Base.

== History ==
The origins of the squadron go back to 1979 as an Office of the Secretary of Defense effort to address air defense issues in Central Europe. During the 1990s its focus shifted to joint theater missile defense leading up to the establishment of a full spectrum Distributed Mission Operations capability. The effort was transferred to the 705th Exercise Control Squadron, which was renamed the 705th Combat Training Squadron in 2006.

The squadron manages Virtual Flag theater-level exercises, conducted in a simulated virtual reality world to practice techniques, procedures and tactics all the way from the Joint Terminal Attack Controllers to the Joint Force Air Component Commander. These exercises take place in a virtual and simulated world with environment generators that replicate the exact threats being faced.

== Lineage ==
- Constituted as the 705th Exercise Control Squadron

Activated prior to June 2003
Redesignated 705th Combat Training Squadron in 2006

=== Assignments ===
- 505th Test and Evaluation Group

=== Stations ===
- Kirtland Air Force Base, New Mexico, by 2003 – present

=== Component ===
- Operating Location A

Schriever Air Force Base, Colorado

=== Awards ===
Award streamer	Award	Dates	Notes
	Air Force Outstanding Unit Award	1 June 2003-31 May 2005	705th Exercise Control Squadron
	Air Force Outstanding Unit Award	1 June 2004-31 May 2006	705th Combat Training Squadron
	Air Force Outstanding Unit Award	1 June 2006-31 May 2007	705th Combat Training Squadron
	Air Force Outstanding Unit Award	1 June 2012-31 May 2014	705th Combat Training Squadron
	Air Force Outstanding Unit Award	1 June 2014-31 May 2015	705th Combat Training Squadron
	Air Force Outstanding Unit Award	1 June 2017-31 May 2019	705th Combat Training Squadron
