= 966th Airborne Air Control Squadron =

966th Airborne Air Control Squadron

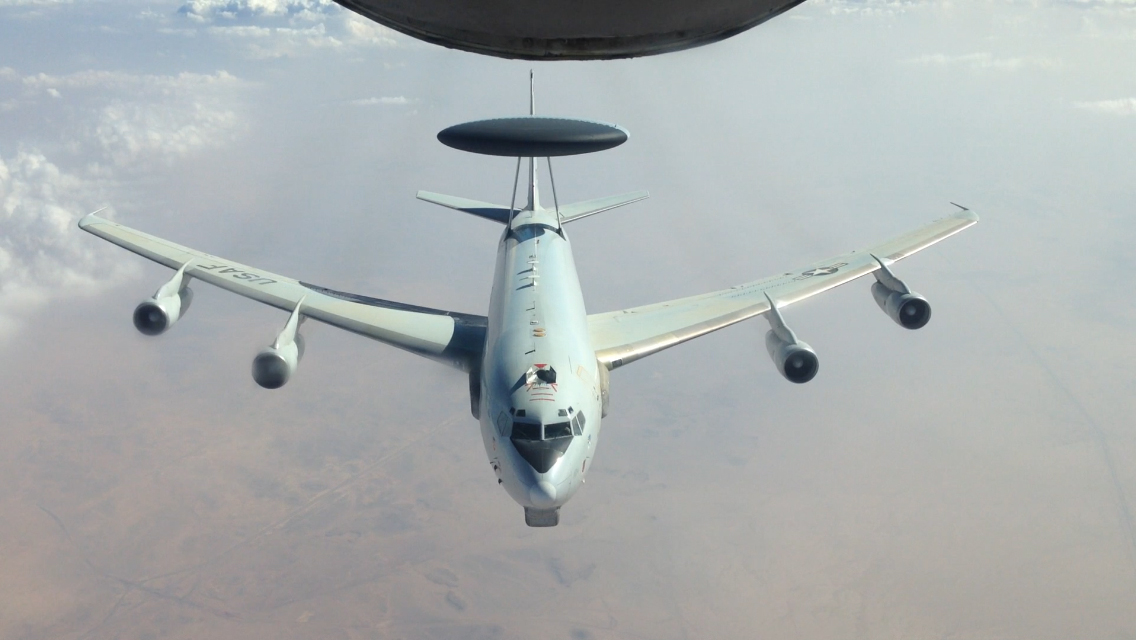
- 552d Air Control Wing Boeing E-3 Sentry
- Active: 1942–1944; 1944–1945; 1961–1969; 1976–present
- Country: United States
- Branch: United States Air Force
- Role: Airborne command and control training
- Size: 180 personnel
- Part of: Air Combat Command
- Garrison/HQ: Tinker Air Force Base
- Motto: Protection by Professionals (1963-1989)
- Engagements: China-Burma-India Theater
- Decorations: Air Force Outstanding Unit Award with Combat "V" Device; Air Force Meritorious Unit Award; Air Force Outstanding Unit Award; Republic of Vietnam Gallantry Cross with Palm

Commanders
- Current commander: Lt Col Asif Kausar

Insignia
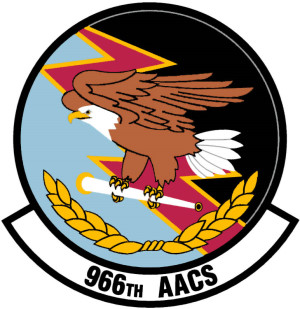
- 966th Airborne Air Control Squadron emblem (Note: Approved 14 May 1989. Description: Per bend Celeste and Sable a lightning flash issuant from base bendwise throughout Gules fimbriated Or surmounted by an eagle proper and grasping in both feet a telescope Argent garnished Yellow above a wreath of laurel of the last [color mentioned]; all within a diminished bordure of the second [color mentioned]. Significance: The eagle in flight represents the organization, the telescope refers to its aerial long-range detection capabilities, the blue and black background indicate its day and night around-the-clock vigilance, and the red lightning flash alludes to the swiftness, sureness and power of airborne warning and control. The gold laurel branches (wreath) are symbolic of honor, triumph and fame.)

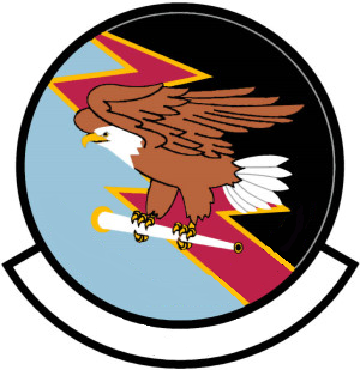
- 966th Airborne Early Warning & Control Squadron emblem (Note: Approved 14 June 1963. The 1989 revision added a laurel wreath)

The 966th Airborne Air Control Squadron is an active United States Air Force unit assigned to the 552d Air Control Wing at Tinker Air Force Base, Oklahoma. It operates the Boeing E-3 Sentry Airborne Warning and Control System aircraft conducting training of crews in airborne command and control missions.

The squadron's first predecessor is the 466th Bombardment Squadron which served during World War II as an Operational Training Unit, and later as a Replacement Training Unit. It was inactivated in the spring of 1944 in a general reorganization of Army Air Forces support and training units in the United States.

The second predecessor of the squadron was organized in India as the 166th Liaison Squadron. It provided light transport, observation, and aeromedical evacuation support for Allied forces fighting in Burma. Following V-J Day, it returned to the United States for inactivation.

The 966th Airborne Early Warning and Control Squadron was organized in 1962 to provide seaward radar coverage in the Gulf of Mexico and Caribbean Sea. It also supported Lockheed U-2 Dragon Lady missions over Cuba and NASA rocket recovery. After 1965, it deployed aircrews to Viet Nam and Thailand to provide radar coverage over North Viet Nam. The squadron was inactivated at the end of 1969.

== Mission ==
The squadron is the Boeing E-3 Sentry formal training unit (FTU) for all Airborne Warning and Control System aircrew.

It is Air Combat Command's largest flying training unit, training all active duty and Air Force Reserve Command E-3 pilots and mission crew, training approximately 500 initial qualification students every year. It provides the combat Air Force with airborne systems and personnel for surveillance, warning and control of strategic, tactical, and special mission forces. It also provides upgrade training to approximately 200 students annually. With its initial and upgrade training for various crew positions it teaches 30 different courses.

In addition to its training mission, the squadron maintains its personnel and equipment in readiness for dispersal and augmentation of tactical forces worldwide.

== Organization ==
The squadron has 180 personnel assigned, not counting trainees.

Until January 2020, the squadron used planes assigned to other squadrons of the 552d Air Control Wing, when it received a dedicated E-3 Sentry. This number had increased to four aircraft by 2023. The squadron also trains with the use of simulators

== History ==
=== World War II ===
==== Bomber training ====
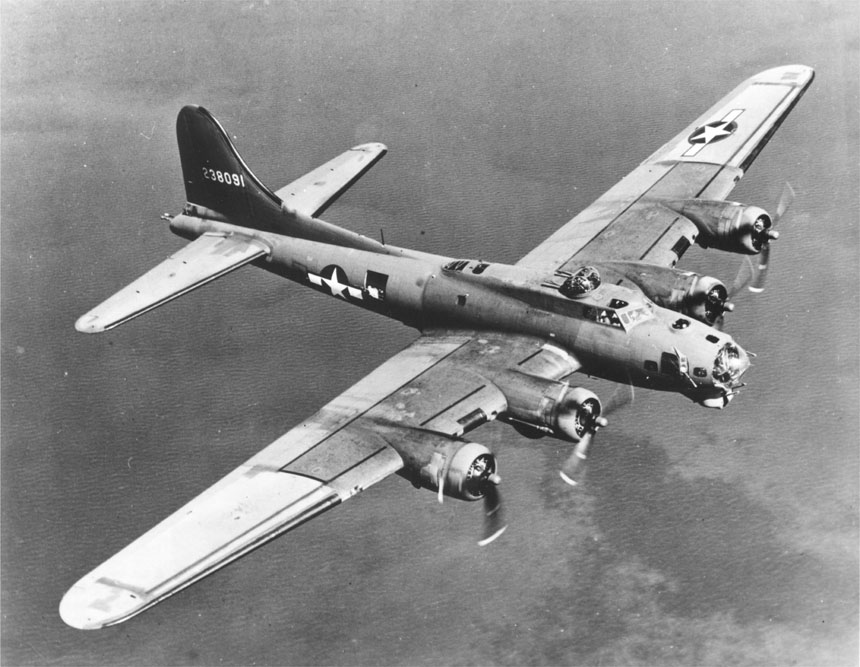
B-17 Flying Fortress of a training unit

The first predecessor of the squadron, the 466th Bombardment Squadron was activated on 15 July 1942 at Topeka Army Air Base, Kansas (Note: Per AFHRA Fact Sheet. However, Maurer states the squadron was activated at Salt Lake City Army Air Base, Utah, and moved to Topeka in August when it began operations.) as one of the four original squadrons of the 333d Bombardment Group. In August, it began operating as an Operational Training Unit (OTU) for Boeing B-17 Flying Fortress units. The OTU program involved the use of an oversized parent unit to provide cadres to "satellite groups" The OTU program was patterned after the unit training system of the Royal Air Force. The parent assumed responsibility for satellite unit training and oversaw their expansion with graduates of Army Air Forces Training Command schools to become effective combat units. Phase I training concentrated on individual training in crewmember specialties. Phase II training emphasized the coordination for the crew to act as a team. The final phase concentrated on operation as a unit. Later that year, the squadron traded its Flying Fortresses for Consolidated B-24 Liberators.

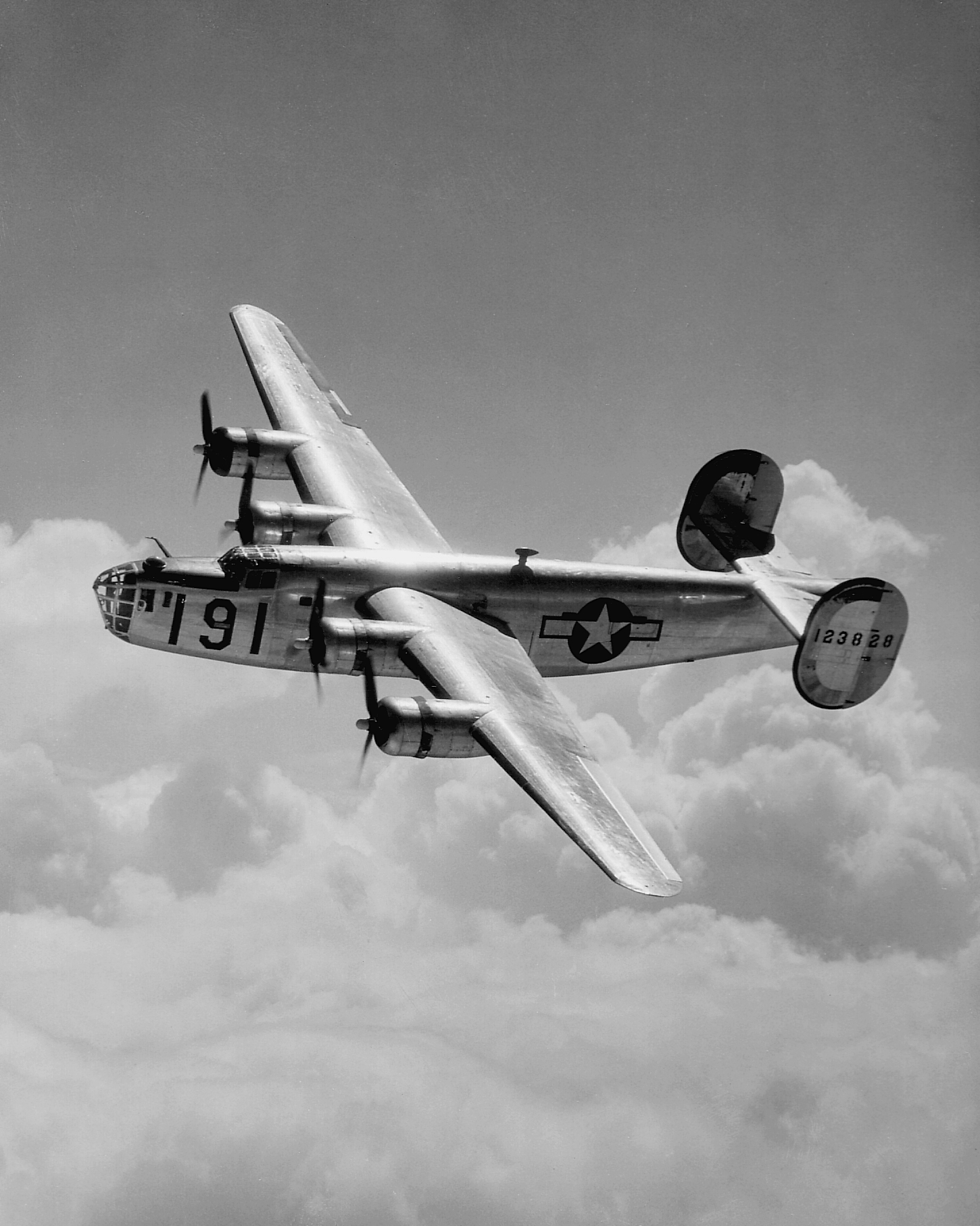
B-24 Liberator of a training unit

In February 1943, the squadron moved to Dalhart Army Air Field, Texas. However, many of the Army Air Forces' bomber units had been activated. With the exception of special programs, like forming Boeing B-29 Superfortress units, training “fillers” for existing units became more important than unit training. The squadron mission changed to becoming a Replacement Training Unit (RTU). RTUs were also oversized units, but their mission was to train individual pilots or aircrews. It continued this mission through November 1943.

The AAF was finding that standard military units like the 466th, whose manning was based on relatively inflexible tables of organization were proving not well adapted to the training mission, even more so to the replacement mission. Accordingly, the Army Air Forces adopted a more functional system in which each base was organized into a separate numbered unit. The 466th and other training and support units at Dalhart were disbanded or inactivated on 1 April 1944 and replaced by the 232d AAF Base Unit. In 1985, the squadron was consolidated with the active 966th Airborne Warning and Control Training Squadron.

==== Special operations ====
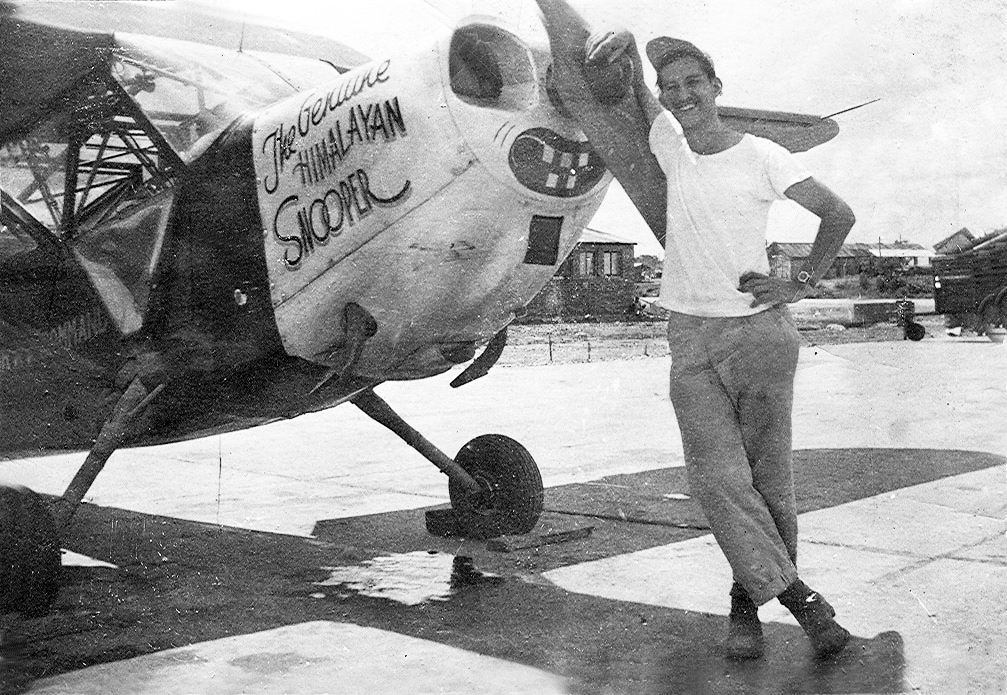
L-5 in the CBI Theater

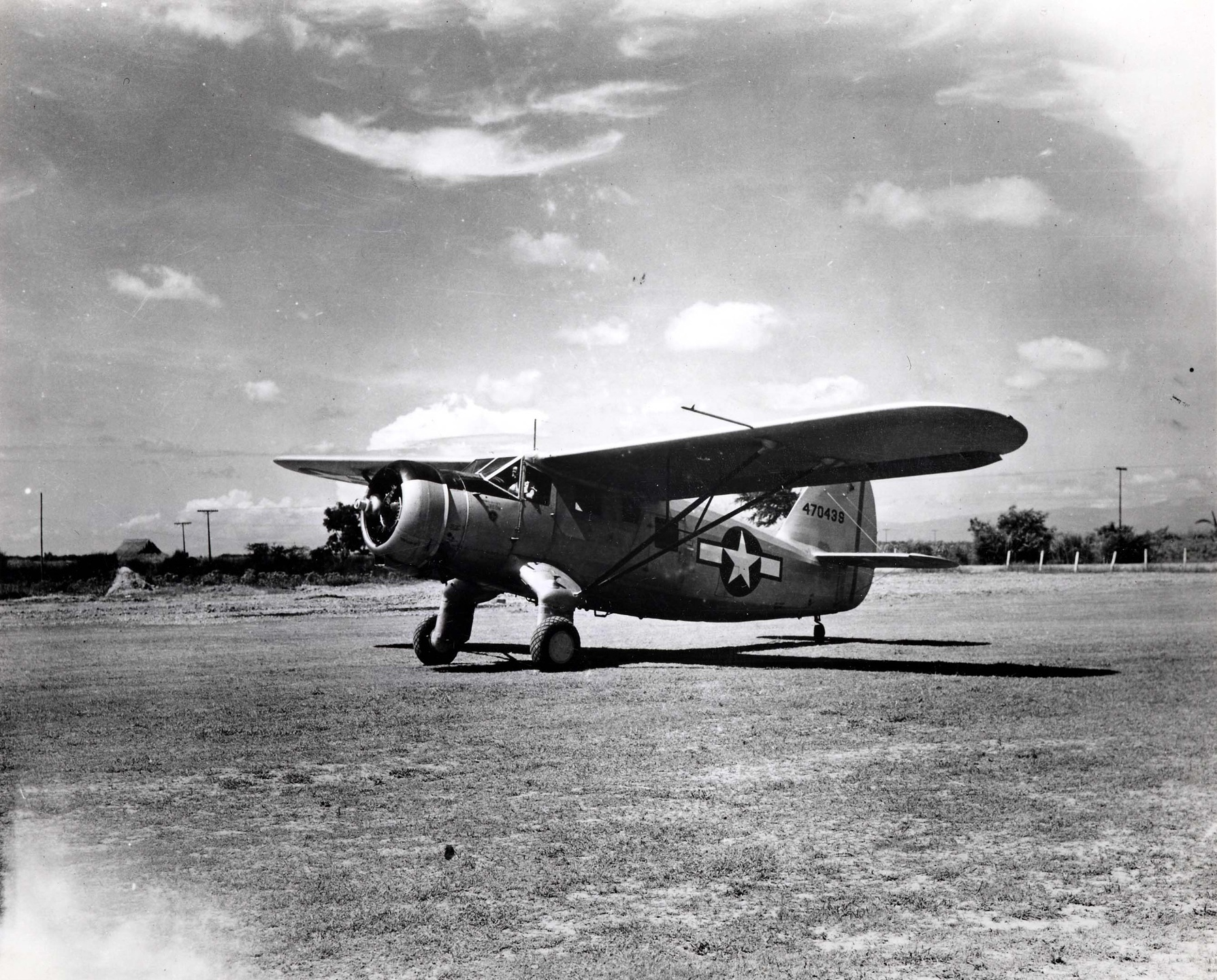
UC-64A Norseman of an air commando group

The squadron's second predecessor, the 166th Liaison Squadron, was activated at Burnpur Airfield, India on 3 September 1944, when the 1st Air Commando Group reorganized its light plane and light cargo sections into three liaison squadrons. It moved to Yazagyo Airfield, Burma in November 1944 and began operations with its Stinson L-5 Sentinels and Noorduyn C-64 Norseman. It flew aeromedical evacuation missions and provided light transport services for ground forces in Burma until May 1945, when it was withdrawn to Burnpur Airfield.

After V-J Day, the squadron remained in India until October 1945. It returned to the United States and upon arrival at the Port of Embarkation was inactivated at Camp Kilmer, New Jersey on 3 November 1945. In 1985, the squadron was consolidated with the active 966th Airborne Warning and Control Training Squadron.

=== Airborne warning and control ===
==== Operations from Florida ====
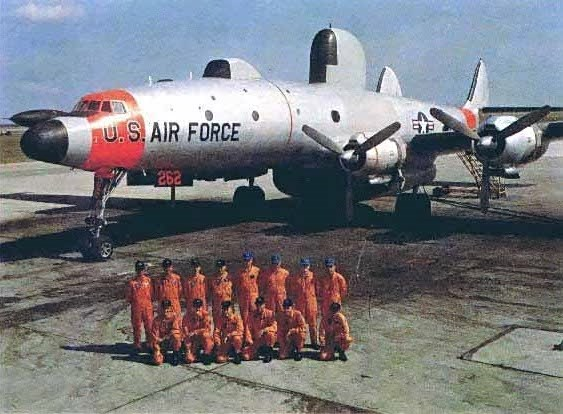
EC-121H Warning Star and crew (Note: Aircraft is Lockheed EC-121H-LO Warning Star, serial 55-5262. Originally built for the US Navy as Lockheed WV, then transferred to the US Air Force. on 11 November 1966, this aircraft suffered engine failure and crashed, killing all 19 crewmembers aboard. Baugher, Joe (27 July 2023). "1955 USAF Serial Numbers". Joe Baugher.)

In the 1950s, Air Defense Command established the 551st Airborne Early Warning and Control Wing to extend air defense radar coverage and fighter control seaward over the Atlantic beyond the range of shore based radars. Once Cuba was no longer a friendly power, similar coverage was extended over the Gulf of Mexico and adjacent waters. The 551st Wing began sending crews to McCoy Air Force Base, Florida on temporary duty to provide this coverage. The 966th Airborne Early Warning and Control Squadron was organized on 1 February 1962 at McCoy to provide the coverage on a permanent basis. The squadron was equipped with Lockheed EC-121D Warning Stars, which were in the process of being upgraded to EC-121Hs, which were equipped with a data processor that enabled aircraft on station to feed radar data directly to Semi Automatic Ground Environment control centers. Initially, the squadron also operated the Lockheed TC-121 Constellation for training aircrews.

When flying active air defense patrols, the squadron's aircraft came under the operational control of the Montgomery Air Defense Sector. The sector was inactivated in April 1966, and control was exercised by the 32nd Air Division. In addition to its primary active air defense mission, the squadron assisted with antisubmarine patrols and developed weather information in its area of operations. It occasionally supported Strategic Air Command and Military Airlift Command operations. It supported NASA by tracking rocket boosters as they fell back into the ocean after test launches.

Later the squadron added three EC-121Q aircraft, which were used for Operation Gold Digger missions. Gold Digger missions monitored and tracked Lockheed U-2 Dragon Lady photographic reconnaissance missions over Cuba. These missions were flown at very low altitude off the Florida Keys, tracking the path of the U-2 they were supporting. The low altitude permitted the radar signals (the search radar was under the EC-121 fuselage) to "bounce" off the surface of the water and detect the high altitude U-2s.

During the Cuban Missile Crisis, the squadron was reinforced on 20 October 1962 by six EC-121s deployed from the 552d Airborne Early Warning and Control Wing at McClellan Air Force Base, California. Along with the deployment of Navy Grumman WF-2s to Key West Naval Air Station, this enabled the maintenance of three separate airborne warning tracks off southern Florida, rather than the single orbit usually maintained. On 3 December, the forces augmenting the 966th were released and the squadron resumed its normal posture. The squadron was reassigned to the 552d Wing in May 1963.

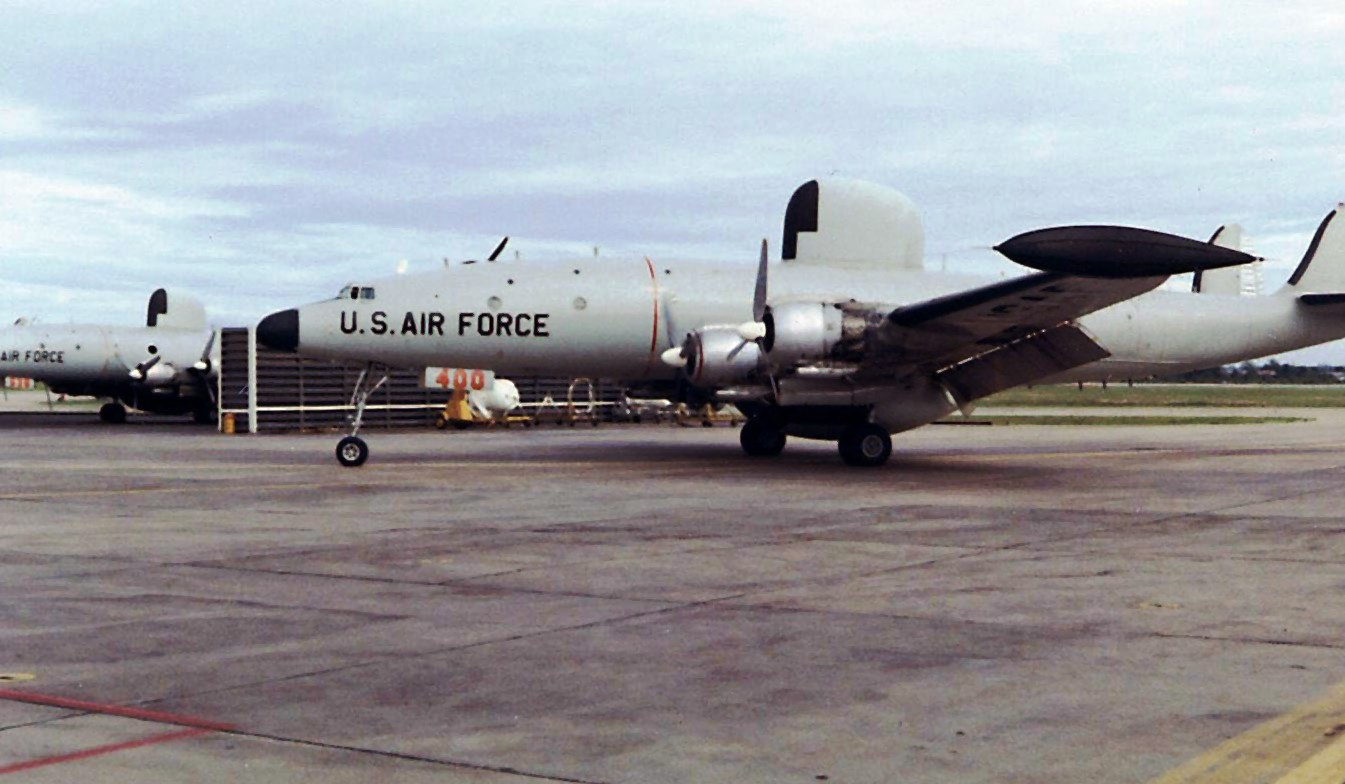
College Eye EC-121D at Korat RTAFB in 1968

Beginning in April 1965, the squadron rotated aircrews to Southeast Asia to support the Big Eye (later College Eye) Task Force. The task force was located at Tan Son Nhut Airport, Viet Nam until 1967, when it moved to Korat Royal Thai Air Force Base, Thailand. Its EC-121Ds provided radar coverage for United States forces over North Viet Nam from orbits flown over Laos and the Gulf of Tonkin.

In July 1969, the squadron was returned to the control of the 551st Wing. It was inactivated along with the wing on 31 December 1969.

==== Aircrew training ====
The 966th was redesignated the 966th Airborne Warning and Control Training Squadron and activated at Tinker Air Force Base, Oklahoma on 1 May 1976. The 966th began training aircrews in 1977. For its first two years, a former Boeing WC-135 Constant Phoenix atmospheric sampling aircraft was modified back to C-135C configuration and used as a proficiency training aircraft and for support. (Note: The plane was later modified back to the WC-135 configuration. Archer.) In addition to its assigned E-3s, the squadron has also operated two civilian Boeing 707s to train flight crews.

In December 1983, academic training was split off from the squadron with the formation of the 552nd Training Squadron, which also serves as the administrative unit for students in initial and upgrade training. It was redesignated the 966th Airborne Air Control Squadron in July 1994, although its mission did not change.

== Lineage ==
466th Bombardment Squadron

- Constituted as the 466th Bombardment Squadron (Heavy) on 9 July 1942

Activated on 15 July 1942
Inactivated on 1 April 1944

- Consolidated with the 166th Liaison Squadron and the 966th Airborne Warning and Control Training Squadron as the 966th Airborne Warning and Control Training Squadron on 19 September 1985

166th Liaison Squadron

- Constituted as the 166th Liaison Squadron (Commando) on 9 August 1944

Activated on 3 September 1944
Inactivated on 3 November 1945

- Consolidated with the 466th Bombardment Squadron and the 966th Airborne Warning and Control Training Squadron as the 966th Airborne Warning and Control Training Squadron on 19 September 1985

966th Airborne Air Control Squadron

- Constituted as the 966th Airborne Early Warning and Control Squadron and activated on 18 December 1961 (not organized)

Organized on 1 February 1962
Inactivated on 31 December 1969
Redesignated 966th Airborne Warning and Control Training Squadron on 5 May 1976
Activated on 1 July 1976

- Consolidated with the 166th Liaison Squadron and the 466th Bombardment Squadron on 19 September 1985

Redesignated 966th Airborne Air Control Squadron on 1 July 1994

=== Assignments ===
- 333d Bombardment Group, 15 July 1942 – 1 April 1944
- 1st Air Commando Group, 3 September 1944 – 3 November 1945
- Air Defense Command, 18 December 1961 (not organized)
- 551st Airborne Early Warning and Control Wing, 1 February 1962
- 552d Airborne Early Warning and Control Wing, 1 May 1963
- 551st Airborne Early Warning and Control Wing, 1 July 1969
- 552d Airborne Early Warning and Control Wing, 15 November-31 December 1969
- 552d Airborne Warning and Control Wing (later 552d Airborne Warning and Control Division; 552d Airborne Warning and Control Wing; 552d Air Control Wing), 1 July 1976
- 552d Operations Group, 29 May 1992
- 552d Training Group, c. 17 August 2018 – present

=== Stations ===
- Topeka Army Air Base, Kansas, 15 July 1942
- Dalhart Army Air Field, Texas, 22 February 1943 – 1 April 1944
- Burnpur Airfield, India, 3 September 1944
- Yazagyo Airfield, Burma, 13 November 1944
- Inbaung Airfield, Burma, 12 December 1944
- Burnpur Airfield, India, 19 December 1944 (detachment operated from Arakan Airfield, Burma, c. 29 December 1944 – 23 January 1945)
- Sinthe Airfield, Burma, 4 February 1945
- Burnpur Airfield, India, 14 March 1945
- Ondaw Airfield, Burma, 29 March 1945
- Meiktila Airfield, Burma, 5 April 1945
- Toungoo Airfield, Burma, 27 April 1945
- Burnpur Airfield, India, 14 May – 6 October 1945
- Camp Kilmer, New Jersey, 1–3 November 1945
- McCoy Air Force Base, Florida, 1 February 1962 – 31 December 1969
- Tinker Air Force Base, Oklahoma, 1 July 1976 – present

=== Aircraft ===
- Boeing B-17 Flying Fortress (1942)
- Consolidated B-24 Liberator (1942–1943)
- Stinson L-5 Sentinel (1944–1945)
- Noorduyn C-64 Norseman (1944–1945)
- Lockheed RC-121 (later EC-121) Warning Star (1963–1969)
- Lockheed TC-121 Constellation (1962–1963)
- Boeing C-135 Stratolifter (1977–1979)
- Boeing E-3 Sentry (1977–present)

=== Awards and campaigns ===
Award streamer	Award	Dates	Notes
	Air Force Meritorious Unit Award	1 June 2006 – 31 May 2007	966th Airborne Air Control Squadron
	Air Force Meritorious Unit Award	1 June 2020 – 31 May 2021	966th Airborne Air Control Squadron
	Air Force Outstanding Unit Award with Combat "V" Device	[15 Nov 1969] – 31 Dec 1969	966th Airborne Early Warning and Control Squadron
	Air Force Outstanding Unit Award with Combat "V" Device	1 June 2002 – 31 May 2003	966th Airborne Air Control Squadron
	Air Force Outstanding Unit Award	1 July 1961 – 30 June 1963	966th Airborne Early Warning and Control Squadron
	Air Force Outstanding Unit Award	20 October 1962 – 30 November 1962	966th Airborne Early Warning and Control Squadron
	Air Force Outstanding Unit Award	15 April 1965 – 1 July 1966	966th Airborne Early Warning and Control Squadron
	Air Force Outstanding Unit Award	2 July 1966 – 1 July 1968	966th Airborne Early Warning and Control Squadron
	Air Force Outstanding Unit Award	1 July 1977 – 30 June 1978	966th Airborne Warning and Control Training Squadron
	Air Force Outstanding Unit Award	1 July 1978 – 30 June 1980	966th Airborne Warning and Control Training Squadron
	Air Force Outstanding Unit Award	1 July 1982 – 30 June 1984	966th Airborne Warning and Control Training Squadron
	Air Force Outstanding Unit Award	1 May 1985 – 30 April 1987	966th Airborne Warning and Control Training Squadron
	Air Force Outstanding Unit Award	1 May 1987 – 30 April 1989	966th Airborne Warning and Control Training Squadron
	Air Force Outstanding Unit Award	1 December 1989 – 1 December 1991	966th Airborne Warning and Control Training Squadron
	Air Force Outstanding Unit Award	1 April 1992 – 31 March 1994	966th Airborne Warning and Control Training Squadron
	Air Force Outstanding Unit Award	1 June 1994 – 31 May 1996	966th Airborne Air Control Squadron
	Air Force Outstanding Unit Award	1 June 1996 – 31 May 1998	966th Airborne Air Control Squadron
	Air Force Outstanding Unit Award	1 June 1998 – 31 May 2000	966th Airborne Air Control Squadron
	Air Force Outstanding Unit Award	1 June 2001 – 31 May 2002	966th Airborne Air Control Squadron
	Air Force Outstanding Unit Award	1 June 2003 – 31 May 2004	966th Airborne Air Control Squadron
	Air Force Outstanding Unit Award	1 June 2007 – 31 May 2008	966th Airborne Air Control Squadron
	Air Force Outstanding Unit Award	1 June 2012 – 31 May 2013	966th Airborne Air Control Squadron
	Air Force Outstanding Unit Award	1 June 2013 – 31 May 2014	966th Airborne Air Control Squadron
	Vietnamese Gallantry Cross with Palm	1 April 1966 – 31 December 1969	966th Airborne Early Warning and Control Squadron

Campaign Streamer	Campaign	Dates	Notes
	American Theater without inscription	15 July 1942 – 1 April 1944	466th Bombardment Squadron
	India-Burma	3 September 1944 – 28 January 1945	166th Liaison Squadron
	Central Burma	29 January 1945 – 15 July 1945	166th Liaison Squadron

== See also ==
- List of United States Air Force airborne air control squadrons
- B-17 Flying Fortress units of the United States Army Air Forces
- B-24 Liberator units of the United States Army Air Forces
