= 396th Bombardment Group =

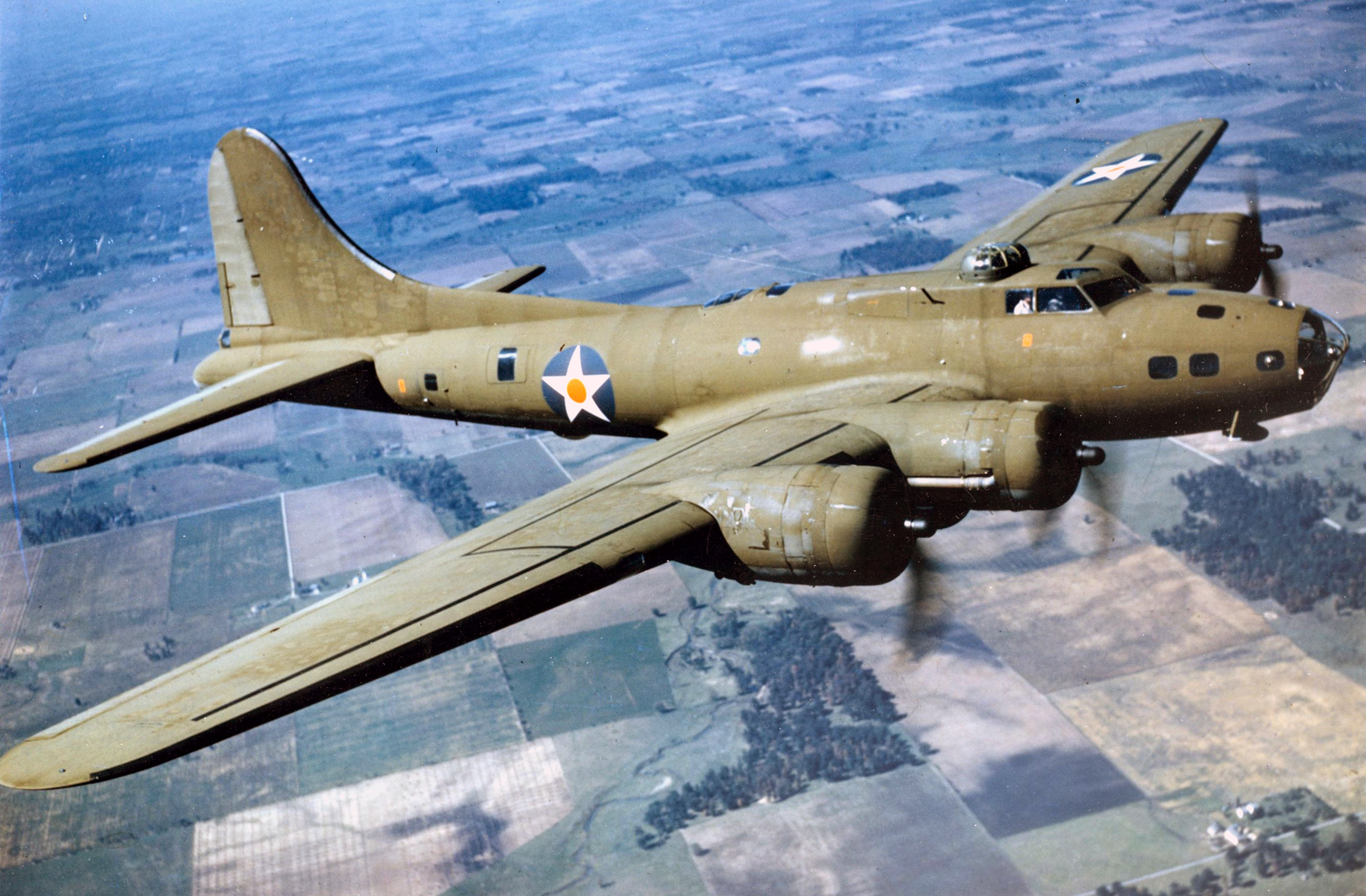
- B-17 as used by the 396th Group for training
- Active: 1943–1944
- Country: United States
- Branch: United States Air Force
- Role: Heavy bomber training

The 396th Bombardment Group is a former United States Army Air Forces unit. It was active during World War II as a Boeing B-17 Flying Fortress Operational Training Unit, training newly organized units, then as a Replacement Training Unit for aircrews. It was inactivated in 1944 in a general reorganization of Army Air Forces training units.

== History ==
The 396th Bombardment Group was activated at Mountain Home Army Air Field, Idaho on 16 February 1943 with the 592d, 593d, 594th and 595th Bombardment Squadrons assigned. After initial organization and equipping with Boeing B-17 Flying Fortress heavy bombers, the group moved to Moses Lake Army Air Base, Washington. There the 396th acted as an Operational Training Unit (OTU) for B-17 units. The OTU program was patterned after the unit training system of the Royal Air Force. The OTU program involved the use of an oversized parent unit to provide cadres to "satellite groups". It assumed responsibility for their training and oversaw their expansion with graduates of Army Air Forces Training Command schools to become effective combat units. Phase I training concentrated on individual training in crewmember specialties. Phase II training emphasized the coordination for the crew to act as a team. The final phase concentrated on operation as a unit.

In August 1943, the unit's mission changed to being a Replacement Training Unit (RTU). By This time most combat units had been activated and many of them had deployed overseas. With the exception of special programs, like forming Boeing B-29 Superfortress units, training "fillers" for existing units became more important than unit training. Like OTUs, RTUs were oversized units. Their mission, however was to train individual pilots or aircrews.

In November 1943, the 396th moved to Drew Field, Florida, where it would remain for the duration of its active service. However, the Army Air Forces was finding that standard military units, based on relatively inflexible tables of organization were not well adapted to the training mission. Accordingly, it adopted a more functional system in which each base was organized into a separate numbered unit. The 592d was inactivated on 1 May 1944 at Drew Field, Florida. Its personnel and equipment became part of the 326th AAF Base Unit.

== Lineage ==
- Constituted as the 396th Bombardment Group (Heavy) on 29 January 1943

Activated on 16 February 1943.
Inactivated on 1 May 1944

=== Assignments ===
- II Bomber Command, 16 February 1943
- Second Air Force, 6 October 1943
- III Bomber Command, 5 November 1943 – 1 May 1944

=== Components ===
- 592d Bombardment Squadron: 19 January 1943 – 1 May 1944
- 593d Bombardment Squadron: 19 January 1943 – 1 May 1944
- 594th Bombardment Squadron: 19 January 1943 – 1 May 1944
- 595th Bombardment Squadron: 19 January 1943 – 1 May 1944

=== Stations ===
- Mountain Home Army Air Field, Idaho, 16 February 1943
- Moses Lake Army Air Base, Washington, 10 April 1943
- Drew Field, Florida, 5 November 1943 – 1 May 1944

=== Aircraft ===
- Boeing B-17 Flying Fortress, 1943-1944

=== Campaign ===
Campaign Streamer	Campaign	Dates	Notes
	American Theater without inscription	19 January 1943 – 1 May 1944	

== See also ==
- B-17 Flying Fortress units of the United States Army Air Forces
