= James Hitselberger =

American linguist

James Hitselberger is an American linguist who was a former United States Navy contractor.

== Prosecution ==
Hitselberger worked as an Arabic translator for the United States Fifth Fleet in Bahrain. Hitselberger worked for Navy contractor Global Linguist Solutions.

In December 2012, Hitselberger was charged with "unlawful retention of national defense information" in violation of the Espionage Act of 1917. He was the seventh person charged with by the Obama administration under the violating the Espionage Act. He was released on bail pending trial on the order of U.S. District Judge Rudolph Contreras.

While Hitselberger's motives were not made clear at his plea hearing, there was never any indication that Hitselberger committed espionage. Rather, Hitselberger was a longstanding "peripatetic collector of rare documents"; his living area in Bahrain, where the classified documents were found, was "extremely cluttered" and filled with hundreds of newspapers and books. Hitselberger donated some of his rarer and more valuable finds to the Hoover Institution Archives at Stanford University; according to federal investigators, the public archives of the collection included one classified document that Hitselberger had donated, and "in a secure, non-public area of the Archives, agents also discovered two other documents marked SECRET." Hitselberger told Naval Criminal Investigative Service agents that "his sole purpose was to take the materials to his quarters to read" and that he was not aware that the records were classified, although they were marked as such.

In April 2014, Hitselberger and federal prosecutors reached a plea agreement. Under the agreement, Hitselberger pleaded guilty to a single misdemeanor of unauthorized retention and removal of classified documents, and the Espionage Act charge was dropped. The charge to which Hitselberger pleaded guilty involved only two documents; the earlier dropped charges related to the documents donated to the Hoover Institution.

On July 17, 2014, Hitselberger was sentenced to time served, and a $250 fine.
