= DynCorp =

Defunct American corporation

DynCorp International Inc.
- Type: Private
- Industry: Military contractor, service-focused
- Founded: 14 January 1946 incorporated in Delaware as California Eastern Aviation
- Defunct: 21 April 2021
- Fate: Acquired by Amentum
- Successor: Amentum
- Headquarters: McLean, Virginia (2013)
- Area served: Worldwide
- Key people: George Krivo (CEO) (2017)
- Products: Aviation maintenance, air operations, drug eradication, law enforcement training, logistics, contingency operations, security services, operations and maintenance for land vehicles (MRAPs), maintenance for aircraft, support equipment, and weapons systems, intelligence training and solutions, international development
- Revenue: ▲US$ 3.047 billion (2010)
- Operating income: ▲US$ 120.00 million (2008)
- Net income: ▲US$ 47.95 million (2008)
- Total assets: ▲US$ 1.402 billion (2008)
- Total equity: ▲US$ 424.29 million (2008)
- Owner: Cerberus Capital Management
- Number of employees: 14,000 (2007)
- Website: Dyn-intl.com

DynCorp International Inc. (/ˈdaɪnkɔːrp/), was an American private military contractor. Starting as an aviation company, the company also provided flight operations support, training and mentoring, international development, intelligence training and support, contingency operations, security, and operations and maintenance of land vehicles. DynCorp received more than 96% of its more than $3 billion in annual revenue from the U.S. federal government. The corporate headquarters were in an unincorporated part of Fairfax County near Falls Church, Virginia, while the company's contracts were managed from its office at Alliance Airport in Fort Worth, Texas. DynCorp provided services for the U.S. military in several theaters, including Bolivia, Bosnia, Somalia, Angola, Haiti, Colombia, Kosovo and Kuwait. It also provided much of the security for Afghan president Hamid Karzai's presidential guard and trained much of the police forces of Iraq and Afghanistan. DynCorp was also hired to assist recovery in Louisiana and neighboring areas after Hurricane Katrina. The company held one contract on every round of competition since receiving the first Contract Field Teams contract in 1951.

In 2020, Dyncorp was bought by Germantown, Maryland-based defense support services conglomerate Amentum. On April 21, 2021, the DynCorp name was discontinued, and employees and services transferred to Amentum.

== History ==
=== California Eastern Aviation (1946–1961) ===
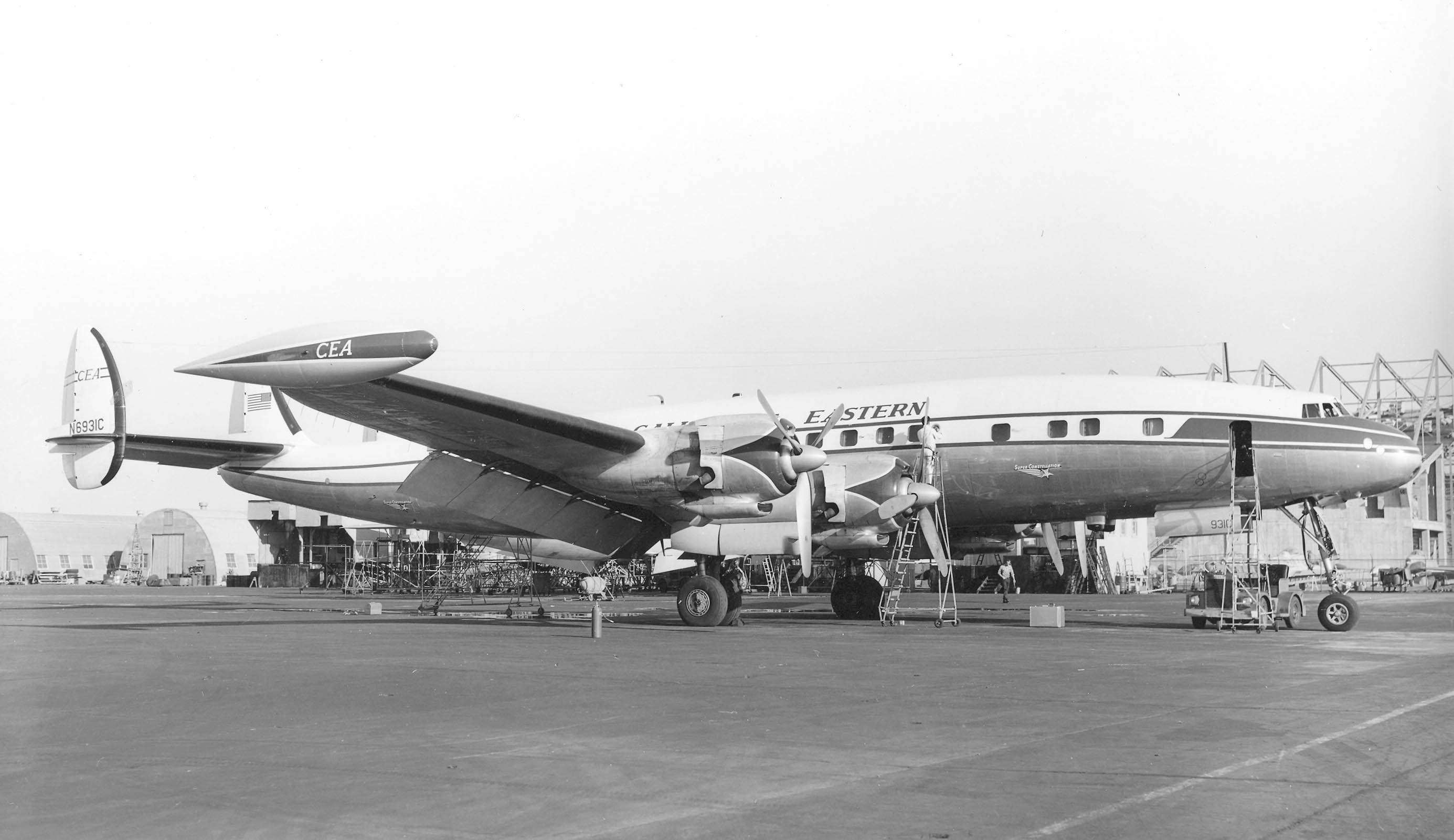
Lockheed L-1049, Oakland, 1957

California Eastern Aviation was incorporated in Delaware on January 14, 1946. It operated as a common carrier from then until 1948, flying freight between east and west coasts, one of the largest domestic freight operators of the time. Unfortunately, this was not profitable, and the company entered bankruptcy in May 1948, ceasing common carrier activities and leasing out its aircraft instead, which enabled it to exit bankruptcy in 1950. It then became an uncertificated carrier, flying for the US military. During the 1950s its California Eastern Airways division supported the Korean War, the DEW Line, US activities in the Philippines, French Indochina and maintained personnel in Tokyo, Hawaii, Wake Island, one of the largest such operators. The airline flew both Douglas DC-4s and Lockheed Constellations. In 1959, the carrier received interim certification as a supplemental air carrier at which time it had two divisions (the airline operation and Flight Training) and two subsidiaries, Land-Air and Air Carrier Service Corp. Land-Air held contracts performing instrumentation and R&D activities at White Sands Missile Range. In 1960, California Eastern sold its airline operations to President Airlines.

DynCorp traces its origins from two companies formed in 1946: California Eastern Airways (CEA), an air freight business, and Land-Air Inc., an aircraft maintenance company. California Eastern Airways was founded by a small group of returning World War II pilots who wanted to break into the air cargo business. They were one of the first firms to ship cargo by air, and within a year, the firm was serving both coasts. California Eastern Airways diversified into multiple government aviation and managerial jobs, airlifted supplies for the Korean War, and was responsible for the White Sands Missile Range (a client that DynCorp has retained for 50 years).

In 1951 Land-Air Inc., which implemented the first Contract Field Teams (teams of technicians that maintained military aircraft for the United States Air Force), was bought by California Eastern Aviation Inc. DynCorp still holds the contract 50 years later, maintaining rotary and fixed-wing aircraft for all branches of the U.S. Armed Forces. At this time, revenues for the company reached $6 million.

In 1952 the company, renamed California Eastern Aviation, Inc., merged with Air Carrier Service Corporation (AIRCAR), which sold commercial aircraft and spare parts to foreign airlines and governments.

=== Dynalectron (1962–1987) ===
By 1961 California Eastern Aviation needed a new name to reflect the growing and diversifying company. The name "Dynalectron Corporation" was selected from 5,000 employee suggestions. In 1976 Dynalectron established headquarters in McLean, Virginia. Due to its growing size, the company restructured into four main operating groups: Specialty Contracting, Energy, Government Services, and Aviation Services. In the 30 years since the foundation of CEA, Dynalectron had acquired 19 companies in 30 years, had assets of $88 million, maintained a backlog of $250 million, employed 7,000, and had annual sales of $300 million.

In 1964 Dynalectron diversified into the energy services business with the acquisition of Hydrocarbon Research, Inc. Through this acquisition Dynalectron developed a process called H-Coal, which converted coal into synthetic liquid fuels. The work began to attract national attention with the Arab Oil Embargos of the 1970s. By the early 1980s Texaco, Ruhrkohle and Itochu were all marketing Dynalectron's H-Oil process.

Between 1976 and 1981 the company had two public stock offerings and acquired another 14 companies. By 1986 Dynaelectron was one of the largest defense contractors in North America.

=== DynCorp and expansion (1987–2003) ===
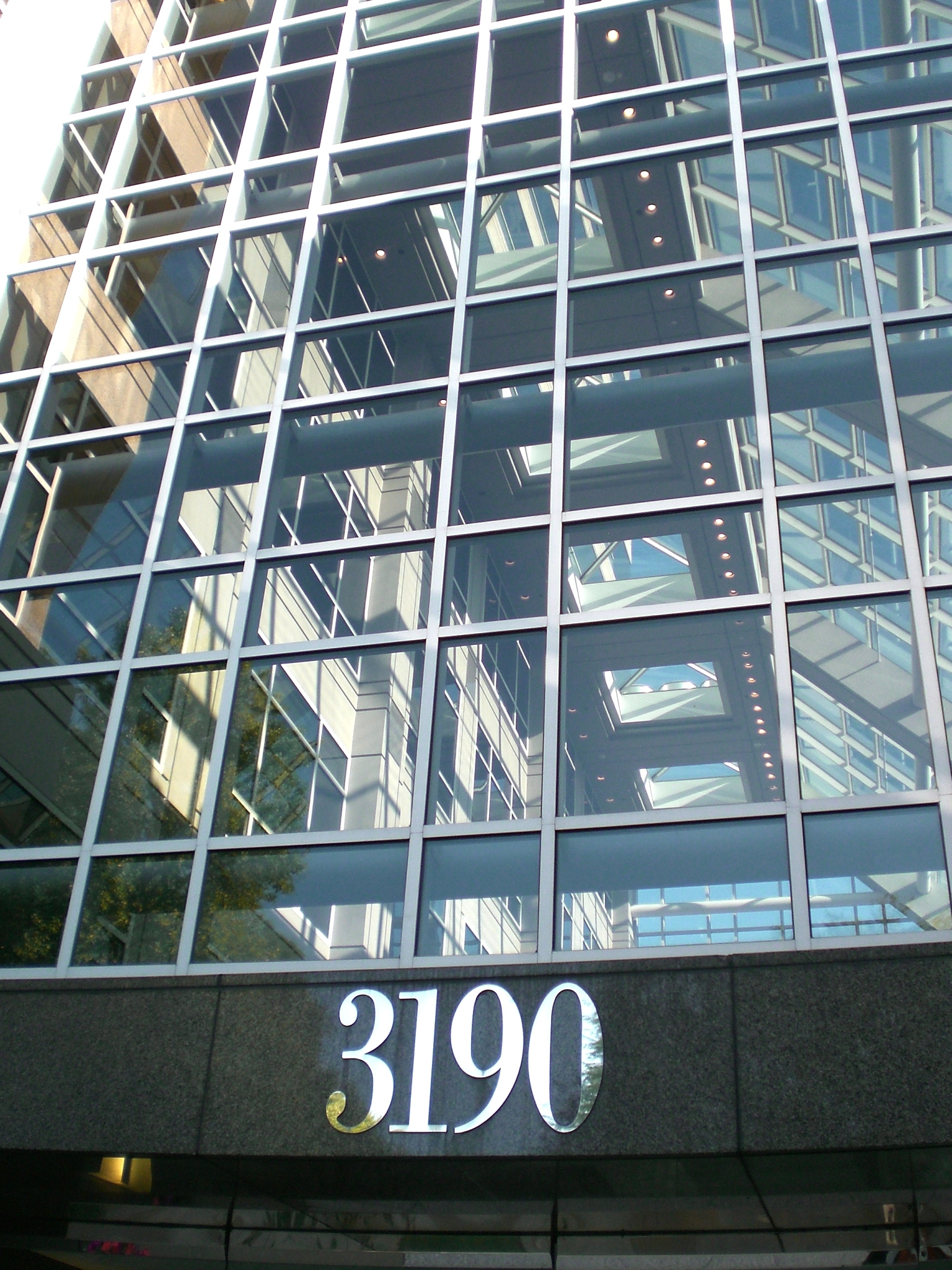
DynCorp's headquarters

In 1987 Dynalectron changed its name to DynCorp. In 1988 DynCorp went private to avoid a hostile takeover by Miami financier Victor Posner, via an employee initiative led by Daniel R. Bannister. Bannister, as T. Rees Shapiro wrote in his 2011 obituary, "was paid $1.65 an hour when he joined DynCorp as an electronics technician in 1953," rising to serve as its president and CEO (1985 to 1997).

In 1994 DynCorp's revenues were approximately $1 billion. In 1997, DynCorp partnered with British company Porton International to form DynPort Vaccine Group. That same year, DynPort was contracted by the Joint Vaccine Acquisition Program (JVAP) of the United States Department of Defense to manufacture 300,000 doses of a new smallpox vaccine for the military.

By the time of his retirement in 2003, Shapiro notes that Bannister "oversaw the acquisition of more than 40 companies… [and] was credited with helping to mold… an aviation services company into a sprawling conglomerate that employed 24,000 people and earned $2.4 billion in annual revenue." As well he "oversaw DynCorp contracts to operate missile test ranges for the Defense Department, develop vaccines for the National Institutes of Health and install security systems in U.S. embassies for the State Department." Shapiro notes that during Bannister's tenure Dyncorp had also "supplied bodyguards to Haitian President Jean Bertrand Aristide in the 1990s and to Afghan President Hamid Karzai in the early 2000s."

With the reductions in military spending in the 1990s, DynCorp expanded their focus to the growing tech market. It bought 19 digital and network service firms and acquired contracts with the government's information technology (IT) departments. By 2003 roughly half of DynCorp's business came from managing the IT departments of the Central Intelligence Agency, Federal Bureau of Investigation, and the U.S. Securities and Exchange Commission, among others. In 1999 DynCorp moved its headquarters to Reston, Virginia.

In December 2000 DynCorp formed DynCorp International LLC, and transferred all its international business to this entity. DynCorp Technical Services LLC continued to perform DynCorp's domestic contracts.

=== Sale to CSC, IPO, and purchase by Cerberus Capital (2003–2020) ===
In March 2003 DynCorp and its subsidiaries were acquired by Computer Sciences Corporation (CSC) for approximately $914 million. Less than two years later, CSC announced the sale of three DynCorp units (DynCorp International, DynMarine and certain DynCorp Technical Services contracts) to Veritas Capital Fund, LP for $850 million. After the sale, CSC retained the rights to the name "DynCorp" and the new company became DynCorp International.

In 2006 DynCorp International went public on the New York Stock Exchange under the symbol DCP.

On April 12, 2010, DynCorp International announced a conditional deal to be acquired by private equity investment firm Cerberus Capital Management for $17.55 per share ($1 billion). The deal was agreed on 7 July 2010.

In December 2011, the company hired Michael Thibault, former co-chairman and commissioner of the Commission on Wartime Contracting in Iraq and Afghanistan (CWC), as vice president of government finance and compliance. In 2011, Dyncorp set a company record with 12,300 new hires, bringing the total number of employees to 27,000.

=== Acquisition by Amentum (2020–present) ===
On November 23, 2020, Amentum, a contractor supporting U.S. federal and allied governments, announced that it has closed the acquisition of DynCorp International (due to multiple human trafficking cases), a provider of sophisticated aviation, logistics, training, intelligence and operational solutions in over 30 countries worldwide. The combination has also created one of the largest providers of mission critical support services to government customers, with 34,000 team members in 105 countries around the world.

== Services ==
=== Air operations ===
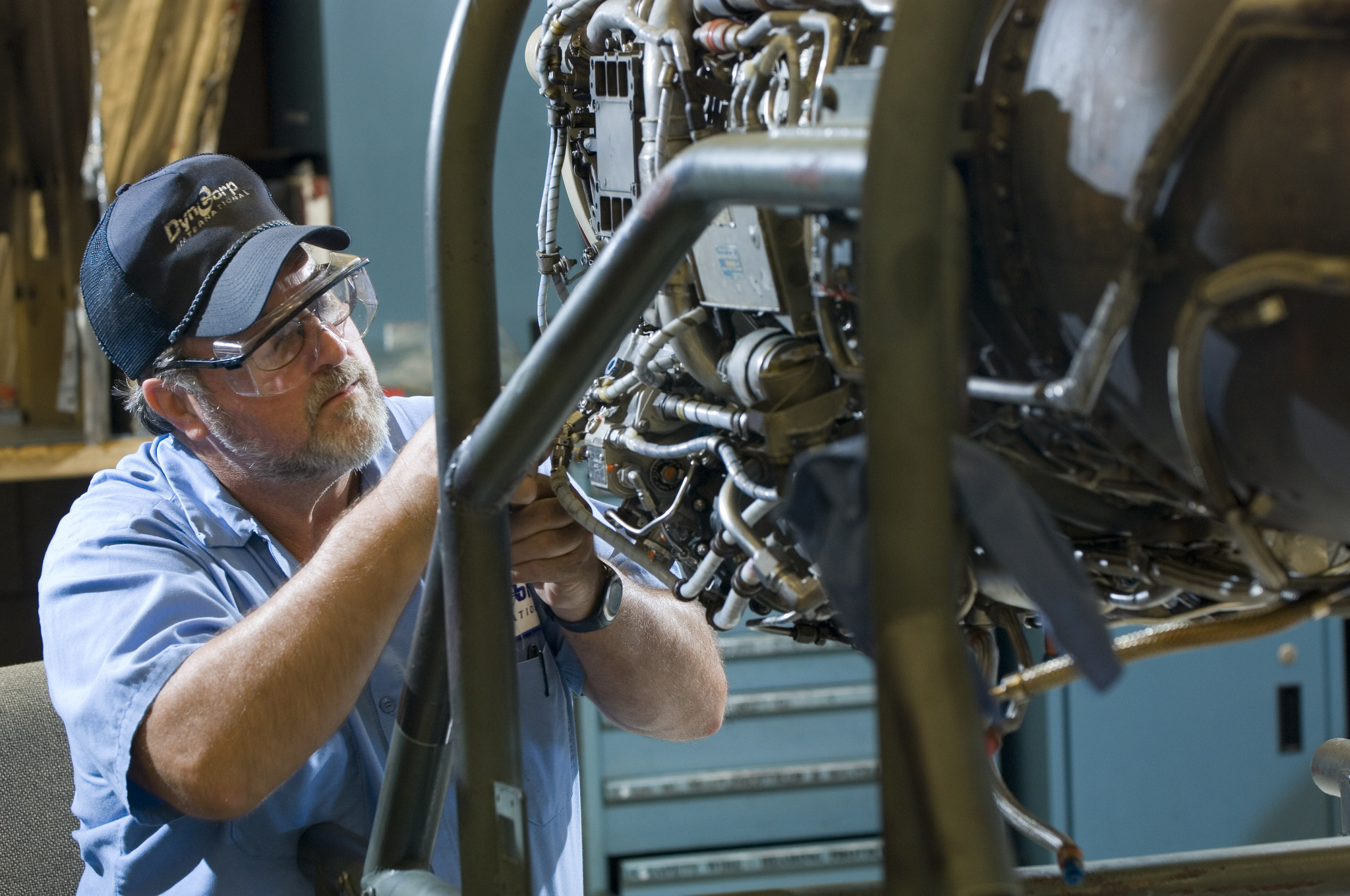
A DynCorp employee working with aviation support

DynCorp International provides aviation support to reduce the flow of illicit drugs, strengthen law enforcement, and eliminate terrorism. Their air operations include the operation of fixed-wing and rotary aircraft on and around aircraft carriers for either combat or non-combat missions, aviation life support missions, and aerial/satellite imagery. DynCorp was hired to strengthen the Afghan air force, helping to train Afghan pilots so they could, in turn, train other Afghans. They have also provided air operations support in Iraq, including search and rescue, medical evacuations, and transporting quick reaction forces.

=== Aviation ===
DynCorp International began as an aeronautical company in the 1950s and continues to provide aviation support globally. Aviation support including emergency response air programs, aircraft maintenance, theater aviation support management, helicopter maintenance support, supportability and testing.

In 2012 DynCorp played a key part in the Space Shuttle Endeavour's final flight as it made its way from the Kennedy Space Center in Orlando to the California Science Center in Los Angeles aboard NASA's specially crafted Shuttle Carrier Aircraft (SCA). The SCA was a uniquely configured Boeing 747-100 aircraft. DynCorp mechanics worked with NASA and other support contractors performed maintenance and inspection services to the SCA. DynCorp's involvement in Endeavour's final flight was part of a contract NASA awarded to the company in April 2012 to provide aircraft maintenance and operational support at various locations throughout the country.

==== Emergency response air programs ====
DynCorp has been working with the California Department of Forestry and Fire Protection (known as CAL FIRE) to suppress and control wild land fire. DynCorp flies and maintains Grumman S-2 Tracker fire retardant air tankers and OV-10A aircraft, and maintains and services civilian UH-1H Super Huey helicopters flown by CAL FIRE pilots. Operating from across California, aircraft can reach most fires within 20 minutes.

==== Aircraft maintenance ====
DynCorp provides aircraft maintenance, fleet testing and evaluation for rotary, fixed, "lighter-than-air", and unmanned aircraft. Specifically, they provide on-site work for project testing, transient, loaner, leased and tested civilian aircraft services. DynCorp also performs supportability and safety studies as well as off-site aircraft safety and spill containment patrols and aircraft recovery services. DynCorp has received contracts for aircraft maintenance with the United States Navy, the U.S. Air Force, the U.S. Army, and NASA. DynCorp provides aircraft maintenance in countries including the Republic of the Philippines, the United States, throughout Europe, Southwest Asia, the Middle East, and Africa. Additionally, DynCorp provides aircraft maintenance support to facilities including the NAS Patuxent River, Johnson Space Center in Houston, the Langley Research Center in Hampton, Virginia, NASA facilities in El Paso, Texas, Edwards Air Force Base in California, and Robins Air Force Base (AFB) in Georgia.

Among its notable awards is its unbroken record of having received a contract in every round of competition under the United States Air Force-managed Contract Field Teams (CFT) program since the CFT program started in 1951.

The company recently opened up an office in Huntsville, Alabama, to allow it to further focus on its aviation business. The Army Materiel Command, Army Contracting Command and the U.S. Army Security Assistance Command all have or soon will have their headquarters on Redstone Arsenal. The U.S. Air Force chose DynCorp to supply support services for the military's T-6 and T-6B trainer aircraft. As part of that contract DynCorp will open, operate and manage Contractor Operated and Maintained Base Supply facilities at nine Air Force and Navy locations.

==== Helicopter maintenance support ====
DynCorp International has been the incumbent recipient of helicopter maintenance and support contracts supporting the U.S. Army, the U.S. Air Force, and the U.S. Navy. It also received the task order to provide theater aviation support management for US Army helicopters in Europe (TASM-E). The U.S. Army Contracting Command gave DynCorp International a contract to provide a maintenance augmentation team for the Kuwait Air Force's AH-64D Apache helicopter maintenance program. DynCorp has worked as a partner for supporting the Air Force's fleet of 39 F/A-18 Hornet aircraft program since 1997.

=== Contingency operations ===
A significant part of the company's business since the 1990s has come from contingency operations support. The company supports existing bases in Southern Afghanistan, builds new ones as needed, and provides base support services.

=== Development ===
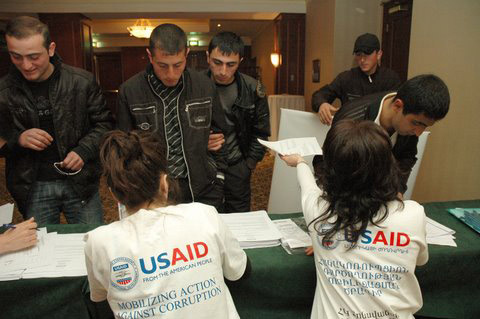
DynCorp international development

In January 2010 DynCorp International combined with World Wide Humanitarian Services (WWHS) and Casals & Associates to form DI Development. DI Development provides humanitarian aid, reconstruction to conflict and post-conflict areas, and governance reforms.

DynCorp International made several acquisitions in 2009 and 2010 to adapt to the defense sector's shift towards diplomacy and development work, in particular acquiring an international development firm in order to enter the international aid community. DI Development is particularly active in Africa and Latin America. In Africa DI Development strengthened government financial management in Ghana, assisted in peace and recovery advancement in Uganda, and led anti-corruption programs in Madagascar, Malawi, and Nigeria. In Latin America DI Development implemented anti-corruption, transparency, and accountability programs in Guatemala, El Salvador, Nicaragua, and Panama, and provided democracy and governance initiatives in Mexico, Bolivia, and the Dominican Republic.

=== Intelligence training and solutions ===
In 2010 DynCorp International acquired Phoenix Consulting Group to expand the company into intelligence training and solutions. By acquiring the Phoenix Consulting Group, DynCorp provides training courses to the intelligence community at the Phoenix Training Center. Dyncorp International employs 300 intelligence professionals to offer highly specialized training for intelligence, counterintelligence, special operations and law enforcement personnel. It also provides linguist operations, including language training, translation specialists recruiting, and field translation support for the U.S. armed forces.

Through a joint venture with McNeil Technologies called Global Linguist Solutions, Dyncorp was awarded a five-year contract to provide management of translation and interpretation services to support U.S. Intelligence and Security Command (INSCOM) as part of Operation Iraqi Freedom. Under the contract, DynCorp employed 6,000 locally hired translators and 1,000 U.S. citizens who are native speakers of languages spoken in Iraq. DynCorp International was also given a $17.1 million task order to provide leadership to military personnel of the Democratic Republic of the Congo. The program focuses on training junior and mid-level personnel in areas such as communications, logistics, and engineering.

DynCorp president Steven Schorer expects the training and support logistics for the military and intelligence community to grow significantly in the coming years.

Two DynCorp American employees were among the five killed in Jordan by a co-worker on 9 November 2015. The incident occurred at the International Police Training Centre in Zarqa. The program the men were working on is funded by the State Department's Bureau of Diplomatic Security and Bureau of International Narcotics and Law Enforcement Affairs.

=== Operations and maintenance ===
DynCorp provides military base operations and vehicle maintenance. They manage installations for military bases for the Department of Defense and the Department of State, and provide security services, fire and rescue emergency services, and IT/telecommunication services. In particular, DynCorp supports a military base camp in Kosovo, providing power plant maintenance, fueling services, and grounds maintenance. DynCorp is also active in vehicular maintenance, in particular providing the United Arab Emirates with depot-level maintenance, facilities management, and commercialization for its 17,000 ground vehicles. In April 2012 DynCorp International was awarded a contract with the U.S. Navy to provide facility support services for personnel from the Naval Mobile Construction Battalion unit Timor-Leste, including living quarters, internet and telephone services, bathroom facilities, laundry services, kitchen facilities, vehicle/driver/language support, procurement services, warehousing and other services.

DynCorp also formed a joint venture with Oshkosh Defense, Force Protection Industries, and McLane Advanced Technologies to pursue a $3 billion five-year Army contract for support and maintenance of mine-resistant ambush-protected vehicles. The U.S. Defense Department gave DynCorp the Nunn-Perry Award in recognition of its mentor-protege arrangement with CenterScope Technologies, in which it provided coaching in development of new markets, establishing international operations and in worldwide logistics. As a result of this mentoring CTSI's revenue grew from $5 million to $32 million in 18 months.

=== Security services ===
DynCorp provides personal security throughout various parts of the world. It supplies Africa, Latin America, and the Middle East with threat assessment protection, perimeter security, base security, and guard services. DynCorp supported the U.S. Army in the Persian Gulf with vehicle searches, roving patrols, and explosive-detecting dogs. It also provides personal security to many regions of Iraq and Afghanistan.

Culpeper National Security Solutions is a unit of DynCorp.

=== Training and mentoring ===
DynCorp delivers training for multiple sectors, including security sector reform, interior and defense personnel in underdeveloped nations, and law enforcement. Since 1994 DynCorp has trained and deployed 6,000 law enforcement workers in 16 countries, including Iraq and Afghanistan. DynCorp is looking to partner with Raytheon as a prime or subcontractor on the Teach, Educate, Coach program, which is part of the Army's Warfighter Field Operations Customer Support program.

== Controversies ==
=== Latin America incidents ===
In September 2001 Ecuadorian farmers filed a class-action lawsuit against DynCorp. On February 15, 2013, the court granted summary judgment to DynCorp, dismissing the sole remaining human health and medical monitoring claims Ecuadorian plaintiffs had brought in connection with counternarcotic aerial herbicide spraying operations in southern Colombia. The plaintiffs are preparing to appeal the dismissal.

An extensive accusation concerning DynCorp's activities and alleged abuses in Colombia was presented against DynCorp at the Hearing on Biodiversity of the Permanent Peoples' Tribunal, session on Colombia at the Cacarica Humanitarian Zone from February 24 to 27, 2007.

Three DynCorp employees died when their helicopter was shot down during an anti-drug mission in Peru in 1992.

On November 29, 2008, a lengthy article in The New York Times questioned the potential conflict of interest in the hiring by Veritas Capital Fund, LP, holding company for DynCorp, of Gen. Barry McCaffrey. McCaffrey had previously served as White House "Drug Czar", where he shaped future federal public-private partnership in drug enforcement policy.

=== Sex trafficking of children in Bosnia ===
According to Human Rights Watch, there is substantial evidence that points to the involvement of DynCorp contractors in trafficking of women and girls in Bosnia and Herzegovina, as well as violence against them.

In the late 1990s two employees, Ben Johnston, a former DynCorp aircraft mechanic, and Kathryn Bolkovac, a U.N. International Police Force monitor, independently alleged that DynCorp employees in Bosnia engaged in sex with minors and sold them to each other as slaves. Johnston and Bolkovac were fired, and Johnston was later placed into protective custody before leaving several days later.

On June 2, 2000, an investigation was launched in the DynCorp hangar at Comanche Base Camp, one of two U.S. bases in Bosnia and Herzegovina, and all DynCorp personnel were detained for questioning. CID spent several weeks investigating and the results appear to support Johnston's allegations. DynCorp had fired five employees for similar illegal activities prior to the charges. Many of the employees accused of sex trafficking were forced to resign under suspicion of illegal activity. As of 2014 no one had been prosecuted.

In 2002, Bolkovac filed a lawsuit in Great Britain against DynCorp for unfair dismissal due to a protected disclosure (whistleblowing), and won. Bolkovac co-authored a book with Cari Lynn titled The Whistleblower: Sex Trafficking, Military Contractors And One Woman's Fight For Justice. In 2010 the film The Whistleblower, starring Rachel Weisz and Vanessa Redgrave, was released.

=== Iraq incidents ===
According to The New York Times, the Special Inspector General for Iraq Reconstruction (SIGIR) found that "DynCorp seemed to act almost independently of its reporting officers at the Department of State, billing the United States for millions of dollars of work that were not authorized and beginning other jobs without a go-ahead." The report states that the findings of DynCorp's misconduct on a $188 million job to buy weapons and build quarters for the Iraqi police were serious enough to warrant a fraud inquiry. A U.S. government audit report of October 2007 revealed that $1.3 billion was spent on a contract with DynCorp for training Iraqi police. The auditors stated that the program was mismanaged to such an extent that they were unable to determine how the money was spent.

In February 2007 federal auditors cited DynCorp for wasting millions on projects, including building an unapproved, Olympic-sized swimming pool at the behest of Iraqi police officials. In April 2011 DynCorp agreed to pay $7.7 million to the U.S. government to settle claims that it had inflated claims for construction contracts in Iraq.

On October 11, 2007, a DynCorp security guard in a U.S. State Department convoy killed a taxi driver in Baghdad. According to several witnesses, the taxi did not pose a threat to the convoy's security.

A January 2010 SIGIR report assessed that oversight of DynCorp police training contracts by the Bureau of International Narcotics and Law Enforcement Affairs found that INL exhibited weak oversight of the DynCorp task orders for support of the Iraqi police training program. It found that INL lacks sufficient resources and controls to adequately manage the task orders with DynCorp. As a result, more than $2.5 billion in U.S. funds were vulnerable to waste and fraud, although SIGIR's Iraq reconstruction inspector Stuart Bowen noted that there was no indication that DynCorp had misspent any of the $2.5 billion.

In January 2020, DynCorp paid $1.5 million to settle civil fraud allegations against two DynCorp officials who solicited and accepted kickbacks from the Al-Qarat Company in exchange for influencing DynCorp's lease of property in Baghdad billed under a U.S. Department of State contract in 2011 and 2012.

=== Afghanistan incidents ===
In 2009 DynCorp contractors paid a 15-year-old Afghan Bacha Bazi performer to perform lap dances and entertain them in Kunduz. Several Afghans were later arrested and investigated. A Wikileaks cable released after the incident stated that the Afghan interior minister at the time, Hanif Atmar, asked the assistant U.S. ambassador to try to "quash" both the story and release of video from the incident. In response to the incident, DynCorp fired four senior managers and established a chief compliance officer position, which focused on ethics, business conduct, related investigations, and regulatory compliance.

On July 30, 2010, a riot broke out when an Afghan car and a DynCorp vehicle crashed on a road near Kabul International Airport. Although initial reports blamed the company and claimed four Afghans were killed in the accident, Sayed Abdul Ghaffar, the head of the Kabul police criminal investigations division, told The New York Times that the Afghan driver had caused the accident and said only one Afghan died in the wreck.

=== Mozambique incident ===
According to Mozambican media reports, the Mozambican government seized and impounded a 16-vehicle shipment of armored personnel carriers pending the outcome of investigations into alleged tax evasion and deception by OTT Technologies Mozambique.

=== Trump administration lobbying ===
DynCorp lobbied the Trump administration intensely to get the Trump administration to rescind a $10 billion contract that the Obama administration made with a rival company to service State Department aircraft.

== See also ==
- Blackwater Worldwide
- Carratu International
- Fluor Corporation
- KBR
- Kroll Inc.
- LOGCAP
- LOGCAP IV
- Military–industrial complex
  - Military–industrial–media complex
- Pinkerton Government Services
- Top 100 Contractors of the U.S. federal government
