= Tinker Air Force Base =

US Air Force base in Oklahoma City, Oklahoma, US

- Oklahoma City, Oklahoma in the United States of America
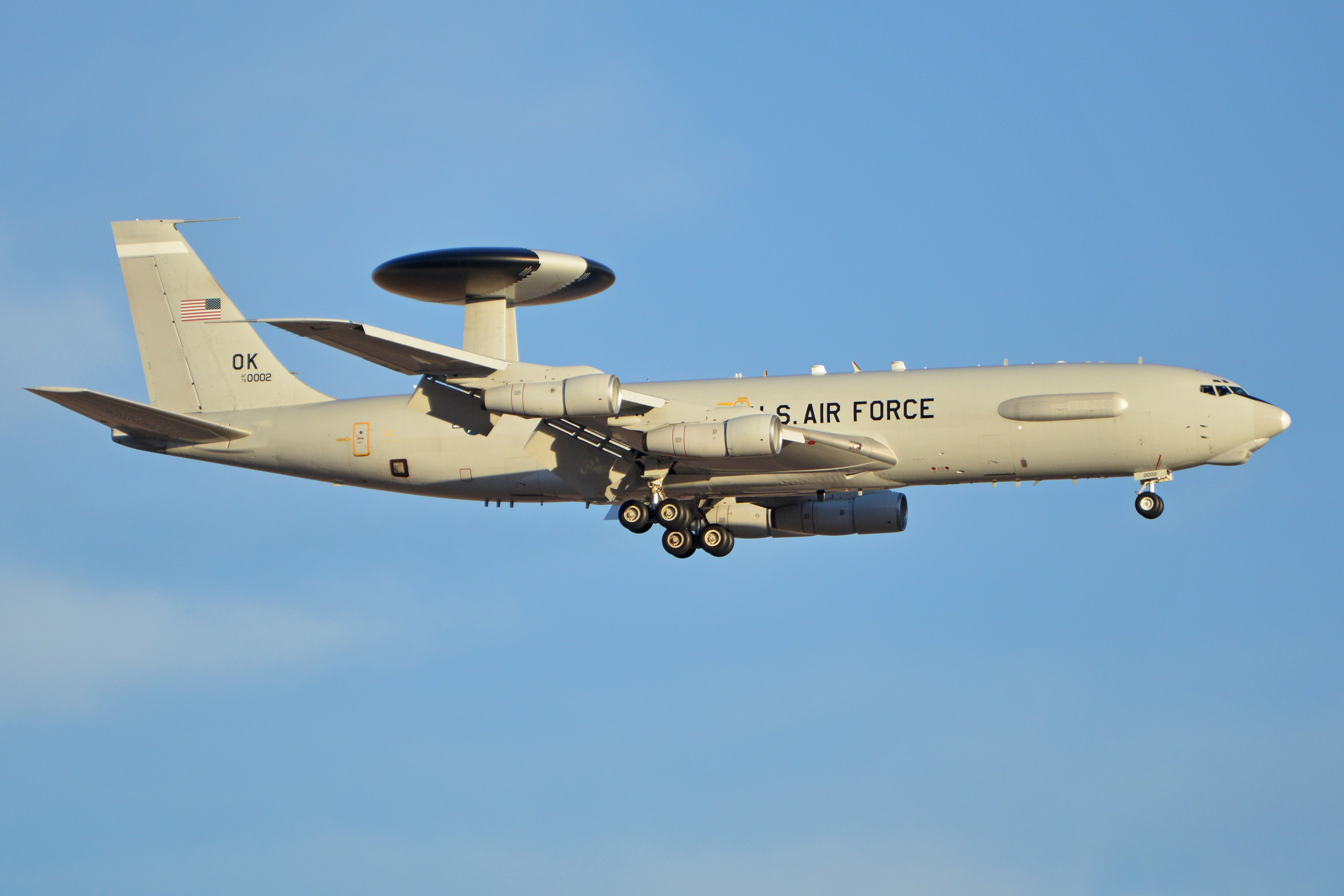
- An E-3B Sentry of the 552nd Air Control Wing based at Tinker AFB.

Site information
- Type: US Air Force Base
- Owner: Department of Defense
- Operator: US Air Force
- Controlled by: Air Force Materiel Command (AFMC)
- Condition: Operational
- Website: tinker.af.mil

Location
- Location within North America Location within the United States Location within Oklahoma
- Coordinates: 35°24′53″N 097°23′12″W

Site history
- Built: 1941 (as Midwest Air Depot)
- In use: 1941 – present

Garrison information
- Current commander: Colonel Abigail L. W. Ruscetta
- Garrison: 72nd Air Base Wing (Host); 507th Air Refueling Wing; 552nd Air Control Wing; Strategic Communications Wing One

Airfield information
- Identifiers: IATA: TIK, ICAO: KTIK, FAA LID: TIK, WMO: 723540
- Elevation: 1,291 feet (393 m) AMSL
Runways
Direction	Length and surface
18/36	11,100 feet (3,383 m) Porous European Mix
13/31	10,000 feet (3,048 m) Porous European Mix

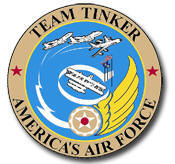

Tinker Air Force Base (IATA: TIK, ICAO: KTIK, FAA LID: TIK) is a major United States Air Force base, with tenant U.S. Navy and other Department of Defense missions, located in Oklahoma City, Oklahoma, adjacent to Del City and Midwest City.

The base, originally known as the Midwest Air Depot, is named in honor of Oklahoma native Major General Clarence L. Tinker, the first Native American major general.

Tinker is the headquarters of the Air Force Materiel Command's (AFMC) Oklahoma City Air Logistics Center (OC-ALC), which is the worldwide manager for a wide range of aircraft, engines, missiles, software and avionics and accessories components. The commander of Air Force Sustainment Center (AFSC) is Lieutenant General Stacey T. Hawkins and the commander of the OC-ALC is Brigadier General Brian R. Moore. The host unit at Tinker is the 72nd Air Base Wing (72 ABW) which provides services and support for the Oklahoma City Air Logistics Center and its tenant organizations. The Wing and Installation Commander of Tinker Air Force Base is Colonel Abigail L. W. Ruscetta.

== History ==
Tinker Air Force Base is named in honor of Major General Clarence L. Tinker. An Osage from Pawhuska, Oklahoma, he received his wings in 1921. He was a graduate of Wentworth Military Academy who went on to become the first major general of Native American descent in U.S. Army history.

In 1926 he was awarded the Soldier's Medal for returning to his blazing aircraft to rescue a fellow officer. On 7 June 1942, he led a flight of B-24 Liberators on a long-range strike against Japanese forces on Wake Island during World War II. Tinker was killed when his aircraft presumably crashed into the sea. At the time of his death, Tinker was commander of the Hawaii-based Seventh Air Force.

The base was originally called Midwest Air Depot and was renamed to honor Tinker. The creation of the base in Oklahoma City was in large part due to lobbying efforts by Stanley Draper.

Several of the base's access gates are named in honor of persons with historic ties to the base or to Oklahoma. On 9 May 1997, base officials placed the following names:

- Tinker Gate (former Gate 1), located on the north side, opens onto Air Depot Boulevard. It was named for Tinker
- Eaker Gate (former Gate 2) opens onto F Avenue. It was named for General Ira C. Eaker, commander of the US Eighth Air Force in Europe during World War II
- Turnbull Gate, at the intersection of Perimeter Road and A Avenue. It was named for Colonel William Turnbull, the first Tinker Air Logistics Center Commander (1942)
- Hruskocy Gate (pronounced ruh-sko-see, former Gate 7), on Industrial Boulevard at the NE portion of base. It was named for Brigadier General Thomas C. Hruskocy, the OC-ALC chief of Maintenance Resource Management and Material Management Resource divisions at Tinker (1985–1988)
- Hope Gate, on SE 59th Street. It was named for Colonel John W. Hope, the first commander of the Ground Electronics-Engineering Installation Agency (GEEIA)
- Gott Gate (former Gate 34), on the south end of Air Depot Boulevard. It was named for 1st Lieutenant Donald J. Gott, posthumous Medal of Honor recipient in World War II.
- Vance Gate (former Gate 40), on the west side of base off Sooner Road. It was named Lieutenant Colonel Leon R. Vance Jr, posthumous Medal of Honor recipient in World War II.

In May 1997 the Base named the gates along Douglas Boulevard after aircraft that had been maintained at Tinker:

- Lancer Gate, named for the Rockwell B-1 Lancer
- Liberator Gate, named for the Consolidated B-24 Liberator
- Marauder Gate, named for the Martin B-26 Marauder

The base has more than 26,000 military and civilian employees and is the largest single-site employer in the state of Oklahoma. The installation covers approx. 9 square miles (23 km^{2}) and has 760 buildings with a building floor space of over 15,200,000 square feet (1,410,000 m^{2}). The base is bounded by I-40 on the north and I-240 on the south.

With the City of Oklahoma City and Oklahoma County owning several square miles of land adjacent to the base, Tinker is one of the few military bases in a major metropolitan area with sufficient room for expansion. Furthermore, Tinker is located in a community that supports expansion; Oklahoma County voters approved a 2008 measure to purchase the former General Motors Oklahoma City Assembly plant (located adjacent to the base) and lease it to Tinker for future expansion. Now known as Building 9001, the former GM plant houses many shops moved from the main maintenance building, 3001.

== Operational history ==
In 1940 the War Department was considering the central United States as a location for a supply and maintenance depot. Oklahoma City leaders offered a 480-acre (1.9 km^{2}) site and acquired an option for 960 acres (3.9 km^{2}) additional land. On 8 April 1941, the order was officially signed awarding the depot to Oklahoma City. The Midwest Air Depot was formally activated later in 1941.

The depot was the site of a Douglas Aircraft factory producing approximately half of the C-47 Skytrains used in World War II. The site also produced a number of A-20 Havocs. Production ceased in 1945.

The first successful tornado forecast in history was issued on 25 March 1948 from Tinker, about three hours before a tornado hit the southeast corner of the base. A granite marker in the Heritage Airpark on the base commemorates the event.

On September 29, 1957 Buddy Holly and The Crickets recorded "An Empty Cup", "Rock Me My Baby", "You've Got Love", and "Maybe Baby" in the Tinker Air Force Base Officer's Club.

The base hosted the Space Shuttle Columbia and its carrier 747 on April 27, 1981, after its first mission (STS-1) during its journey back to Cape Canaveral. Oklahoma governor George Nigh, Oklahoma City mayor Patience Latting and Apollo 10 Commander Tom Stafford were there to greet the crew. The visiting personnel included Deke Slayton, who traveled beside the craft in a T-38 chase plane. An estimated 100,000 people were allowed to enter the base and take pictures.

On 14 November 1984, a massive fire that burned for two days destroyed or damaged over 700,000 square feet (65,000 m^{2}) in the Air Logistics Center, Building 3001. The resulting repairs cost $63.5 million.

During much of the 1990s, Tinker was home to the Automated Weather Network switching facility, which consolidated all U.S. military weather data worldwide. Originally located at Carswell Air Force Base, this unit was later moved to an Air Force Weather Agency facility at Offutt Air Force Base.

In May 1992, Tinker became home to the Navy's "Take Charge and Move Out" (TACAMO) wing, which provides maintenance, security, operations, administration, training and logistic support for the Navy's E-6B Mercury aircraft fleet. TACAMO was the first Navy Air Wing fully integrated on an Air Force base, carrying out a Navy mission in joint operations.

On 3 May 1999, a deadly tornado caused extensive damage to the northwest corner of the base and surrounding communities. For many days afterwards, Tinker personnel helped by providing shelters, search and rescue, and clean-up efforts.

The Oklahoma Maintenance, Repair & Overhaul Technology Center (MROTC), a public-private partnership, was started in 2003. MROTC is managed by Battelle Oklahoma and owned by Oklahoma Industries Authority (OIA), a public trust housed in the offices of the Oklahoma City Chamber of Commerce. The first hangars were completed in 2007.

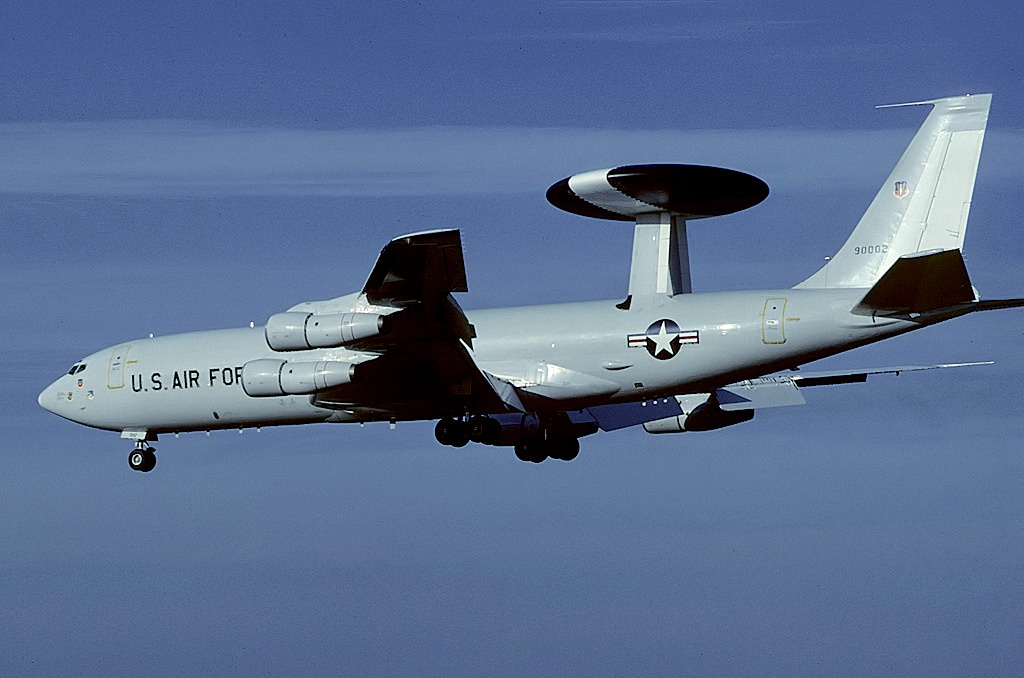
Boeing E-3A Sentry (later upgraded to an E-3B) of the 552nd Airborne Warning & Control Wing, seen in 1981.

Tinker celebrated the 30-year anniversary of the E-3 Sentry from 29 June to 1 July 2007. Past and present airmen were invited to swap stories and learn about the latest upgrades.

On 13 May 2008, Oklahoma County voters voted in favor of $71.5 million in general obligation bonds, the majority of which has been used to purchase the former General Motors Oklahoma City Assembly plant which is located on the southwest section of the base, next to the runway. A 50-year lease-purchase agreement was executed in September 2008 between Oklahoma County and the Air Force, covering the 3.8 million square foot (353,000 m^{2}) facility and surrounding acreage. Oklahoma County officials paid $55 million to buy the plant from General Motors, which is now called the Tinker Aerospace Complex.

From 2008 to 2015, the Oklahoma Air National Guard's 137th Air Refueling Wing also assumed an aerial refueling mission in accordance with the 2005 BRAC Recommendations. The then-137th Airlift Wing (ANG) relocated from Will Rogers Air National Guard Base to Tinker AFB, was redesignated as an air refueling wing, and associated with the 507 ARW while its C-130H aircraft were redistributed to other ANG airlift wings. In 2015, the 137th ended its associate relationship with the 507th, was redesignated as the 137th Special Operations Wing (137 SOW), and returned to Will Rogers ANGB, where it operates the MC-12 Liberty aircraft, operationally gained by Air Force Special Operations Command (AFSOC).

In 2015, it was announced that the Tinker was in the running for a squadron of the new KC-46A Pegasus. In October, it was announced that the base would not be receiving the plane, which instead was given to the 916th Air Refueling Wing at Seymour Johnson Air Force Base. Tinker was also in competition with Westover Air Reserve Base and Grissom Air Reserve Base for the plane.

=== March 1948 Tornadoes ===
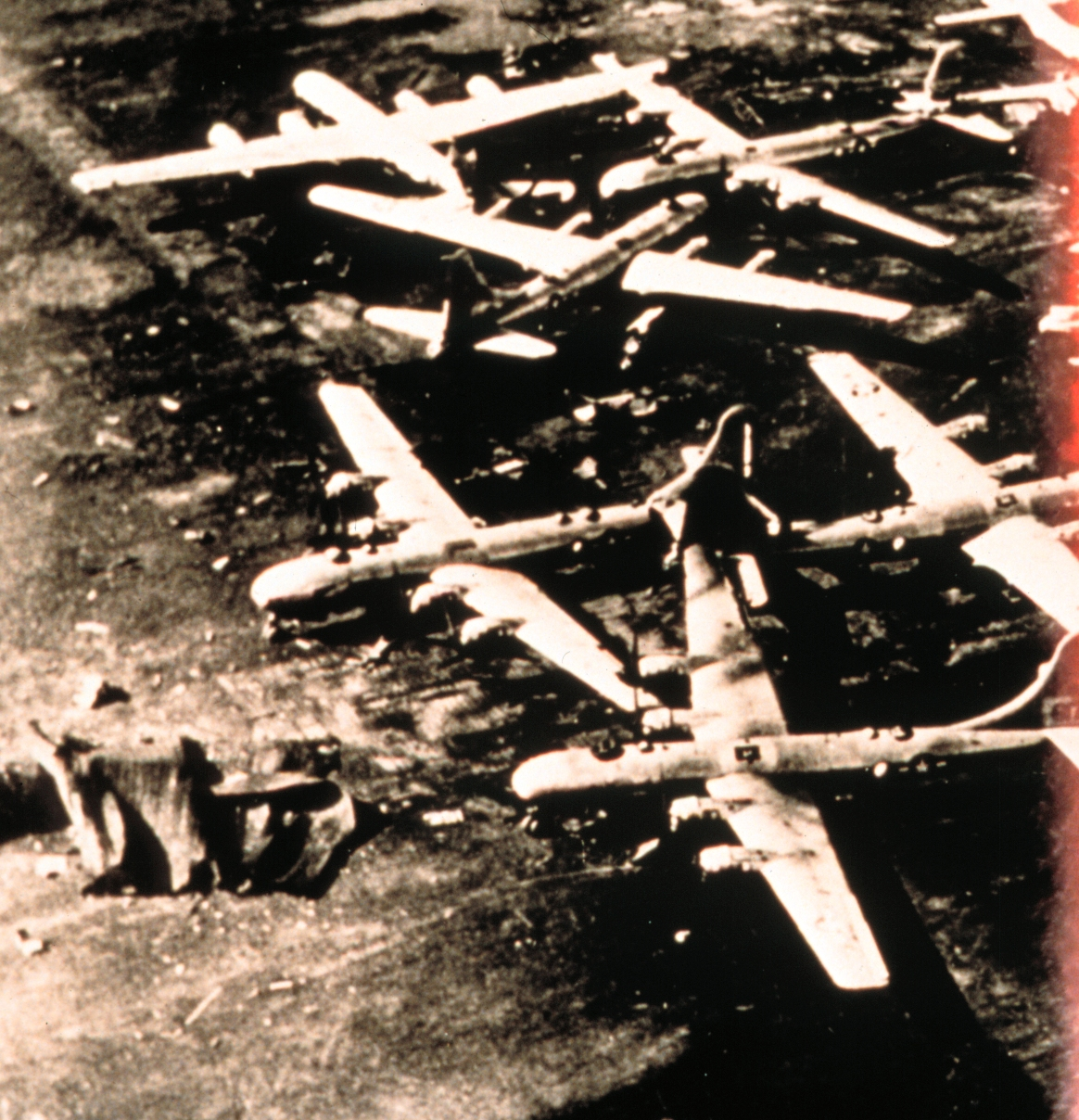
Superfortresses tossed about like toys at Tinker Air Force Base by the 20 March tornado.

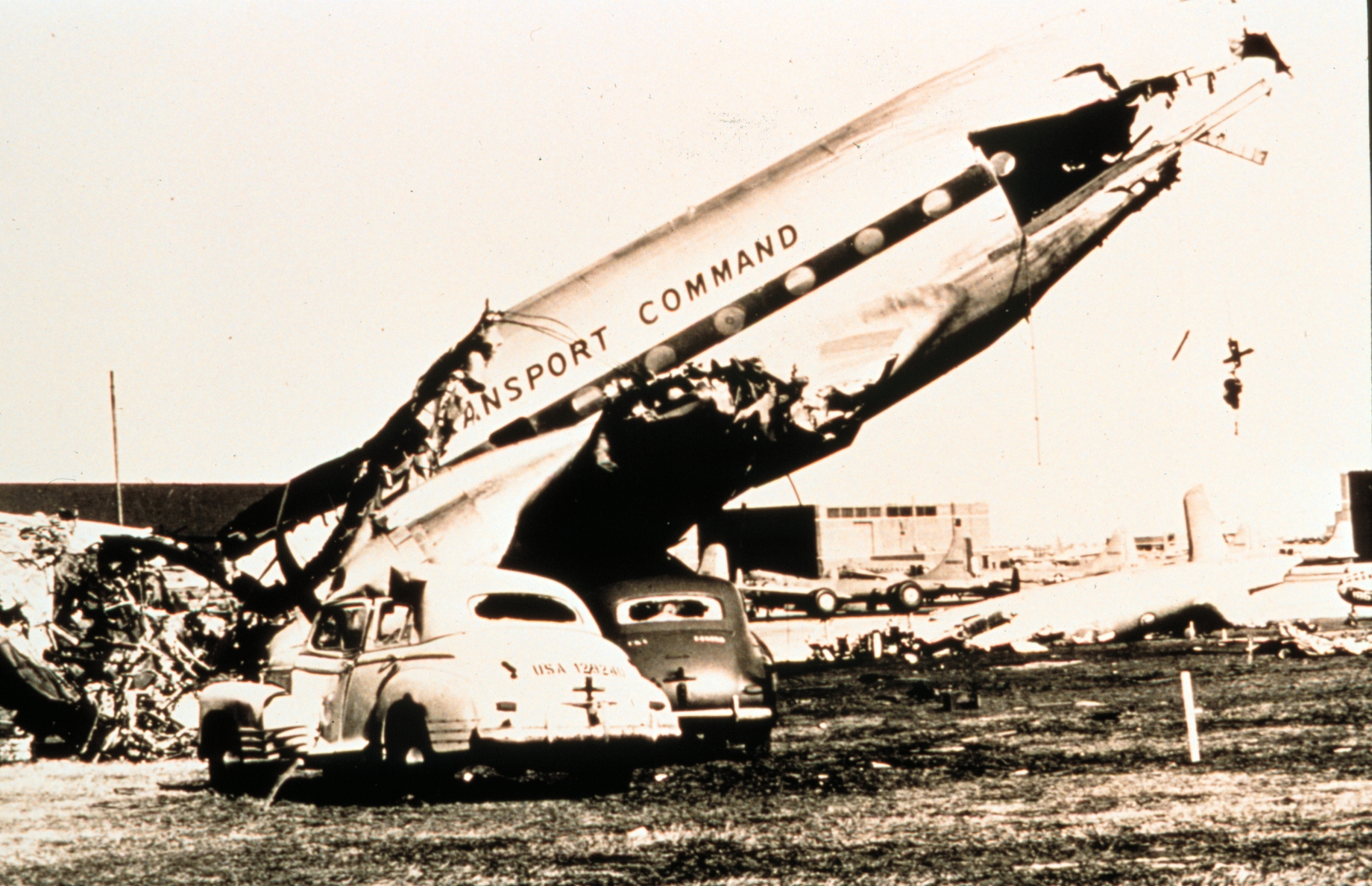
Damage to airplanes and cars from the 25 March tornado at Tinker Air Force Base.

Two large tornadoes struck Tinker Air Force Base, Oklahoma City, Oklahoma, damaging or destroying a large number of aircraft including at least two Douglas C-54 Skymasters, a Douglas C-47 Skytrain, and many Boeing B-29 Superfortresses stored from World War II. In the first storm, "54 aircraft were destroyed, including 17 C-54 transports valued at $500,000 apiece. Also destroyed were 15 P-47 fighters and two B-29 bombers. About 50 other planes were damaged and about 100 vehicles were damaged or destroyed." In the second tornado, "84 planes were hit, 35 of which were destroyed. These included 18 B-29s, 8 P-47s, 20 B-17s, and 3 C-47s. Hangars and other buildings were destroyed." Other types destroyed included Beechcraft AT-11s and Fairchild PT-19s and PT-26 Cornells. Damage from the second tornado was estimated at $6,100,000. Total damages for both storms was estimated at $16,350,000.

=== Major commands ===
- Air Service Comd, 1 March 1942 – 17 July 1944
- AAF Materiel and Services, 17 July 1944 – 31 August 1944
- AAF Technical Service Comd, 31 August 1944 – 1 July 1945
- Air Technical Service Comd, 1 July 1945 – 9 March 1946
- Air Materiel Comd, 9 March 1946 – 1 April 1961
- Air Force Logistics Command, 1 April 1961 – 1 July 1992
- Air Force Materiel Command, 1 July 1992 – present

=== Base operating units ===
- OCAD (Oklahoma City Air Depot) Liaison Staff, 1 March 1942 – 15 February 1943
- 497th Base HQ and Base HQ Sq, 15 February 1943 – 1 April 1944
- 4136th AAF Base Unit, 1 April 1944 – 26 September 1947
- 4136th AF Base Unit, 26 September 1947 – 28 August 1948
- 2919th Area Supply Gp, 28 August 1948 – 15 March 1951
- 2944th Depot Training Wg, 15 March 1951 – 15 July 1953
- 2854th Air Base Wg, 15 July 1953 – 16 October 1964
- 2854th Air Base Gp, 16 October 1964 – 1 October 1994
- 72 Air Base Wing, 1 October 1994 – present

=== Major units assigned ===
- OK City Air Depot 1 March 1942 – 3 January 1955
- 323rd Bomb Group 9 September 1947 – 17 March 1951
- 456th Bomb Group 26 September 1947 – 17 March 1951
- 323rd Bomb Wing 27 June 1949 – 28 March 1951
- 506th Strategic Fighter Wing 20 March 1955 – 1 April 1959
- 1707 Air Transport Wing 1 June 1959 – 8 January 1966
- 443rd Military Airlift Wing 8 January 1966 – 5 May 1969

== Role and operations ==
Tinker AFB is home to major Department of Defense, Air Force and Navy units with national defense missions.

=== Air Force and related entities ===
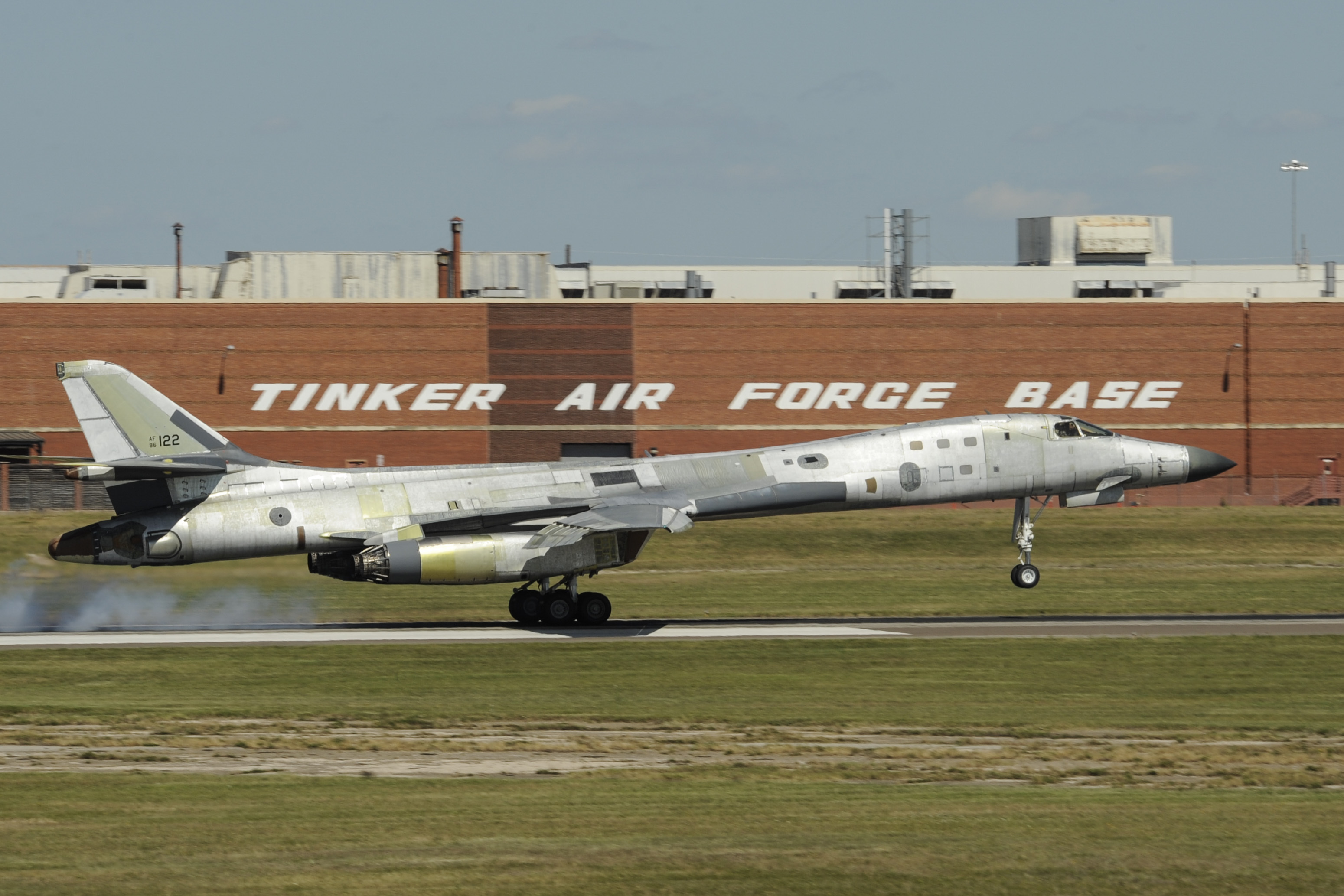
A mostly natural metal B-1B Lancer landing at the end of a post-maintenance check-flight at Tinker AFB during 2017. The large building behind forms part of the Oklahoma City Air Logistics Complex.

The Oklahoma City Air Logistics Complex is the largest air logistics center in the Air Force Materiel Command. It provides depot maintenance, product support, services and supply chain management, and information support for 31 weapon systems, 10 commands, 93 Air Force bases and 46 foreign nations. It is the contracting office for the Air Force's Contract Field Teams program.

The Air Logistics Complex includes the 76 Aircraft Maintenance Group, the 76 Propulsion Maintenance Group, the 76 Commodities Maintenance Group, the 76 Software Engineering Group and the 76 Maintenance Support Group. Combined, these groups provide depot-level maintenance, repair and overhaul of KC-135, B-52, E-3, E-6, and B-1 aircraft, as well as engines, components, support equipment, and associated software for the US Air Force and US Navy.

The 72nd Air Base Wing is a multi-unit, multi-mission wing that includes base services and support for the Oklahoma City Air Logistics Center, associate organizations, dependents, and retirees.

The 38th Cyberspace Engineering Group, Air Force Space Command, has worldwide responsibility for engineering, installation, and interoperability of all communications and electronic facilities for the Air Force.

Oklahoma Wing Civil Air Patrol Headquarters is located at the base ops building and provides state-level support to the 17 units across the state. The Flying Castle Composite Squadron is a Civil Air Patrol squadron that is composed of cadet and senior members that meet Tuesday evenings.

The 552nd Air Control Wing flies Air Combat Command's E-3 Sentry AWACS aircraft. The E-3's radar and other sensors provide deep-look surveillance, warning, interception control and airborne battle management. The 552 ACW encompasses 3 groups: 552nd Operations Group, 552nd Maintenance Group and 552nd Air Control Group.

The 507th Air Refueling Wing of the Air Force Reserve Command (AFRC) is one of two Air Force Reserve flying units in the state of Oklahoma and administratively reports to Fourth Air Force (4 AF). The wing operates twelve KC-135R "Stratotanker" air refueling aircraft at Tinker and is operationally gained by Air Mobility Command (AMC). As an associate unit, the 507 ARW also operates the Federal Aviation Administration's (FAA) British Aerospace 125-800 aircraft (ex-USAF C-29A) in the aviation standards and navigational aid inspection mission.

=== Navy and other defense agencies ===
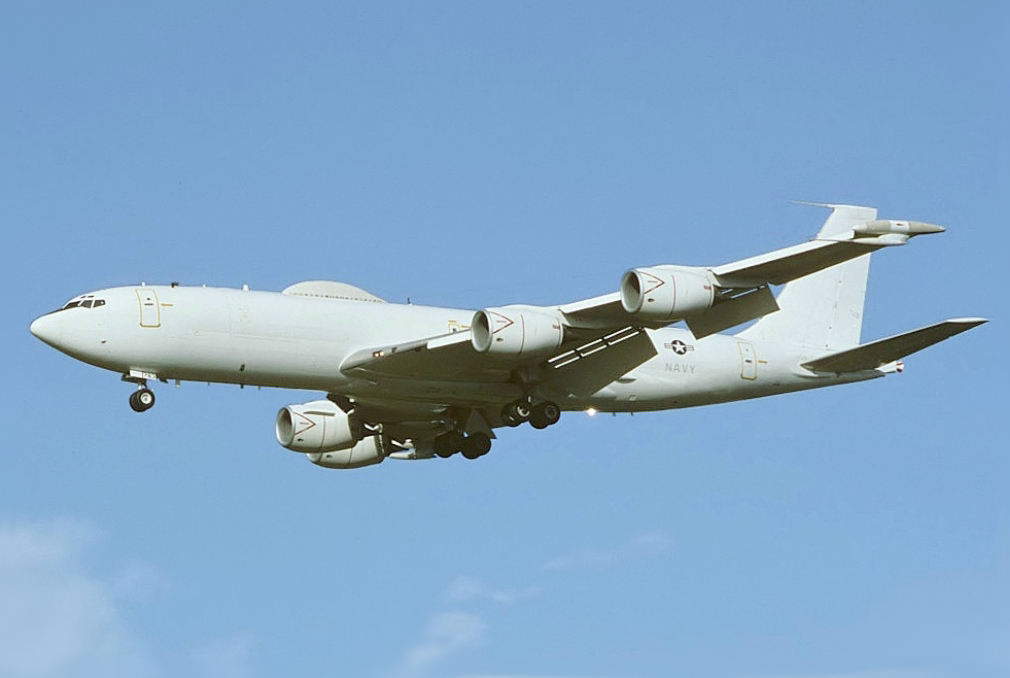
A Boeing E-6B Mercury of US Navy Strategic Communications Wing ONE based at Tinker AFB.

The United States Navy's Strategic Communications Wing One consists of three squadrons and a wing staff, and employs over 1,300 active-duty sailors and 100 contractors to provide maintenance, security, operations, administration, training and logistic support for the E-6 Mercury aircraft fleet. The E-6B Mercury enables the president of the United States and the Secretary of Defense to directly contact submarines, bombers and missile silos enforcing the country's national security through nuclear deterrence. The wing also operates alert facilities for E-6B aircraft at Travis AFB, California and Naval Air Station Patuxent River, Maryland.

Defense Mega Center Oklahoma City is the local branch of the Defense Information Systems Agency. The Mega center operates computer systems for the base and serves 110 other bases in 46 states.

Tinker has on-base several offices of the Defense Logistics Agency, the agency that provides supplies to the military services and supports their acquisition and transportation of repair parts and other materials.

- DLA Aviation has two offices at Tinker Air Force Base, DLA Aviation Customer Operations commanded by COL Rex Adee, USAF, and DLA Strategic Acquisitions at Tinker AFB, under Frances Evans, acting director, DLR Procurement Operations.
- DLA Distribution Oklahoma City provides the receipt, storage, issue, inspection and shipment of material, including material quality control, preservation and packaging, inventory, transportation functions and pick up and delivery services in support of the Oklahoma City Air Logistics Center, other tenants at Tinker Air Force Base, and other global customers. Support to the Air Logistics Center is primarily for programmed depot maintenance for aircraft and engines. The majority of the items shipped from Oklahoma City are destined for "customers" on base including the 552nd Air Control Wing, the U.S. Navy Strategic Communications Wing One, the 507th Air Refueling Wing and the 3rd Combat Communications Group.
- DLA Document Services provides a full portfolio of document services including traditional offset printing, on-demand printing, and online document services. DLA Document Services locations in Oklahoma include Fort Sill in Lawton, Oklahoma, the McAlester Army Ammunition Plant, and Tinker AFB.

=== Public/private partnerships ===
Community support for Tinker can be seen by the establishment of two public/private partnerships that support base operations by using local dollars to make available additional facilities for base use. While these partnerships are technically separate facilities, Tinker's security perimeter is extended around these facilities.

==== Maintenance Repair and Overhaul Technology Center (MROTC) ====
The first of the public/private partnerships is The Oklahoma Maintenance, Repair and Overhaul Technology Center (MROTC), managed by Battelle Oklahoma, owned by Oklahoma Industries Authority (OIA), and partners with the Department of Defense to provide a national center for technical solutions to aging commercial and military aircraft. The MROTC is a 370-acre (1.5 km^{2}) MRO facility, on the southeast side of Tinker AFB, sharing runways and security with the base. The MROTC complex is planned as a major military and commercial aircraft facility with 17 hangars and more than one million square feet of related industrial space and education and training facilities. The facility currently houses three hangars, one leased by Boeing (designed to accommodate Boeing 767-400 class aircraft), a second hangar for 767 for lease, and a third hangar designed to accommodate Boeing 707-300 class aircraft.

==== Building 9001 (Tinker Aerospace Complex) ====
The second of the public-private partnerships is Building 9001, originally known as the Tinker Aerospace Complex housed in the former General Motors Oklahoma City Assembly Plant located west of the runway on the south side of the base, north of I-240. A 50-year lease-purchase agreement was executed in September 2008 between Oklahoma County and the Air Force, covering the 2.5 million square foot (353,000 m^{2}) facility and 407-acre (1.65 km^{2}). Previously, the largest single building at the base was Building 3001 at 1,300,000 square feet (120,000 m^{2}). Tinker has leased about 4/5 of the facility and will host some current 76th Maintenance Wing operations as well as other Department of Defense missions, including work on the C-17 engines, joint strike fighter engines and core work on the new KC-46 tanker. Work being transferred to the complex is currently being done at 69 separate facilities on base, many of which are World War II-era temporary buildings located in runway clear zones. Burlington Northern Santa Fe provides a rail spur into the complex.

In 2014 Oklahoma County agreed to issue $10 million in bonds to help finance the purchase of a 156-acre (0.63 km^{2}) BNSF Railway marshaling yard, just north of the TAC building.

In addition to providing space for the work of the Oklahoma City Air Logistics Center, the Tinker Aerospace Complex can also be used to house public/private business partnerships. Currently, there are three programs. The Cooperative Research and Development Partnership has the objective of advancing science and technology to meet Air Force requirements and transferring technology into the commercial marketplace (CRADA, governed by Title 15 USC 3710a). Public-Private Partnerships, or statutory partnering, is where the government acts as a seller to private industry in either a direct sales agreement, Workshare Partnering Agreement, or a Facilities Use Agreement (governed by Title 10 USC 2474). Finally, the Enhanced Use Lease requires Congressional approval and full fair market value rent for underutilized Air Force assets (governed by 10 USC 2667).

== Based units ==
Flying and notable non-flying units based at Tinker Air Force Base.

Units marked GSU are Geographically Separate Units, which although based at Tinker, are subordinate to a parent unit based at another location.

=== United States Air Force ===
Air Force Materiel Command (AFMC)

- 72nd Air Base Wing (Host wing)
  - Headquarters 72nd Air Base Wing
    - 72nd Communications Directorate
    - 72nd Civil Engineering Directorate
    - 72nd Operations Support Squadron
    - 72nd Comptroller Squadron
  - 72nd Medical Group
    - 72nd Medical Support Squadron
    - 72nd Healthcare Operations Squadron
    - 72nd Operational Medical Readiness Squadron
  - 72nd Mission Support Group
    - 72nd Force Support Squadron
    - 72nd Logistics Readiness Squadron
    - 72nd Security Forces Squadron
  - Headquarters Air Force Sustainment Center
  - 448th Supply Chain Management Wing
    - Headquarters 448th Supply Chain Management Wing
    - 848th Supply Chain Management Group
      - 421st Supply Chain Management Squadron
      - 422nd Supply Chain Management Squadron
      - 423rd Supply Chain Management Squadron
      - 424th Supply Chain Management Squadron
    - 948th Supply Chain Management Group
      - 420th Supply Chain Management Squadron
      - 429th Supply Chain Management Squadron
      - 430th Supply Chain Management Squadron
      - 431st Supply Chain Management Squadron
  - Oklahoma City Air Logistics Complex
    - Aerospace Sustainment Directorate
    - 76th Aircraft Maintenance Group
      - Engineering Branch
      - Quality Assurance Office
      - Production Operations Branch
      - 564th Aircraft Maintenance Squadron
      - 565th Aircraft Maintenance Squadron
      - 566th Aircraft Maintenance Squadron
      - 567th Aircraft Maintenance Squadron
      - 568th Aircraft Maintenance Squadron
      - 569th Aircraft Maintenance Squadron
    - 76th Commodities Maintenance Group
      - Engineering Branch
      - Quality Assurance Office
      - Production Operations Branch
      - 550th Commodities Maintenance Squadron
      - 551st Commodities Maintenance Squadron
      - 552nd Commodities Maintenance Squadron
      - 553rd Commodities Maintenance Squadron
    - 76th Propulsion Maintenance Group
      - Engineering Branch
      - Quality Assurance Office
      - Production Operations Office
      - 544th Propulsion Maintenance Squadron
      - 546th Propulsion Maintenance Squadron
      - 547th Propulsion Maintenance Squadron
      - 548th Propulsion Maintenance Squadron
    - 76th Software Engineering Group
      - Engineering Branch
      - Production Operations Branch
      - 555th Software Engineering Squadron
      - 556th Software Engineering Squadron
      - 557th Software Engineering Squadron
      - 558th Software Engineering Squadron
      - 559th Software Engineering Squadron
    - 76th Maintenance Support Group
      - Engineering Branch
      - Production Operations Branch
      - Production Support
      - 76th Maintenance Support Squadron
      - 776th Maintenance Support Squadron
- Air Force Life Cycle Management Center
  - Detachment 11 (GSU)
  - Propulsion Directorate (GSU)
    - Propulsion Sustainment Division
    - Propulsion Integration Division
  - Digital Directorate
    - E-3 AWACS Division (GSU)
  - Bombers Directorate
    - B-1 Lancer Division (GSU)
    - B-52 Stratofortress Division (GSU)
  - Mobility & Training Aircraft Directorate
    - Legacy Tanker Division (GSU)
  - Presidential & Executive Airlift Directorate
    - Commercial Derivative Aircraft Division (GSU)

Air Combat Command (ACC)

- Fifteenth Air Force
  - 552nd Air Control Wing
    - Headquarters 552nd Air Control Wing
      - 552nd Air Control Group
        - 552nd Air Control Networks Squadron
        - 752nd Operations Support Squadron
      - 552nd Operations Group
        - 960th Airborne Air Control Squadron – E-3B/C/G Sentry
        - 963rd Airborne Air Control Squadron – E-3G Sentry
        - 964th Airborne Air Control Squadron – E-3G Sentry
        - 965th Airborne Air Control Squadron – E-3G Sentry
      - 552nd Maintenance Group
        - 552nd Aircraft Maintenance Squadron
        - 552nd Maintenance Squadron
        - 552nd Maintenance Operations Flight
      - 552nd Training Group
        - 552nd Training Squadron
        - 966th Airborne Air Control Squadron - E-3G Sentry
- Sixteenth Air Force
  - 688th Cyberspace Wing
    - 38th Cyberspace Engineering Installation Group (GSU)
      - 38th Engineering Squadron
      - 38th Operations Support Squadron

Air Force Field Operating Agencies

- Air Force Flight Standards Agency
  - Flight Operations and Policy Standards Directorate
    - Flight Directives Division
    - Safety of Navigation Division
    - Navigation Systems Division
    - Advanced Instrument School
  - Airfield Operations Directorate
  - ATCALS Maintenance Directorate
  - Plans and Readiness Directorate
  - Cyber Operations Directorate
  - Sustainment Directorate
  - Programs and Requirements Directorate

Air Force Reserve Command (AFRC)

- Fourth Air Force
  - 507th Air Refueling Wing
    - Headquarters 507th Air Refueling Wing
    - 507th Medical Squadron
    - 507th Operations Group
      - 465th Air Refueling Squadron – KC-135R Stratotanker
      - 507th Operations Support Squadron
    - 507th Maintenance Group
      - 507th Aircraft Maintenance Squadron
      - 507th Maintenance Squadron
    - 507th Mission Support Group
      - 72nd Aerial Port Squadron
      - 507th Civil Engineer Squadron
      - 507th Communications Flight
      - 507th Force Support Squadron
      - 507th Logistics Readiness Squadron
      - 507th Security Forces Squadron
- Tenth Air Force
  - 513th Air Control Group
    - 513th Operations Support Flight
    - 513th Aircraft Maintenance Squadron
    - 513th Maintenance Squadron
    - 970th Airborne Air Control Squadron – E-3G Sentry
  - 960th Cyberspace Wing
    - 860th Cyberspace Operations Group
      - 35th Combat Communications Squadron (GSU)

Civil Air Patrol (CAP)

- Southwest Region
  - Oklahoma Wing
    - Oklahoma Wing HQ Staff Squadron (OK-001)
    - Flying Castle Composite Squadron (OK-008)

=== United States Navy ===
Commander, Naval Air Forces (COMNAVAIRFOR)

- Strategic Communications Wing ONE
  - Fleet Air Reconnaissance Squadron THREE (VQ-3) – E-6B Mercury
  - Fleet Air Reconnaissance Squadron FOUR (VQ-4) – E-6B Mercury
  - Fleet Air Reconnaissance Squadron SEVEN (VQ-7) – E-6B Mercury
  - TACAMO Weapons School

Commander, Navy Reserve Forces Command (COMNAVRESFOR)

- Navy Reserve Center - Oklahoma City

== Base housing ==
There is on-base housing that is managed by a private company.

Residents on Tinker AFB are zoned to Mid-Del School District. The zoned schools are Tinker Elementary School, Jarmen Junior High School, and Midwest City High School.

== See also ==
- 33rd Air Division (United States)
- Air Force Materiel Command
- Central Air Defense Force (Air Defense Command)
- Oklahoma World War II Army Airfields
- Tinker Federal Credit Union

== Other sources ==
- This article incorporates public domain material from the Air Force Historical Research Agency
- Much of this text in an early version of this article was taken from pages on the Tinker Air Force Base Website, which as a work of the U.S. Government is presumed to be a public domain resource. That information was supplemented by:
- Mueller, Robert (1989). Active Air Force Bases Within the United States of America on 17 September 1982. USAF Reference Series, Maxwell AFB, Alabama: Office of Air Force History. ISBN 0-912799-53-6
- Ravenstein, Charles A. (1984). Air Force Combat Wings Lineage and Honors Histories 1947–1977. Maxwell AFB, Alabama: Office of Air Force History. ISBN 0-912799-12-9.
