= Oklahoma Wing Civil Air Patrol =

- Oklahoma Wing of Civil Air Patrol

Associated branches
- United States Air Force

Command staff
- Commander: Col David McCollum

Current statistics
- Cadets: 275
- Seniors: 390
- Total Membership: 665
- Website: okwg.cap.gov
- Statistics as of 2021

The Oklahoma Wing of the Civil Air Patrol (CAP) is the highest echelon of Civil Air Patrol in the state of Oklahoma. Oklahoma Wing headquarters are located at Tinker Air Force Base near Oklahoma City. The Oklahoma Wing consists of over 650 cadet and adult members at over 16 locations across the state of Oklahoma.

== Mission ==
The Oklahoma Wing performs the three missions of Civil Air Patrol: providing emergency services; offering cadet programs for youth; and providing aerospace education for both CAP members and the general public.

=== Emergency services ===
Civil Air Patrol provides emergency services, which includes performing search and rescue and disaster relief missions; as well as assisting in humanitarian aid assignments. CAP also provides Air Force support through conducting light transport, communications support, and low-altitude route surveys. Civil Air Patrol can also offer support to counter-drug missions.

In May 2013, the Oklahoma Wing undertook its first ever large scale, ground-based photo reconnaissance mission for FEMA following the Moore, Oklahoma tornado. Over 15,000 high resolution photographs were provided to FEMA to aid in the agency's damage assessment efforts.

=== Cadet programs ===
Civil Air Patrol offers a cadet program for youth aged 12 to 21, which includes aerospace education, leadership training, physical fitness and moral leadership.

=== Aerospace education ===
Civil Air Patrol offers aerospace education for CAP members and the general public, including providing training to the members of CAP, and offering workshops for youth throughout the nation through schools and public aviation events.

== Organization ==
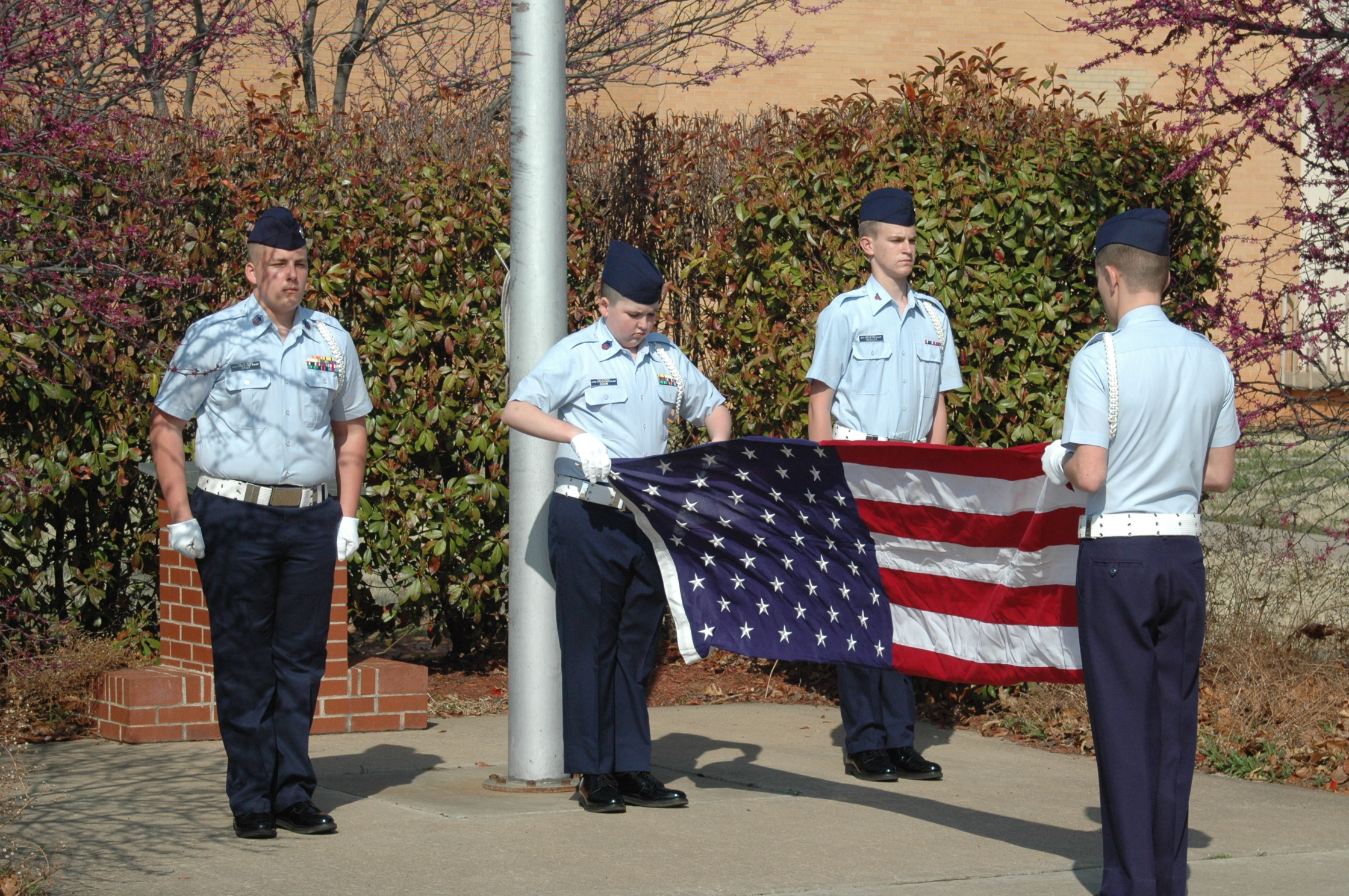
A color guard from the Grove Composite Squadron render honors to the United States Flag at an event.

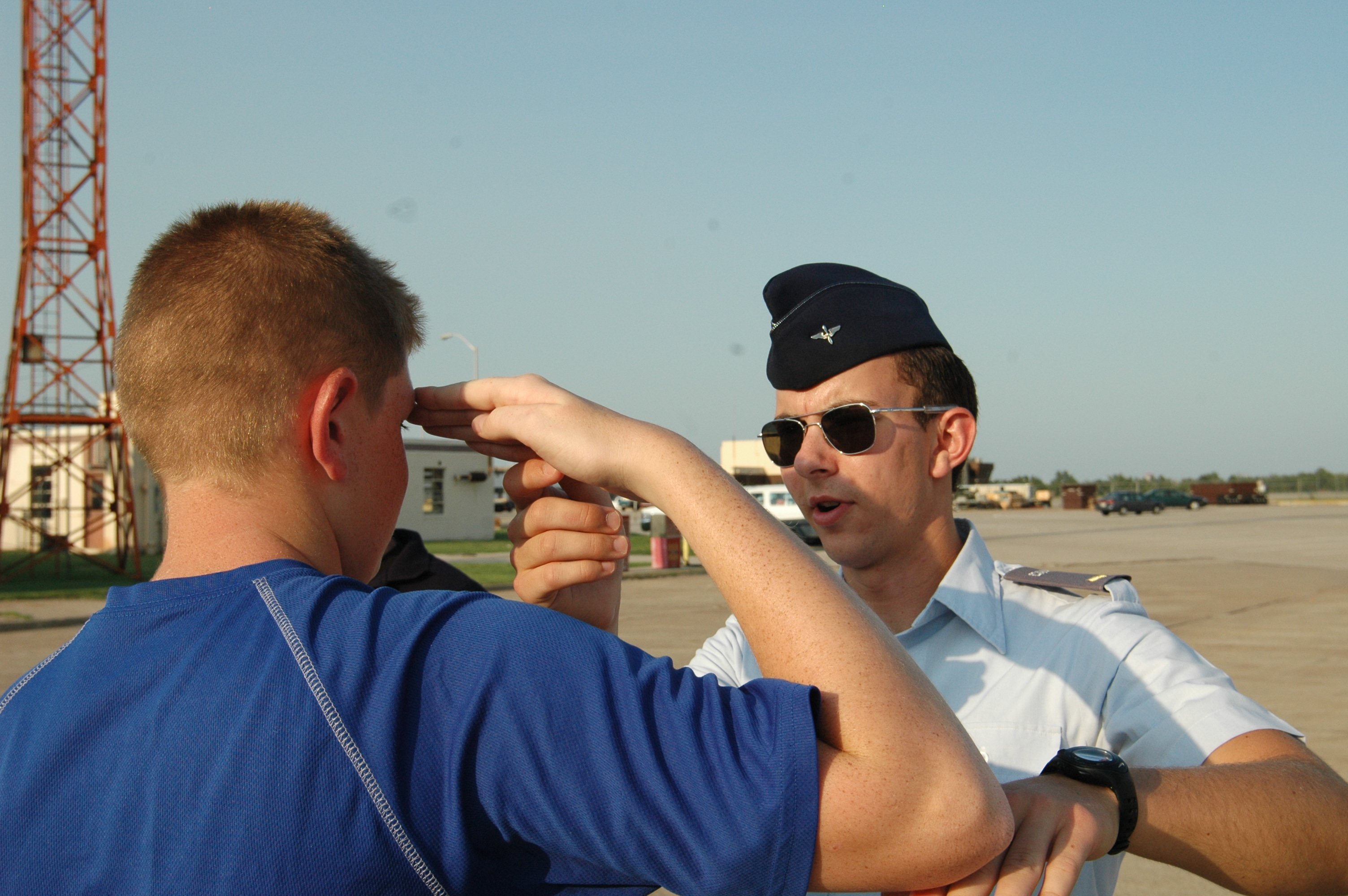
A Civil Air Patrol 2nd Lt. from the Oklahoma Wing gives pointers to a new CAP recruit on the proper way to salute during a formation at their weekly meeting.

Squadrons of the Oklahoma Wing
Designation	Squadron Name	Location	Notes
OK155	Broken Arrow Composite Squadron	Broken Arrow	
OK074	Cleveland County Composite Squadron	Norman	
OK115	Lawton-Ft.Sill Composite Squadron	Lawton	
OK125	Council Oak Senior Squadron	Tulsa	
OK075	Durant-Eaker Field Composite Squadron	Durant	
OK002	Edmond Composite Squadron	Edmond	
OK110	Enid Composite Squadron	Vance Air Force Base	
OK008	Flying Castle Composite Squadron	Tinker Air Force Base	
OK123	Grove Composite Squadron	Grove	
OK035	Jackson County Composite Squadron	Altus Air Force Base	
OK024	Muskogee Nighthawks Squadron	Muskogee	
OK113	Oklahoma City Composite Squadron	Oklahoma City	
OK092	Riverside Composite Squadron	Jenks	
OK151	Starbase Composite Squadron	Tulsa	
OK103	Stillwater Composite Squadron	Stillwater	
OK086	Gordon Cooper Composite Squadron	Shawnee	
OK116	Woodward Composite Squadron	Woodward	
OK001	Oklahoma Wing HQ Staff Squadron	Tinker Air Force Base	

== See also ==
- Oklahoma Air National Guard
- Oklahoma State Guard
