= LOGCAP =

Contingency program administered by the US Army

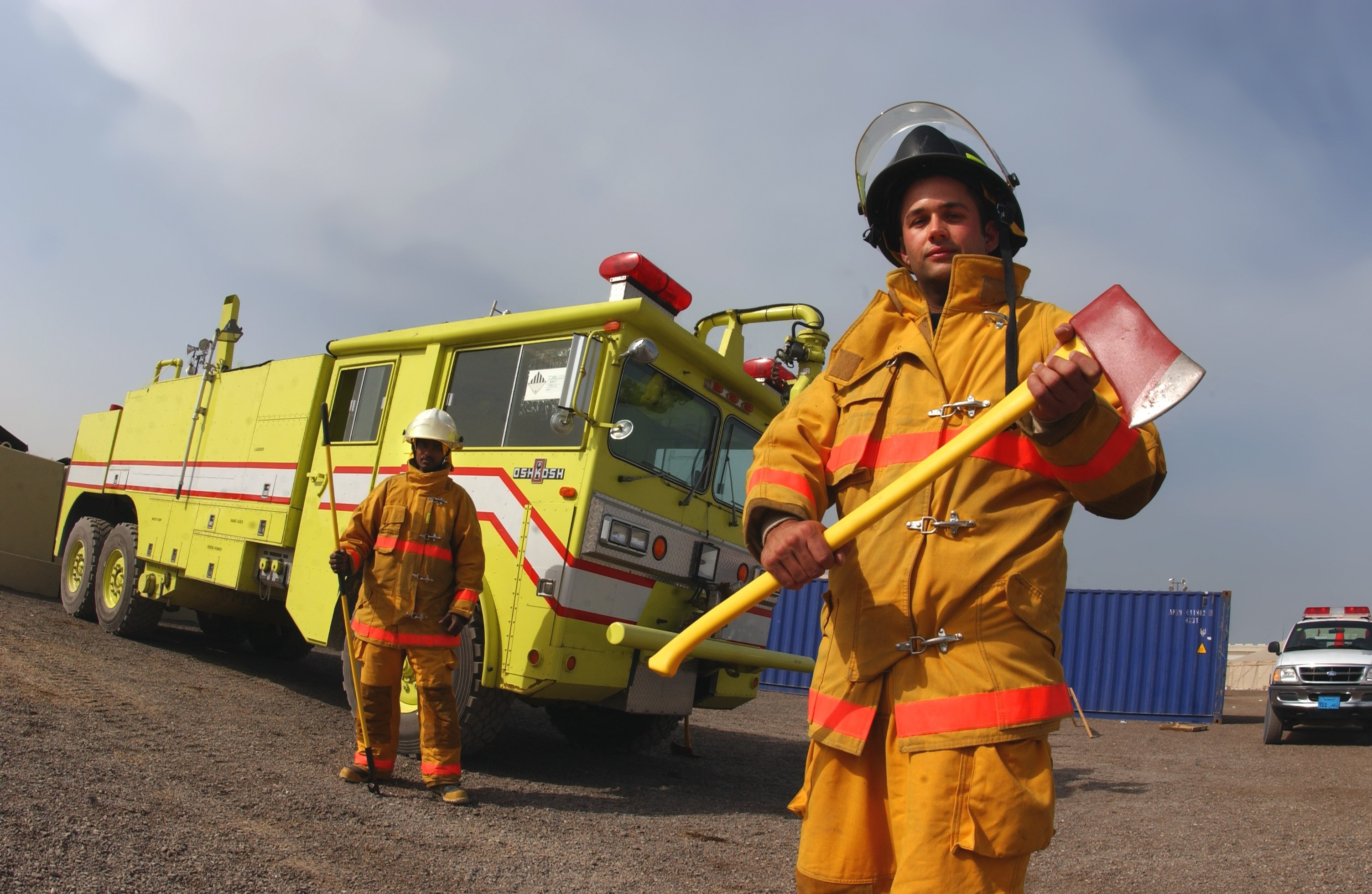
Fire protection is an important service provided by LOGCAP. Under LOGCAP III, 78.9 million bags of laundry have been cleaned, 1.1 billion meals prepared, 239.2 million patrons visited MWR (Morale, Welfare and Recreation) facilities. (May 2010)

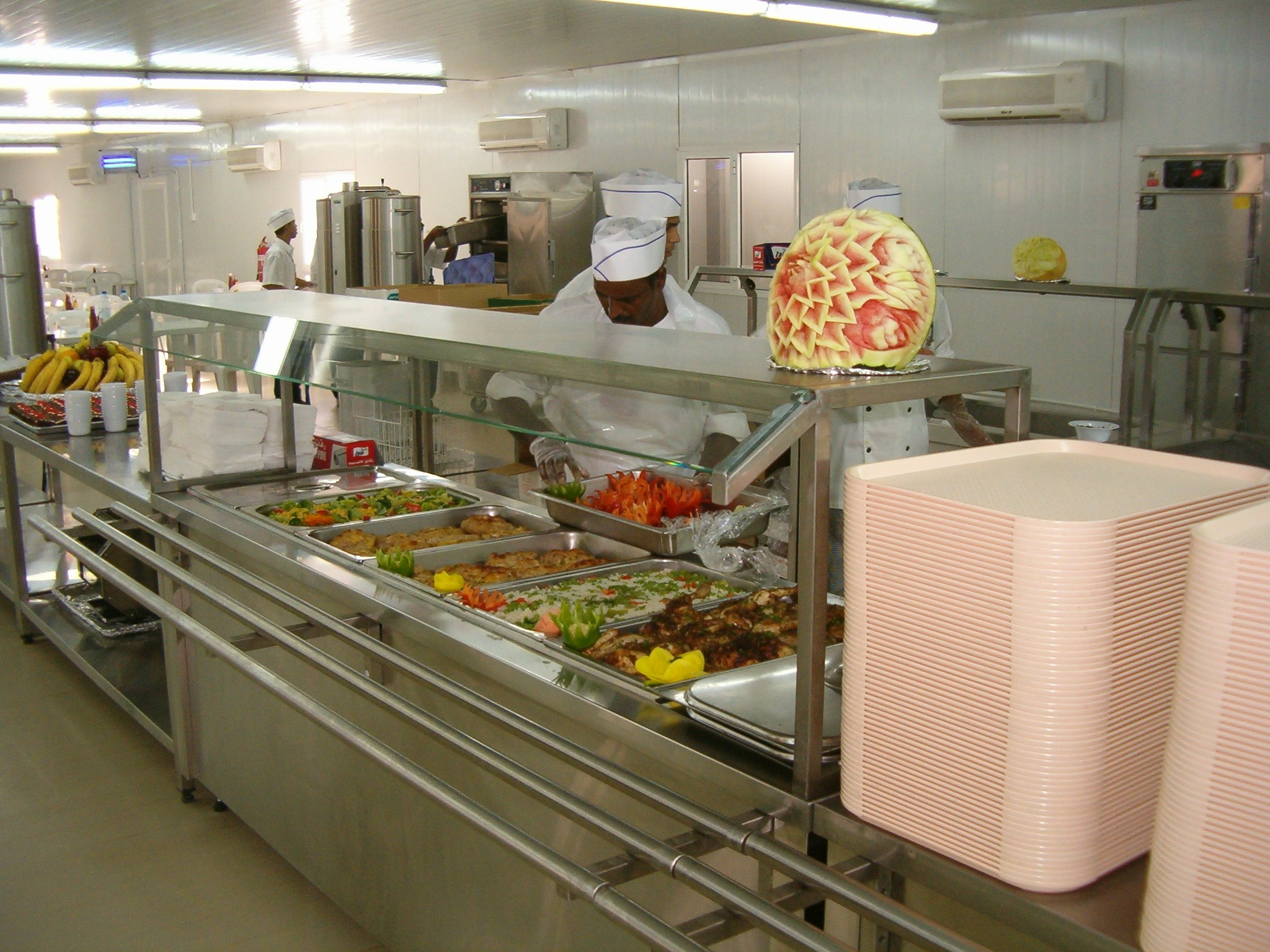
Food service is a crucial service provided by LOGCAP. Under LOGCAP III, 78.9 million bags of laundry have been cleaned, 1.1 billion meals prepared, 239.2 million patrons visited MWR facilities, and 449.2 million pounds of mail handled. (May 2010)

The Logistics Civil Augmentation Program (LOGCAP) is a program administered by the US Army to provide contingency support to augment the Army force structure. The first three contracts (and all task orders under them) were awarded to a single bidder in each round of competition (KBR for the first and third contracts and DynCorp for the second contract). The fourth contract, awarded in June 2007, was split between three companies (KBR, DynCorp, and Fluor Corporation) with each company having the opportunity to compete for task orders. The fifth contract, awarded in April 2019, is split between four companies (KBR, Vectrus, Fluor, and the PAE-Parsons partnership).

== Organization ==
- Logistics Civil Augmentation Program (LOGCAP) Support Brigade, at Rock Island Arsenal (IL)
  - 1st LOGCAP Support Battalion, at Fort Belvoir (VA)
  - 2nd LOGCAP Support Battalion, at Rock Island Arsenal (IL)
  - 3rd LOGCAP Support Battalion, in Birmingham (AL)
  - 4th LOGCAP Support Battalion, in Athens (GA)
  - 5th LOGCAP Support Battalion, in Sheffield (AL)

== History ==
In 1985, LOGCAP was established primarily to plan for contingencies and to leverage the existing civilian resources. However, it was not until three years later before it was first used. In support of a United States Third Army mission, the United States Army Corps of Engineers (USACE) used LOGCAP to contract for the construction and maintenance of two petroleum pipelines systems in Southwest Asia.

The current task order contract concept of LOGCAP began in August 1992 when USACE awarded the first contract (LOGCAP I) to Brown and Root Services (now KBR) in August 1992 as a cost-plus-award-fee contract, which was used in December that year to support the United Nations forces in Somalia. This contract was also used to support forces in Bosnia, Kosovo, Macedonia, Hungary, Saudi Arabia, Haiti, Italy and Rwanda.

The LOGCAP contract was recompeted in late 1996, with Army Materiel Command (AMC) taking over management of the program from USACE (although USACE has retained the support requirements for the Balkans Peninsula continuously since that date). The second contract (LOGCAP II) was awarded to DynCorp in January 1997. From 1997 to 2001, DynCorp supported US forces in the Philippines, Guatemala, Colombia, Ecuador, East Timor, and Panama.

AMC awarded LOGCAP III, the third contract, to KBR in 2001. LOGCAP III primarily supported the global war on terrorism in Iraq, Afghanistan, Kuwait, Djibouti, and Georgia.

However, as a result of the criticisms leveled against KBR for contract performance, AMC wanted to end the LOGCAP III contract in 2007, but continued it for contracts in Iraq until withdrawal of United States military forces was completed. The current contract (LOGCAP IV) differed greatly from its three predecessors, in that multiple contracts were awarded (to KBR, DynCorp, and Fluor), whereupon the three could compete for future task orders.

LOGCAP Contract Services
Direct Support/General Support (DS/GS) Operations	Field Services	Other Services
Class I (subsistence) Class II (clothing and equipment); Class III (petroleum); Class IV (construction material); Class V (ammunition); Class VI (personal demand items); Class VII (major end items); Class VIII (medical supplies); Class IX (repair parts)	Billeting Sanitation Food services Operations & Maintenance; Information operations Personnel and Admin; Laundry; Morale, welfare and recreation Mortuary affairs	Airfield Retrograde; Engineering and Construction; Power generation Information technology Transportation; Maintenance and motor pool Medical services Physical security

== Sister service organizations ==
The corresponding service organizations for the U.S. Air Force is the Air Force Contract Augmentation Program (AFCAP), and the U.S. Navy has the Navy Global Contingency Construction Contract (GCCC) and the Global Contingency Services Contract (GCSC).

== See also ==
- McElhatton, Jim (2014), "KBR contractor probed by Senate, House over documents silencing whistleblowers", Washington Times (published 20 November 2014)
- Schulberg, Jessica (2014), "The American Government Is Funding Human Trafficking: The ugly business of how military contractors find their workers", New Republic (published 14 November 2014)
- McElhatton, Jim (2014), "Iraq War logistics contract goes on years after withdrawal", Washington Times (published 8 July 2014)
- McElhatton, Jim (2013), "DOJ warns of fallout in Army-KBR contract dispute", Federal Times (published 4 June 2013), archived from the original on 18 January 2015
- Department of the Army (2012), "Logistics Civil Augmentation Program (LOGCAP)" (PDF), Army Regulation 700-137 (published 28 December 2012), archived from the original (PDF) on January 18, 2004
- Isenberg, David (2010), "The Perils of LOGCAP Job Seeking", Huffington Post (published 30 June 2010)
- Haraburda, Scott; et al. (2009), "Contracting Agility in LOGCAP-Kuwait", Army Logistician, vol. 41, no. 4, archived from the original on January 13, 2015
- Long, Jonathon D. (2008), "ACC KU Means Full Spectrum Contract Support" (PDF), Army AL&T., vol. PB 70-08-03, no. July–September, pp. 34–37, archived from the original (PDF) on July 22, 2011
- LeDoux, Karen E. (2005), "LOGCAP 101: An Operational Planner's Guide.", Army Logistician., vol. PB 700-05-03, no. May–June, pp. 24–29, archived from the original on September 27, 2006
- Department of the Army (2002), Logistics Civil Augmentation Program (LOGCAP) Support Contract: STATEMENT OF WORK, archived from the original on July 20, 2007
