= Standard Army Maintenance System – Enhanced =

U.S. logistics system

Standard Army Maintenance System-Enhanced (SAMS-E) SAMS-E is a United States Army Logistics Information System considered a mission critical system. It supports Combat Services Support (CSS) Table of Organization and Equipment (TO&E) unit-level maintenance elements, Field and Sustainment maintenance shop production activities, and Maintenance managers from the battalion to wholesale levels. MAT created SAMS-E after receiving the initial Army contract in 2004McLane Advanced Technologies (MAT) in Temple, Texas. On February 12, 2012, MAT announced the successful release of version 13.01.06 for SAMS-E.

History:

SAMS-E was developed by MAT after being awarded the initial contract in 2004 for modernizing the army's various computer programs (ULLS-G, SAMS-1, SAMS-2, and SAMS I/TDA). McLane also received follow-on contracts in 2006 and 2010 for product development. These two contracts totaled $143M.

== Technical Characteristics ==
- Operating systems: Windows 7 and Windows Server
- Database: Oracle
- Languages: C#, Visual Studio.NET
- Hardware: COTS notebooks, host, printer, and AIT equipment (handheld device, wireless access point, encoder/decoder)

== Applications ==
SAMS-E consists of SAMS-1E and SAMS-2E. Although not part of the SAMS they communicate with the SARSS system. It replaces and enhances the ULLS-G (Unit Level Logistics-Ground), Samson-1, and SAMS-2 legacy systems by:

- incorporating the Windows graphical user interface
- integrating the Windows operating system
- merging functionality of ULLS-G into SAMS-1.

This effort was a maintenance systems modernization initiative that allowed SAMS-E to act as a bridge between current functionality and future systems. SAMS-E modernizes the following functions:

- Automated unit-level maintenance, supply, and readiness reporting functions
- Day-to-day weapon system and sub-component readiness status
- Maintenance and related repair parts information
- Management functions from the tactical direct support (DS)/general support (GS) level maintenance activities and supports the transition to the Field and Sustainment Maintenance concept (Two-Levels of Maintenance)

SAMS-E will be replaced by the Global Combat Support System-Army.

== Variants ==
- McLane Maintenance Management System (MMS)-MMS is a commercial fleet management software program that builds upon MAT's knowledge in developing similar products for large customers like the US Army.

== See also ==
- Computerized maintenance management system
- Global Command and Control System
