= Contract field team =

Program of the United States Air Force

The Contract Field Teams program (also called Contractor Field Teams and commonly abbreviated CFT) is a program of the United States Air Force designed to provide temporary and long-term labor support for a variety of technical service needs; maintenance and repair, depot services, inspections, modernization for contingency support for aircraft, vehicles, weapon systems and other equipment. The CFT program is currently administered by the Oklahoma City Air Logistics Center at Tinker Air Force Base, and has been in place since 1951.

Seal of the Department of the Air Force

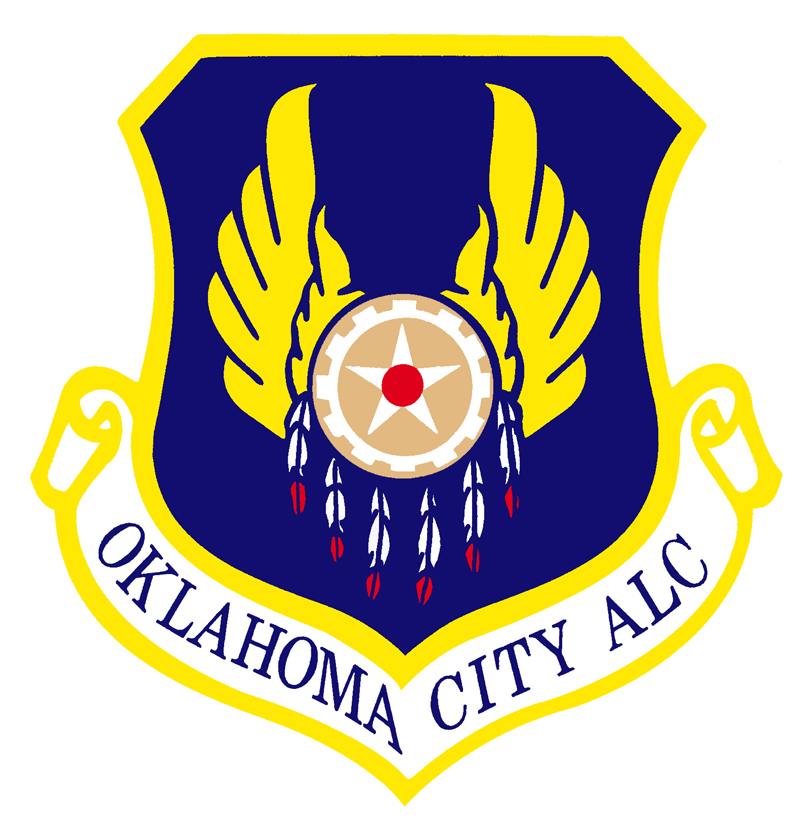
Oklahoma City Air Logistics Center Shield

The official USAF definition of CFT is: "A group of skilled contractor maintenance personnel who are provided with government furnished special tools, equipment, and supplies to accomplish maintenance on site at operational bases. The contractor provides supervision, people and hand tools."

Under the CFT program, a series of contracts is awarded to various contractors, from which separate task orders will later be issued. To win a CFT task order the contractor must be able to demonstrate that it can assemble the necessary personnel and deploy them to the directed site within a short time frame (generally 30 days from notification). The task orders may involve recurring effort (such as augmenting a depot workforce with certain skill positions for a specified period of time, usually an entire calendar year) or nonrecurring effort (such as installation of field kits on selected systems at a military installation). Usually all the contractors are eligible to bid on any task order; however, the USAF reserves the right to award a task order to a contractor without competition.

Although the program is administered by the USAF, all branches of the military are eligible to use the CFT program for their needs, as well as some civilian agencies.

== Current CFT Contractors (beginning 1 October 2008) ==
Eleven contractors (seven large businesses and four small businesses) were awarded contracts under the current CFT competition. This changed from the prior competition, which had no small-business set-aside and which had only four contract awards.

The four small business contracts are limited to CONUS support only, while the seven large business contracts can support either CONUS or OCONUS effort.

=== Large Business Awardees ===
- Amentum (formerly AECOM Management Services) (Contract No. FA8108-09-D-0001)
- Computer Sciences Corporation, Applied Technology Division (Contract No. FA8108-09-D-0002)
  - This division, based in Fort Worth, was formerly part of DynCorp when it was purchased by CSC, but when the DynCorp International division was later sold, this division was not part of the sale. It has since been purchased by PAE in 2013 (PAE was later owned by Lindsay Goldberg but is now part of Amentum).
- Defense Support Services (Contract No. FA8108-09-D-0003)
  - This company (known in the industry as DS2) was previously a joint venture of Lockheed Martin and Day & Zimmermann, but was purchased by PAE in October 2011.
  - DS2 held one of four contracts on the prior competition (those contracts ended 30 September 2008).
- DynCorp International (Contract No. FA8108-09-D-0004)
  - DynCorp International held one of the four contracts on the prior competition, and has held one CFT contract award in every competition since the program's inception in 1951. The company is now part of Amentum.
- L-3 Communications, Vertex Aerospace (Contract No. FA8108-09-D-0005)
  - L-3 held one of four contracts on the prior competition. In 2017 L3 sold Vertex.
- URS Federal Support Services (formerly known as Lear Siegler Services) (Contract No. FA8108-09-D-0006)
  - LSI held one of four contracts on the prior competition.
- Northrop Grumman Technical Services (Contract No. FA8108-09-D-0007)

=== Small Business Awardees ===
- Kay and Associates, Buffalo Grove, Illinois (Contract No. FA8108-09-D-0008)
- M1 Support Services, Denton, Texas (Contract No. FA8108-09-D-0009)
- MacAulay Brown, Dayton, Ohio (Contract No. FA8108-09-D-0010)
- VSE Corporation, Alexandria, Virginia (Contract No. FA8108-09-D-0011)
