= Global Linguist Solutions =

American translation company

Global Linguist Solutions, LLC
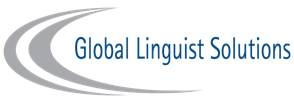
- Company type: Joint venture
- Industry: Translation; Language interpretation; Government services
- Founded: 2006
- Headquarters: Herndon, Virginia, United States
- Area served: Worldwide
- Key people: Thomas E. Fish, President and General Manager
- Owner: DynCorp International (51%); AECOM National Security Programs (49%)
- Website: www.gls-corp.com

Global Linguist Solutions (GLS) is an American professional services contracting company headquartered in Herndon, Virginia. GLS was the main provider of interpreters, translators, and linguistic support to the Iraq War.

== History ==
Global Linguist Solutions was founded in 2006 as a joint venture between DynCorp International and McNeil Technologies, with DynCorp as the majority partner. McNeil Technologies was acquired by AECOM Technology Corporation in August 2010 for $355M.

In December 2006, GLS was awarded a $4.6 billion, five-year contract to manage translation and interpretation services for the U.S. Army Intelligence and Security Command (INSCOM), based out of Fort Belvoir. The contract provided linguistic services to the U.S. Army as well as any other U.S. government agencies supporting the Iraq War.

This award of contract award was protested by the incumbent, L-3 Communications, and "was sustained by the General Accountability Office (GAO). The U.S. Army expedited a Request for Reconsideration with the GAO, and the U.S. Army INSCOM issued a revised Request for Proposal."

In December 2007, GLS was awarded the contract for a second time in December 2007. Protests were made by L-3 Communications, after which "the Army announced that it would take 'corrective action' including conducting a new evaluation of offerors' cost proposals and a re-evaluation of offerors' past performance, and make a new award decision. INSCOM completed this process and, on February 15, 2008, selected GLS for the award a third time."

In July 2011, GLS was selected as one of six providers to compete on multiple task orders released under the $9.7 billion Department of Defense Language Interpretation Translation Enterprise (DLITE) contract. This contract, awarded by the Department of the Army, provided translation and interpretation services for Force Projection Operations mission areas.

=== Leadership ===
James A. Marks was the company's first CEO until his resignation in April 2009. Marks was succeeded by John Houck as the General Manager until his departure in September 2010.

In September 2010, Dr. Charles (Chuck) Tolleson became the President and General Manager of GLS.

In August 2014, Tom Fish became General Manager. In January 2015, he was promoted to President & General Manager.

== Controversies ==
In August 2008, GLS was the subject of a hearing in front of the Commission on Wartime Contracting in Iraq and Afghanistan (CWC) regarding questionable costs and poor management of the contract. When auditors examined the performance of GLS, they "found about $5 million being spent on three-bedroom apartments and automobile for individual contractor employees. At the same time, the company was slow getting linguists into Iraq."

In 2013, linguists who were working for GLS in Kuwait through a Kuwaiti sponsorship company faced a dispute between GLS and the sponsorship company. As a result, nearly 100 American civilians working as Arabic linguists on camps Buehring and Arifjan, two major Army bases in the Middle East, were unable to leave either post because they were at risk of being detained by Kuwaiti police. As many as nine linguists were detained outside the gates, held in Kuwaiti cells and flown back to the U.S., according to linguists interviewed and their employer.
