= Oklahoma Air National Guard =

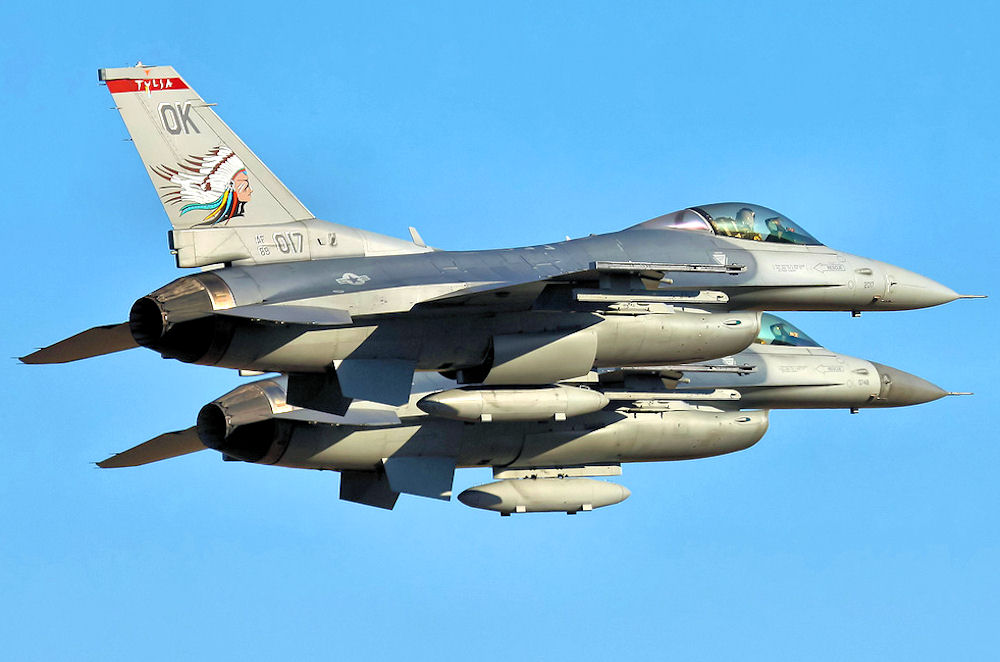
- F-16C Block 42E Fighting Falcons of the 125th Fighter Squadron at Tulsa AGB. The 125th is the oldest unit in the Oklahoma Air National Guard, having over 60 years of service to the state and nation.
- Active: 10 February 1941 - present
- Country: United States
- Allegiance: Oklahoma
- Branch: Air National Guard
- Type: State militia, military reserve force
- Role: "To meet state and federal mission responsibilities."
- Part of: Oklahoma Military Department; United States National Guard Bureau
- Garrison/HQ: Oklahoma Military Department, 3501 Northeast Military Circle, Oklahoma City, Oklahoma, 73111

Commanders
- Civilian leadership: President Donald Trump (Commander-in-Chief); Troy Meink (Secretary of the Air Force); Governor Kevin Stitt (Governor of the State of Oklahoma)
- State military leadership: Brigadier General Gregory L. Ferguson

Insignia
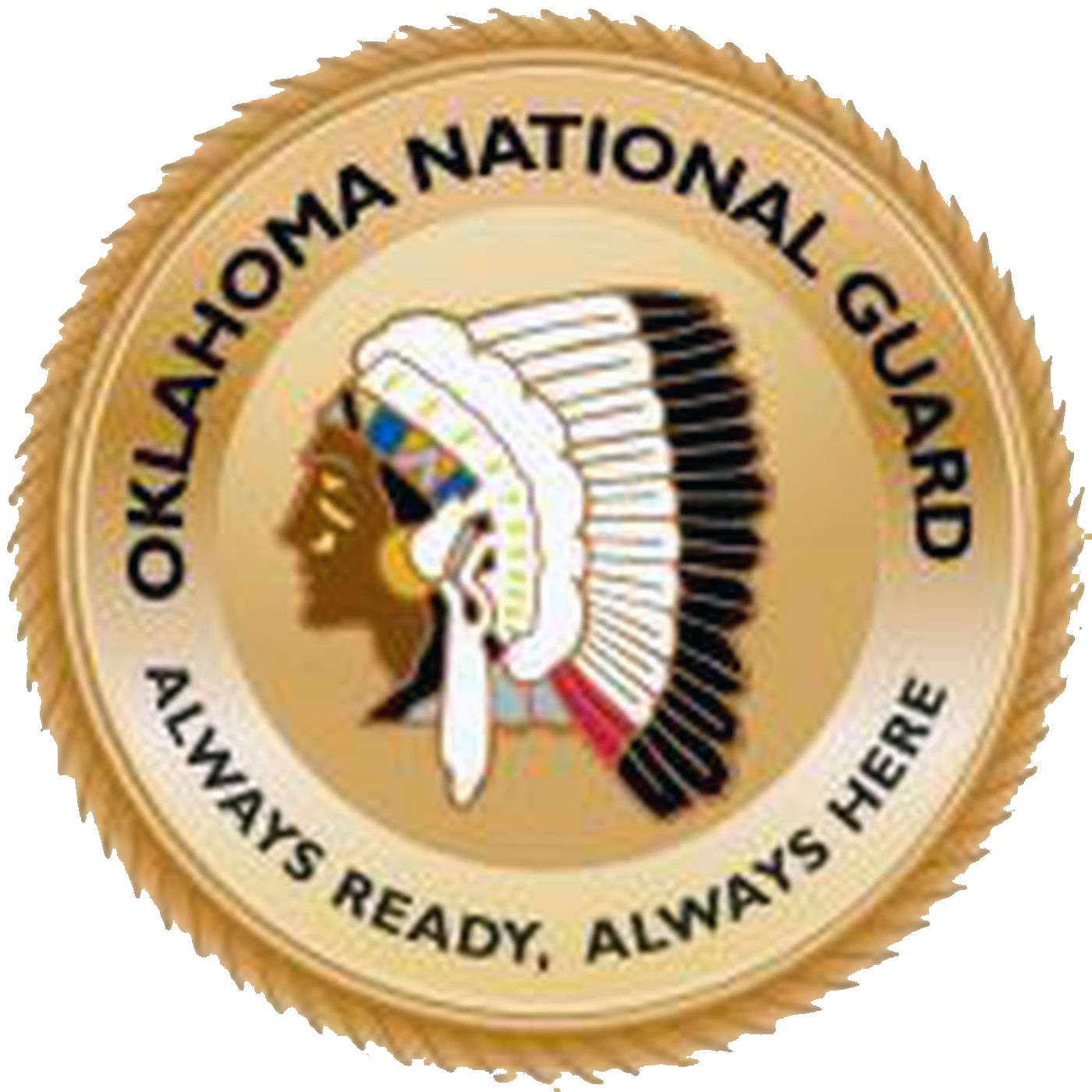
- Emblem of the Oklahoma Air National Guard

Aircraft flown
- Fighter: F-16C/D Fighting Falcon
- Reconnaissance: MC-12W Liberty

The Oklahoma Air National Guard (OK ANG) is the aerial militia of the State of Oklahoma, United States of America. It is a reserve of the United States Air Force and along with the Oklahoma Army National Guard an element of the Oklahoma National Guard of the larger United States National Guard Bureau.

As state militia units, the units in the Oklahoma Air National Guard are not in the normal United States Air Force chain of command. They are under the jurisdiction of the governor of Oklahoma through the office of the Oklahoma Adjutant General unless they are federalized by order of the president of the United States. The Oklahoma Air National Guard is headquartered in Oklahoma City, and its commander is currently Brigadier General Gregory L. Ferguson

== Overview ==
Under the "Total Force" concept, Oklahoma Air National Guard units are considered to be Air Reserve Components (ARC) of the United States Air Force (USAF). Oklahoma ANG units are trained and equipped by the Air Force and are operationally gained by a major command of the USAF if federalized. In addition, the Oklahoma Air National Guard forces are assigned to Air Expeditionary Forces and are subject to deployment tasking orders along with their active duty and Air Force Reserve counterparts in their assigned cycle deployment window.

Along with their federal reserve obligations, as state militia units the elements of the Oklahoma ANG are subject to being activated by order of the governor to provide protection of life and property, and preserve peace, order and public safety. State missions include disaster relief in times of earthquakes, hurricanes, floods and forest fires, search and rescue, protection of vital public services, and support to civil defense.

== Components ==
The Oklahoma Air National Guard consists of the following major units:

- 137th Special Operations Wing

Established 18 December 1947; operates: MC-12s
Stationed at: Will Rogers IAP, Oklahoma City
Gained by: Air Force Special Operations Command
The 137th Special Operations Wing's MC-12W mission is to provide light tactical crewed intelligence, surveillance, and reconnaissance to US Special Operations Command.

- 138th Fighter Wing

Established 15 February 1941 (as 125th Observation Squadron); operates: F-16C/D Fighting Falcons
Stationed at: Tulsa Air National Guard Base
Gained by: Air Combat Command
The 138th Fighter Wing maintains F-16 Fighting Falcon combat forces ready for mobilization, deployment, and employment as needed to support national security objectives.

Support Unit Functions and Capabilities:

- 125th Weather Flight
- 146th Air Support Operations Squadron (ASOS) "Plains Warriors" at Will Rogers Air National Guard Base
- 205th Engineering Installation Squadron at Will Rogers Air National Guard Base.

This squadron is responsible for the installation and upkeep of electronic equipment, such as: ground radar, ground communications, engineering communications infrastructure, avionic radar and towers, avionic communications and cryptography repair.

- 219th Electronics Engineering and Radar Installation Squadron.

== History ==
The 125th Observation Squadron was organized in December 1940 as the Oklahoma National Guard's first flying unit in Tulsa, Oklahoma. It was federally recognized in January 1941. For the next three and a half years the squadron was attached to the 77th Observation Group and the 76th Reconnaissance Group at various locales in the United States before arriving at Liverpool, United Kingdom on D-Day, 6 June 1944. After moving across the English Channel to France in August 1944, the 125th Liaison Squadron was attached to the U.S. Ninth Army until V-E Day, participating in the campaigns of northern France, Ardennes, Rhineland and Central Europe, and was awarded the Belgian Fourragère for gallantry during the Battle of the Bulge in July 1945. Over the course of those five years, the 125th flew the Douglas 0-38E, the Curtiss O-52 Owl, and the Stinson L-5 Sentinel.

On 24 May 1946, the United States Army Air Forces, in response to dramatic postwar military budget cuts imposed by President Harry S. Truman, allocated inactive unit designations to the National Guard Bureau for the formation of an Air Force National Guard. These unit designations were allotted and transferred to various State National Guard bureaus to provide them unit designations to re-establish them as Air National Guard units.

The 137th Wing traces its origins to the World War II 404th Fighter Group, which was allocated to the Oklahoma Air National Guard and re-designated as the 137th Fighter Group on 24 May 1946. The unit was founded on 21 November 1946 at Norman, Oklahoma as the 137th Fighter Group, and received its federal recognition on 18 December 1947.

The 125th Fighter Squadron returned to Tulsa in November 1945 and flew the F-51D Mustang until February 1947 when it was designated the 125th Fighter Bomber Squadron (Jet) and equipped with the F-84 Thunderjet. After receiving the Spaatz Trophy Award in 1950, the 125th was again ordered to active duty under the Ninth Air Force and sent to England AFB in Alexandria, Louisiana until July 1952. After returning to Tulsa under state control the squadron again flew the F-51 Mustang and the F-80 Shooting Star until becoming part of the 138th Fighter Group (AD) for duty with the Aerospace Defense Command flying the F-86D Sabre in August 1957.

January 1960 brought significant change to the 125th as the unit was designated the 125th Air Transport Squadron and assigned to the 137th Air Transport Wing in Oklahoma City. For the next eight years the unit flew the C-97 Stratofreighter, transporting cargo to Vietnam and throughout the world before converting to the C-124 Globemaster II in 1968.

The 137th Tactical Airlift Wing received the C-130 Hercules transport in 1972. In October 1972, the 125th was redesignated Tactical Fighter Squadron and converted to the T-33 Shooting Star in preparation for equipping with the F-100D Super Sabre in March 1973. The 125th converted to the A-7D Corsair II in July 1978.

In 1999 two F-16s from the 138th flying wing escorted a Learjet carrying Payne Stewart for 90 minutes into South Dakota. The airplane had lost cabin pressure and its windows were iced over. They coordinated with an E-3 AWACs out of Tinker AFB.

After conversion to the F-16 Fighting Falcon, the 138th Fighter Wing has participated in Operation Provide Comfort, Operation Northern Watch, and Operation Iraqi Freedom. The unit's deployment to Iraq in 2008 marked their 10th deployment to the Middle East. Additionally, the laser targeting pod system for precision guided munitions employment has been incorporated into the unit mission.

The 2005 Base Realignment and Closure Commission brought an expansion to the 138th Fighter Wing's mission. The wing acquired three F-16 Block 42 aircraft from the 57th Wing located at Nellis Air Force Base as well as six F-16 Block 42 aircraft from 132d Fighter Wing, Iowa Air National Guard. The 138th FW is also the host unit for the Defense Air Sovereignty Alert mission located at Ellington Field in Houston, Texas. BRAC also recommended the realignment of the 137th Airlift Wing, which lost its C-130 transport aircraft in 2008. Since then, as the 137th Air Refueling Wing, it shares the aircraft with the 507th Air Refueling Wing, Air Force Reserve Command, at Tinker AFB.

On 14 March 2008 a 138th Fighter Wing-assigned fighter aircraft en route to the Smoky Hill Air National Guard Range in Salina, Kansas accidentally dropped a 22-pound, non-explosive practice bomb on an apartment complex in Tulsa, damaging a building foundation and knocking out the power to the building. No one was injured and the 138th Fighter Wing announced that they were investigating the incident themselves.

In 2014 the Air Force Magazine annual almanac issue said that thirteen MC-12 Liberty electronic surveillance aircraft would be assigned to the Air National Guard, creating a new AFSOC-aligned surveillance unit at Will Rogers World Airport in Oklahoma.

In 2021, the Oklahoma National Guard helped to distribute food and water after Hurricane Ida.

On Wednesday, March 23, 2022, one F-16 crashed in Louisiana in a joint training exercise. The pilot ejected and was unharmed.

== See also ==
- Oklahoma State Guard
- Oklahoma Wing Civil Air Patrol
