= McLane Advanced Technologies =

McLane Advanced Technologies, LLC
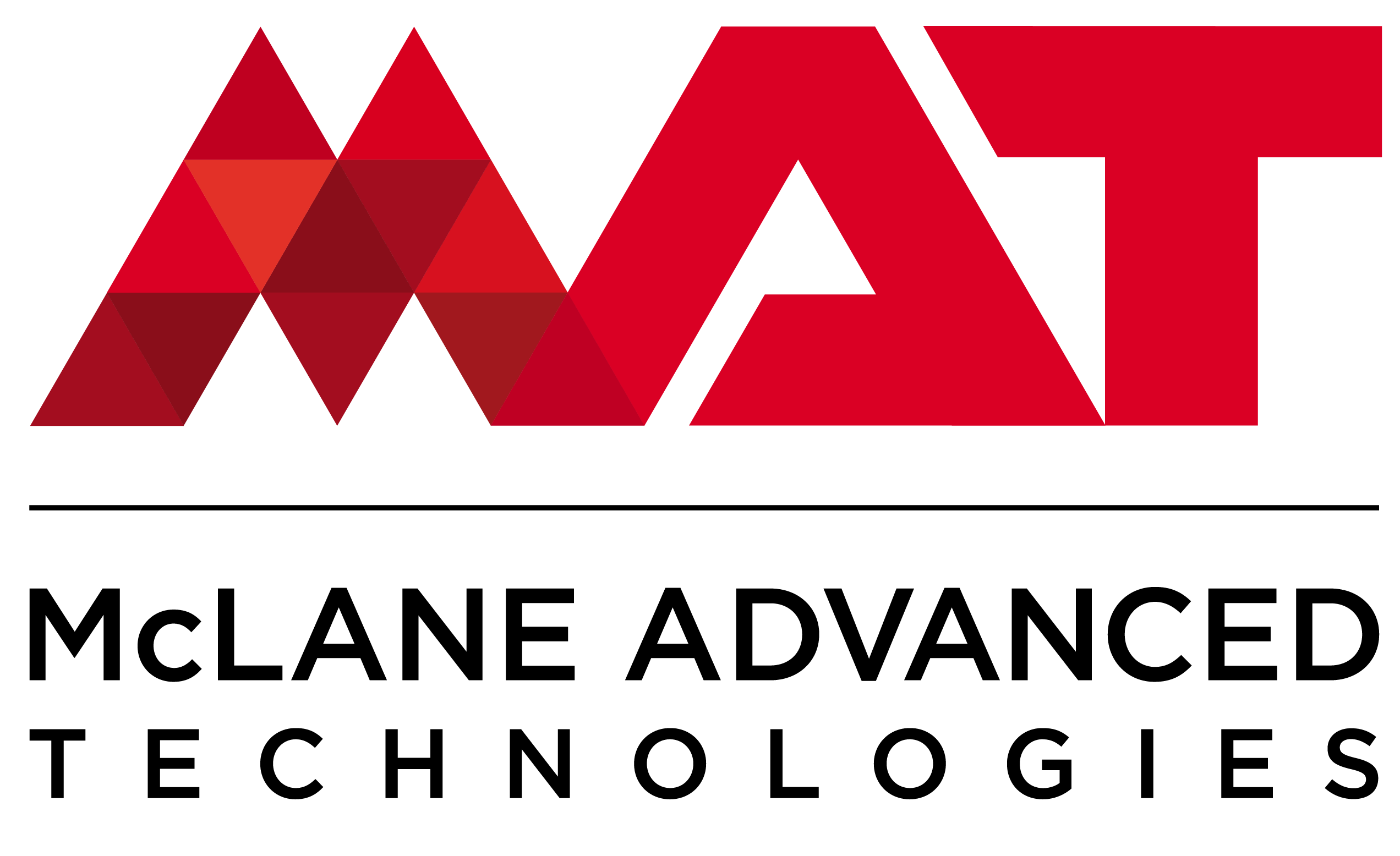
- Type: Private
- Industry: Information technology
- Founded: 2004
- Headquarters: 8484 Westpark Drive, Suite 900, McLean, VA 22102
- Key people: Drayton McLane Jr., Founder Peter Markakos, President
- Website: http://mclaneat.com/

McLane Advanced Technologies, LLC (MAT) is a technology company in the government, defence, and commercial industries. The company is based in Washington, D.C., and has offices in Austin and the D.C. area.

== History ==
McLane Advanced Technologies was established in 2004 by Drayton McLane, Jr. after discovering the Army's need for an updated logistics software system. MAT was awarded a contract to provide logistics information technology to the United States Army. The program, known as the Standard Army Maintenance System - Enhanced, involved the development, testing, and fielding of the logistics and maintenance system to the entire United States Army. MAT was awarded the contract for the sustainment work of the SAMS-E program in 2011.

== Awards ==
The company was named a Rising Star Company in Deloitte & Touche's Technology Fast 50 Program for Texas in 2007. The Rising Star award is a special designation that recognizes the two fastest-growing technology, media, telecommunications and life sciences companies based on revenue growth over three years and is part of the Deloitte Texas Technology Fast 50 program, which ranks the 50 fastest growing technology, media, telecommunications, and life sciences companies headquartered in Texas. Additionally, MAT was #13 on the Deloitte & Touche's Fast 500. MAT was also named to the 2009 Deloitte Technology Fast 500, as well as the Inc. 500 list of fastest-growing private companies.

McLane Advanced Technologies was named to the 2010 Inc. 5000 list and the 2010 Texas A&M University Aggie 100 list.

McLane Advanced Technologies received the Temple Chamber of Commerce Employer of the Year, presented by the Military Affairs Committee, honoring employers who demonstrate active employee recruitment of military veterans, National Guardsmen, and Reservists, 2005.
