= List of United States Air Force airborne air control squadrons =

A United States Air Force airborne air control squadron is an airborne unit which provides combat air control services in the form of radar, surveillance identification, weapons control, Battle Management and theater communications data link to the forces or area it is assigned to. This list contains squadrons inactive, active, and historical.

== List ==
Squadron	Shield	Location	Nickname	Command	Status
960th Airborne Air Control Squadron		Tinker AFB	"Viking Warriors"	Air Combat Command	Active
961st Airborne Air Control Squadron		Kadena AB	"Eyes of the Pacific"	Pacific Air Forces	Active
962d Airborne Air Control Squadron		Elmendorf AFB	"Eyes of the Eagle"	Pacific Air Forces	Active
963d Airborne Air Control Squadron		Tinker AFB	"Blue Knights"	Air Combat Command	Active
964th Airborne Air Control Squadron		Tinker AFB	"Phoenix"	Air Combat Command	Active
965th Airborne Air Control Squadron		Tinker AFB	"Falcons"	Air Combat Command	Active
966th Airborne Air Control Squadron		Tinker AFB	"Eagles"	Air Combat Command	Active
968th Expeditionary Airborne Air Control Squadron		Al Dhafra Air Base, United Arab Emirates	"Panthers"	Air Combat Command	Active
970th Airborne Air Control Squadron		Tinker AFB	"Thumper"	Reserve	Active

== See also ==
- List of United States Air Force squadrons
