= 964th Airborne Air Control Squadron =

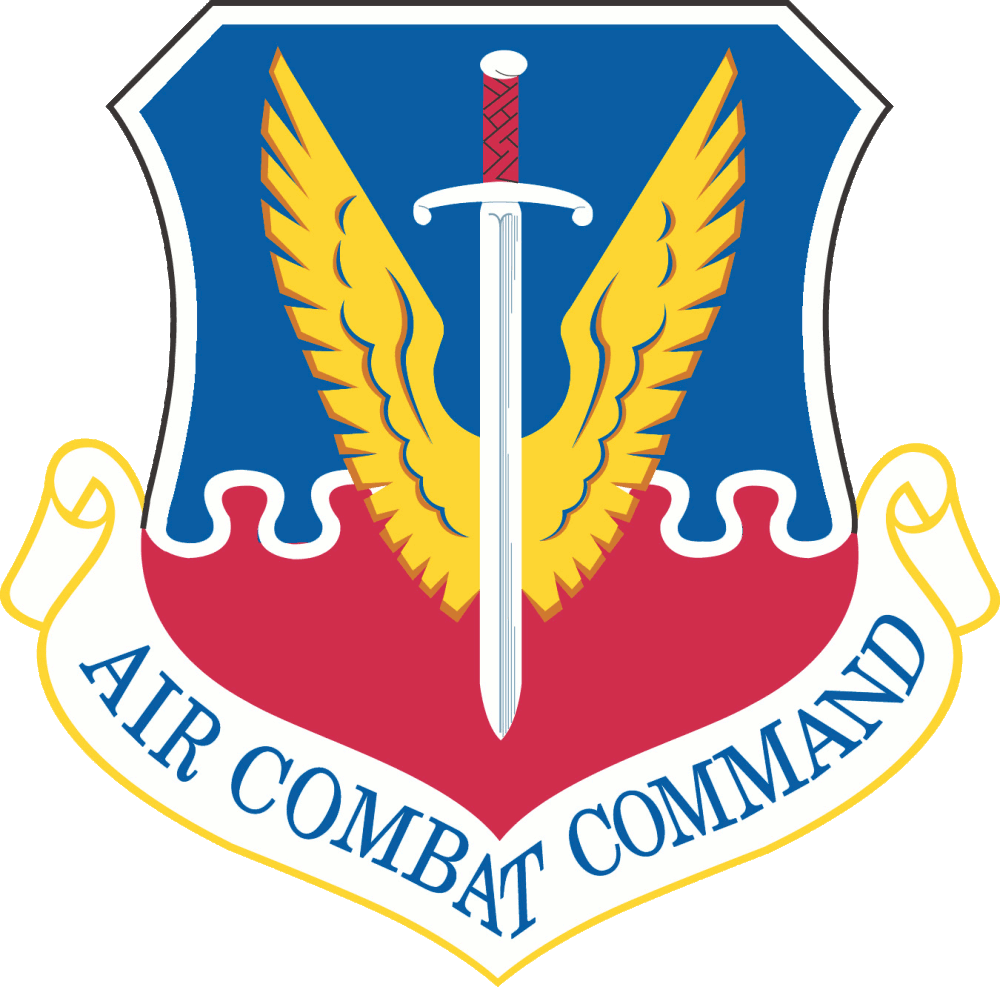
964th Airborne Air Control Squadron

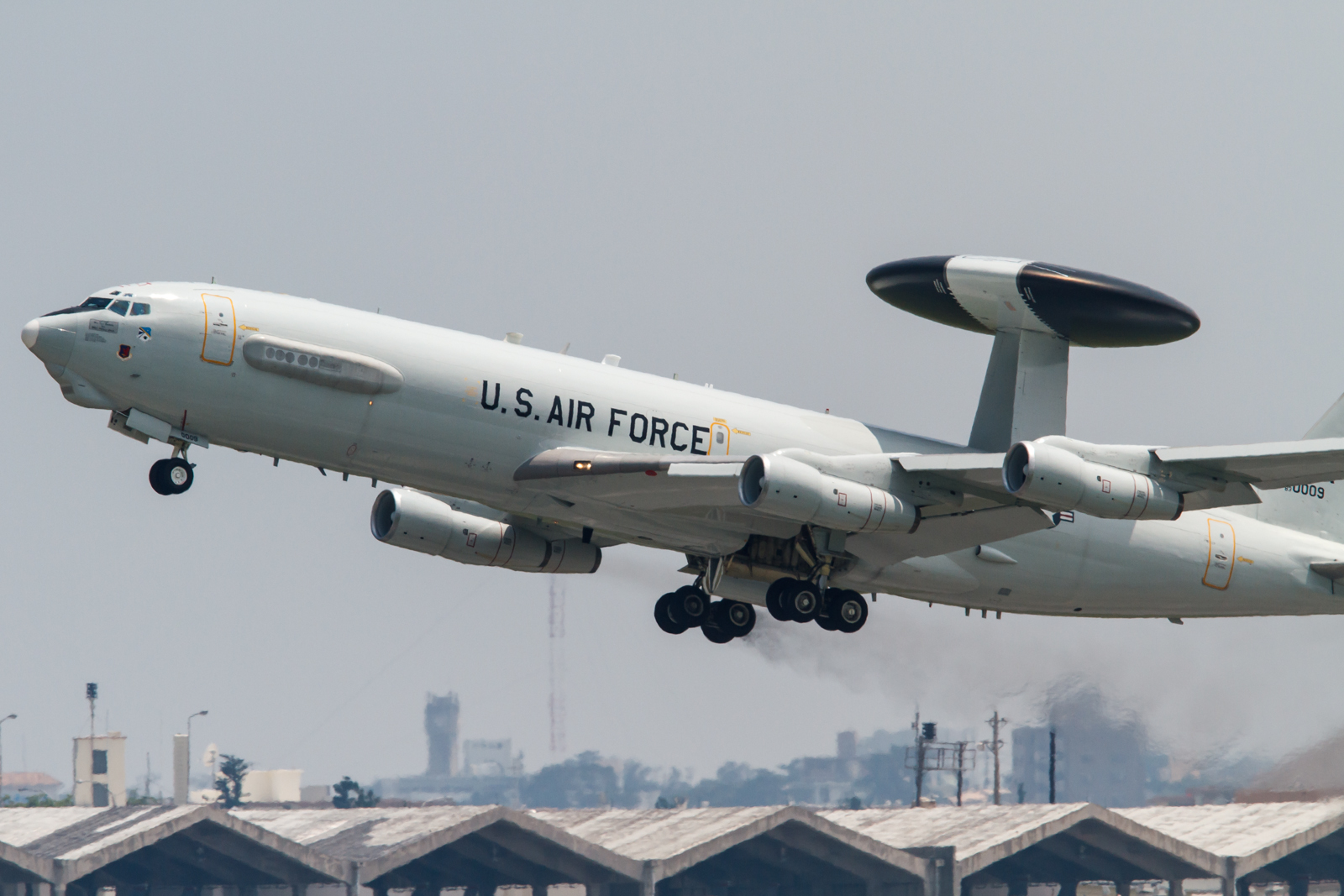
- 552nd Air Control Wing Boeing E-3 Sentry
- Active: 1942-1944; 1944–1945; 1955–1974; 1977-present
- Country: United States
- Branch: United States Air Force
- Role: Airborne command and control
- Part of: Air Combat Command
- Garrison/HQ: Tinker Air Force Base
- Motto: Pax in Vigilantia (Latin for 'Peace Through Vigilance')
- Engagements: Antisubmarine Campaign; China-Burma-India Theater; Gulf War; Iraq War
- Decorations: Air Force Meritorious Unit Award; Air Force Outstanding Unit Award with Combat "V" Device; Air Force Outstanding Unit Award; Republic of Vietnam Gallantry Cross with Palm

Insignia
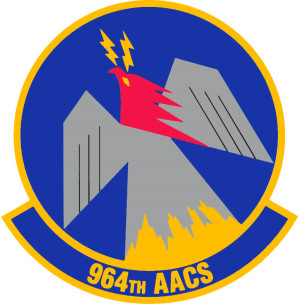
- 964th Airborne Air Control Squadron emblem (Note: Approved 1978. Description: On a Blue disc edged with a narrow Yellow border a stylized Phoenix ascending, head and neck Red, body and wings Gray garnished Black, eyed Yellow emitting two Yellow lightning bolts upward and a Yellow trail to the bottom of the disc.)

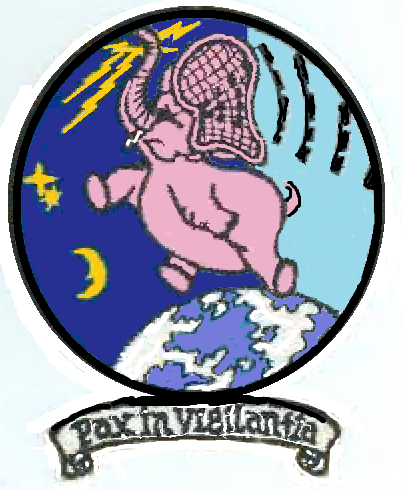
- 964th Airborne Early Warning and Control Squadron emblem (Note: Approved 23 August 1957.)

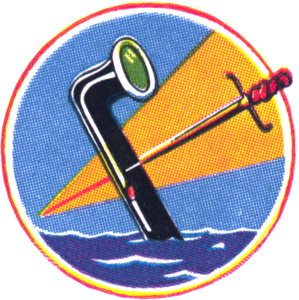
- 18th Antisubmarine Squadron emblem (Note: Approved 10 April 1943. Description: On a light blue disc, within a border red, piped white, a pile gold, point to dexter base, surmounted by a black submarine periscope, issuing from the waves of the sea proper in base, and pierced by a silver sword, hilt red, in the direction of the pile.)

The 964th Airborne Air Control Squadron is an active Air Force unit assigned to the 552nd Operations Group at Tinker Air Force Base, Oklahoma. It operates the Boeing E-3 Sentry aircraft conducting airborne command and control missions.

The squadron's first predecessor was established in 1942 as the 362nd Bombardment Squadron. It participated in antisubmarine warfare and was the sole training unit for Army Air Forces Antisubmarine Command as the 18th Antisubmarine Squadron. After the Navy assumed the antisubmarine mission, it trained aircrews on radar bombing systems as the 4th Search Attack Squadron until disbanding in a general reorganization of Army Air Forces training units in April 1944.

Its second forebear was organized in India as the 164th Liaison Squadron, part of the 1st Air Commando Group. It provided light transport and aeromedical evacuation in India and China, inactivating at the end of World War II.

The 964th Airborne Early Warning and Control Squadron was organized in 1944 to provide a seaward extension of the air defense system of the United States. It continued in this role until 1974. It was activated three years later in its current role as the 964th Airborne Warning and Control Squadron. In 1985, the three squadrons were consolidated into a single unit.

== Mission ==
The squadron provides worldwide response with the E-3 airborne warning and control aircraft. It provides combat commands with airborne systems and personnel for surveillance, warning and control of strategic, tactical, and special mission forces.

== History ==
=== Antisubmarine warfare ===
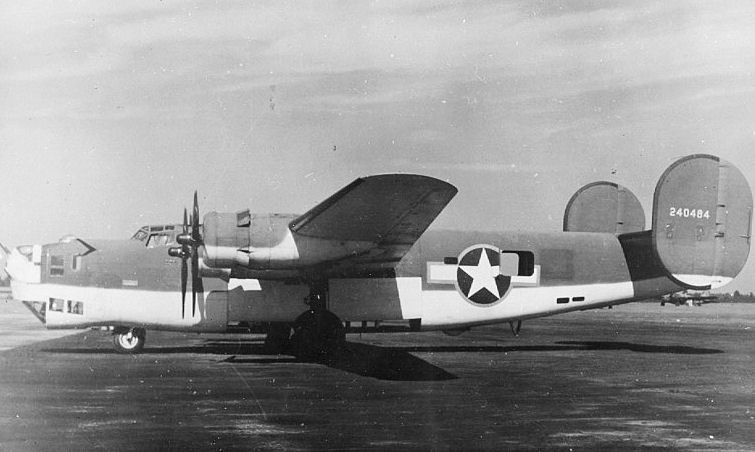
B-24 equipped for antisubmarine warfare (Note: Aircraft is Consolidated B-24D-65-CO Liberator, serial 42-40483. This plane was salvaged on 10 October 1945. Baugher, Joe (28 December 2022). "1942 USAF Serial Numbers". Joe Baugher. The retracted antenna for the SCR-517 radar is visible just aft of the open bomb bay doors in the place where the ventral gun turret would normally be installed.)

The first predecessor of the squadron was organized as the 362nd Bombardment Squadron at Salt Lake City Army Air Base, Utah in July 1942. It was one of the original squadrons of the 304th Bombardment Group. The squadron was only nominally manned until September, when it moved with the 304th Group to Geiger Field, Washington. The squadron moved to Ephrata Army Air Field, Washington, in October and equipped with a variety of light, medium, and heavy bombers.

Later that month, the 304th Group moved to Langley Field, Virginia, where it became part of AAF Antisubmarine Command (AAFAC). In December AAFAC replaced its groups with two wings, aligned with the Navy Sea Frontiers they supported, and the squadron became part of the 25th Antisubmarine Wing. From November, as the 18th Antisubmarine Squadron, the squadron became an Operational Training Unit (OTU) for antisubmarine warfare units, not only for the 25th Wing, but for the entire command. The squadron not only trained new crews, but also existing crews of antisubmarine squadrons to increase their proficiency and keep up with developing antisubmarine methods and new equipment. This included transition training in the Consolidated B-24 Liberator, which was becoming the command's primary operational aircraft, and the one equipping the squadron.

By late summer 1943, the Navy had taken over the antisubmarine mission and the 25th Wing became nonoperational, while the squadron came under the control of the 1st Sea-Search Attack Unit. In November 1943, The squadron was redesignated the 4th Search Attack Squadron and standardized on the Boeing B-17 Flying Fortress. It became a Replacement Training Unit for radar guided search and attack missions. However, the Army Air Forces was finding that standard military units like the 4th Squadron, whose manning was based on relatively inflexible tables of organization were not well adapted to the training mission, even more so to the replacement mission. Accordingly, the Army Air Forces adopted a more functional system in which each base was organized into a separate numbered unit. The squadron was disbanded in April 1944, and replaced by the 111th AAF Base Unit (Search Attack and Staging).

=== Liaison operations in the China-Burma-India Theater ===
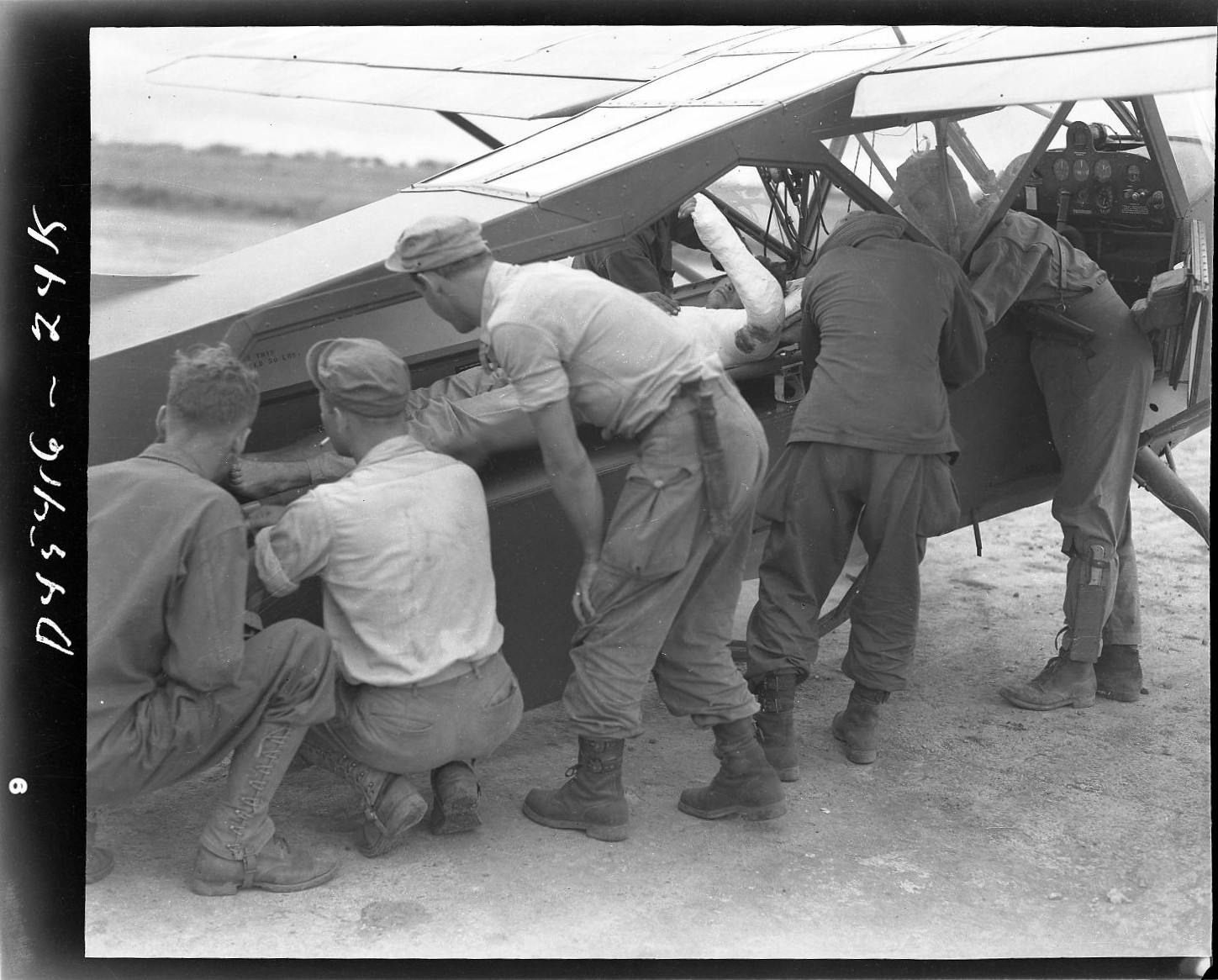
L-5B preparing for an air evacuation mission

The second predecessor of the squadron was organized as the 164th Liaison Squadron at Asansol Airfield, India in September 1944, when the 1st Air Commando Group was reorganized to form squadrons from the sections of the group. it was equipped with Stinson L-5 Sentinel and Noorduyn C-64 Norseman aircraft. Most of the squadron's pilots were enlisted. The squadron performed the supply, insertion, and medical evacuation missions critical to the success of the Air Commandos and the long range patrols they were created to support. The squadron deployed for short periods to airfields in Burma. It conducted visual reconnaissance, aeromedical evacuation, and light transport services for ground forces in Burma from 19 December 1944 until 3 May 1945. Although the squadron's L-5s were rated to operate out of airfields as short as 1,000 feet (300 m) to 1,500 feet (460 m), when evacuating wounded, they frequently operated from strips as short as 500 feet (150 m). From these short strips, they transported casualties to larger fields, where they could be transferred to larger Douglas C-47 Skytrains and Curtiss C-46 Commandos. The squadron's Sentinels were equipped with modified underwing bomb racks, which were used for mounting parachute packs to drop supplies when not even small landing areas were available. When flying reconnaissance missions, the 1st Air Commando Group's L-5s would use smoke to mark targets they had discovered so the group's fighters could immediately strike them.

Following V-J Day, the squadron remained in India until October 1945, when it returned to the United States. It was inactivated at the Port of Embarkation upon its arrival in November.

=== Airborne early warning and control ===
In designing the post-World War II air defense system, planners knew that the earlier the warning of approaching hostile bombers, the liklier it would be to intercept them. Because half of the vitally important potential targets were located within 150 miles (240 km) of the American coastline, the radar net needed to be extended seaward. Moreover, ideally the bombers could be engaged and destroyed before reaching American shores. Ultimately, the Air Force decided to establish a wing on each coast to perform offshore patrols.

The 964th Airborne Early Warning and Control Squadron was activated in March 1955 at McClellan Air Force Base, California, along with the 963d Airborne Early Warning and Control Squadron as the temporary 4712th Airborne Early Warning and Control Squadron was discontinued. As the warning and control mission at McClellan expanded, the 964th was assigned to the 552d Airborne Early Warning and Control Wing, which replaced a provisional wing in July.

Typical patrol missions were 11 to 13 hours long with 8 hours on station. They extended radar coverage 250 miles (400 km) out to sea. While on patrol, squadron aircraft were under the operational control of the ADC headquarters responsible for the area in which they operated, rather than the 552nd Wing. Late in 1958, the squadron also assumed the mission of performing gap-filler duty for temporarily inoperative ground radar stations. It tracked ballistic missiles in the Pacific after 1957 and supported space flight projects.

==== Cuban missile crisis ====
Prior to the detection of Soviet missiles in Cuba, Air Defense Command (ADC) maintained one EC-121 in orbit between Cuba and Florida. On 17 October 1962, ADC deployed six additional EC-121s, including aircraft and crews from the squadron, to McCoy Air Force Base, Florida to augment the planes stationed there. This enabled the establishment of a second orbit station to detect aircraft from Cuba on 20 October and a third on 24 October. Although the quarantine of Cuba was lifted on 17 November, the augmented airborne warning force remained at McCoy and maintained DEFCON 3 until 3 December, when the additional aircraft and crews deployed to Florida returned to McClellan.

==== Big Eye/College Eye Task Force ====
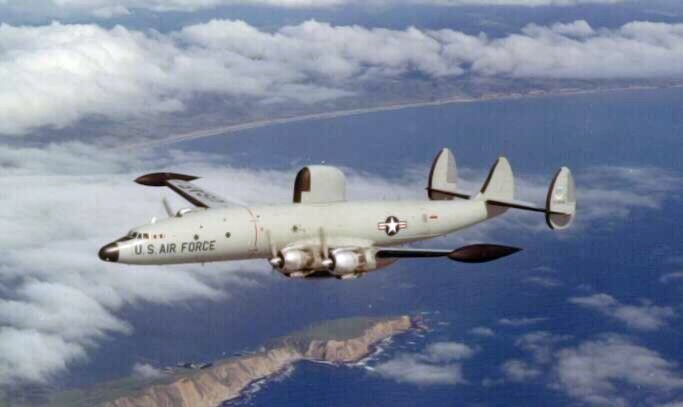
EC-121D deployed to Thailand

From April 1965, the squadron regularly deployed aircrew and aircraft to Thailand to support the Big Eye (later College Eye)Task Force. This deployment supported strike aircraft involved in Operation Rolling Thunder and Operation Barrel Roll in North Vietnam and Laos by warning them of the presence and location of enemy fighters and to warn them of possible encroachment of the Chinese border. Initially flights were flown in one of two stations over the Gulf of Tonkin. In October 1966, a station over Laos was added. The overwater flights were flown at very low altitudes (50 feet (15 m) to 300 feet (91 m) above the water. Starting in 1968, deployed aircraft also controlled strike aircraft in Laos. Individual deployments to the task force typically lasted four and a half months and continued through May 1974.

==== Draw down and inactivation ====
As early as 1966, it became apparent that the Johnson Administration did not regard the threat of attack by manned bombers as an area justifying large expenditures. Ground radars in the south and midwest were shut down beginning in 1968 In addition, an improved warning system based on the Boeing 707 was planned to replace the squadron's EC-121s. In 1972, over one quarter of ADC's EC-121 force was mothballed. As this drawdown continued, the squadron was inactivated on 1 July 1974.

=== Airborne air control ===
As the updated warning system was implemented, the squadron was designated the 964th Airborne Warning and Control Squadron and activated with Boeing E-3 Sentrys on 1 July 1977 at Tinker Air Force Base, Oklahoma. The squadron provided airborne early warning, surveillance, command, control and communications, and battlefield services for US Armed Forces and allies. The squadron fulfilled this mission not only from its home base, but from geographical locations, worldwide. It participated in numerous military exercises, such as airborne battlefield command and control for tactical control centers, search and rescue, and maritime operations from October 1977. Starting in January 1979, it assisted United States Customs in drug interdiction. Its aircraft provided low-altitude radar coverage over large areas, observing drug traffic routes to reduce smuggling of narcotics into the United States.

During the Iran-Iraq War of 1980 to 1989 it deployed its E-3s to Saudi Arabia to perform intelligence gathering missions. It flew Airborne Battlefield Command, Control and Communications (ABCCC) missions on airborne alert during Operation Urgent Fury, the 1983 replacement the of revolutionary government of Grenada and Operation Just Cause, the incursion into Panama in December 1989.

The squadron deployed to perform airborne warning and control operations in Southwest Asia for Operations Desert Shield and Desert Storm, from August 1990 to March 1991. In January 1993, it returned to Southwest Asia to support deployed aircraft and crews to ensure that Iraq complied with the ceasefire terms. It also supported Operation Provide Comfort, airlift of humanitarian relief to Kurds fleeing Saddam Hussein, and Operations Northern and Southern Watch, the no fly zones in Iraq. It deployed again in 2003 for Operation Iraqi Freedom.

Elsewhere, it supported Operation Allied Force, the NATO operation against Serbia in Kosovo in 1999. Since October 2002, it has supported Operation Enduring Freedom, the Global War on Terrorism. It also flew missions in support of disaster relief efforts after Hurricanes Katrina and Rita devastated the US Gulf Coast in September 2005.

== Lineage ==
4th Search Attack Squadron

- Constituted as the 362d Bombardment Squadron (Heavy) on 28 January 1942

Activated on 15 July 1942
Redesignated 18th Antisubmarine Squadron (Heavy) on 29 November 1942
Redesignated 4th Sea Search Attack Squadron (Heavy) on 23 October 1943
Redesignated 4th Search Attack Squadron (Heavy) on 22 November 1943
Disbanded on 10 April 1944
Reconstituted on 19 September 1985 and consolidated with the 164th Liaison Squadron and the 964th Airborne Warning and Control Squadron as the 964th Airborne Warning and Control Squadron

164th Liaison Squadron

Constituted as the 164th Liaison Squadron (Commando) on 9 August 1944
Activated on 3 September 1944
Inactivated on 3 November 1945
Consolidated with the 4th Search Attack Squadron and the 964th Airborne Warning and Control Squadron as the 964th Airborne Warning and Control Squadron on 19 September 1985

964th Airborne Air Control Squadron

Constituted as the 964th Airborne Early Warning and Control Squadron on 8 December 1954
Activated on 8 March 1955
Inactivated on 30 June 1974
Redesignated 964th Airborne Warning and Control Squadron on 7 February 1977
Activated on 1 July 1977
Consolidated with the 4th Search Attack Squadron and the 164th Liaison Squadron on 19 September 1985
Redesignated 964th Airborne Air Control Squadron on 1 July 1994

=== Assignments ===
- 304th Bombardment Group, 15 July 1942
- 25th Antisubmarine Wing, 30 December 1942
- I Bomber Command, (Note: AAF Antisubmarine Command was redesignated I Bomber Command the day the squadron was assigned to it.) 24 August 1943 (attached to 1st Sea-Search Attack Unit after 30 September 1943)
- 1st Sea-Search Attack Unit (later 1st Search Attack Group), 23 October 1943 – 10 April 1944
- 1st Air Commando Group, 3 September 1944 – 3 November 1945
- 8th Air Division, 8 March 1955 (attached to the Airborne Early Warning and Control Wing, Provisional)
- 552nd Airborne Early Warning and Control Wing, 8 July 1955 – 30 June 1974
- 552nd Airborne Warning and Control Wing (later, 552nd Airborne Warning and Control Division; 552nd Airborne Warning and Control Wing, 552nd Air Control Wing), 1 July 1977
- 552nd Operations Group, 29 May 1992 – present

=== Stations ===
- Salt Lake City Army Air Base, Utah, 15 July 1942
- Geiger Field, Washington, 15 September 1942
- Ephrata Army Air Base, Washington, 1 October 1942
- Langley Field, Virginia, 29 October 1942 – 10 April 1944
- Asansol Airfield, India, 3 September 1944
- Inbaung Airfield, Burma, 19 December 1944
- Kan Airfield, Burma, 15 January 1945
- Asansol Airfield, India, 31 January 1945
- Shwebo Airfield, Burma, 20 February 1945
- Ondaw Airfield, Burma, 12 March 1945
- Asansol Airfield, India, 31 March 1945
- Sinthe Airfield, Burma, 20 April 1945
- Magwe Airfield, Burma, 4 May 1945
- Asansol Airfield, India, 10 May – 6 October 1945
- Camp Kilmer, New Jersey, 1–3 November 1945
- McClellan Air Force Base, California, 8 March 1955 – 30 June 1974
- Tinker Air Force Base, Oklahoma, 1 July 1977 – present

=== Aircraft ===
- Douglas B-18 Bolo (1942–1943)
- Douglas A-20 Havoc (1942–1943)
- Consolidated B-24 Liberator (1942–1943)
- Lockheed B-34 Lexington (1942–1943)
- Boeing B-17 Flying Fortress (1942–1944)
- Stinson L-5 Sentinel (1944–1945)
- Noorduyn C-64 Norseman (1944–1945)
- Lockheed RC-121 (later EC-121) Warning Star (1955–1974)
- Boeing E-3 Sentry (1977–present)

=== Awards and campaigns ===
| Award streamer | Award | Dates | Notes |
|---|---|---|---|
| | Air Force Meritorious Unit Award | 6 June 2011–31 October 2012 | 964th Airborne Air Control Squadron |
| | Air Force Meritorious Unit Award | 1 June 2020–31 May 2021 | 964th Airborne Air Control Squadron |
| | Air Force Outstanding Unit Award with Combat "V" Device | 1 July 1969–30 June 1970 | 964th Airborne Early Warning and Control Squadron |
| | Air Force Outstanding Unit Award with Combat "V" Device | 1 July 1971–31 December 1972 | 964th Airborne Early Warning and Control Squadron |
| | Air Force Outstanding Unit Award with Combat "V" Device | 1 June 2002–31 May 2003 | 964th Airborne Air Control Squadron |
| | Air Force Outstanding Unit Award | 1 July 1961–30 June 1963 | 964th Airborne Early Warning and Control Squadron |
| | Air Force Outstanding Unit Award | 15 April 1965–1 July 1966 | 964th Airborne Early Warning and Control Squadron |
| | Air Force Outstanding Unit Award | 2 July 1966–1 July 1968 | 964th Airborne Early Warning and Control Squadron |
| | Air Force Outstanding Unit Award | 1 July 1970–30 June 1971 | 964th Airborne Early Warning and Control Squadron |
| | Air Force Outstanding Unit Award | 1 July 1977–30 June 1978 | 964th Airborne Warning and Control Squadron |
| | Air Force Outstanding Unit Award | 1 July 1978–30 June 1980 | 964th Airborne Warning and Control Squadron |
| | Air Force Outstanding Unit Award | 1 July 1982–30 June 1984 | 964th Airborne Warning and Control Squadron |
| | Air Force Outstanding Unit Award | 1 May 1985–30 April 1987 | 964th Airborne Warning and Control Squadron |
| | Air Force Outstanding Unit Award | 1 May 1987–30 April 1989 | 964th Airborne Warning and Control Squadron |
| | Air Force Outstanding Unit Award | 1 December 1989–1 December 1991 | 964th Airborne Warning and Control Squadron |
| | Air Force Outstanding Unit Award | 1 June 2002–31 May 2003 | 964th Airborne Air Control Squadron |
| | Air Force Outstanding Unit Award | 1 June 2003–31 May 2004 | 964th Airborne Air Control Squadron |
| | Air Force Outstanding Unit Award | 1 June 2006–31 May 2007 | 964th Airborne Air Control Squadron |
| | Air Force Outstanding Unit Award | 1 June 2007–31 May 2008 | 964th Airborne Air Control Squadron |
| | Air Force Outstanding Unit Award | 1 June 2012–31 May 2013 | 964th Airborne Air Control Squadron |
| | Air Force Outstanding Unit Award | 1 June 2013–31 May 2014 | 964th Airborne Air Control Squadron |
| | Air Force Outstanding Unit Award | 1 June 2018–31 May 2020 | 964th Airborne Air Control Squadron |
| | Air Force Outstanding Unit Award | 1 June 2022–31 May 2023 | 964th Airborne Air Control Squadron |
| | Vietnamese Gallantry Cross with Palm | 1 April 1966–28 January 1973 here | 964th Airborne Early Warning and Control Squadron |

| Campaign Streamer | Campaign | Dates | Notes |
|---|---|---|---|
| | Antisubmarine | 29 October 1942–1 August 1943 | 362nd Bombardment Squadron (later 18th Antisubmarine Squadron) |
| | Central Burma | 29 January 1945–15 July 1945 | 164th Liaison Squadron |
| | Defense of Saudi Arabia | 2 August 1990–16 January 1991 | 964th Airborne Warning and Control Squadron |
| | Liberation and Defense of Kuwait | 17 January 1991–11 April 1991 | 964th Airborne Warning and Control Squadron |
| | Iraqi Surge | 10 January 2007–31 December 2008 | 964th Expeditionary Airborne Air Control Squadron (conferred) (Note: Expeditionary units are deemed separate units by the Air Force. When a regular unit is the major force provider for an expeditionary unit, the expeditionary unit takes its name from the major force provider, which is entitled to any honors earned by the expeditionary unit. AF Instruction 38-101, Manpower and Organization, 29 August 2019, para. 31.4.) |
| | Iraqi Sovereignty | 1 January 2009–31 August 2010 | 964th Expeditionary Airborne Air Control Squadron (conferred) |
| | Global War on Terror Expeditionary Medal | | 964th Expeditionary Airborne Air Control Squadron (conferred) |

== See also ==
- List of United States Air Force airborne air control squadrons
- B-17 Flying Fortress units of the United States Army Air Forces
- B-24 Liberator units of the United States Army Air Forces
