= John L. Piotrowski =

United States Air Force general

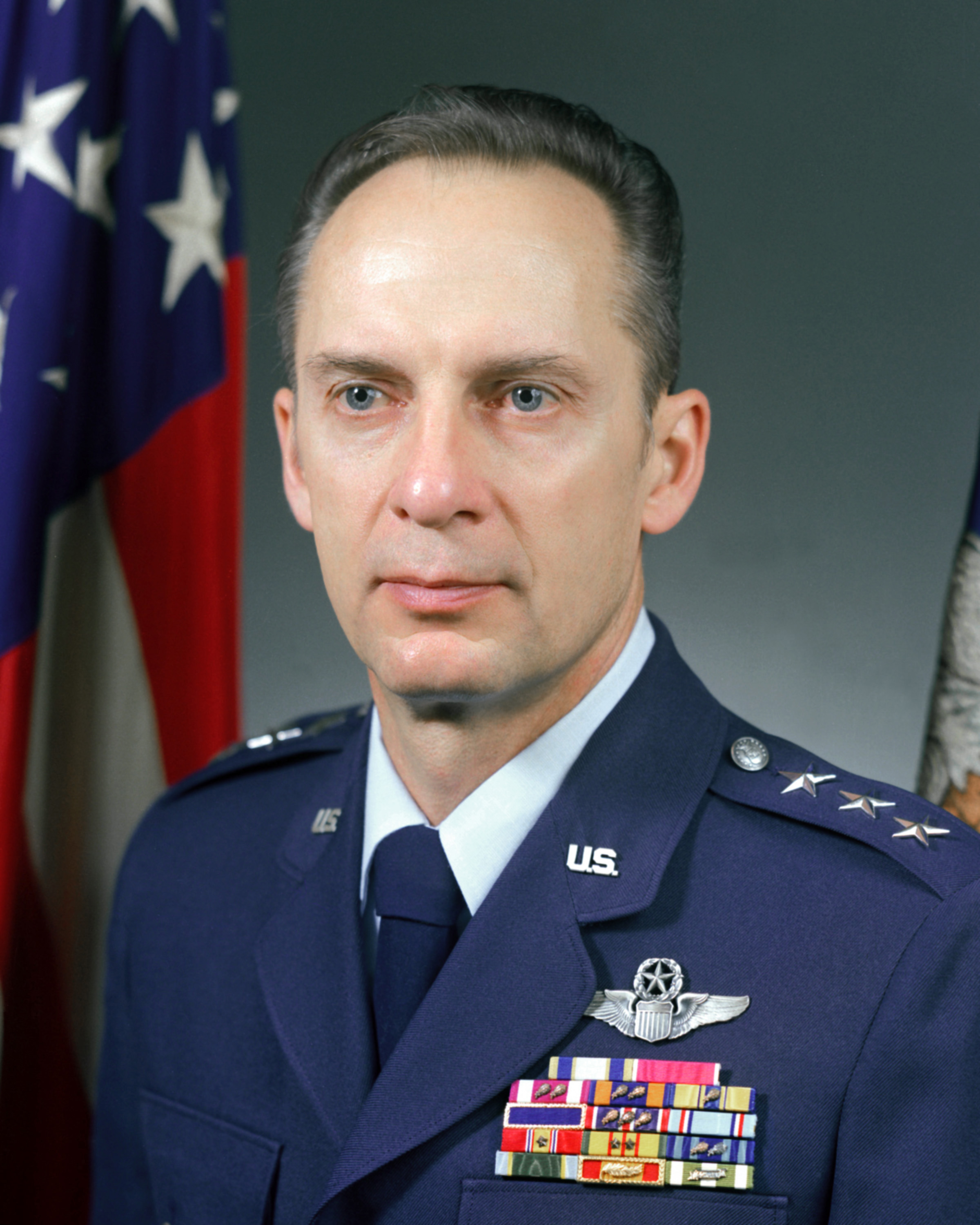
- Lieutenant General John L. Piotrowski
- Born: February 17, 1934 (age 92); Detroit, Michigan
- Military career
- Allegiance: United States of America
- Branch: United States Air Force
- Service years: 1952-1990
- Rank: General
- Nickname: Pete
- Commands: North American Aerospace Defense Command
- Conflicts: Vietnam War
- Awards: Legion of Merit; Air Medal (3)

General John Louis Piotrowski (born February 17, 1934) is a retired United States Air Force four-star general who served as Vice Chief of Staff, U.S. Air Force (VCSAF), from 1985 to 1987; and Commander in Chief, North American Aerospace Defense Command/Commander in Chief, U.S. Space Command (CINCNORAD/USCINCSPACE), from 1987 to 1990.

== Early life and education ==
Piotrowski was born in 1934, in Detroit and graduated from Henry Ford Trade School in Dearborn, Michigan, in 1951. He attended Arizona State University and Florida State University, and graduated from the University of Nebraska at Omaha in 1965 with a Bachelor of Science degree. He did postgraduate work at the University of Southern California and Auburn University, and attended the program for management development at Harvard University. He completed Squadron Officer School in 1956, Air Command and Staff College in 1965, Armed Forces Staff College in 1968 and the RAF College of Air Warfare, Royal Air Force Station Manby, England, in 1971.

== Military career ==
He enlisted in the U.S. Air Force in September 1952. After basic training at Lackland Air Force Base, Texas, he was assigned to Keesler Air Force Base, Mississippi, as a student in basic electronics and ground radar.

In July 1953 Piotrowski transferred to Harlingen Air Force Base, Texas, for navigator and observer training in the aviation cadet program. After graduating as a distinguished graduate, he was commissioned a second lieutenant in the Air Force in August 1954. He then returned to Keesler Air Force Base for advanced training in electronic countermeasures. In January 1955 he received the electronic warfare rating and was assigned to the 67th Tactical Reconnaissance Wing in South Korea and Japan as an electronic warfare officer and RB-26 navigator.

Piotrowski returned to the United States in May 1957 for pilot training at Marana Air Base, Arizona; Bainbridge Air Base, Georgia; and Bryan Air Force Base, Texas. He then attended F-86F advanced gunnery training at Williams Air Force Base, Arizona. After graduation he was assigned as armament and electronics maintenance officer at Williams and, later, at Luke Air Force Base, Arizona. In May 1961 he moved to Eglin Air Force Auxiliary Field 9, Florida, and joined the initial cadre of Project Jungle Jim, which became the 1st Air Commando Wing. While assigned to Eglin, he served in Southeast Asia, from November 1961 to May 1963, as a munitions maintenance officer, and T-28 and B-26 combat aircrew member.

In August 1965 Piotrowski joined the Air Force Fighter Weapons School at Nellis Air Force Base, Nevada, and served as an F-4C instructor pilot, chief of academics, an academic instructor and project officer for the Air Force operational test and evaluation of the Walleye missile program. Upon completion of testing in the United States, he introduced the Walleye into combat with the 8th Tactical Fighter Wing in Southeast Asia. After graduation from the Armed Forces Staff College in August 1968, he was assigned to Headquarters U.S. Air Force, Washington, D.C., as an action officer under the deputy director of plans for force development.

From December 1970 to July 1971 he attended the RAF College of Air Warfare. He was then assigned to Bitburg Air Base, West Germany, as assistant and, subsequently, deputy commander for operations, 36th Tactical Fighter Wing. In January 1972 he took command of the 40th Tactical Group, Aviano Air Base, Italy.

In April 1974 Piotrowski became chief of the Air Force Six-Man Group, located at Maxwell Air Force Base, directly responsible to the chief of staff. He became vice commander of Keesler Technical Training Center, Keesler Air Force Base, in March 1975.

He took command of the reactivated 552d Airborne Warning and Control Wing at Tinker Air Force Base, Oklahoma, in July 1976 and was instrumental in establishing the E-3A Sentry Airborne Warning and Control System aircraft as an operational Air Force weapon system. While Congress debated the E-3 future (due to huge cost over-runs), General Piotrowski took the planes on continuous road shows. Especially Europe, and Korea. He filled the planes with observers who would benefit, or could appreciate the capability to project tactical forces anywhere in the world, in less than 24 hours. He was not only an effective leader, he was very personable and warm hearted. Before Piotrowski, the E-3 was going to be a system that would orbit America in defense, and after he arrived he changed the system to deploy to where the war was, and bring tankers and fighters along. A true tactical mission, with troops who could live out of an A-3 bag for 200 days a year. Piotrowski was named deputy commander for air defense, Tactical Air Command, Peterson Air Force Base, in September 1979. In April 1981 he became Tactical Air Command's deputy chief of staff for operations at Langley Air Force Base, Virginia, and in August 1982 was assigned as the command's vice commander. He served as commander of 9th Air Force, Shaw Air Force Base, South Carolina, from October 1982 to July 1985, when he became vice chief of staff of the Air Force, Washington, D.C. He assumed command of NORAD in February 1987.

=== Awards and decorations ===
Piotrowski was a command pilot with more than 5,000 flying hours, including 100 combat missions and 210 combat flying hours. His military decorations and awards include the Defense Distinguished Service Medal, Air Force Distinguished Service Medal, Legion of Merit, Meritorious Service Medal with two oak leaf clusters, Air Medal with two oak leaf clusters, Air Force Commendation Medal with oak leaf cluster, Presidential Unit Citation and Air Force Outstanding Unit Award with three oak leaf clusters. He received the Eugene M. Zuckert Management Award for 1979. On May 13, 2017, General Piotrowski was inducted into the Michigan Aviation Hall of Fame at their facility located in Kalamazoo, Michigan.

- Defense Distinguished Service Medal
- Air Force Distinguished Service Medal
- Legion of Merit
- Meritorious Service Medal with two oak leaf clusters
- Air Medal
- Air Force Commendation Medal with oak leaf cluster
- Presidential Unit Citation
- Air Force Outstanding Unit Award with three oak leaf clusters
