= 552nd Air Control Wing =

552nd Air Control Wing

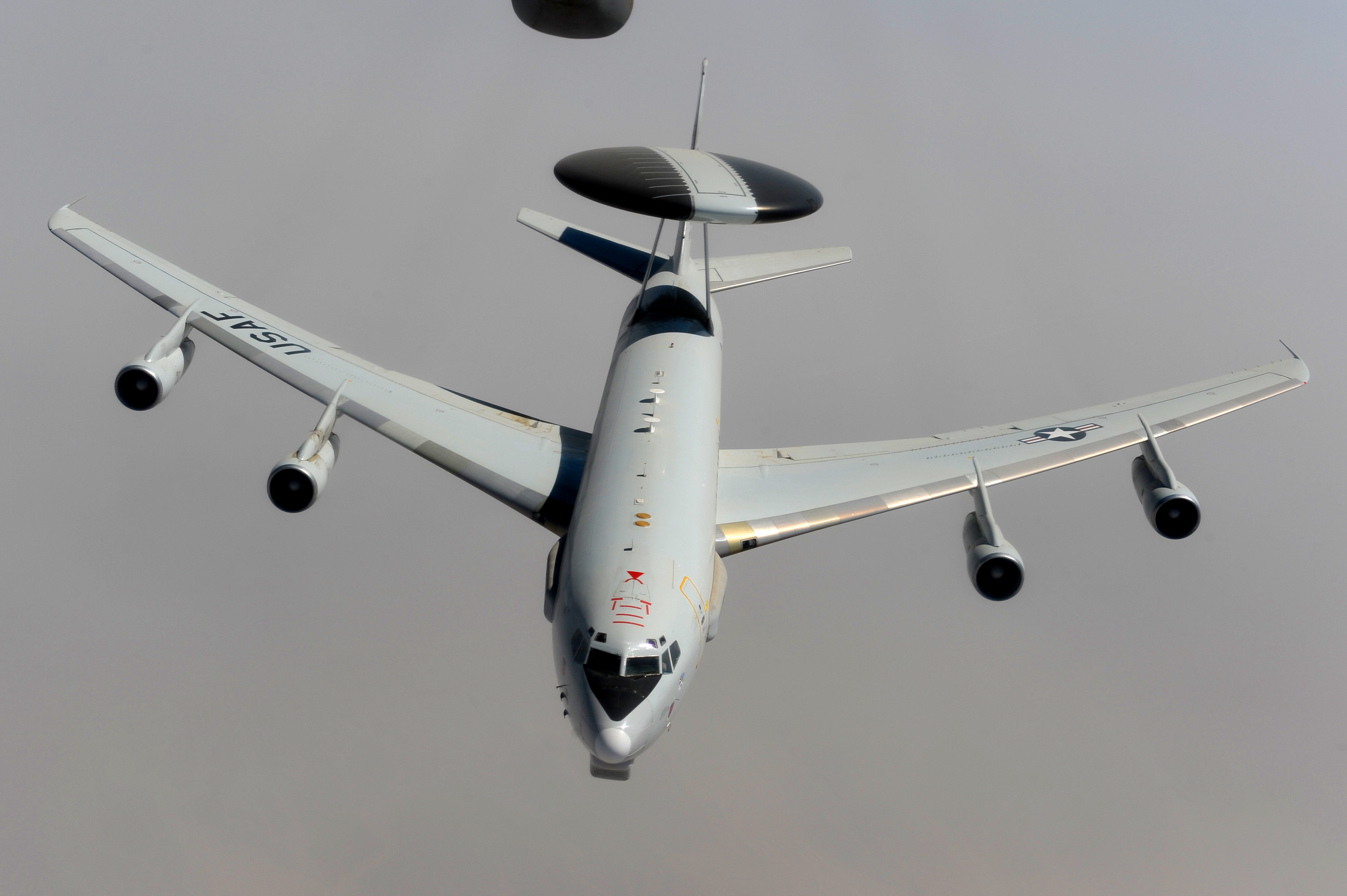
- E-3 Sentry refueling during Operation Enduring Freedom
- Active: 1955–1976; 1976–present
- Country: United States
- Branch: United States Air Force
- Role: Air Command and Control
- Part of: Air Combat Command
- Garrison/HQ: Tinker Air Force Base
- Motto: Robur Ex Vigilantia Latin In Vigilance is Strength
- Decorations: Air Force Outstanding Unit Award with Combat "V" Device; Air Force Outstanding Unit Award; Republic of Vietnam Gallantry Cross with Palm

Commanders
- Current commander: Colonel Kendrick L. Carroll
- Notable commanders: General John L. Piotrowski; General Lori J. Robinson

Insignia
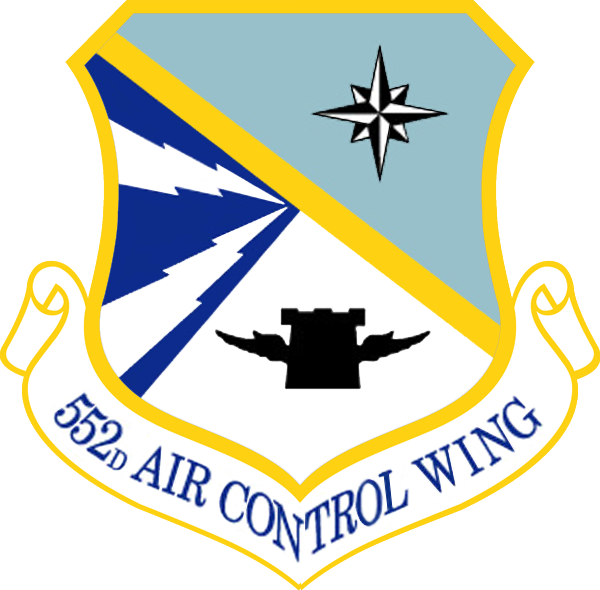
- 552d Air Control Wing emblem (approved 6 February 1956) (Note: Modified 27 October 1994 to remove the motto from the scroll. The eight-pointed star represents a mariner's compass and symbolizes the wing's surveillance capabilities. The light blue represents the skies where the wing operates. The Air Force yellow band stands for the Air Force, while the lightning bolts symbolize the electronic equipment that supports the wing's mission. The black-winged battlements depict the unit's mission: guard the nation's borders with air power.)

The 552d Air Control Wing is an operational wing of the United States Air Force. It has been based at Tinker Air Force Base, Oklahoma, since July 1976, operating the Boeing E-3 Sentry. It includes the 552d Operations Group, 552d Maintenance Group, 552d Training Group, and 552d Air Control Group.

The wing is responsible to the commander of Air Combat Command for the operation, maintenance, logistics, training, and combat support of E-3 Sentry Airborne Warning and Control System (AWACS) aircraft and Control and Reporting Centers (CRCs). The wing provides combat-ready theater battle management forces, mobile command control, and communications radar elements at the direction of the Chairman of the Joint Chiefs of Staff. It deploys, operates, and supports these forces worldwide ensuring combat capability for all peacetime and contingency operations.

From 1955 through 1976, it was located at McClellan Air Force Base, California, where it operated the Lockheed EC-121 Warning Star aircraft providing radar coverage off the Pacific coast of the United States.

== Units ==
- 552nd Operations Group

960th Airborne Air Control Squadron - E-3B/C/G Sentry
963rd Airborne Air Control Squadron - E-3G Sentry
964th Airborne Air Control Squadron - E-3G Sentry
965th Airborne Air Control Squadron - E-3G Sentry

- 552nd Maintenance Group

552nd Maintenance Operations Squadron
552nd Equipment Maintenance Squadron
552nd Component Maintenance Squadron
552nd Aircraft Maintenance Squadron

- 552nd Training Group

552nd Training Support Squadron
436th Training Squadron
966th Airborne Air Control Squadron - E-3G Sentry

- 552nd Air Control Group

552nd Air Control Networks Squadron
726th Air Control Squadron
729th Air Control Squadron
752d Operations Support Squadron

== History ==
=== Air Defense Command warning and control ===
The 552d Airborne Early Warning and Control Wing was activated on 8 July 1955 at McClellan Air Force Base, California, when it assumed command of the 963d and 964th Airborne Air Control Squadrons, which had been activated that March. The wing's third operational squadron, the 965th Airborne Early Warning and Control Squadron was activated the next month. The wing replaced the Airborne Early Warning and Control Wing, Provisional, which had been organized at McClellan on 1 January.

Initially, the wing was assigned to the 8th Air Division, which also controlled the 551st Airborne Early Warning and Control Wing at Otis Air Force Base, Massachusetts, which performed the same mission off the Atlantic seaboard. In July 1957, Air Defense Command (ADC) inactivated the 8th Division and the wing was assigned to Western Air Defense Force. In July 1963, the 966th Airborne Early Warning and Control Squadron at McCoy Air Force Base, Florida was transferred from the 551st Wing. The 966th's mission was to provide expanded coverage off the Florida coastline, which included possible intrusions into American airspace from Cuba. This assignment continued with a brief interruption until the 966th was inactivated in December 1969. At the end of 1969, with the inactivation of the 551st Wing, the 552d assumed the responsibility for deploying EC-121s to Iceland.

In 1962, the wing began to support Project Mercury, and in April 1963, it participated in the recovery of Faith 7, and astronaut Gordon Cooper.

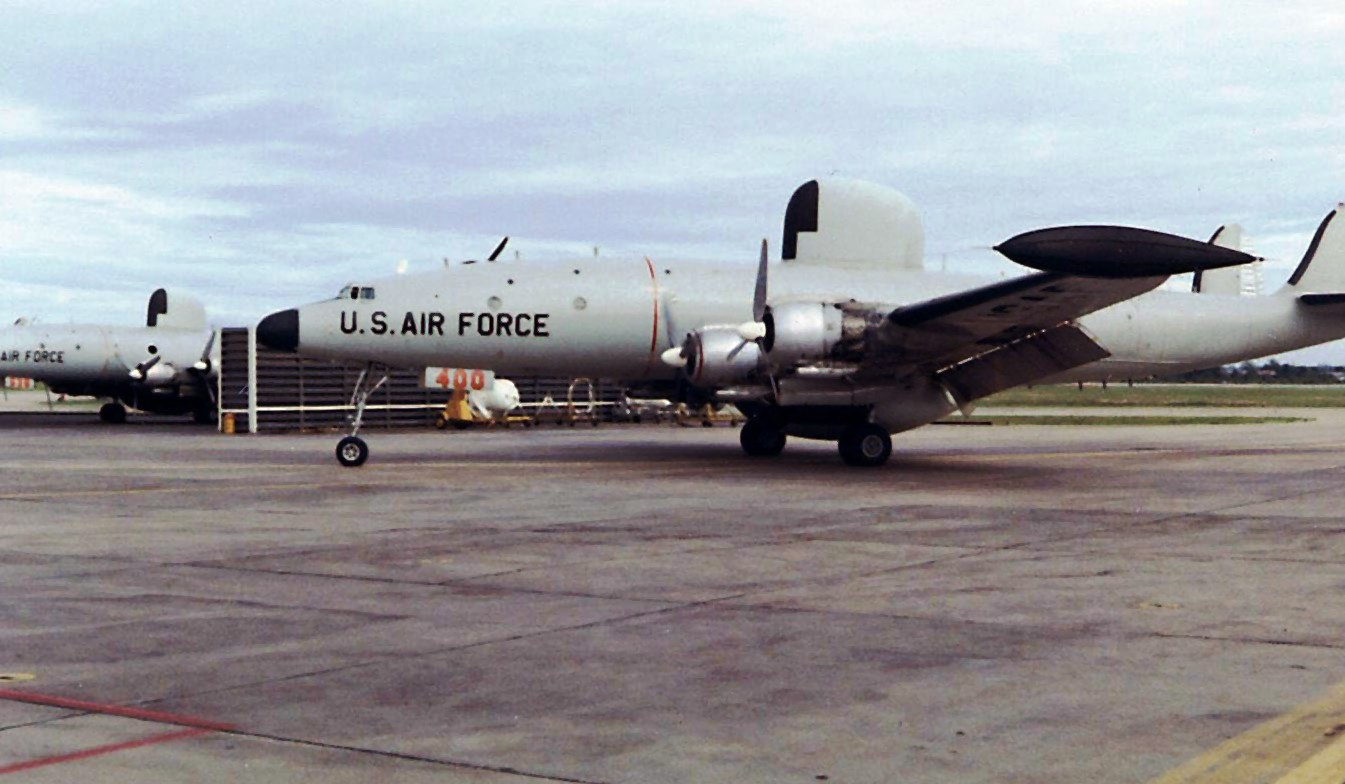
552d AEWCW EC-121Ds at Korat RTAFB in 1968.

The wing deployed aircraft to Florida during the Cuban Missile Crisis and its aftermath. It maintained Detachment 1 in Southeast Asia during the Vietnam War between 1965 and 1970. Detachment 1 returned to Southeast Asia in 1971 to support Operation Linebacker and Operation Linebacker II operations. On 15 August 1973, Detachment 1 EC-121s flew their final combat mission, and on 1 June 1974, the EC-121 was permanently withdrawn from Southeast Asia. Between 1965 and 1973 the EC-121s flew 13,921 combat missions; more than 98,000 accident-free flying hours; assisted in the shoot-down of 25 MiGs; and supported the rescue of 80 downed flyers. No aircraft were lost.

The wing's operational squadrons began to be reduced starting in 1969, and on 1 July 1974, with only a single flying squadron assigned, the Air Force redesignated the wing as the 552d Airborne Warning and Control Group. It was inactivated on 30 April 1976.

=== Reactivation at Tinker ===
However, its inactive status lasted less than a week, as the Air Force reactivated the unit on 5 May 1976, and redesignated it as the 552d Airborne Warning and Control Wing (AWACW). On 1 July 1976, the 552 AWACW relocated to Tinker AFB, Oklahoma. The 552 AWACW reported directly to Headquarters, Tactical Air Command (TAC).

On 1 October 1983, the 552 AWACW's missions and composition expanded so dramatically that the Air Force elevated the unit to division status and redesignated it as the 552d Airborne Warning and Control Division.

On 1 April 1985, TAC again redesignated the 552d Airborne Warning and Control Division and returned it to Wing status.

In October 1991, Tactical Air Command once more redesignated the 552d Airborne Warning and Control Wing, naming it the 552d Air Control Wing (ACW).

In the mid-1990s, an Air Force Reserve associate unit, the 513th Air Control Group (513 ACG), was activated, also at Tinker AFB, to provide extra crews for the wing.

==== Operational accomplishments ====
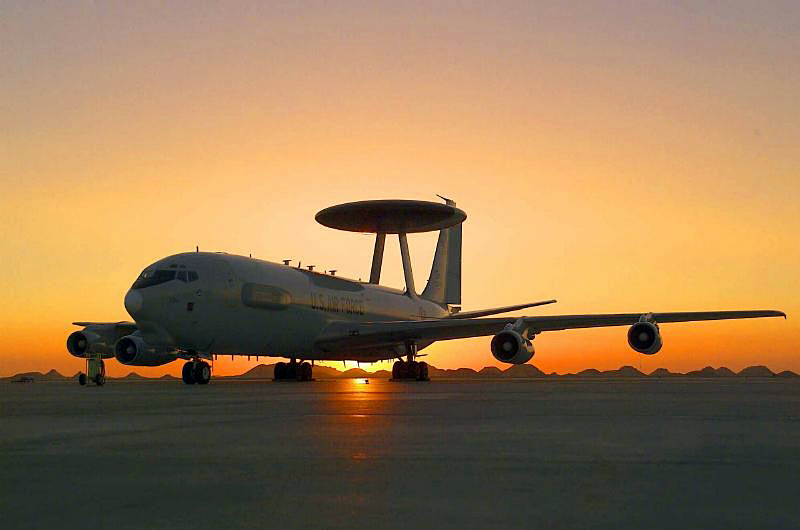
E-3 deployed in support of U.S. global operations

In early 1979, the wing assumed a commitment to support the North American Aerospace Defense Command (NORAD). Today wing crews still stand ready to fly daily on short notice to the borders of the United States and Canada providing additional radar coverage required in defense of the North American continent.

In September 1980, the wing deployed E-3s, aircrew, and support personnel to Saudi Arabia in support of Operation "ELF One" (European Liaison Force One) to provide "around-the-clock" airborne radar coverage, and to enhance Saudi Arabian air defenses during the dispute between Iran and Iraq. Support of "ELF One" continued for 8.5 years. Throughout the remainder of the 1980s, E-3, aircrew, and support personnel deployed to Ramstein Air Base, Germany to participate in joint training w/elements of the NATO air defense network in December 1980. Personnel deployed to Egypt following the assassination of Egyptian President Anwar Sadat in October 1981, and to Grenada in November 1983 to support Operation Urgent Fury. The wing supported Operation Just Cause, the ouster of Manuel Noriega in December 1989.

Also following President Ronald Reagan's National Security Decision Directive in 1986 to further expand its counter-narcotic operations, the wing marked the beginning of its anti-drug commitment. Within six months, the wing had assisted in 13 arrests and the seizure of 3,200 pounds of illegal drugs. In January 1990, the wing deployed personnel and several E-3s to Naval Station Roosevelt Roads, Puerto Rico. This deployment, known as Agate Path, established a forward operating base for counter-narcotic operations in the Central American region.

Other milestones during the 1980s included the delivery of the wing's 25th E-3 in December 1981, which brought a new updated version of the Airborne Warning and Control System, called the U.S./NATO standard, and the wing's redesignation to the 552d Airborne Warning and Control Division in October 1983. The division has again redesignated a wing, becoming a subordinate unit of the newly activated 28th Air Division in April 1985.

In August 1990, following the invasion of Kuwait by Iraqi forces, the wing deployed E-3s and personnel to Saudi Arabia and Turkey in support of Operation Desert Shield and Operation Proven Force, respectively. On 16 January 1991, E-3 support packages of the 552d Airborne Warning and Control Wing executed airborne control over several initial strikes on Iraq in Operation Desert Storm. Beginning on 17 January 1991, both deployed forces played a prominent role in f Operation Desert Storm. The E-3 aircraft and aircrews flew 7,314.7 combat hours during Desert Storm and controlled 20,401 air refueling sorties with tankers off-loading more than 178 million US gallons (670,000 m^{3}) of gas to 60,543 receivers. After the Gulf War, the wing remained in the Persian Gulf region. Wing personnel and aircraft in Southwest Asia continued a post-war surveillance role. In contrast, wing assets in Turkey continued to provide surveillance support for Operation Provide Comfort, the protection of Kurdish refugees.

During 1993, the 552d Air Control Wing continued its worldwide force protection mission in support of Operations Provide Comfort and Southern Watch in Southwest Asia. In January, a 552d Air Control Wing E-3 flying a Southern Watch mission over the Persian Gulf region guided an air strike against Iraqi ground targets in response to Iraqi violations of United Nations resolutions. Four days later, a wing E-3 guided a United States Air Force General Dynamics F-16 Fighting Falcon in the interception and destruction of an Iraqi MiG-29. This attack sequence followed a violation of the United Nations' imposed no-fly zone over Northern Iraq.

In September 1994, the wing flew 23 missions over Haiti in support of Operation Uphold Democracy from forward operating locations and Tinker AFB. This operation, directed by President Bill Clinton, ousted military leaders to return the duly-elected leader, Jean-Bertrand Aristide, into power.

In October 1995, the first E-3 AWACS aircraft (tail number 80-137) to receive the Block 30/35 upgrade rolled out at Tinker Air Force Base. The Block 30/35 comprised the single largest upgrade to the E-3 aircraft ever accomplished. Block 30/35 affected four major subsystems aboard the E-3 aircraft including the integration of Joint Tactical Information Distribution Systems, Global Position System, Electronic Support Measures System, and Data Analysis Program Group.

In July 1996, the Air Force Reserve activated the 513th Air Control Group. The group worked with the 552d Wing and the host reserve unit at Tinker, the 507th Air Refueling Wing. This activation would significantly impact the wing's ability to support its mission and improve the quality of life for the wing members, by reducing the number of temporary duty days the members would endure each year. The 513th's mission would parallel that of the 552d Wing. The 552d Air Control Wing maintained ownership of the E-3 aircraft but would allow the reservists to assist in the maintenance of the aircraft and fly missions with the E-3s.

In February 1998, the wing deployed more than 100 additional personnel in response to a buildup in Southwest Asia. Four months later, troops returned due to the reduction of forces directed by President Bill Clinton.

In mid-November 1998, wing members deployed to Southwest Asia to support Operation Desert Thunder. This operation was in response to United Nations weapons inspectors being expelled from Iraq. One month later, the wing members once again deployed to Southwest Asia in support of Operation Desert Fox, which was also in response to United Nations weapons inspectors being expelled from Iraq and the increase in no-fly zone violations.

In March 1999, the commander of the European Command requested that the 552d Air Control Wing adjust forces in the European theater in support of Operation Allied Force, NATO's response to the crisis in Kosovo. Again in April, the wing received a request for additional crews and aircraft supporting Operation Allied Force.

Also during the spring of 1999, the wing began to see the results of the Radar System Improvement Program (RSIP); the first AWACS E-3 aircraft to go through RSIP rolled out of the hangar. RSIP is a joint U.S./NATO development program involving a major hardware and software-intensive modification to the existing radar system. Installation of RSIP enhances the operational capability of the E-3 radar electronic counter-countermeasures and dramatically improves system reliability, maintainability, and availability.

In February 2001, the 552d Air Control Wing saw the final flight of an E-3 Airborne Warning and Control System's Block 20/25 aircraft (tail #75-57). In September 2001, the wing saw the completion of the Block 30/35 upgrade when that same aircraft rolled out of depot maintenance.

In March 2001, in an effort to bring the 552d Air Control Wing in alignment with the needs of the Expeditionary Aerospace Force, the 960th Airborne Warning and Control Squadron was reactivated and redesignated as the 960th Airborne Air Control Squadron.

On 14 June 2001, the RSIP program reached a major milestone. After more than ten years and the efforts of hundreds of people to develop, test, produce, and field the RSIP capability, Gen. John P. Jumper, Air Combat Command commander, approved the designation of Initial Operational Capability of the program.

Another major development in the history of AWACS occurred on 11 September 2001, with the terrorist attacks on the World Trade Center and the Pentagon. The 552d was one of the first units to be tasked by the North American Aerospace Defense Command to protect the airspace over North America as part of Operation Noble Eagle. Within hours, AWACS patrolled the skies over North America in homeland defense. Round-the-clock patrols continued until the Spring of 2002. By late September, the wing was also supporting the war on terrorism. On 27 September 2001, E-3 aircraft and AWACS personnel were deployed to a forward location in support of Operation Enduring Freedom. Also by late September, in addition to AWACS' worldwide taskings increasing, its number of people increased with the activation of 231 members of the 513th Air Control Group, the E-3 associate reserve unit. Both aircrew and support personnel in the 513th are seamlessly integrated into operations.

In October 2001, NATO sent 5 of their E-3s and 180 of their personnel to Tinker in support of Operation Eagle Assist. This was the first time in the 52-year history of the organization that it had been used to defend the United States. This action was one of eight measures taken by NATO in its first execution of Article 5 of the 1949 Washington Treaty that created NATO. Article 5 states that an attack on one member is an attack on all.

U.S. AWACS had flown more than 590 Noble Eagle missions by May, totaling nearly 7,100 flying hours supporting homeland defense operations. NATO AWACS had also flown approximately 380 ONE missions, totaling almost 4,300 flying hours in support of Operation Eagle Assist, NATO's support of Operation Noble Eagle. 16 May 2002 marked the end of Operation Eagle Assist, NATO's support of Operation Noble Eagle. NATO E-3s and personnel returned to their home station; however, the 552d Air Control Wing still supports ONE.

Thanksgiving of 2002 brought another first as a single Airborne Air Control Squadron deployed to Thumrait Air Base, Oman as the sole AACS supporting Operation Enduring Freedom. In January 2003, 5 E-3s, aircrew, and associated support personnel and equipment were redeployed from Thumrait, Oman to Prince Sultan Air Base, Saudi Arabia to join the largest deployment of AWACS aircraft, personnel, and equipment in preparation for Operation Iraqi Freedom.

April 2003 marked the beginning of the return of the wing from Prince Sultan Air Base, and by June all 552d Air Control Wing aircraft, personnel, and equipment were at home station. This marked the first-ever period of reconstitution for the wing. After almost 18 months of being at home, the wing re-entered the war on drugs with aircraft, personnel, and equipment deployment to Manta, Ecuador.

In the aftermath of Hurricane Katrina, the wing flew 16 contingency management missions totaling over 158 hours in 8 days. After Hurricane Rita, the wing again performed in a humanitarian aid capacity, flying 14 missions totaling over 117 hours.

In March 2007 the wing returned to the Middle East flying missions in support of Operations Iraqi and Enduring Freedom.

==== Major accidents ====
On 9 December 1983, the morning tanker mission for the ELF-1 orbiting E-3 protecting the Arabian oilfields from attack, took off from Riyadh Military airport along with seven Navy and Marine Corps officer observers, members of the Navy's Strategic Studies Group from Newport, RI. There were 12 souls on board, however, no additional parachutes were loaded aboard for these observers' use, if necessary. The E-3 Aircraft Commander and the crew were in their 7th hour of a normal 14-hour mission. The refueling was uneventful, but rather than the normal post-A/R vertical separation maneuver, the E-3 commander asked if it would be OK to join the tanker off the right wing so the passengers could get some good pictures. Contributing to the accident were the tanker pilot flying was in the left seat and the E-3 pilot flying was in the right seat. After several minutes on a collision course, the E-3 contacted the tanker's right wing with its left wing. The E-3 wing outside the number one engine broke off after cutting into the tanker's skin and severing the throttle cables. The wing pieces embedded themselves into the tanker fuselage, causing rapid decompression. A break-away maneuver was conducted, and the aircraft completed control checks. The tanker landed at Riyadh Military airport with two engines on one side, while the E-3 had to dump all the fuel it had just received before it could land there. The missing wing pieces that did not strike the tanker were never found and appeared to cause no damage on the ground. The investigating board recommended that both Rated E-3 pilots and the enlisted flight engineer be permanently assigned duties other than flying and that cameras not be allowed on the flight deck without Wing approval.

On 14 April 1994, two USAF McDonnell Douglas F-15 Eagles controlled by a 552d E-3 aircraft and aircrew accidentally shot down two US Army Sikorsky UH-60 Black Hawk helicopters while they passed through the northern Iraq no-fly zone. The F-15s had mistaken the two aircraft for Soviet-built Mil Mi-24 helicopters. This friendly fire incident led to the deaths of 26 people and galvanized national interest in E-3 activities. This accident also provided the genesis for a massive recertification process for all 1,300 airborne warning and control aircrew members. A senior mission crew member received a court-martial for dereliction of duty for this incident but was acquitted. The helicopter victims received purple hearts when the medal expanded eligibility to include friendly-fire wounds or death.

On 29 August 2009, an E-3 aircraft (83-0008) was written off following a hard landing at Nellis Air Force Base, Nevada. The landing broke the jet's nose landing gear, causing the plane to slide 4,500 feet down the runway before stopping. The aircraft's crew suffered only minor injuries. A subsequent Air Force investigation blamed the mishap on co-pilot error (as he had control of the aircraft during the landing procedure), saying that the aircraft's pilots lost track of the plane's altitude and rate of descent and reacted too late before the aircraft hit the runway. Neither pilot had more than a few hundred hours of flying time in the aircraft.

== Lineage ==
- Established as 552d Airborne Early Warning and Control Wing on 30 March 1955

Activated on 8 July 1955
Redesignated 552d Airborne Early Warning and Control Group on 1 July 1974
Inactivated on 30 April 1976

- Redesignated 552d Airborne Warning and Control Wing on 5 May 1976

Activated on 1 July 1976
Redesignated: 552d Airborne Warning and Control Division on 1 October 1983
Redesignated: 552d Airborne Warning and Control Wing on 1 April 1985
Redesignated: 552d Air Control Wing on 1 October 1991

=== Assignments ===
- 8th Air Division, 8 July 1955
- Western Air Defense Force, 1 July 1957
- 28th Air Division, 1 July 1960
- Fourth Air Force, 1 April 1966
- Tenth Air Force, 15 September 1969
- Aerospace Defense Command, 15 November 1969 – 30 April 1976
- Tactical Air Command, 1 July 1976
- 28th Air Division, 1 April 1985
- Tactical Air Command, 29 May 1992
- Air Combat Command, 1 June 1992
- Second Air Force, 1 October 1992
- Twelfth Air Force, 1 July 1993
- Eighth Air Force, 1 October 2002
- Twelfth Air Force, 1 November 2009 – 20 August 2020
- Fifteenth Air Force, 20 August 2020 - present

=== Components ===
Groups

- 552d Operations Group: 29 May 1992 – present
- 552d Air Control Group: 1 May 2008 – present

Squadrons

- 3d Airborne Command and Control Squadron: 1 August – 1 November 1986
- 7th Airborne Command and Control Squadron: 1 October 1976 – 1 April 1995
- 8th Tactical Deployment Control Squadron: 1 January 1978 – 1 March 1986
- 41st Electronic Combat Squadron: 1 July 1980 – 1 April 1985
- 960th Airborne Warning and Control Support Squadron (later 960th Airborne Warning and Control Squadron): 1 September 1979 – 1 April 1985; 1 Mar 2001 – present
- 961st Airborne Warning and Control Support Squadron (later 961st Airborne Warning and Control Squadron): 1 October 1979 – 1 April 1985 (Reactivated and reassigned to 18th Wing, PACAF, in 1991)
- 963d Airborne Early Warning and Control Squadron (later 963d Airborne Warning and Control Squadron): 8 July 1955 – 30 April 1976; 1 July 1976 – present
- 964th Airborne Early Warning and Control Squadron (later 964th Airborne Warning and Control Squadron): 8 July 1955 – 30 June 1974; 1 July 1977 – present
- 965th Airborne Early Warning and Control Squadron (later 965th Airborne Warning and Control Squadron): 8 August 1955 – 30 June 1971; 1 July 1978 – present
- 966th Airborne Early Warning and Control Squadron (later 966th Airborne Warning and Control Training Squadron): 1 May 1963 – 1 July 1969; 15 November – 31 December 1969; 1 July 1976 – present.

=== Stations ===
- McClellan Air Force Base, California, 8 July 1955 – 30 April 1976
- Tinker Air Force Base, Oklahoma, 1 July 1976 – present
