= 8th Air Division =

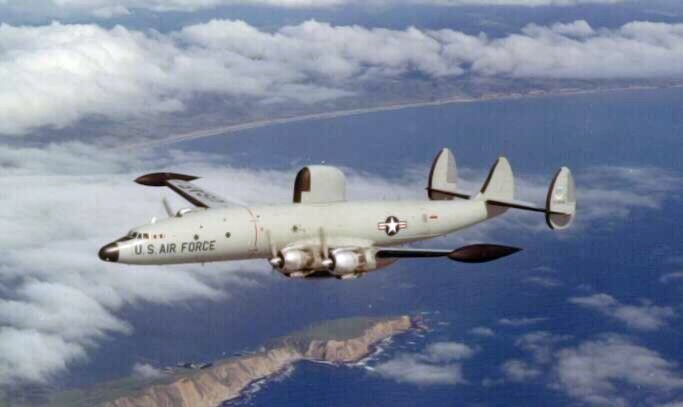
- Lockheed EC-121D as flown by the division
- Active: 1949–1957
- Country: United States
- Branch: United States Air Force
- Role: Command and Control
- Part of: Air Defense Command

Insignia
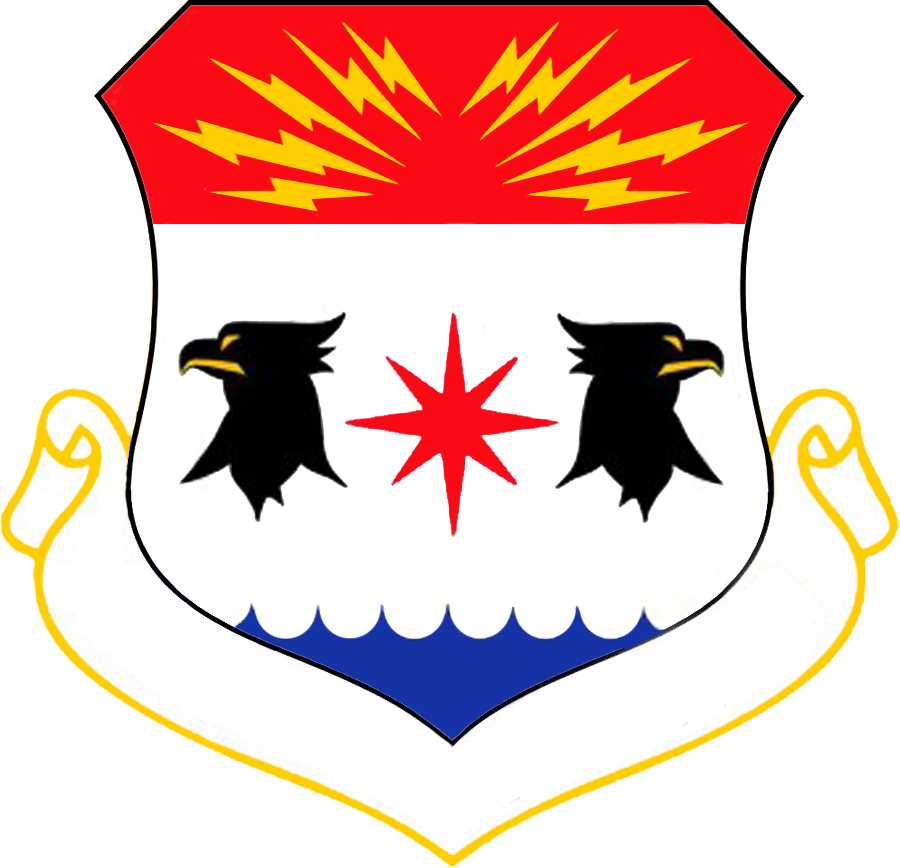
- 8th Air Division emblem (approved 21 June 1957)

The 8th Air Division (8th AD) is an inactive United States Air Force organization. Its last assignment was with Air Defense Command, being stationed at McClellan Air Force Base, California. It was inactivated on 1 July 1957.

== History ==
The 8th AD was established in 1949. Its initial assignment was the air defense of North and South Carolina under Fourteenth Air Force. It was inactivated in 1950 with its air defense mission taken over by Eastern Air Defense Force.

In 1954 it was re-activated under Western Air Defense Force with a mission of being the command and control organization for Airborne early warning and control (AEW&C) units of Air Defense Command. Its mission also included the training and equipping of Lockheed EC-121 Warning Star AEW&C units.

Division components flew early warning missions in "flying radar stations" off the Atlantic and Pacific coasts of the United States until its inactivation in July 1957, its mission being taken over directly by the Western Air Defense Force.

== Lineage ==
- Established as the 8th Air Division (Tactical) on 7 April 1949

Activated on 1 May 1949.
Inactivated on 1 August 1950

- Redesignated 8th Air Division (Airborne Early Warning and Control) on 19 April 1954

Activated on 1 May 1954
Inactivated on 1 July 1957

=== Assignments ===
- Fourteenth Air Force, 1 May 1949 – 1 August 1950
- Western Air Defense Force, 1 May 1954
- Air Defense Command, 1 May 1955 - 1 July 1957

=== Stations ===
- Pope Air Force Base, North Carolina, 1 May 1949 – 1 August 1950
- McClellan Air Force Base, California, 1 May 1954 - 1 July 1957

=== Components ===
Wings

- 551st Airborne Early Warning and Control Wing: 18 December 1954 – 1 July 1957

Otis Air Force Base, Massachusetts

- 552d Airborne Early Warning and Control Wing: 8 July 1955 – 1 July 1957.

McClellan Air Force Base, California

Squadrons

- 963d Airborne Early Warning and Control Squadron: 8 March - 8 July 1955

McClellan Air Force Base, California

- 964th Airborne Early Warning and Control Squadron: 8 March - 8 July 1955

McClellan Air Force Base, California

- 4701st Airborne Early Warning and Control Squadron: 1 May 1954 – 8 March 1955

McClellan Air Force Base, California

- 4712th Airborne Early Warning and Control: 25 May 1954 – 8 March 1955.

McClellan Air Force Base, California

== See also ==
- List of USAF Aerospace Defense Command General Surveillance Radar Stations
- Aerospace Defense Command Fighter Squadrons
- List of United States Air Force air divisions
