= 960th Airborne Air Control Squadron =

960th Airborne Air Control Squadron

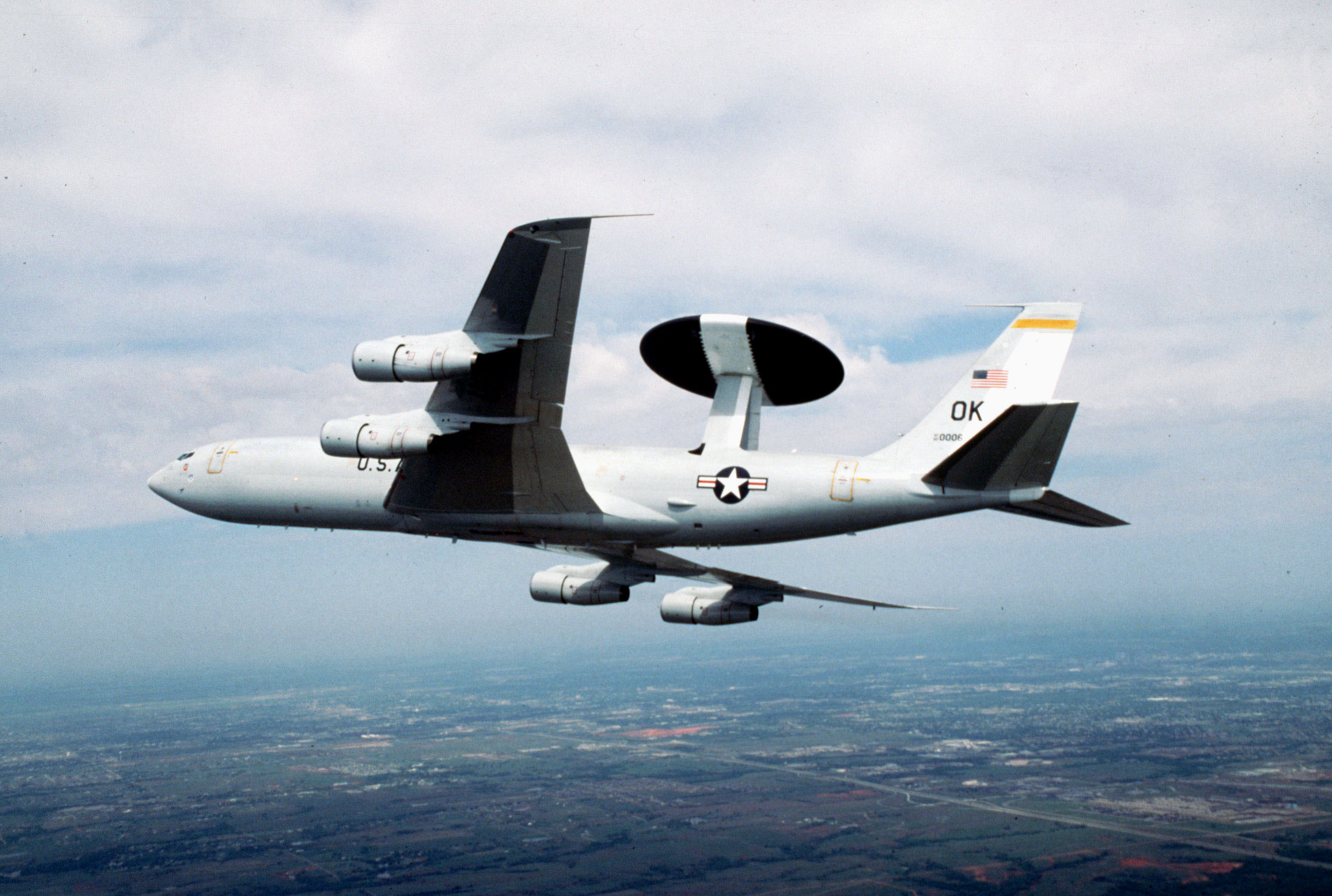
- 552d Wing Boeing E-3 Sentry
- Active: 1941–1944; 1944–1945; 1955–1969; 1979–1992; 2001–present
- Country: United States
- Branch: United States Air Force
- Type: Airborne Command and Control
- Part of: Air Combat Command
- Garrison/HQ: Tinker Air Force Base
- Engagements: Pacific Ocean Theater
- Decorations: Distinguished Unit Citation; Air Force Outstanding Unit Award with Combat "V" Device; Air Force Meritorious Unit Award; Air Force Outstanding Unit Award

Insignia
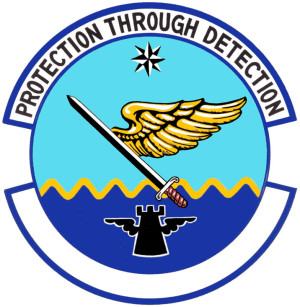
- 960th Airborne Air Control Squadron emblem (Note: Approved 8 May 1980.)

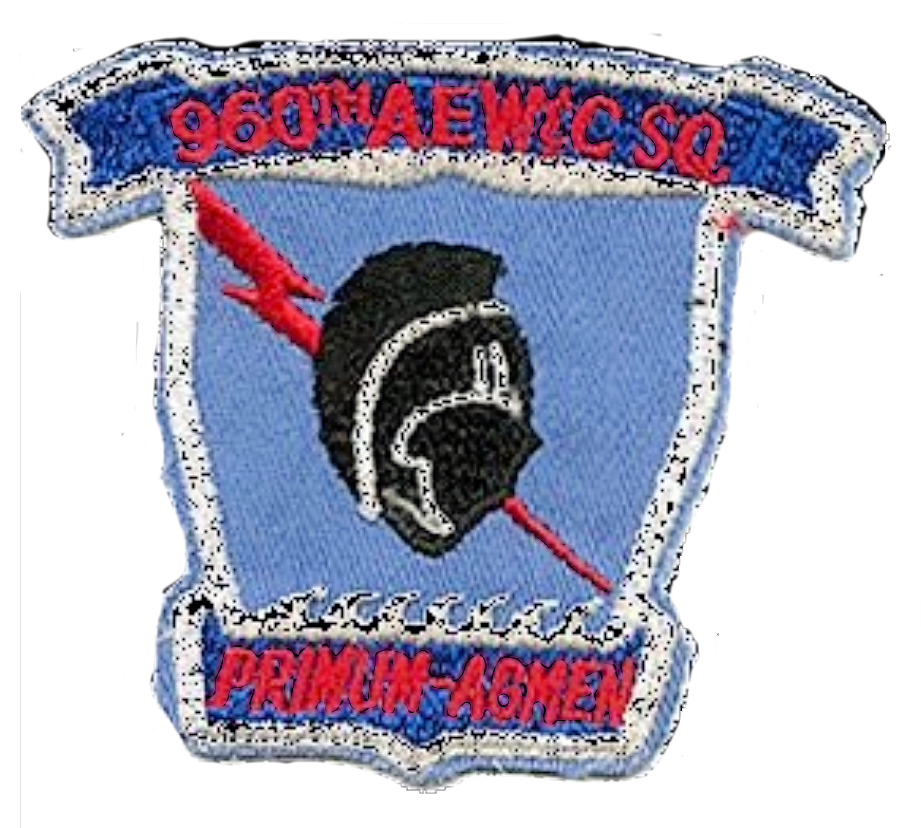
- Patch with 960th Airborne Early Warning and Control Squadron emblem (Note: Approved 25 June 1956.)

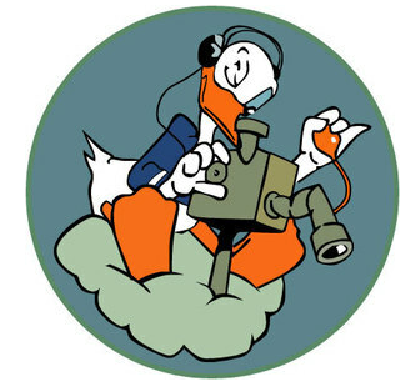
- 60th Bombardment Squadron emblem
- World War II tail code and squadron numbers: Square P Numbers 1-20

The 960th Airborne Air Control Squadron is part of the 552d Air Control Wing at Tinker Air Force Base, Oklahoma. It operates the E-3 Sentry aircraft conducting airborne command and control missions.

The first predecessor of the squadron was activated in the buildup for World War II as the 60th Bombardment Squadron. Following the attack on Pearl Harbor, it flew antisubmarine patrols off the north Pacific coast. It then became a heavy bomber training unit until inactivating in the spring of 1944 when the Army Air Forces reorganized its training and support units in the United States. It was immediately reactivated as a Boeing B-29 Superfortress unit. After training in the United States, it moved to Guam, where it participated in the strategic bombing campaign against Japan, earning two Distinguished Unit Citations for its actions. Following V-J Day, it returned to the United States and was inactivated in 1945.

The squadron's second predecessor was activated in 1955 as the 960th Airborne Early Warning and Control Squadron. It provided early warning off the Atlantic coast of the United States until 1969. The squadron also provided aircraft and aircrew for Lockheed C-121 missions in Southeast Asa. It was reactivated in 1979 as the 960th Airborne Air Control Support Squadron. The two squadrons were consolidated in 1985.

== Mission ==
Provide the Combat Air Force with airborne systems and personnel for surveillance, warning and control of strategic, tactical, and special mission forces.

== History ==
=== World War II ===
==== Organization and crew training ====
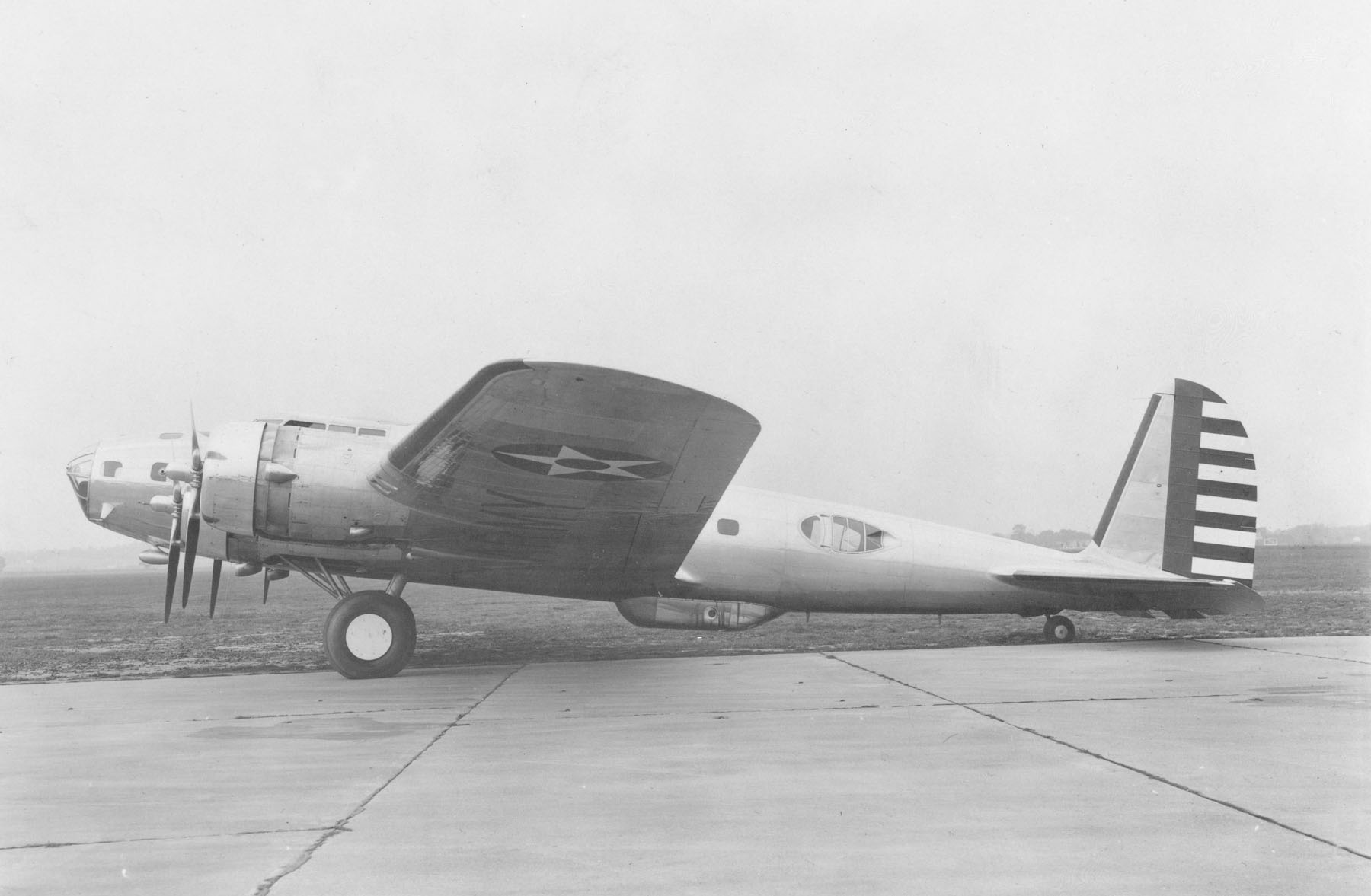
Boeing B-17C

The first predecessor of the squadron was initially activated at Fort Douglas, Utah in January 1941 as the 60th Bombardment Squadron, one of the three original bombardment squadrons of the 39th Bombardment Group. (Note: The 39th Group also had an attached reconnaissance squadron. This soon became the fourth bombardment squadron of the group. Maurer, Combat Squadrons, pp. 491-492.) The squadron flew Boeing B-17 Flying Fortresses, although as it was organizing, it also flew some North American B-25 Mitchells. While stationed at Fort Douglas, the squadron conducted flight operations from Salt Lake City Municipal Airport. In July 1941, the squadron moved with the 39th Group to Geiger Field, Washington.

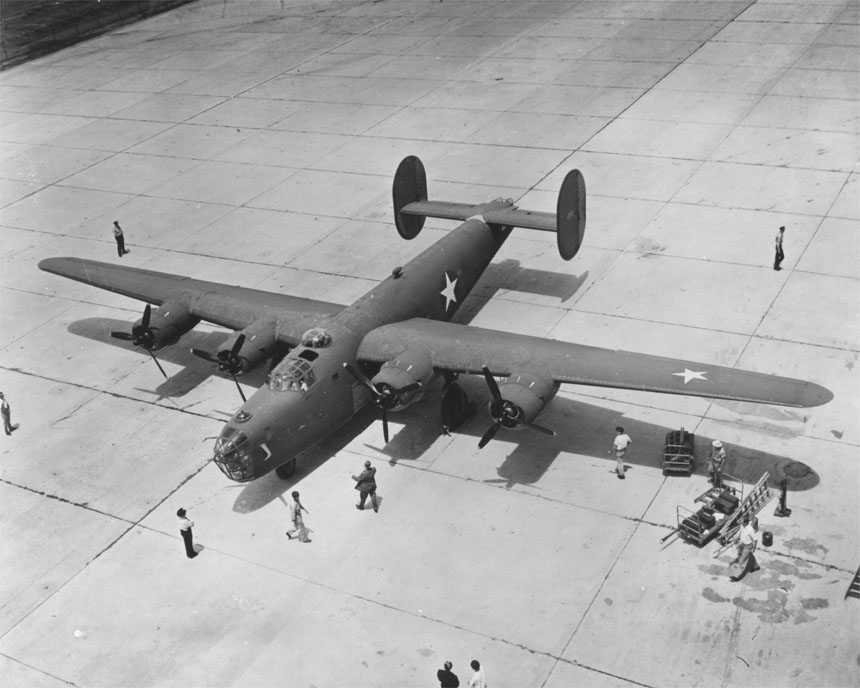
Consolidated B-24E

Following the Attack on Pearl Harbor, the squadron flew antisubmarine patrols off the Pacific Coast until February 1942, when it moved to Davis-Monthan Field, Arizona. At Davis-Monthan, it converted to Consolidated B-24 Liberators. With its Liberators, the squadron became an Operational Training Unit (OTU). The OTU program involved the use of an oversized parent unit to provide cadres to "satellite groups" It then assumed responsibility for their training and oversaw their expansion with graduates of Army Air Forces Training Command schools to become effective combat units. The OTU program was patterned after the unit training system of the Royal Air Force. Phase I training concentrated on individual training in crewmember specialties. Phase II training emphasized the coordination for the crew to act as a team. The final phase concentrated on operation as a unit.

By late 1943 most of the Army Air Forces (AAF)'s units had been activated and almost three quarters of them had deployed overseas. With the exception of special programs, like forming Boeing B-29 Superfortress units, training “fillers” for existing units became more important than unit training. The squadron mission changed to that of a Replacement Training Unit (RTU). The RTU was also an oversized unit, but its mission was to train individual pilots or aircrews.

However, the AAF was finding that standard military units like the 60th, whose manning was based on relatively inflexible tables of organization were proving not well adapted to the training mission, even more so to the replacement mission. Accordingly, the Army Air Forces adopted a more functional system in which each base was organized into a separate numbered unit. Most of the OTUs and RTUs were inactivated or disbanded and training activities given to these base units. The 39th Group and its components were inactivated, and along with supporting units at Davis-Monthan, replaced by the 233rd AAF Base Unit (Combat Crew Training School, Bombardment, Heavy).

==== B-29 Superfortress operations against Japan ====
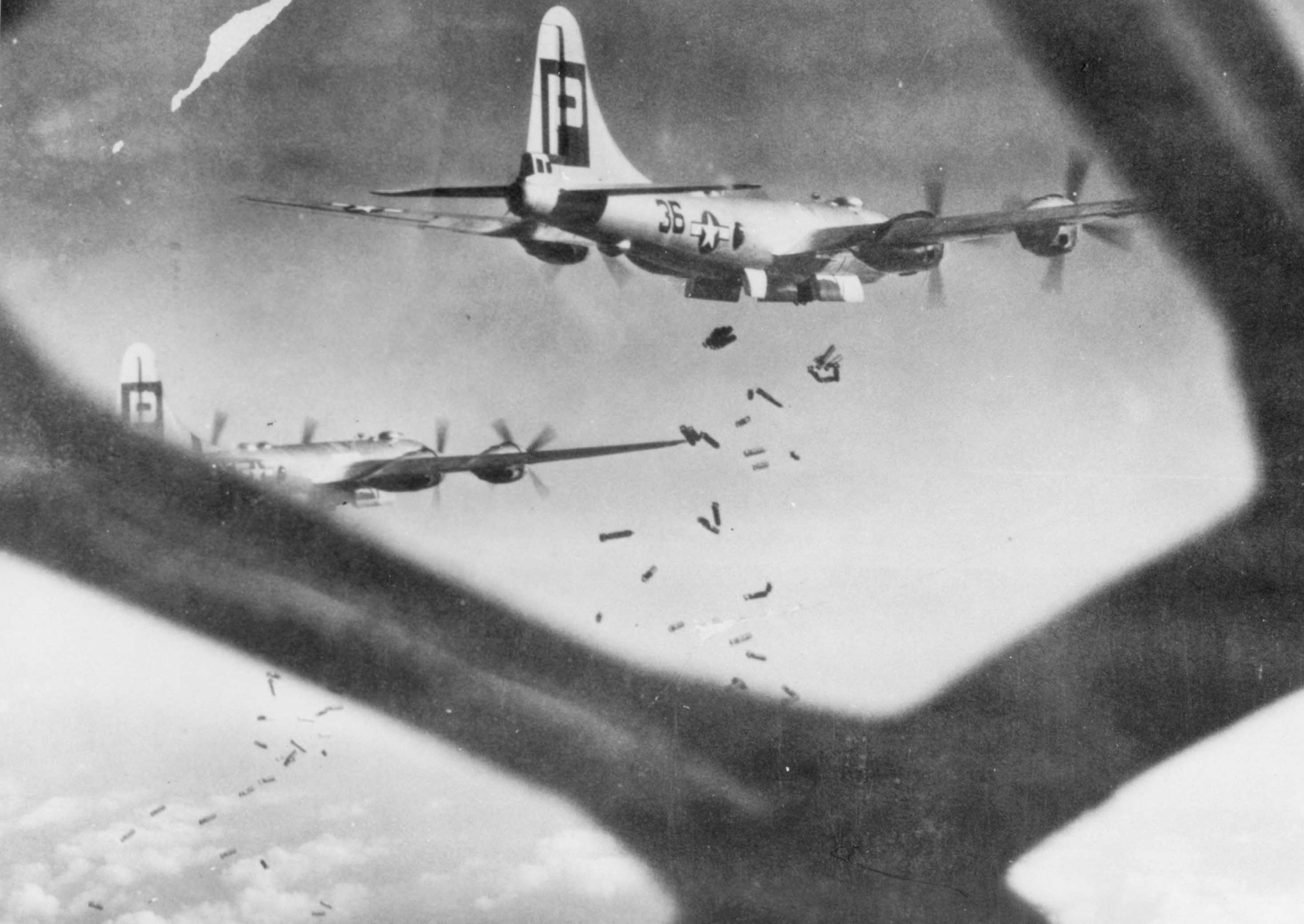
39th Bombardment Group B-29s bombing Japan

The 39th Group and its squadrons, including the 60th, were activated the same day at Smoky Hill Army Air Field, Kansas as B-29 Superfortress units. When training was completed moved to North Field Guam in the Mariana Islands of the Central Pacific Area in January 1945 and assigned to XXI Bomber Command, Twentieth Air Force. Its mission was the strategic bombardment of the Japanese Home Islands and the destruction of its war-making capability.

Flew "shakedown" missions against Japanese targets on Moen Island, Truk, and other points in the Carolines and Marianas. The squadron began combat missions over Japan on 25 February 1945 with a firebombing mission over Northeast Tokyo. The squadron continued to participate in wide area firebombing attack, but the first ten-day blitz resulting in the Army Air Forces running out of incendiary bombs. Until then the squadron flew conventional strategic bombing missions using high explosive bombs.

The squadron continued attacking urban areas with incendiary raids until the end of the war in August 1945, attacking major Japanese cities, causing massive destruction of urbanized areas. Also conducted raids against strategic objectives, bombing aircraft factories, chemical plants, oil refineries, and other targets in Japan. The squadron flew its last combat missions on 14 August when hostilities ended. Afterwards, its B 29s carried relief supplies to Allied prisoner of war camps in Japan and Manchuria

Squadron remained in Western Pacific, although largely demobilized in the fall of 1945. Some aircraft scrapped on Tinian; others flown to storage depots in the United States. Inactivated as part of Army Service forces at the end of 1945.

=== Air Defense Command ===
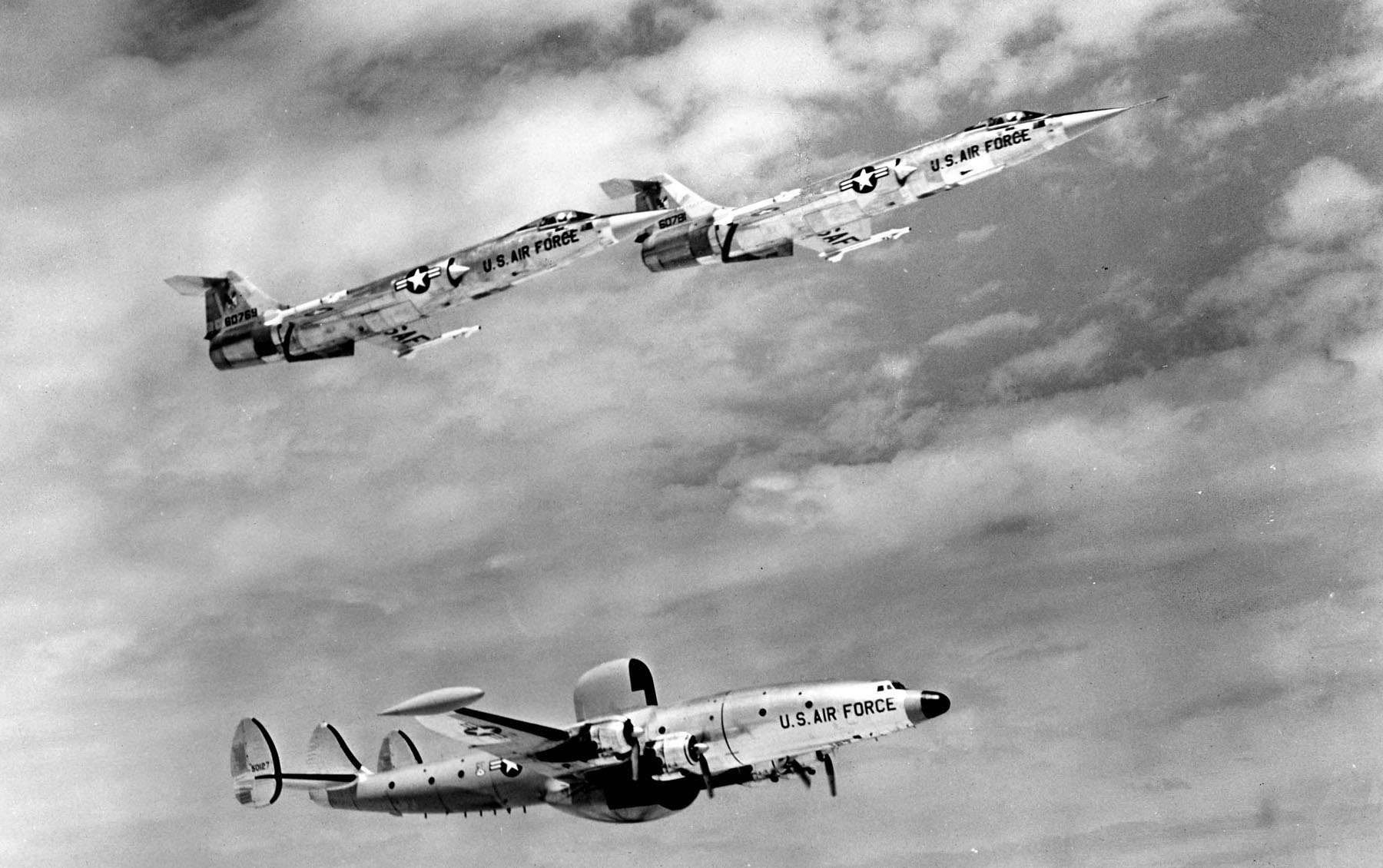
Lockheed F-104As & EC-121 of the 552d Wing

It provided early warning radar surveillance along the East Coast of the United States from, 1955–1969. It supported two deployed rotating aircraft with crews in Iceland to provide early detection of Soviet aircraft flying between Iceland and Greenland from 1979 to 1992.

=== Airborne air control ===
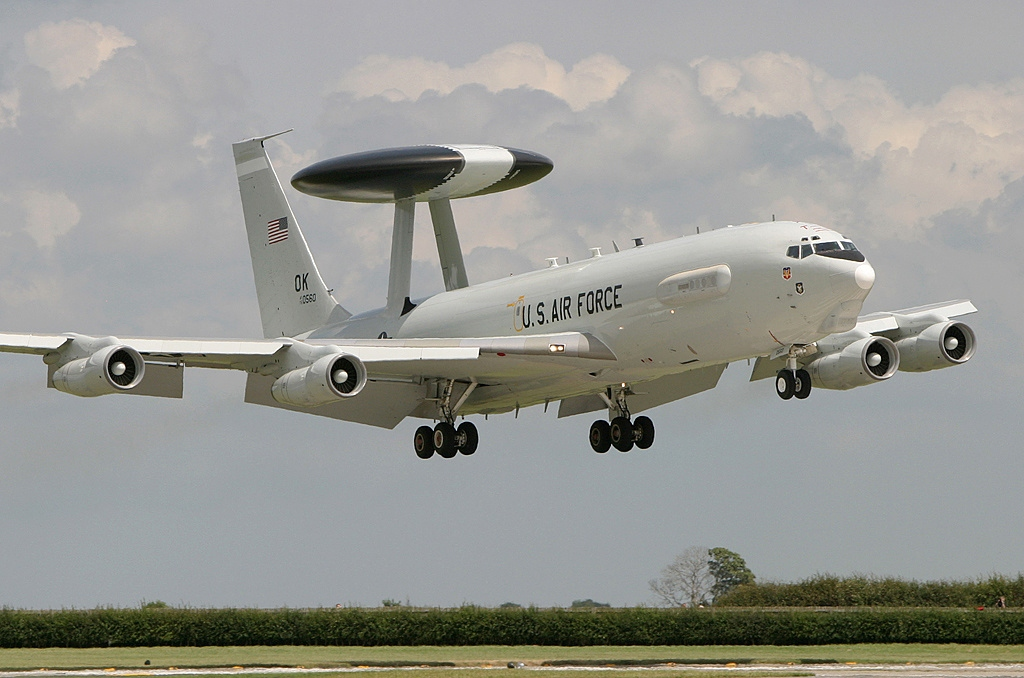
552d Wing Boeing E-3B Sentry

=== Operations and decorations ===
- Combat Operations: Conducted bombardment missions against Japan, c. 6Apr-14 Aug 1945. Supported two deployed rotating aircraft with crews in Iceland to provide early detection of Soviet aircraft flying between Iceland and Greenland, 1979–1992.
- Campaigns: World War II: Western Pacific; Air Offensive, Japan.
- Decorations: Distinguished Unit Citations: Japan, 10 May 1945; Tokyo and Yokohama, Japan, 23–29 May 1945. Air Force Outstanding Unit Awards: 1 Jul 1957-31 Oct 1958; [1 Sep 1979]-30 Jun 1980; 1 Jul 1982-30 Jun 1984; 1 Apr 1987-31 Mar 1989; 1 Dec 1989-1 Dec 1991.

== Lineage ==
60th Bombardment Squadron

- Constituted as the 60th Bombardment Squadron (Heavy) on 20 November 1940

Activated on 15 January 1941
Inactivated on 1 April 1944

- Redesignated 60th Bombardment Squadron, Very Heavy and activated, on 1 April 1944

Inactivated on 27 December 1945
Consolidated with the 960th Airborne Air Control Squadron as the 960th Airborne Air Control Squadron on 19 September 1985

960th Airborne Air Control Squadron

- Constituted as the 960th Airborne Early Warning and Control Squadron on 8 December 1954

Activated on 8 March 1955
Inactivated on 31 July 1969

- Redesignated 960th Airborne Warning and Control Support Squadron on 31 July 1979

Activated on 1 September 1979
Redesignated 960th Airborne Warning and Control Squadron on 1 January 1982

- Consolidated with the 60th Bombardment Squadron which on 19 September 1985

Inactivated on 1 July 1992

- Redesignated 960th Airborne Air Control Squadron on 26 January 2001

Activated on 1 March 2001.

=== Assignments ===
- 39th Bombardment Group, 15 January 1941 – 1 April 1944
- 39th Bombardment Group, 1 April 1944 – 27 December 1945
- 551st Airborne Early Warning and Control Wing, 8 March 1955 – 31 July 1969
- 552d Airborne Warning and Control Wing (later 552d Airborne Warning and Control Division), 1 September 1979
- 28th Air Division, 1 April 1985
- 552d Operations Group, 29 May – 1 July 1992
- 552d Operations Group, 1 March 2001 – present

=== Stations ===
- Fort Douglas, Utah, 15 January 1941
- Felts Field, Washington, 2 June 1941
- Geiger Field, Washington, 2 July 1941
- Davis-Monthan Field, Arizona, 2 February 1942 – 1 April 1944
- Smoky Hill Army Air Field, Kansas, 1 April 1944
- Dalhart Army Air Field, Texas, 27 May 1944
- Smoky Hill Army Air Field, Kansas, 17 July 1944 – 8 January 1945
- North Field, Guam, 18 February – 16 November 1945
- Camp Anza, California, 15–27 December 1945
- Otis Air Force Base, Massachusetts, 8 March 1955 – 31 July 1969
- Naval Air Station Keflavik, Iceland, 1 September 1979 – 1 July 1992
- Tinker Air Force Base, Oklahoma, 1 March 2001 – present

=== Aircraft ===
- Boeing B-17 Flying Fortress (1941–1942)
- North American B-25 Mitchell (1941)
- Consolidated B-24 Liberator (1942–1944)
- Boeing B-29 Superfortress (1944–1945)
- Lockheed RC-121 Warning Star (1955–1969)
- Lockheed EC-121 Warning Star (1955–1969)
- E-3 Sentry (1979–1992, 2001–present)
