= 963rd Airborne Air Control Squadron =

963d Airborne Air Control Squadron
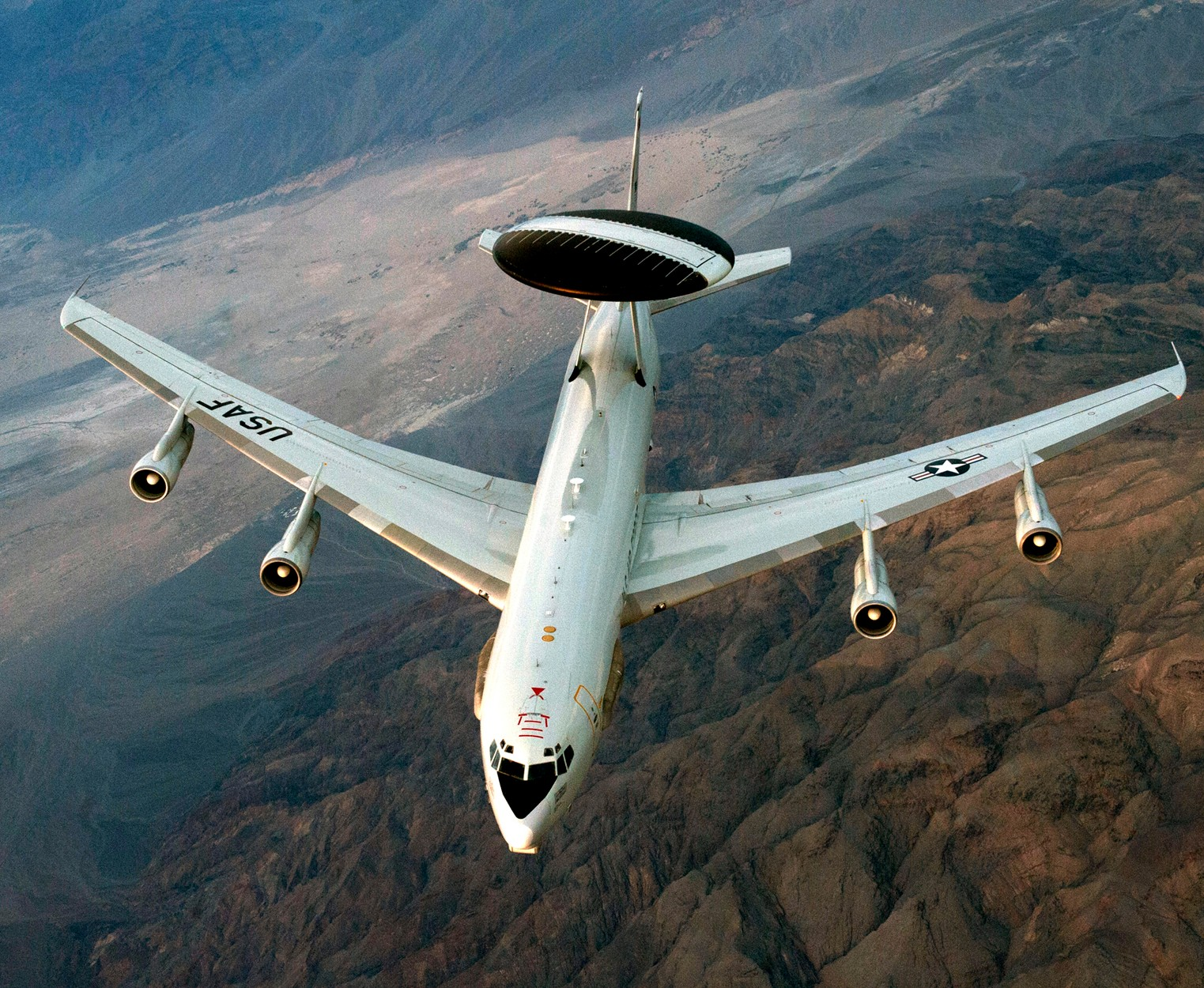
- E-3 AWACS Aircraft
- Active: 1942-1944; 1944-1946; 1946-1949; 1954-1976; 1976-present
- Country: United States
- Branch: United States Air Force
- Type: Squadron
- Role: Airborne command and control
- Part of: Air Combat Command
- Garrison/HQ: Tinker Air Force Base
- Nickname(s): Blue Knights
- Engagements: Desert Storm/Desert Shield; Iraq War
- Decorations: Air Force Outstanding Unit Award with Combat "V" Device; Air Force Outstanding Unit Award; Republic of Vietnam Gallantry Cross with Palm

Insignia
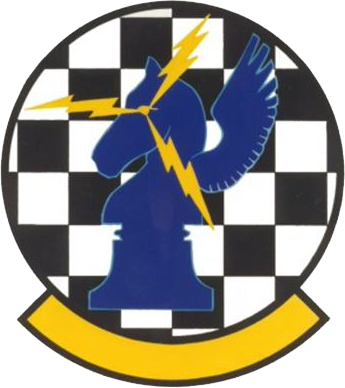
- 963d Airborne Air Control Squadron emblem (Note: Approved 24 May 1977.)

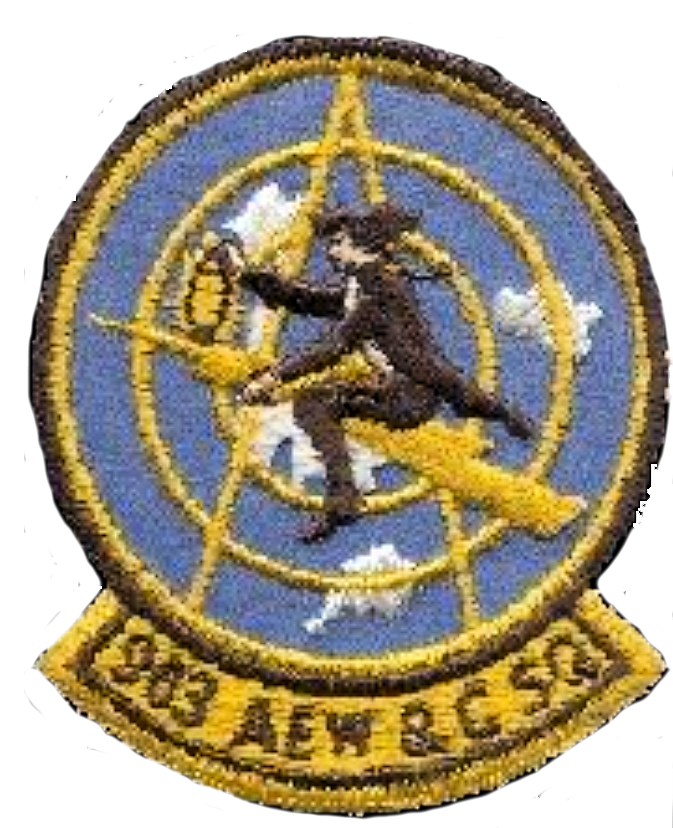
- Patch with 963d Airborne Early Warning and Control Squadron emblem (Note: Approved 15 August 1956.)

The 963d Airborne Air Control Squadron is a squadron of the United States Air Force based at Tinker Air Force Base, Oklahoma. The squadron is a subordinate unit of the 552d Operations Group and it flies the Boeing E-3 Sentry radar surveillance aircraft. The squadron currently falls under the authority of Air Combat Command and Twelfth Air Force.

== Emblem ==
The 963d's mascot is the Blue Knight which is represented on the unit's insignia as a blue colored winged chess knight. The background is a series of black and white squares that resembles a chess board. Three bolts of lightning emitted from the knight's eye shows the lightning fast deployability of the AWACS, and the knight's wings represents the flying mission of the unit.

== History ==
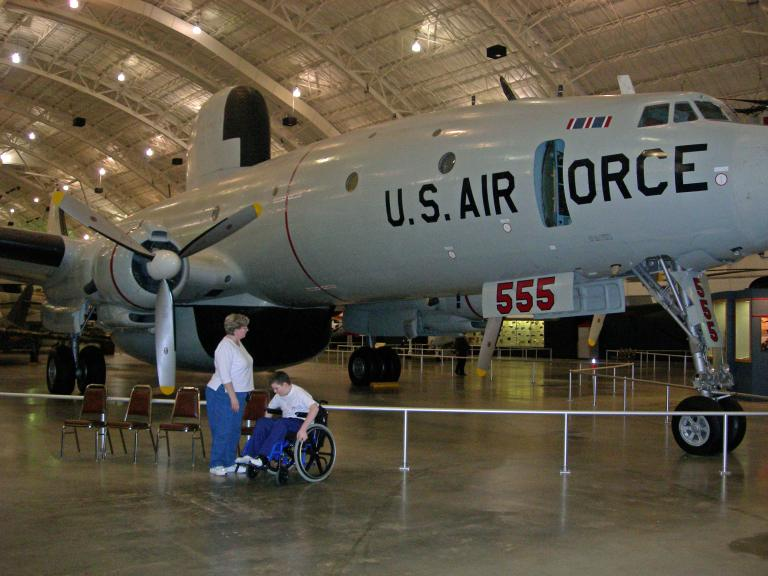
EC-121 aircraft

The 963d Airborne Early Warning and Control Squadron was activated, on 8 July 1955 at McClellan Air Force Base, California. The squadron flew the EC-121 Warning Star, which was a military version of the Lockheed Constellation aircraft, until the unit's inactivation in April 1976.

The inactivation lasted less than a week however, as the Air Force again activated the unit on 5 May 1976 and redesignated it as the 963d Airborne Warning and Control Squadron (963 AWACS). On 1 July 1976, the squadron relocated to Tinker AFB, Oklahoma. The squadron was under the command of the 552 AWACW, which reported directly to Headquarters, Tactical Air Command. The squadron began flying the new E-3 Sentry aircraft upon being reactivated. This new airframe is a military version of the Boeing 707 aircraft.

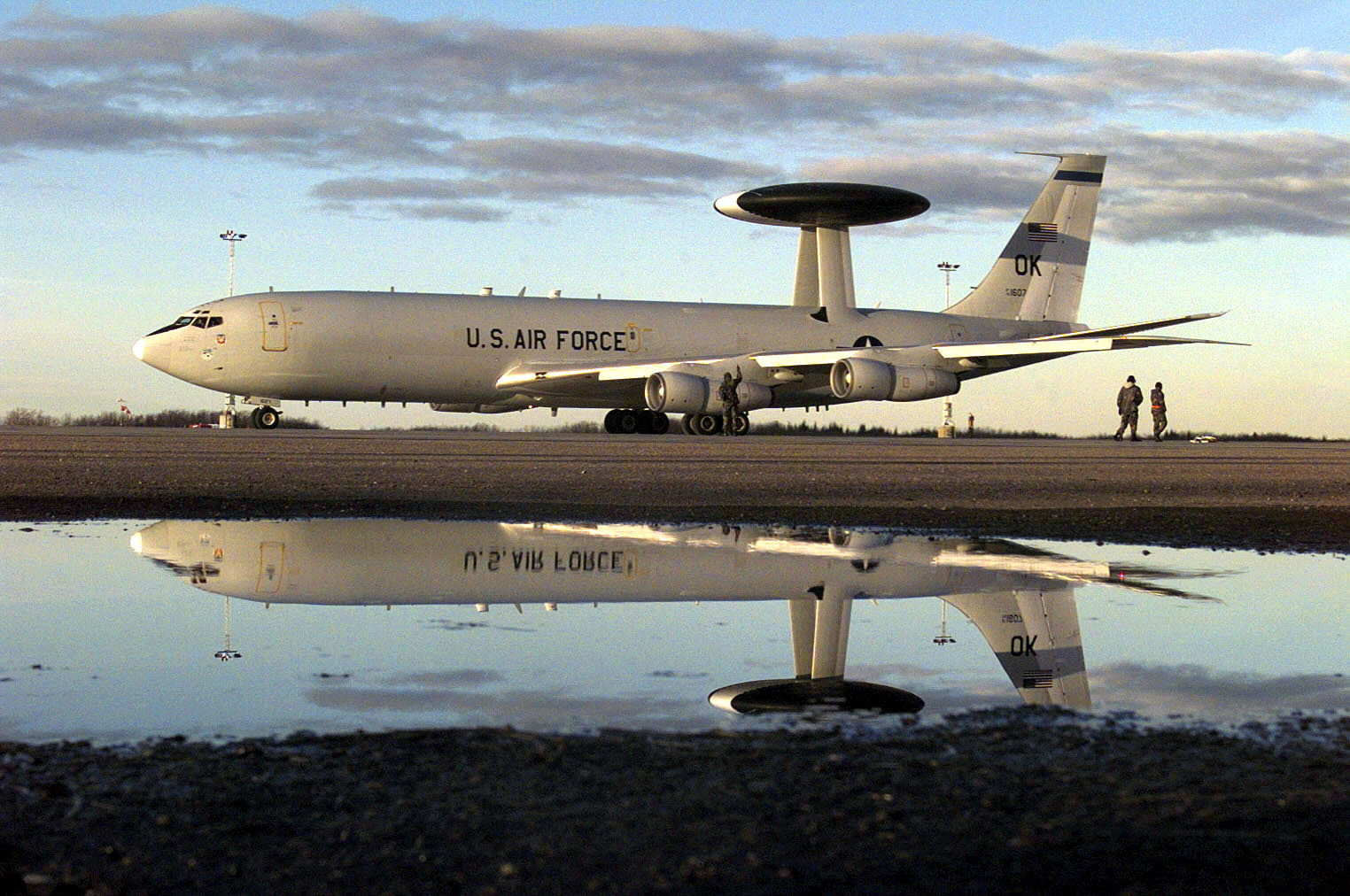
963d aircraft on the flight line

During the 1980s the squadron flew training missions in Saudi Arabia and throughout the Middle East.

In 1990 the squadron deployed to Riyadh AB, Saudi Arabia with the military build-up prior to Operations Desert Shield/Desert Storm.

In 1992, the unit (and its superior unit the 552 Wing) came under the authority of the newly formed Air Combat Command. Throughout the early to mid-1990s, 963d aircrews routinely deployed to Incirlik AB, Turkey to support the northern Iraqi no-fly zone (Operation Provide Comfort). Crews from the 963d also continued operations in Saudi Arabia on the southern no-fly zone (Operation Southern Watch). They were also deployed to other trouble spots around the world as a modern form of Gunboat diplomacy. On 14 April 1994, an aircraft and crew from the 963d operating out of Incirlik Air Base, Turkey featured prominently in the 1994 Black Hawk shootdown incident.

In 1994, the squadron's name was redesignated to 963d Airborne Air Control Squadron.

The 963d AACS also participated in the invasion of Iraq in Operation Iraqi Freedom.

=== Operations ===
- World War II
- Vietnam War
- Operation Just Cause
- Operation Earnest Will
- Operation Desert Storm
- Operation Iraqi Freedom

== Lineage ==
3 Search Attack Squadron

- Constituted as the 3d Sea-Search Attack Squadron (Heavy) on 7 December 1942
- Activated on 10 December 1942

Redesignated 3d Search Attack Squadron (Heavy) on 22 November 1943

- Disbanded on 10 April 1944
- Reconstituted on 19 September 1985 and consolidated with the 163d Liaison Squadron and the 963d Airborne Warning and Control Squadron as the 963d Airborne Warning and Control Squadron

163d Liaison Squadron

- Constituted as the 163d Liaison Squadron on 11 May 1944

Activated on 15 May 1944
Inactivated on 27 January 1946
Activated on 3 October 1946
Inactivated on 1 April 1949

- Consolidated on 19 September 1985 with the 3d Search Attack Squadron and the 963d Airborne Warning and Control Squadron as the 963d Airborne Warning and Control Squadron

963d Airborne Air Control Squadron

- Constituted as the 963d Airborne Early Warning and Control Squadron on 8 December 1954

Activated on 8 March 1955
Inactivated on 30 April 1976

- Redesignated 963d Airborne Warning and Control Squadron on 5 May 1976

Activated on 1 Jul 1976

- Consolidated on 19 September 1985 with the 3d Search Attack Squadron and the 163d Liaison Squadron
- Redesignated 963d Airborne Air Control Squadron on 1 July 1994

=== Assignments ===
- 1st Sea–Search Attack Group (later 1st Sea-Search Attack Unit; 1st Search Attack Group), 10 December 1942 – 10 April 1944
- III Tactical Air Division, 15 May 1944
- Army Air Forces, Pacific Ocean Areas, 20 January 1945 (attached to Tenth Army for operations)
- Seventh Air Force, 14 July 1945 (remained attached to Tenth Army until 10 August 1945)
- VII Bomber Command, 1 December 1945
- Pacific Air Command, United States Army, 25 December 1945 – 27 January 1946
- Ninth Air Force, 3 October 1946
- Tenth Air Force, 1 December 1948 – 1 April 1949
- 8th Air Division, 8 March 1955 (attached to Airborne Early Warning and Control Wing, Provisional until 7 July 1955)
- 552d Airborne Early Warning and Control Wing (later 552d Airborne Warning and Control Group), 8 July 1955 – 30 April 1976
- 552d Airborne Warning and Control Wing (later 552d Airborne Warning and Control Division, 552d Airborne Warning and Control Wing, 552d Air Control Wing), 1 July 1976
- 552d Operations Group, 29 May 1992 – present

=== Bases stationed ===
- Langley Field, Virginia, 10 December 1942 – 10 April 1944
- Cox Field, Texas, 15 May 1944
- Brownwood Army Air Field, Texas, 8 October 1944 – 1 January 1945
- Schofield Barracks, Hawaii, 20 January – 6 April 1945
- Kadena Air Force Base, Okinawa, 3 May 1945
- Fort William McKinley, Luzon, Philippines, c. 24 December 1945 – 27 January 1946
- Marshall Field (later Marshall Air Force Base), Kansas, 3 October 1946 – 1 April 1949
- McClellan Air Force Base, California, 8 March 1955 – 30 April 1976
- Tinker Air Force Base, Oklahoma, 1 July 1976 – present)

=== Aircraft ===
- Douglas B-18 Bolo (1942–1943)
- Consolidated B-24 Liberator (1943–1944)
- Stinson L-5 Sentinel (1944–1945) (1946–1949)
- Noorduyn C-64 Norseman (1944)
- Piper L-4 Grasshopper (1945)
- Beechcraft C-45 Expeditor (1946–1947)
- Sikorsky R-5 (later H-5) (1947–1949)
- Sikorsky R-6 (1947)
- Stinson L-13 (1948–1949)
- Lockheed RC-121 Constellation (1955–1959 & 1961–1963)
- Lockheed TC–121 (1959–1961 & 1972–1975)
- Lockheed EC-121 Warning Star (1963–1972)
- Lockheed C-121 Constellation (1969–1976)
- Boeing E-3 Sentry (1976–present)

B-18 Bolo	B-24 Liberator	L-5 Sentinel	UC–64 Norseman
B-18 Bolo (1942–1943)	B-24 Liberator (1943–1944)	L-5 Sentinel (1944–1945)	UC–64 Norseman (1944)
L–4 Grasshopper	C–45	R–5 Dragonfly	R-6 Hoverfly II
L–4 Grasshopper (1945)	C–45 Expeditor (1946–1947)	R–5 Dragonfly (1947–1949)	R-6 Hoverfly II (1947)
L–13 Grasshopper	RC-121	EC-121 Warning Star	E-3 Sentry
L–13 Grasshopper (1948–1949)	RC-121 (1955–1959 & 1961–1963)	EC-121 Warning Star (1963–1972)	E-3 Sentry (1976 – present)
