= 42nd Tactical Missile Squadron =

2d Search Attack Squadron (later 42d Tactical Missile Squadron)
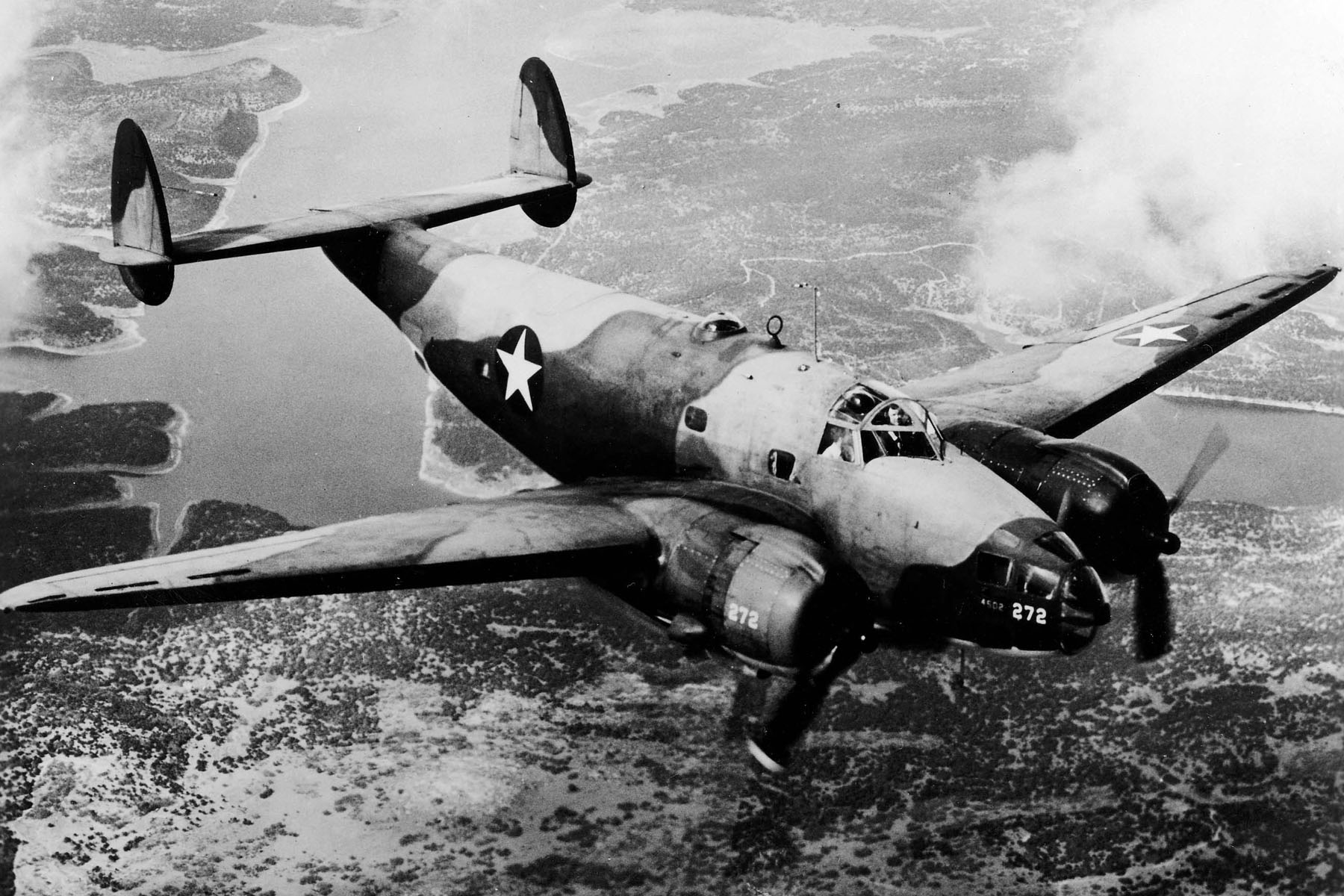
- B-34 Ventura as flown by the squadron
- Active: 1942-1944; 1953-1954
- Country: United States
- Branch: United States Air Force
- Role: Antisubmarine warfare testing
- Engagements: American Theater of World War II

Insignia
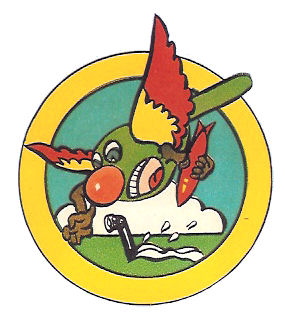
- 2d Search Attack Squadron emblem (approved 9 January 1943)

The 42d Tactical Missile Squadron is an inactive United States Air Force unit, formed in 1985 by the consolidation of two units. The first is the 2d Search Attack Squadron, which tested antisubmarine warfare tactics and equipment at Langley Field, Virginia during World War II. The second is the 942d Forward Air Control Squadron, which was activated following the Korean War, but does not appear to have been equipped or manned. The consolidated squadron has not been active.

== History ==
=== World War II ===
The first predecessor of the squadron was activated at Langley Field, Virginia as the 2d Search Attack Squadron. The squadron was primarily equipped with Douglas B-18 Bolos. It tested electronic equipment and trained crews for its use in antisubmarine operations; antisubmarine patrols, July 1942 until late 1943."

=== Cold War ===
The second predecessor of the squadron is the 942d Forward Air Control Squadron, which was activated as the Korean War was ending in June 1953. With the end of the war the following month, it apparently was not manned or equipped until it was inacrivated in March 1954.

The two squadrons were consolidated in September 1985 as the 42d Tactical Missile Squadron.

== Lineage ==
2d Search Attack Unit

- Constituted as the 2d Search Attack Squadron (Medium) on 8 June 1942

Activated on 17 June 1942
Redesignated 2d Sea-Search Attack Squadron (Heavy) on 24 June 1943
Redesignated 2d Search Attack Squadron (Heavy) on 22 November 1943
Disbanded on 10 April 1944
Reconstituted and consolidated with the 942d Forward Air Control Squadron as the 42d Tactical Missile Squadron on 19 September 1985

942d Forward Air Control Squadron

- Constituted as the 942d Forward Air Control Squadron on 18 March 1953

Activated 20 June 1953
Inactivated on 8 March 1954
Consolidated with the 2d Search Attack Squadron as the 42d Tactical Missile Squadron on 19 September 1985

=== Assignments ===
- 1st Sea-Search Attack Group (later 1st Sea-Search Attack Unit, 1st Search Attack Group), 17 June 1942 – 10 April 1944

Air echelon attached to I Bomber Command, 17-23 Apr 1942

=== Stations ===
- Langley Field, Virginia, 17 June 1942 – 10 April 1944 operated from: Naval Air Station Key West, Florida, 17–23 August 1942; Rdinburgh Field, Trinidad, 20 September-21 October 1942
- Chunchon Air Base, South Korea, 20 Jun 1953-8 Mar 1954

=== Aircraft ===
- North American B-25 Mitchell, 1942
- Douglas B-18 Bolo/ 1942–1943
- Lockheed B-34 Ventura, 1943–1944

== See also ==
- List of United States Air Force missile squadrons
