= 3d Search Attack Squadron =

- Active: 1942-1944
- Country: United States
- Branch: United States Air Force
- Role: Antisubmarine Warfare

The 3d Search Attack Squadron is an inactive United States Air Force unit. Its last assignment was with the 1st Search Attack Group, based at Langley Field, Virginia. It was inactivated on 10 April 1944.

== History ==
Tested electronic equipment and trained crews for its use in antisubmarine operations; antisubmarine patrols, Jan until late 1943.

=== Lineage ===
- Constituted 2d Search Attack Squadron (Heavy) on 7 December 1942

Activated on 10 December 1942
Redesignated: 2d Search Attack Squadron (Heavy) on 22 November 1943
Disbanded on 10 April 1944.

=== Assignments ===
- 1st Sea-Search Attack Unit (later Search Attack Group), 10 December 1942 – 10 April 1944.

=== Stations ===
- Langley Field, Virginia, 10 December 1942 – 10 April 1944

=== Aircraft ===
- B-18 Bolo, 1942–1943
- B-24 Liberator, 1943–1944
