= 365th Intelligence, Surveillance, and Reconnaissance Group =

365th Intelligence, Surveillance and Reconnaissance Group
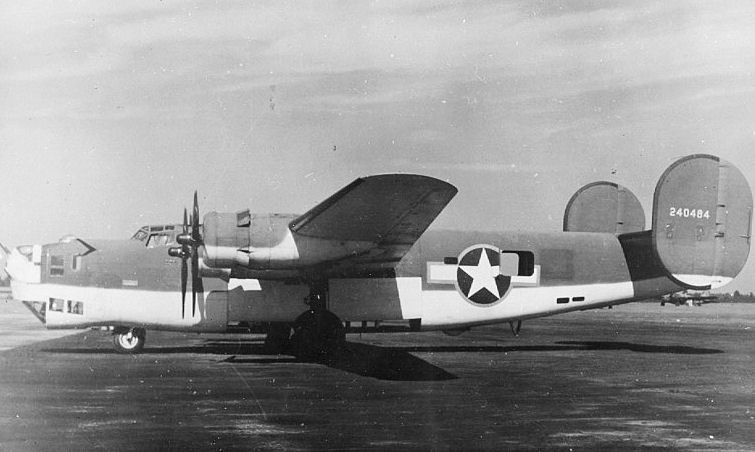
- A radar-equipped B-24D Liberator modified for antisubmarine use (Note: Aircraft is serial 42-40483. The retracted antenna for the radar is visible just aft of the open bomb bay doors in the place where the ventral gun turret would normally be installed.)
- Active: 1942–1944; 2015–present
- Country: United States
- Branch: United States Army Air Forces
- Role: Intelligence Support
- Part of: Air Combat Command
- Garrison/HQ: Nellis Air Force Base
- Nickname: The Search (1942-1944)

Commanders
- World War II Commander: Col W. C. Dolan

Insignia
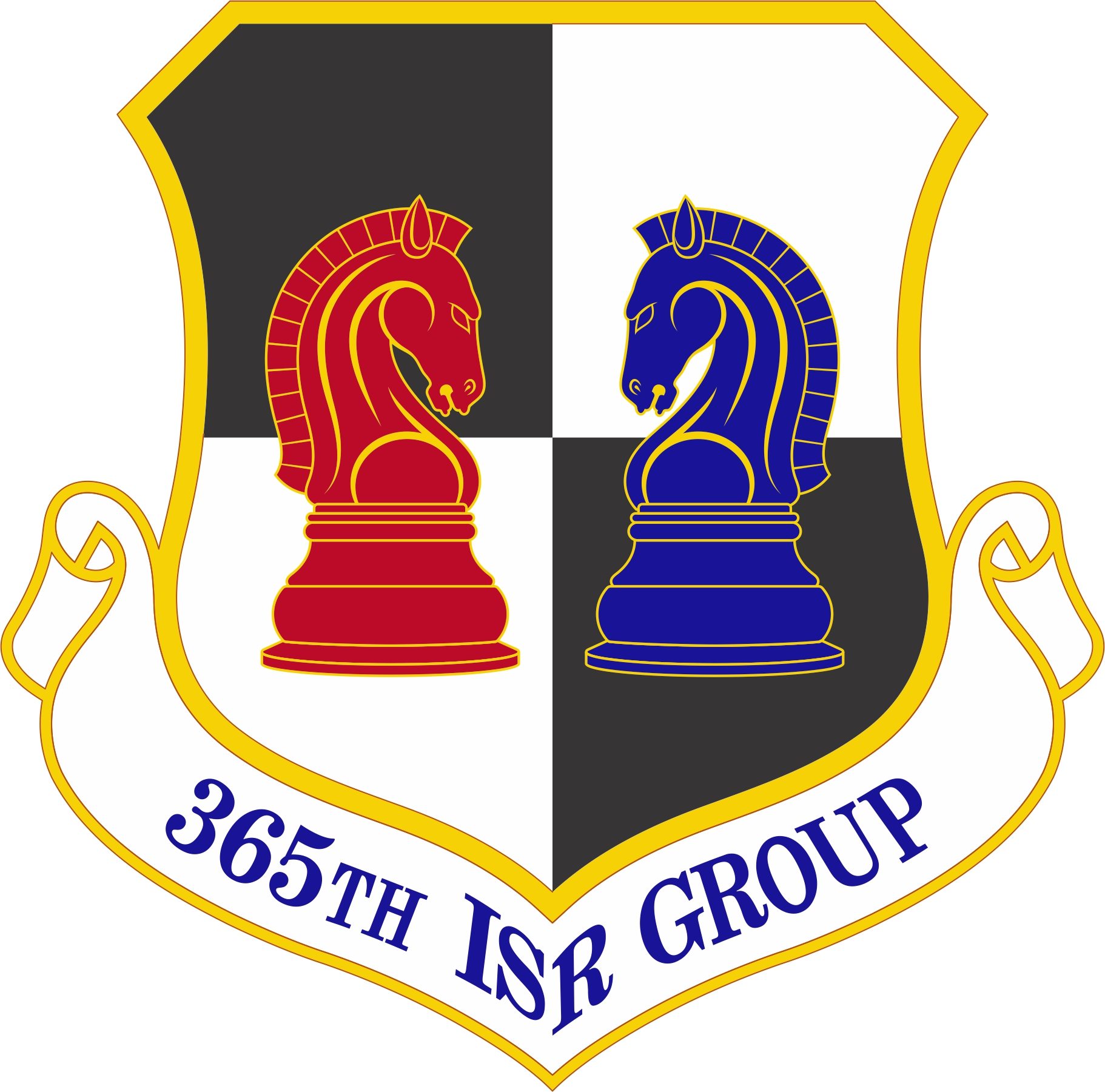
- 365th Intelligence, Surveillance and Reconnaissance Group emblem (approved 26 October 2015)

The 1st Search Attack Group was a United States Army Air Forces unit that served during World War II. Its last assignment was with First Air Force. It was based at Langley Field, Virginia throughout its existence, and equipped with Boeing B-17 Flying Fortress, Douglas B-18 Bolo, and Consolidated B-24 Liberator aircraft. It was disbanded on 20 April 1944.

The original mission of the group was the development of equipment and tactics best suited for aerial anti-submarine warfare. Among the devices that the group helped develop or test were the radar altimeter, (Note: The radar or absolute altimeter gives the altitude an aircraft is above the surface it is flying over, rather than the altitude above sea level given by the barometric altimeter.) the magnetic anomaly detector, the sonobuoy, improved airborne depth charges, long-range navigation systems, and airborne microwave radar.

The group also conducted training on equipment and antisubmarine tactics for Army Air Forces units and personnel. During the summer and fall of 1942, most of the unit's aircrews deployed to the Caribbean, where they conducted missions against German U-boats. After the Navy assumed responsibility for land based aerial antisubmarine operations in 1943, the unit continued to conduct radar training for bomber crews until it was disbanded.

The group was reconstituted in 1985 as the 365th Electronic Warfare Group, but was not active under that designation. It was redesignated the 365th Intelligence, Surveillance and Reconnaissance Group and activated at Nellis Air Force Base, Nevada, where it provides intelligence support for the Adversary Tactics Group and the United States Air Force Weapons School.

== Mission ==
The group provides analysis of intelligence from multiple sources to support airpower employment, focusing on threat tactics, characteristics, and capabilities. It performs threat support and high-end training to enable future Air Force employment, It supports Red Flag exercises at Nellis and supports the Adversary Tactics Group and the United States Air Force Weapons School.

== History ==
=== World War II ===
==== Organization ====
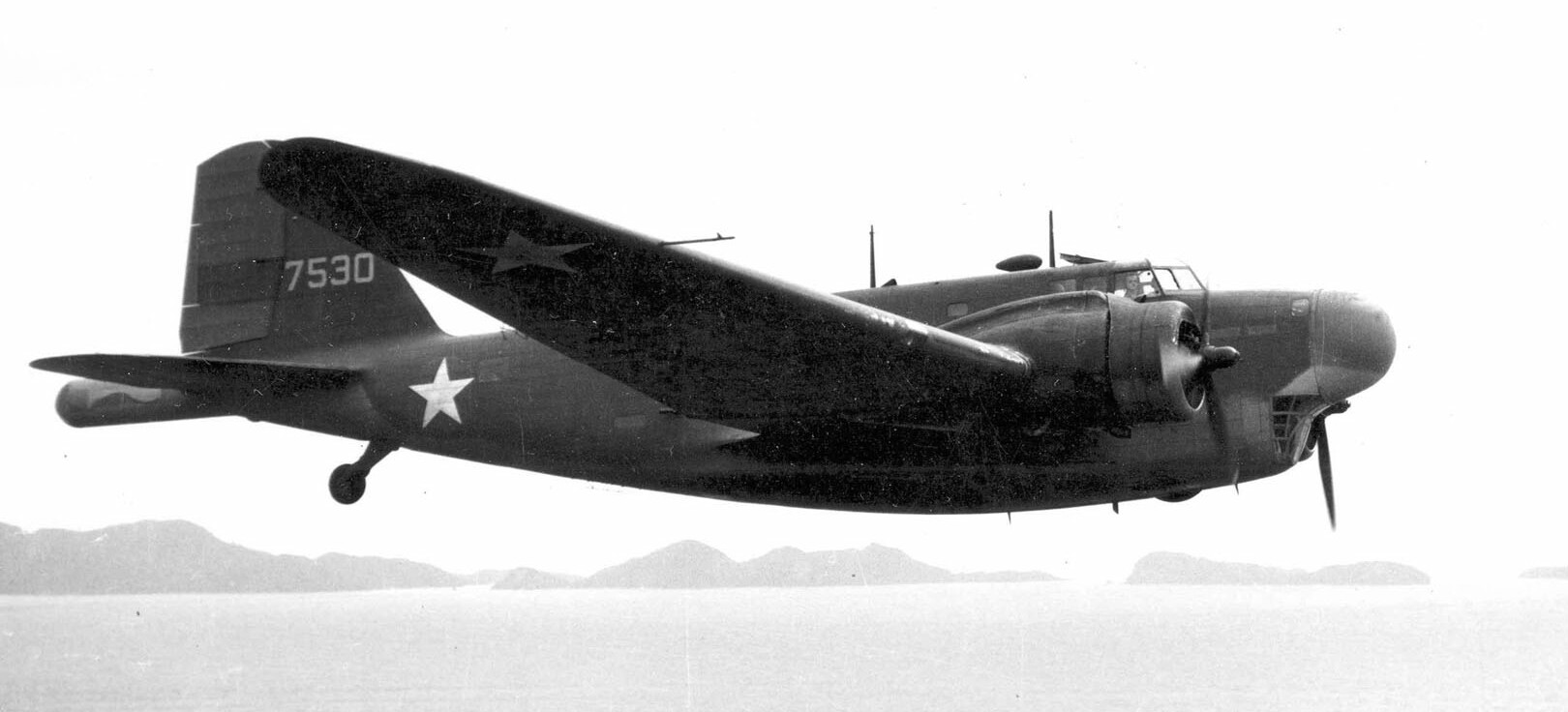
Antisubmarine B-18B with a MAD tail boom (Note: Aircraft is Douglas B-18B serial 37-530. Originally built as a B-18A.)

The unit was first organized as the 1st Sea-Search Attack Group (Medium) at Langley Field, Virginia six months after the United States entered World War II on 17 June 1942 and assigned directly to Headquarters, Army Air Forces. Its mission was to test equipment and develop techniques and tactics for aerial use against submarines and surface vessels. In addition to its test mission, the group also flew antisubmarine patrols. The group was initially assigned a single squadron, the 2d Sea-Search Attack Squadron (Medium). (Note: There was apparently never a 1st Sea-Search Attack Squadron. See Maurer, Combat Squadrons, p. 808 (index of World War II combat squadrons numbered 1).)

The group and squadron were formed from a cadre of crews who had received training on Air to Surface Vessel (ASV) radars from scientists at Massachusetts Institute of Technology's Radiation Laboratory, which had installed radars in their Douglas B-18 Bolo aircraft. Although the original intention was to return the planes and crews to their original units, Lt Col W. C. Dolan, the senior officer among the trainees and commander of the 20th Bombardment Squadron, urged that they be combined into a single specialized unit. Col Dolan's suggestion was accepted, and following testing of the ASV radars with the Navy near New London, Connecticut, the crews moved to Langley, where they were initially attached to the 20th Squadron. Once the group and its squadron were formed the crews and planes were transferred to it and Col Dolan assumed command.

The first ASV-10 radar sets were placed on B-18s, and 90 Bolos were modified with the radars by the end of June 1942. However, B-24 Liberator had a much longer range than the B-18. Equipped with auxiliary fuel tanks, radar and a powerful searchlight, the B-24 was ideal for extended antisubmarine patrols. The USAAF outfitted its first two microwave radar equipped B-24s in September 1942. In December 1942, the 1st Group added a second squadron, the 3d Sea-Search Attack Squadron (Heavy). Although initially equipped with B-18s, the squadron was organized as the unit to which the group's heavy B-24 Liberators would be assigned.

World War II era radar sets, particularly the newly operational ones the group tested in its bombers, were difficult to maintain, and scientists assigned to the group for testing found that instead, much of their time was consumed by maintenance of the unit's radar equipment. Deployments during the late summer and early fall of 1942 also demonstrated that large amounts of a variety of components and trained radar maintenance men, in addition to the radar operator on the plane crew, were needed to keep the radars in service. As a result, the Army Air Forces expanded the 1st to establish a school within the group to train ground personnel in maintenance of radar equipment.

1943 saw several changes to the group's name. Recognizing that the B-18s that had formed the unit's original equipment were being replaced by longer range four-engine airplanes, the (Medium) in the group's name was replaced by (Heavy) in June. The group's final expansion occurred in October 1943, when the 18th Antisubmarine Squadron, which had been part of the 25th Antisubmarine Wing and equipped with Boeing B-17 Flying Fortresses, was assigned to the group as the 4th Sea-Search Attack Squadron (Heavy). The 18th had been acting as the 25th Wing's replacement training unit and was a good fit for the group's expanding training mission. In November, recognizing that the Navy had absorbed the portion of the antisubmarine mission that the Army Air Forces had been performing and the concentration of the unit mission on radar training, rather than antisubmarine work, the "Sea" was dropped from the name and it became the 1st Search Attack Group.

However, the Army Air Forces found that standard military units, based on relatively inflexible tables of organization, were proving less well adapted to training and other support missions. Accordingly, it adopted a more functional system in which each of its bases was organized into a separate numbered unit, while the groups and squadrons on the base were disbanded or inactivated. This resulted in the 1st, along with other units at Langley, being disbanded in April 1944, and being replaced by the 111th AAF Base Unit (Search Attack and Staging), which assumed the group's mission, personnel, and equipment. The 111th continued the group's mission until September 1944, when it was discontinued.

==== Testing ====
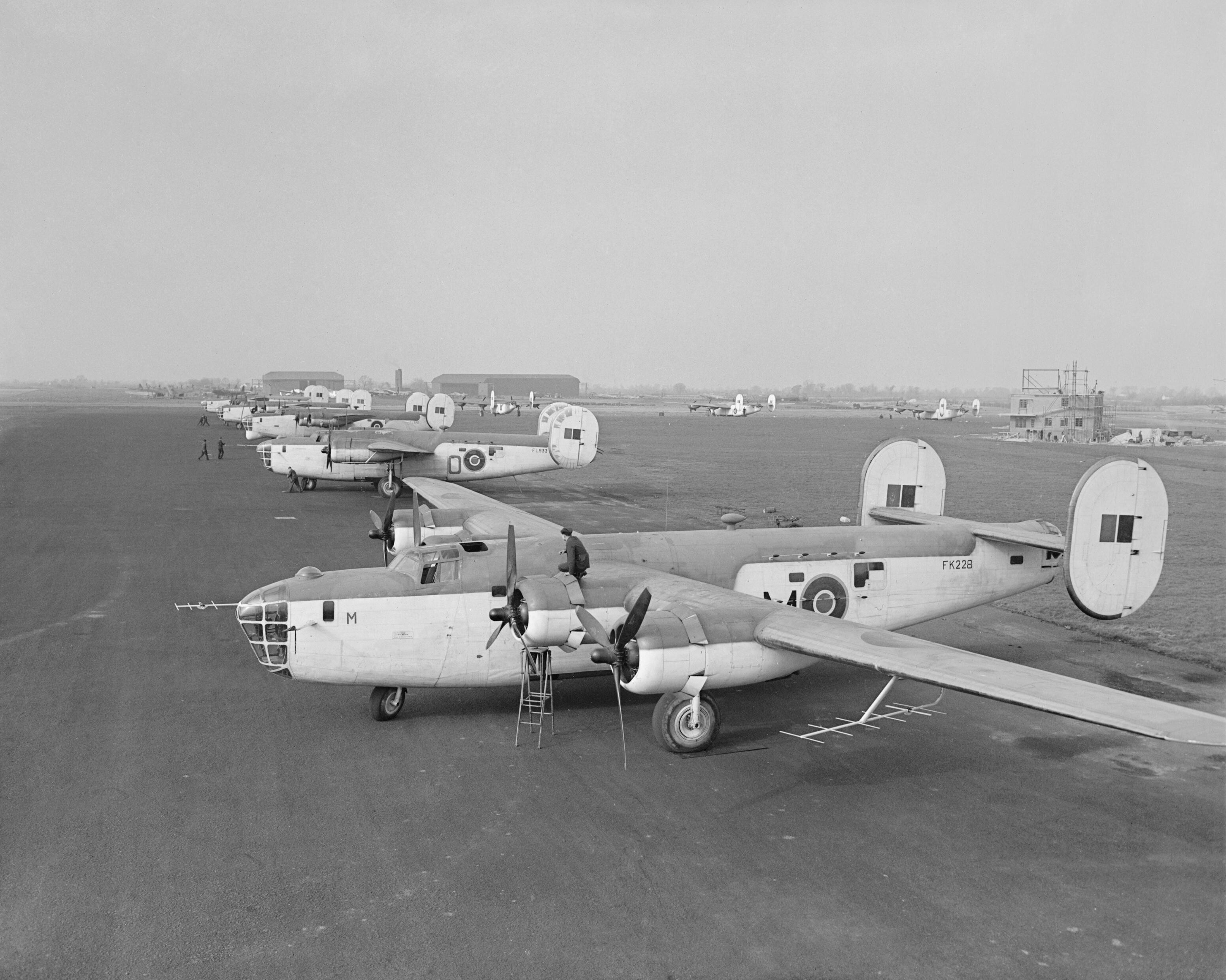
RAF Liberators equipped with ASV radar

The group antisubmarine warfare testing mission relied on cooperation with and assistance from the Navy. The group's location at Langley also gave it access to the research and test facilities of the National Advisory Committee on Aeronautics. In addition, early on the group received two Royal Air Force (RAF) aircraft already equipped with ASV radar, Consolidated LB-30 Liberators, the export version of the B-24, along with one RAF crew with experience in antisubmarine warfare. In August 1942, the group air echelon was temporarily diverted from testing when it deployed, first to Key West Naval Air Station, then to Waller Field on Trinidad to fly antisubmarine missions in the Caribbean. The first crews returned to Langley in September and operations were continued from Trinidad until 16 October.

===== Equipment =====
One important device tested by the group was the magnetic anomaly detector (MAD). MAD could sense changes in the Earth's magnetic field, as could be produced by a submarine's steel hull. Aircraft outfitted with this device would patrol in an area where a submarine had been spotted but had submerged. Combined with the use of sonobuoys to listen for the sounds of a submarine, MAD provided a high probability of conducting a successful attack. The group conducted its first operation using MAD on 13 July 1942 and located a submarine which had been damaged in a previous attack.

The group also helped develop the radar altimeter, or absolute altimeter. This device used a microwave radar to determine an aircraft's exact altitude above the surface within ten feet. This altimeter permitted antisubmarine aircraft to fly safely as low as 50 feet above the surface. Low altitude attacks substantially improved the chances of destroying the target submarine. This device became standard equipment on Army Air Forces antisubmarine aircraft by 1943.

Another important development assisted by the group was LORAN. (Note: An acronym from long range [aid to] navigation.) LORAN transmitters, located at known points allowed an antisubmarine aircraft to receive signals from three stations, allowing the aircraft to pinpoint its location to within four miles as far as 1,500 miles from the transmitters. LORAN permitted efficient control of converging air and surface forces for a coordinated attack.

The 1st also helped develop an effective depth bomb fuses that could be set for as little as about 25 feet. Eventually, the Americans and British developed a depth bomb that sank slowly and exploded at the desired depth to destroy the target submarine. By 1943, this weapon had become the standard for aircraft attacks on submarines.

===== Tactics =====
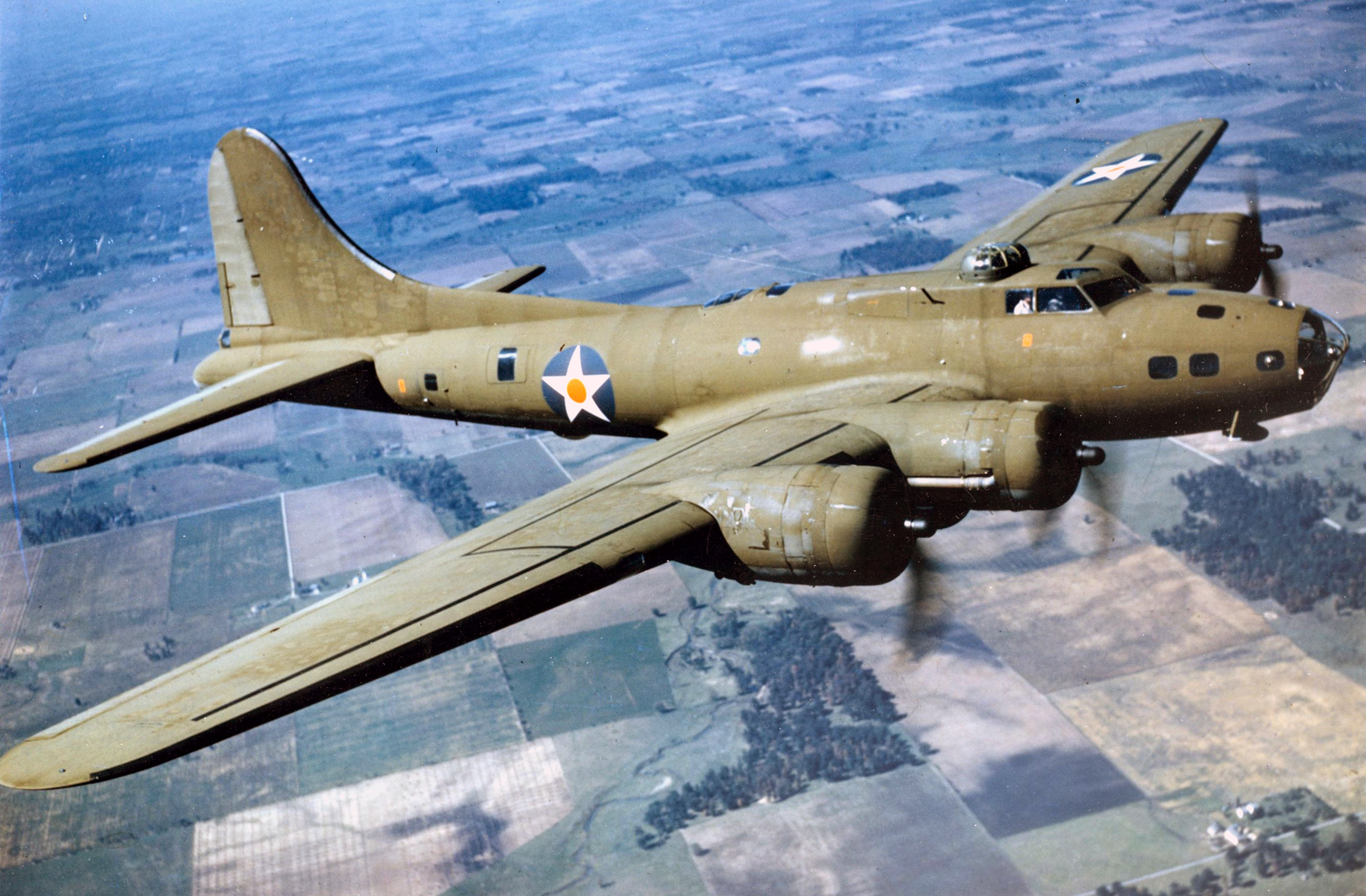
B-17E as flown by the group

Another task of the 1st Sea Search Attack Group was to develop techniques for using ASV radar to find surfaced submarines. By February 1943, a skilled radar operator could identify surfaced submarines at more than 40 miles (64 km) and even the conning tower of a boat running decks awash at 15 to 30 miles (24 to 48 km). In May 1943, the group conducted an exercise from Key West to demonstrate and evaluate the tactics it had developed.

Using its B-18s and B-24s, the 1st Group trained combat crews in the tactics to employ the equipment it had tested. Tactic included routine aerial patrol of waters in which an enemy threat might exist, air escort of convoys and intensive patrol of an area in which submarines had been spotted. The Army Air Forces termed this third operation a "killer hunt." At various times, each of these tactics had a place in the antisubmarine war. As 1943 progressed, the training mission began to predominate over the testing mission, and included training with H2X radars, which were used primarily for high altitude bombing rather than antisubmarine warfare.

On 9 July 1943, the Army Air Forces agreed to the transfer of its antisubmarine mission to the Navy's Tenth Fleet. (Note: Two antisubmarine groups located overseas continued to operate for several months. Warnock, p. 26) The 1st Group became concerned primarily with radar training for combat crews until disbanding in April 1944. As a training unit, assignment directly to Headquarters, Army Air Forces was no longer a requirement and the group became part of First Air Force. The three squadrons conducted specialized training, the 2d in low altitude bombing, the 3d in H2X radar operations with the B-24, and the 4th in H2X installed in B-17s.

=== Reactivation as an intelligence unit ===
In 1985, as part of a project by the United States Air Force to revive disbanded World War II units, the group was reconstituted as the 365th Electronic Warfare Group, but the group was not reactivated until February 2015 as the 365th Intelligence, Surveillance and Reconnaissance Group at Nellis Air Force Base, Nevada. It added intelligence units at two other bases in 2016.

== Lineage ==
- Constituted as the 1st Sea-Search Attack Group (Medium) on 8 June 1942

Activated on 17 June 1942
Redesignated as 1st Sea-Search Attack Group (Heavy) on 24 June 1943
Redesignated as 1st Sea-Search Attack Unit c. 17 September 1943
Redesignated as 1st Search Attack Group on 29 November 1943
Disbanded on 20 April 1944

- Reconstituted on 31 March 1985 and redesignated 365th Electronic Warfare Group
- Redesignated 365th Intelligence, Surveillance and Reconnaissance Group 13 February 2015

Actovated on 17 February 2015

=== Assignments ===
- Headquarters, United States Army Air Forces, 17 June 1942 (Attached to I Bomber Command, (Note: The two I Bomber Commands to which the group was attached were different commands. The first became XX Bomber Command and trained very heavy bombardment units, and its place in First Air Force was later taken by the former Antisubmarine Command. Maurer, Combat Units, pp. 437, 452.) until 15 October 1942, then to Army Air Forces Antisubmarine Command (later I Bomber Command))
- First Air Force, 10 November 1943 – 20 April 1944
- 363d Intelligence, Surveillance and Reconnaissance Wing, 17 February 2015 – present

=== Stations ===
- :Langley Field, 17 June 1942 – 20 April 1944
- Nellis Air Force Base, 17 February 2015 – present

=== Components ===
- 2d Sea-Search Attack Squadron (later 2d Search Attack Squadron): 17 June 1942 – 10 April 1944
- 3d Sea-Search Attack Squadron (later 3d Search Attack Squadron): 10 December 1942 – 10 April 1944
- 4th Sea-Search Attack Squadron (later 4th Search Attack Squadron): 23 October 1943 – 10 April 1944
- 15th Intelligence Squadron, 15 February 2015 – 12 Feb 2021
- 51st Intelligence Squadron, unknown – present

Shaw Air Force Base, South Carolina

- 57th Intelligence Squadron, 17 February 2015 – present

Joint Base San Antonio (Lackland Air Force Base)

- 526th Intelligence Squadron, 15 February 2015 – present
- 547th Intelligence Squadron, 15 February 2015 – present

Subordinate to the 363rd ISR Wing at Joint Base Langley-Eustis, Virginia, the 365 ISR Group oversees operations of the 15th Intelligence Squadron at Joint Base Langley-Eustis, the

=== Aircraft ===
- Douglas B-18 Bolo, 1942–1943
- Boeing B-17 Flying Fortress, 1943–1944
- Consolidated B-24 Liberator (including LB-30), 1942–1944
- North American B-25 Mitchell, 1942

=== Campaign ===
Campaign Streamer	Campaign	Dates	Notes
	Antisubmarine	17 June 1942 – 1 August 1943	

== See also ==
- B-17 Flying Fortress units of the United States Army Air Forces
- B-24 Liberator units of the United States Army Air Forces
