= Mitsubishi G3M =

WWII-era medium bomber

G3M
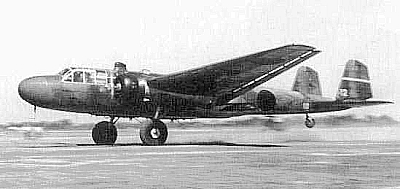

General information
- Type: Medium bomber/torpedo bomber
- Manufacturer: Mitsubishi
- Primary user: Imperial Japanese Navy Air Service
- Number built: 1,048

History
- Introduction date: 1935
- First flight: July 1935
- Retired: 1945
- Variant: Mitsubishi G4M

The Mitsubishi G3M (九六式陸上攻撃機, Kyūroku-shiki rikujō kōgeki-ki; as Type 96 land-based attack aircraft "Rikko"; Allied reporting name "Nell") was a Japanese bomber and transport aircraft used by the Imperial Japanese Navy Air Service (IJNAS) during World War II.

The Yokosuka L3Y (Allied reporting name "Tina"), was a transport variant of the aircraft manufactured by the Yokosuka Naval Air Technical Arsenal.

The G3M bomber saw extensive use in the Pacific War. Attacks by G3M and G4M bombers resulted in the sinking of the Royal Navy battleship HMS Prince of Wales and battlecruiser HMS Repulse, the first time capital ships actively defending themselves were sunk solely by air power while in the open sea. G4Ms and G3Ms also sunk the heavy cruiser USS Chicago in an air attack during the Battle of Rennell Island. In order to maintain the speed and high-altitude performance of the G3M with a heavy payload, it lacked any form of defensive armour or self-sealing fuel tanks. This trait was maintained in the G3M's successor the G4M. The vulnerability of these bombers to fighters and surface gunfire earned them the unofficial nickname of "one shot lighter" or "the flying lighter" by Allied fighter pilots.

== Design and development ==
The G3M has its origins in a specification submitted to the Mitsubishi company from the Imperial Japanese Navy requesting a bomber aircraft with a range unprecedented at the time. This principally stemmed from Admiral Isoroku Yamamoto's influence in the Naval High Commission. The bomber was to have the capacity to accommodate an aerial torpedo capable of sinking an armoured battleship. The speed requirement submitted by the naval department was again also unprecedented, not only in Japanese but also in international bomber aviation, where in relation to the envisaged Japanese battlegrounds of China and the Pacific, the bomber would need to not only cover long distances, but necessarily have exceptional speed to strike distant targets with a minimum attack time. Thus the G3M was an embodiment of Japanese military aircraft design in the brief period leading to the Pacific War, with powerful offensive armament (in this case in the form of bombs and torpedoes) and range and speed emphasised over protection and defensive capabilities.

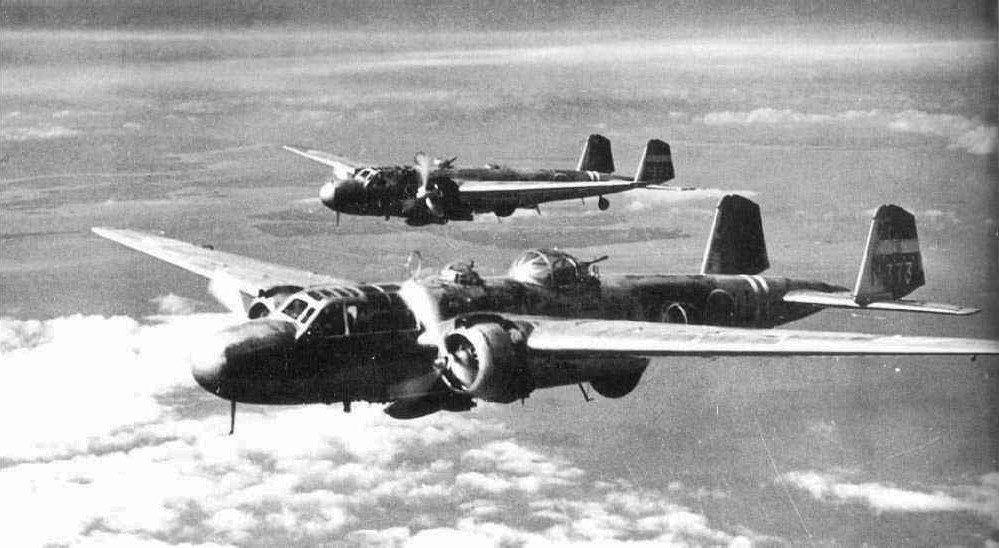
Two G3M2 bombers - the nearest Model 22 and the other a Model 21

The G3M was originally designed without any form of defensive weaponry, with its high-altitude performance being regarded as sufficient to evade enemy anti-aircraft guns and its high speed in combination with the planned high performance Mitsubishi A5M fighter envisaged as an armed escort considered sufficient to counter any enemy fighters. Even in the low-speed, low-level role of torpedo bomber, the superior fighter escort – combined with the G3M's high speed – was considered sufficient against any form of ship-based AA guns or carrier-based fighters.

The lightweight structure and complete lack of defensive machine guns and the additional crew necessary to operate them (features in the early prototype design) were considered essential to maintain the speed and high-altitude performance of the G3M with a heavy payload. Even after the modified final prototype, which did include three defensive machine gun emplacements, the G3M kept its lightweight structure and lacked any form of defensive armour or self-sealing fuel tanks, as these were considered to retard speed and altitude. This trait in Japanese bomber and fighter design manifested itself again in its successor, the Mitsubishi G4M, whose design so strongly emphasized fuel and bomb load for long-range strikes at the expense of defence that its vulnerability to fighters and ground and surface gunfire earned it the unofficial nickname of "one shot lighter" by Allied fighter pilots.

The bombsight used in the G3M was primitive compared to the mechanisms used in the G3M's contemporaries such as the B-17 Flying Fortress and Heinkel He 111. Aside from the limited precision necessary in its naval role as a long-range torpedo bomber against Allied naval fleets, the G3M frequently operated with other G3M units in massive "wave" formation. Use of these large formations eliminated the need for singular high-precision bombing attacks.

Later the Nakajima Company redesigned the G3M into the improved G3M3 (Model 23) with more powerful engines and increased fuel capacity. This version was manufactured only by Nakajima, being the most rapidly produced in wartime. This version entered service in 1941, and was maintained in service for two years, and later used in 1943 alongside the G3M2 for long-range maritime reconnaissance with radar, due to its excellent long-range performance. Other G3M derivations were the transport versions, G3M-L and L3Y, the latter built by Yokosuka.

== Operational history ==
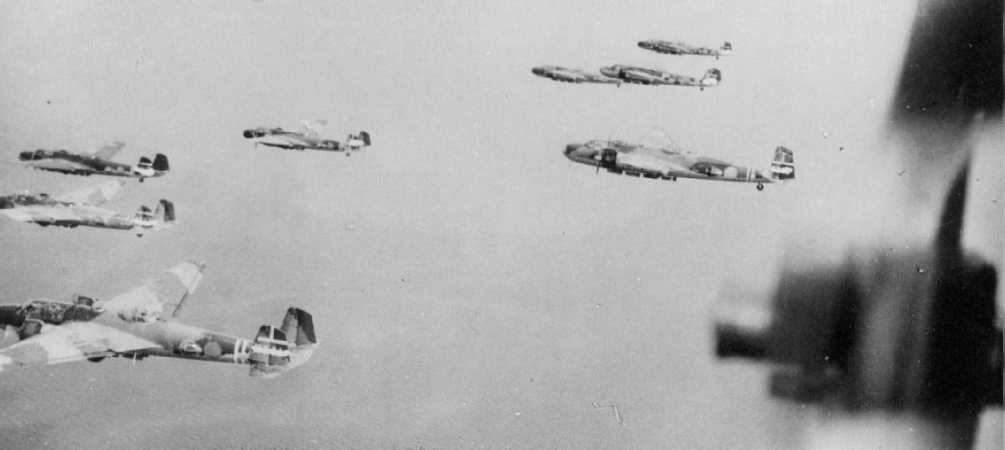
A formation of G3Ms

The G3M flew for the first time in 1935, taking off from a Nagasaki airfield belonging to Mitsubishi Heavy Industries and landing at Haneda Airport on the outskirts of Tokyo. The G3M first saw combat in Japan's expansionist campaigns in China in what became known as the "Second Sino-Japanese War", where the G3M was able to exploit its long-range capability when, during August–November 1937, the 1. Rengo Kōkūtai (a special unit) was established, operating alongside the Kanoya and Kizarazu Kōkūtai based in Taipei, Formosa, Omura, Kyūshū and Jeju Island. On 14 August of that same year, 42 G3Ms and seven Hiro G2H1s, escorted by 12 Nakajima A4Ns and 12 Mitsubishi A5Ms of the 2. Rengo Kōkūtai (a unit consisting of the 12th and 13th kōkūtai), departed from their bases to cross the East China Sea for the bombing of Hangzhou and Kwanteh, and performed, amongst other actions, terror bombing of coastal and inland targets in China, including bombing during the Battle of Shanghai and Nanjing. The attacking G3M bombers and escorting fighters were often engaged by Curtiss Hawk III and Boeing P-26/281 fighters of the Chinese Air Force early on in the war. Later, from bases in occupied Chinese territories, it took part in the strategic carpet bombing of the Chinese heartland, its combat range being sufficient for the great distances involved. Most notably, it was involved in the round-the-clock bombing of Chongqing.

When the Pacific War erupted with the invasion of Malaya and bombing of Pearl Harbor in December 1941, the G3M was by this time considered to be antiquated, but still three front-line units (the 22nd to 24th koku sentai) were operating a total of 204 G3M2s in four kōkūtai (naval air corps) in the central Pacific and of these 54 aircraft from the Takao Kōkūtai were deployed from Formosa in the opening of the Battle of the Philippines. On 8 December 1941, (7 December across the International Date Line), G3Ms from the Mihoro Kōkūtai struck Singapore from bases in occupied French Indochina as one of many air raids during the Battle of Singapore, resulting in thousands of British and Asian civilians dead. Wake Island was similarly bombed by G3Ms from the Chitose Kōkūtai on the first day of the war, with both civilian and US Navy infrastructure being heavily damaged on the ground. Other G3Ms of Chitose Kōkūtai, based in Kwajalein Atoll, attacked US Navy and civilian installations on Howland Island in the same period.

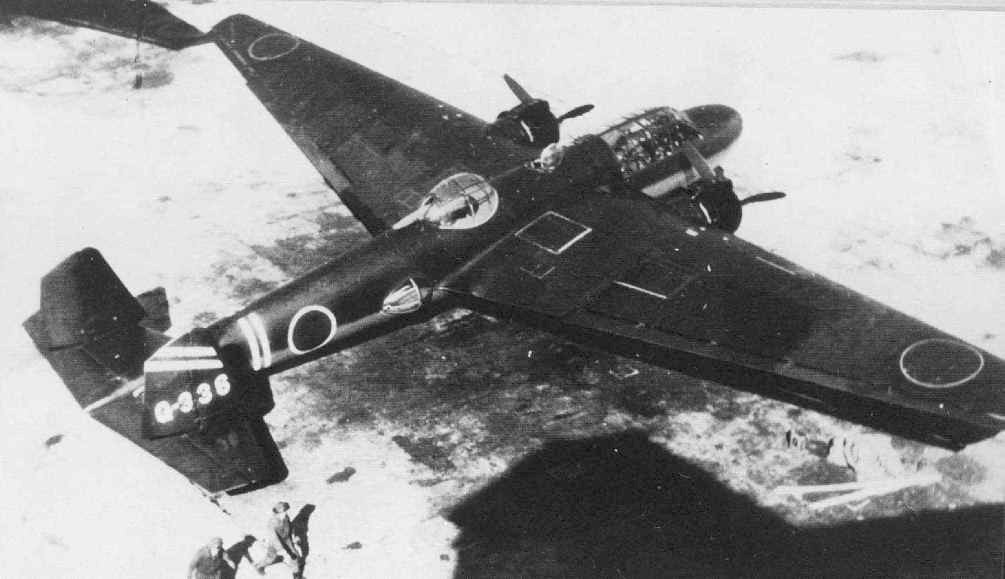
A G3M from the Genzan Kōkūtai as can be seen from the code on the tail.

The G3M was famous for taking part, along with the more advanced Mitsubishi G4M "Betty", in the sinking of two British capital ships on 10 December 1941. Nells from the Genzan Kōkūtai provided important support during the attack on HMS Prince of Wales and Repulse (Force Z) near the Malayan coast. Prince of Wales and Repulse were the first two capital ships ever sunk exclusively by an air attack while at sea during war.

The attack on Darwin, Australia on 19 February 1942, by 188 Japanese aircraft, included 27 G3Ms of the 1. Kōkūtai (1st Air Group) based at Ambon in the Dutch East Indies. G3Ms attacked alongside 27 Mitsubishi G4M "Betty" bombers. These bombers followed an 81-strong first wave of Mitsubishi A6M Zero fighters, Aichi D3A dive bombers, and Nakajima B5N torpedo bombers.

G3Ms of the 701 Air Group put two torpedoes into the heavy cruiser USS Chicago on January 29, 1943 during the Battle of Rennell Island, paving the way for her sinking by further torpedoes dropped by G4M bombers the next day.

From 1943 until the end of the war, the majority of G3Ms served as glider tugs, aircrew and paratroop trainers, and transports for high-ranking officers and VIPs between the home islands, occupied territories, and combat fronts.

== Variants ==
Ka-15
Prototype with either Hiro Type 91 (559 kW/750 hp), Mitsubishi Kinsei 2 (619 kW/830 hp), or Mitsubishi Kinsei 3 (679 kW/910 hp) engines and glass or solid nose. 21 built.
G3M1a/c
Redesignated prototypes powered by Hiro Type 91 or Mitsubishi Kinsei engines, glass nose.
G3M1 Model 11
Land-based attack bomber navy Type 96 first series model. Major extension of the cabin with a revised cover, some with fixed-pitch propeller. 34 built.
G3M1-L
G3M1 converted into an armed or unarmed military transport version and powered by Mitsubishi Kinsei 45 (802 kW/1,075 hp) engines.
G3M2 Model 21
More powerful engines and increased fuel capacity, dorsal turret; 343 constructed by Mitsubishi, 412 G3M2 and G3M3 manufactured by Nakajima.
Around two dozen G3M2 Model 21 bombers converted for use by civil operators such as Nippon Koku K.K.
G3M2 Model 22
Upper and belly turrets substituted for one upper turret, glass side positions. 238 built.
G3M3 Model 23
More powerful engines and increased fuel capacity for longer range, constructed by Nakajima.
L3Y1 Model 11
Transport navy Type 96, advanced conversion of G3M1 armed transport, built by Yokosuka.
L3Y2 Model 12
Transport navy Type 96, advanced conversion of G3M2 with Mitsubishi Kinsei engines, built by Yokosuka.
Nippon
One of the twin engined transports converted to carry out a round the world flight in 1939 on behalf of the Mainichi Shimbun newspaper.

== Operators ==
Japan

- Imperial Japanese Navy Air Service

=== Postwar ===
Indonesia

- Indonesian Air Force

China

- People's Liberation Army Air Force

== Specifications (Mitsubishi G3M2 Model 21) ==
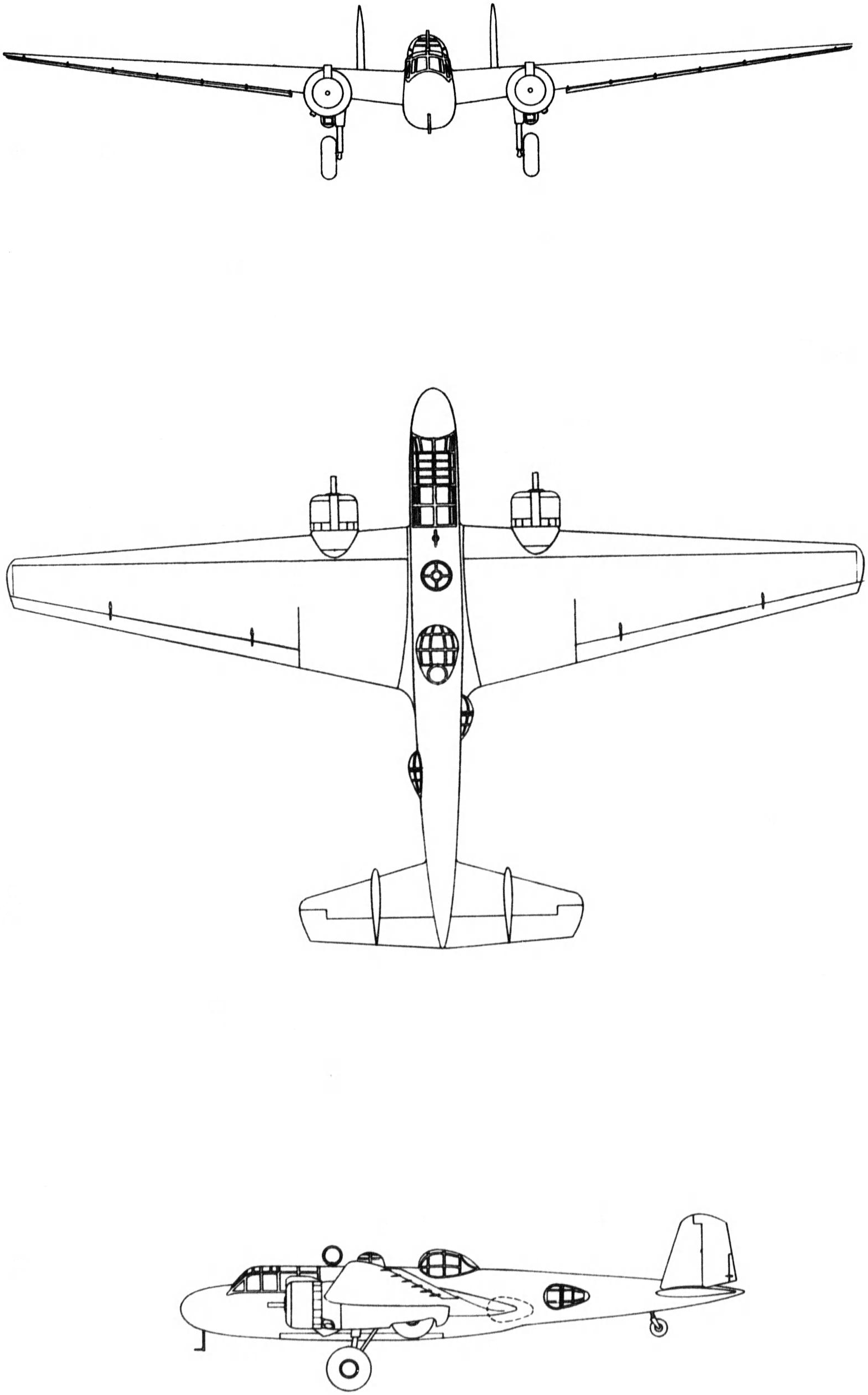
3-view drawing of the Mitsubishi G3M

Data from The Mitsubishi G3M "Nell"; Imperial Japanese Navy Bombers of World War Two;

General characteristics

- Crew: 7
- Length: 16.45 m (54 ft 0 in)
- Wingspan: 25 m (82 ft 0 in)
- Height: 3.68 m (12 ft 1 in)
- Wing area: 75 m^{2} (810 sq ft)
- Empty weight: 4,965 kg (10,946 lb)
- Gross weight: 8,000 kg (17,637 lb)
- Fuel capacity: 3,874 L (852.2 imp gal; 1,023.4 US gal)
- Powerplant: 2 × Mitsubishi Kinsei 14-cyl. air-cooled radial piston engines, 791 kW (1,061 hp) each

Performance

- Maximum speed: 375 km/h (233 mph, 202 kn)
- Cruise speed: 280 km/h (170 mph, 150 kn)
- Range: 4,400 km (2,700 mi, 2,400 nmi)
- Service ceiling: 9,200 m (30,200 ft)
- Rate of climb: 6 m/s (1,200 ft/min)

Armament

- Guns:
  - 1 × 20 mm (0.79 in) Type 99 cannon in rear dorsal turret
  - 4 × 7.7 mm (0.30 in) Type 92 machine gun in cockpit, left and right side positions, and in retractable forward dorsal turret.
- Bombs: 800 kg (1,800 lb) of bombs or one aerial torpedo

== See also ==
Related development

- Mitsubishi G4M

Aircraft of comparable role, configuration, and era

- Armstrong Whitworth Whitley
- Bristol Beaufort
- Bloch MB.131
- Dornier Do 17
- Douglas B-18 Bolo
- Fiat BR.20 Cicogna
- Heinkel He 111
- Junkers Ju 86
- PZL.37 Łoś
- Tupolev SB

Related lists

- List of aircraft of World War II

== Bibliography ==
- Bridgwater, H.C. and Scott, Peter. Combat Colours Number 4: Pearl Harbor and Beyond, December 1941 to May 1942. Luton, Bedfordshire: Guideline Publications, 2001. ISBN 0-9539040-6-7.
- Bueschel, Richard M. (1972). Mitsubishi/Nakajima G3M1/2/3, Kusho L3Y1/2 in Japanese Naval Air Service. Canterbury: Osprey. ISBN 0-85045-136-1.
- Ferkl, Martin (2002). Mitsubishi G4M Betty. Revi Publications. ISBN 8085957094.
- Francillon, René J. (1967). The Mitsubishi G3M "Nell". Aircraft in Profile No. 160. Leatherhead: Profile. OCLC 837728923.
- Francillon, René J. (1969). Imperial Japanese Navy Bombers of World War Two. Windsor: Hylton Lacy. ISBN 0-85064-022-9.
- Francillon, René J. (1979). Japanese Aircraft of the Pacific War. London: Putnam. ISBN 978-0-370-30251-5.
- Horodyski, Joseph M. "British Gamble In Asian Waters". Military Heritage, December 2001. Volume 3, No. 3: 68–77 (sinking of the British battleship Prince of Wales and battlecruiser Repulse by Japanese on 10 December 1941 upon U.S. entry into World War II).
- Murphy, Justin D.; McNiece, Mathew A. (1979). Military Aircraft, 1919–1945: An Illustrated History of Their Impact. London: Putnam & Company Limited. ISBN 1851094989.
- Shores, Christopher with Brian Cull and Yasuho Izawa. Bloody Shambles: The Drift to War to the Fall of Singapore volume I. London: Grub Street Publishing, 2002. ISBN 978-0-948817-50-2.
- Taylor, Michael John Haddrick; Taylor, John William Ransom (1978). Encyclopedia of Aircraft. London: Putnam. ISBN 978-0-29-777526-3.
- Thorpe, Donald W. Japanese Naval Air Force Camouflage and Markings World War II. Fallbrook, California; Aero Publishers Inc., 1977. ISBN 0-8168-6587-6
