= Douglas B-18 Bolo =

American twin-engined medium bomber aircraft in service 1936-1946

B-18 Bolo
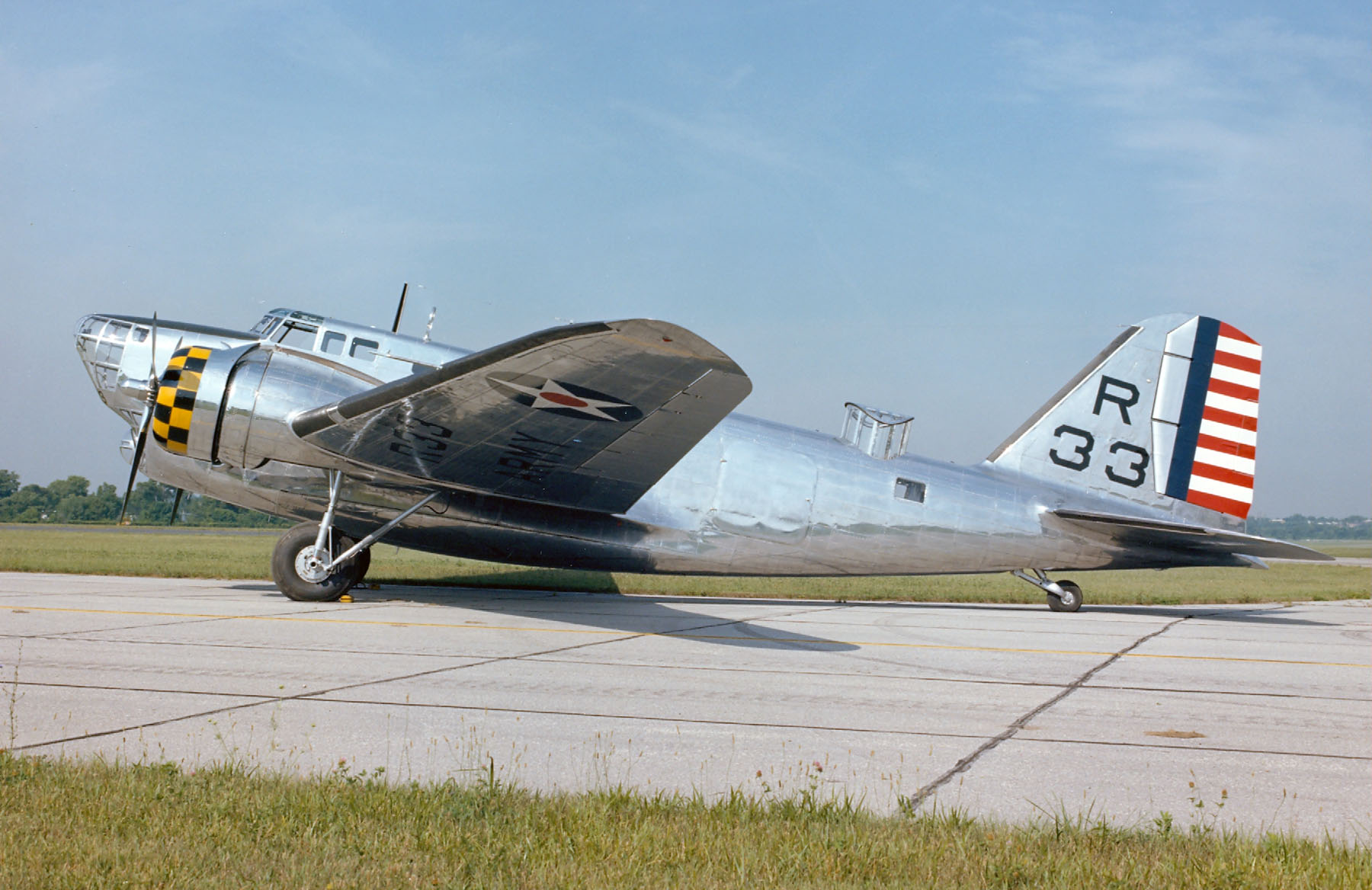

General information
- Type: Medium bomber
- Manufacturer: Douglas Aircraft Company
- Status: Retired
- Primary users: United States Army Air Corps United States Army Air Forces; Royal Canadian Air Force; Brazilian Air Force
- Number built: 350

History
- Manufactured: 1936– ca. 1939
- Introduction date: 1936
- First flight: April 1935
- Retired: 1946 from Brazilian Air Force
- Developed from: Douglas DC-2
- Developed into: Douglas B-23 Dragon

The Douglas B-18 Bolo is an American twin-engined medium bomber which served with the United States Army Air Corps and the Royal Canadian Air Force (as the Digby) during the late 1930s and early 1940s. The Bolo was developed by the Douglas Aircraft Company from their DC-2 as a replacement for the Martin B-10.

By 1940 standards, it was slow, had an inadequate defensive armament, and carried too small a bomb load. By 1942, surviving B-18s were relegated to antisubmarine, training and transport duties. A B-18 was one of the first USAAF aircraft to sink a German U-boat, U-654 on 22 August 1942 in the Caribbean.

== Design and development ==
In 1934, the United States Army Air Corps requested a twin-engine bomber with double the bomb load and range of the Martin B-10 then entering service. During the evaluation at Wright Field the following year, Douglas offered its DB-1. It was competing against the Boeing Model 299 (later developed into the Boeing B-17 Flying Fortress), the North American XB-21, and Martin 146.

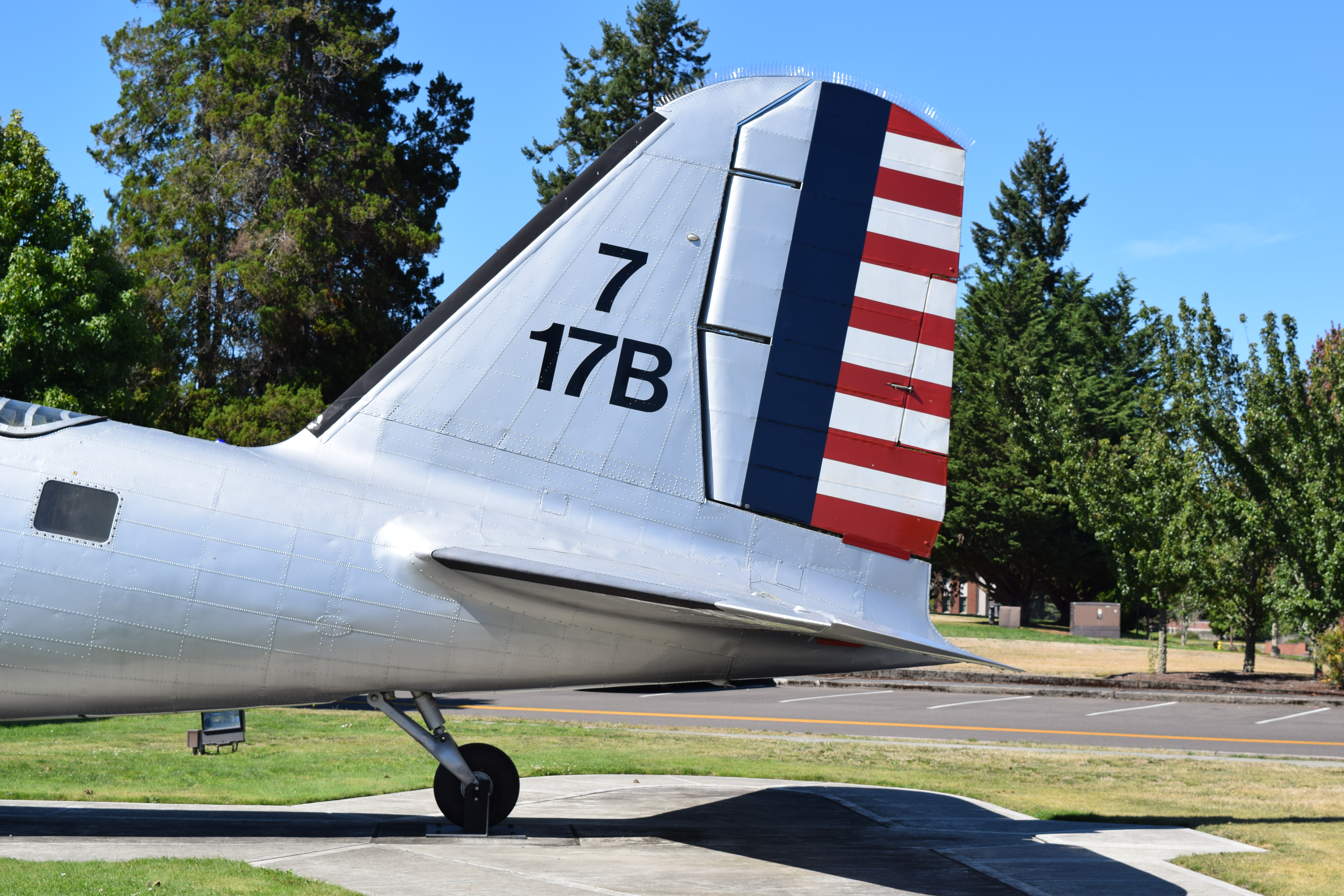
Empennage section

While the Boeing design was clearly superior, the 299's four engines eliminated it from consideration despite being the favorite, and the crash of the prototype — caused by taking off with the controls still locked — put its purchase on hold. The Martin 146 was a minor improvement on the B-10, and was never seriously considered. During the depths of the Great Depression, the lower price of the DB-1 at $58,500 compared to $99,620 for the Model 299 also favored the Douglas entry, and it was ordered into immediate production in January 1936 as the B-18.

The DB-1 design was modified from that of the DC-2. The wingspan was 4.5 ft (1.4 m) greater, the fuselage was narrower and deeper, and the wings were moved up to a mid-wing position to allow space under the spars for an enclosed bomb bay. Added armament included manually operated nose, dorsal, and ventral gun turrets.

At one point, Preston Tucker's firm received a contract to supply Tucker remote controlled gun turrets but these were unsuccessful, and were never used in service.

== Operational history ==
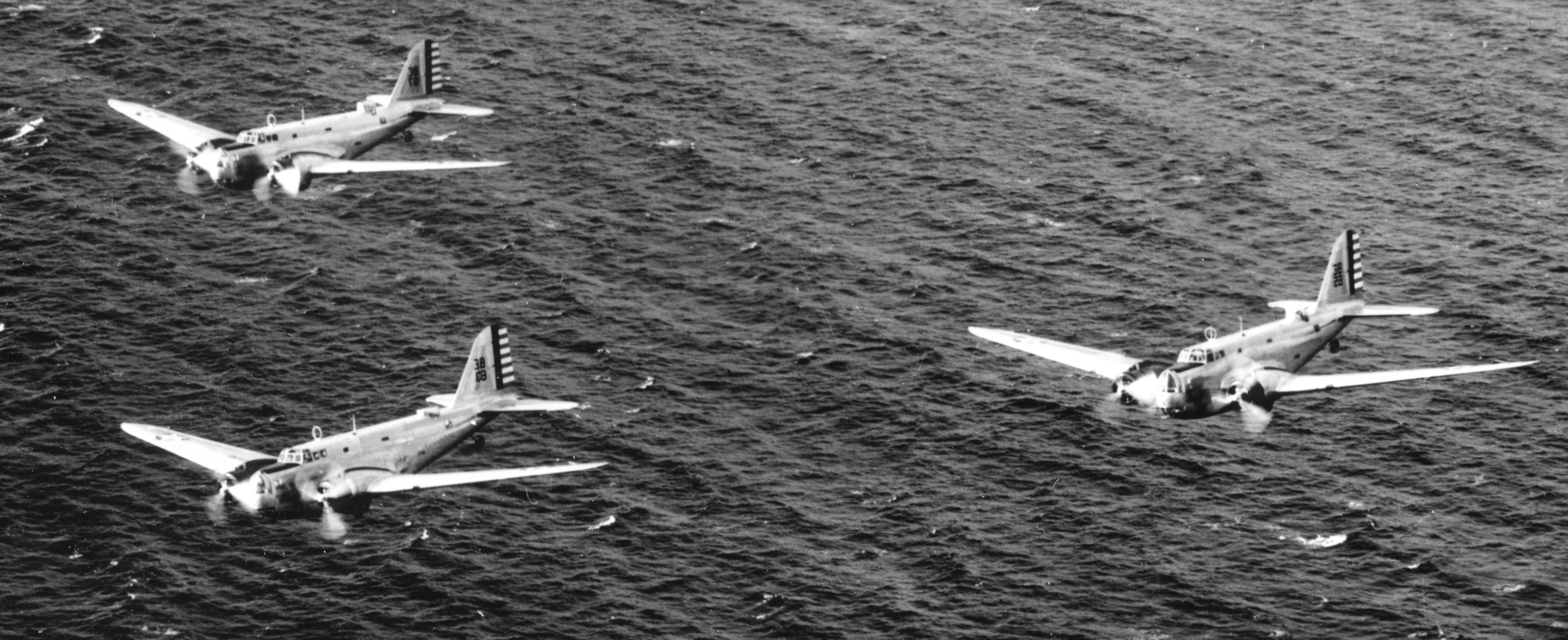
B-18 formation during exercises over Hawaii, 1940–1941

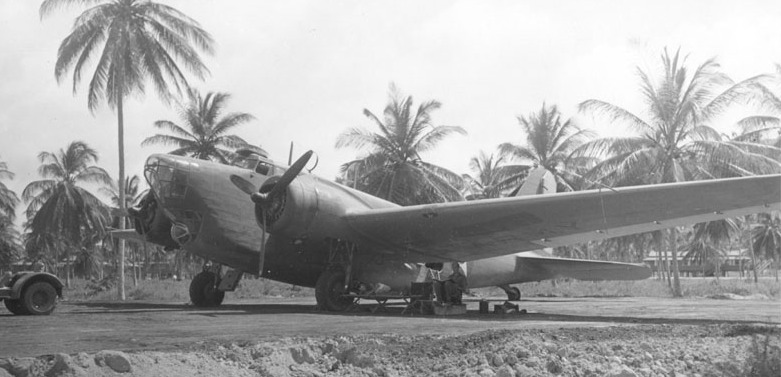
B-18A at Aguadulce Army Airfield in Panama

The initial contract called for 133 B-18s (including the prototype), using Wright R-1820 radial engines. The last B-18 of the run, designated DB-2 by the company, had a power-operated nose turret in a redesigned nose but this did not become standard. Additional contracts in 1937 (177 aircraft) and 1938 (40 aircraft) were for the B-18A, which had the bombardier's position further forward over the nose-gunner's station in a wedge shaped nose and the B-18A was fitted with more powerful engines.

Deliveries of B-18s to Army units began in the first half of 1937, with the first examples being test and evaluation aircraft being turned over to the Materiel Division at Wright Field, Ohio, the Technical Training Command at Chanute Field, Illinois, the Aberdeen Proving Ground, Maryland, and Lowry Field, Colorado. Deliveries to operational groups began in late 1937, the first being the 7th Bombardment Group at Hamilton Field, California.

Production B-18s, with full military equipment, had a maximum speed of 217 mph (349 km/h), cruising speed of 167 mph (269 km/h), and combat range of 850 mi (1,370 km). By 1940, most USAAC bomber squadrons were equipped with B-18s or B-18As.

However, the B-18/B-18A's deficiencies were made apparent when an all-red Soviet Ilyushin TsKB-30 named Moskva (a prototype for the twin-engine DB-3 which flew the same year as the B-18) made a non-stop flight from Moscow to North America in April 1939, a distance of 4,970 mi (8,000 km), which was well beyond the capabilities of the B-18. The TsKB-30/DB-3 was also 25% faster, was capable of carrying a bomb load 2.5 times as large as the B-18, and carried a heavier defensive armament. In August of the same year, a Japanese Mitsubishi G3M2 named Nippon (which also had its first flight the same year as the B-18) flew from Tokyo to the United States, and then around the world, with the stage from Chitose, Hokkaido to Nome, Alaska being over 2,500 mi (4,000 km). The military version of the Mitsubishi G3M (code-named Nell during World War II) could also carry more than the B-18, farther and faster, and was also better-armed. Both types had service ceilings that were roughly 7,000 ft (2,100 m) higher as well.

The Air Corps conceded that the Bolo was obsolete and unsuitable for its intended role. However, in spite of this, the B-18/B-18A was still the most numerous American bomber type deployed outside the continental United States at the time of the attack on Pearl Harbor. The B-18 would be a stopgap until the more capable Boeing B-17 Flying Fortress and Consolidated B-24 Liberator became available in quantity.

=== World War II ===
When war came to the Pacific in December 1941, most of the B-18 and B-18A aircraft based overseas in the Philippines and in Hawaii were destroyed on the ground in the initial Japanese onslaught. The few Bolos that remained played no significant role in subsequent operations.

The B-18s remaining in the continental United States and in the Caribbean were then deployed in a defensive role in anticipation of attacks on the US mainland. These attacks never materialized. B-17s supplanted B-18s in first-line service in 1942. Following this, 122 B-18As were modified for anti-submarine warfare. The bombardier was replaced by a search radar with a large radome. Magnetic anomaly detection (MAD) equipment was sometimes housed in a tail boom. These aircraft, designated B-18B, were used in the Caribbean on anti-submarine patrol. On 2 October 1942, a B-18A, piloted by Captain Howard Burhanna Jr. of the 99th Bomb Squadron, depth charged and sank the German submarine U-512 north of Cayenne, French Guiana.

Two aircraft were transferred to the Brazilian Air Force in 1942, and were used with a provisional conversion training unit set up under the provisions of Lend-Lease. They were later used for anti-submarine patrols. They were struck off at the end of the war.

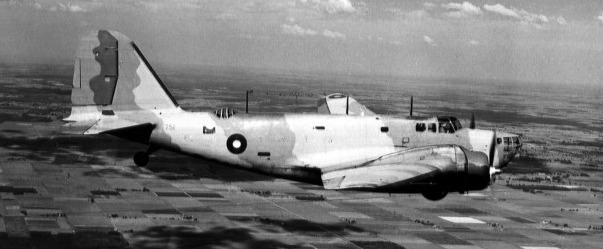
RCAF Digby in flight

In 1940 the Royal Canadian Air Force acquired 20 B-18As (as the Douglas Digby Mark I), and also used them for patrol duties, being immediately issued to 10 Squadron to replace the squadron's Westland Wapitis.

Bolos and Digbys sank an additional two submarines during the course of the war. RCAF Eastern Air Command (EAC) Digbys carried out 11 attacks on U-boats. U-520 was confirmed sunk by Flying Officer F. Raymes' crew of No. 10 (BR) Squadron, on 30 October 1942. east of Newfoundland. However, the antisubmarine role was relatively short-lived, and the Bolos were superseded in this role in 1943 by B-24 Liberators, which had a much heavier payload and a substantially longer range, which finally closed the mid-Atlantic gap. Some of the Douglas Digbys in Canadian service were converted into transports or used for training.

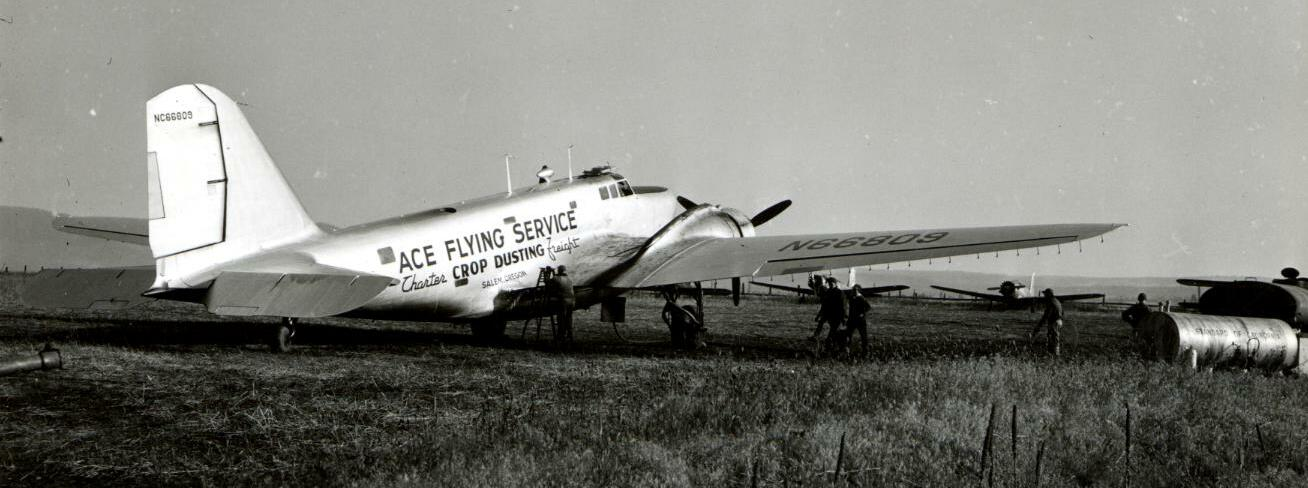
Crop spraying Bolo

Surviving USAAF B-18s ended their useful lives in training and transport roles, and saw no further combat action. Two B-18As were modified as unarmed cargo transports under the designation C-58. At the end of the war, remaining examples were sold as surplus on the commercial market. Some postwar B-18s were operated as cargo or crop-spraying aircraft by commercial operators.

== Variants ==
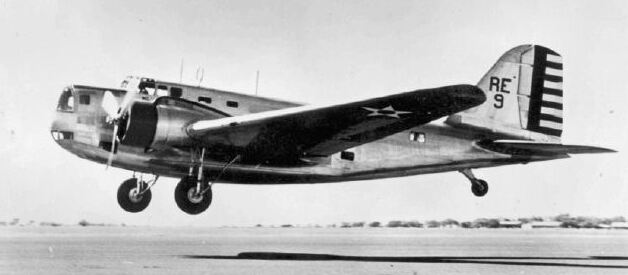
Early B-18 with characteristic short nose

DB-1
Manufacturer's designation for prototype, first of B-18 production run, 1 built.
B-18
Initial production version, 131 or 133 built.

B-18M

Trainer B-18 with bomb gear removed.
DB-2

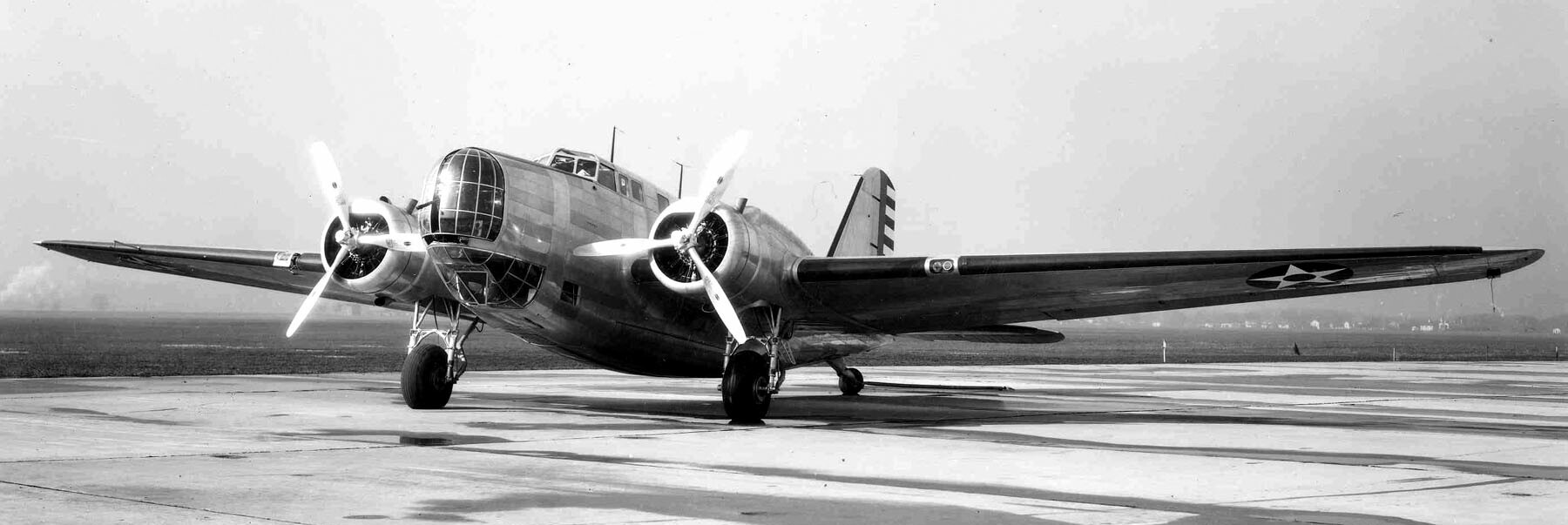
DB-2 showing the powered nose turret and redesigned nose

Manufacturer's designation for prototype with powered nose turret; last of B-18 production run, 1 built.
B-18A
B-18 with more powerful Wright R-1820-53 engines and relocated bombardier's station, 217 built. Manufacturer's designation was DB-4.
B-18AM
Trainer B-18A with bomb gear removed.
B-18B

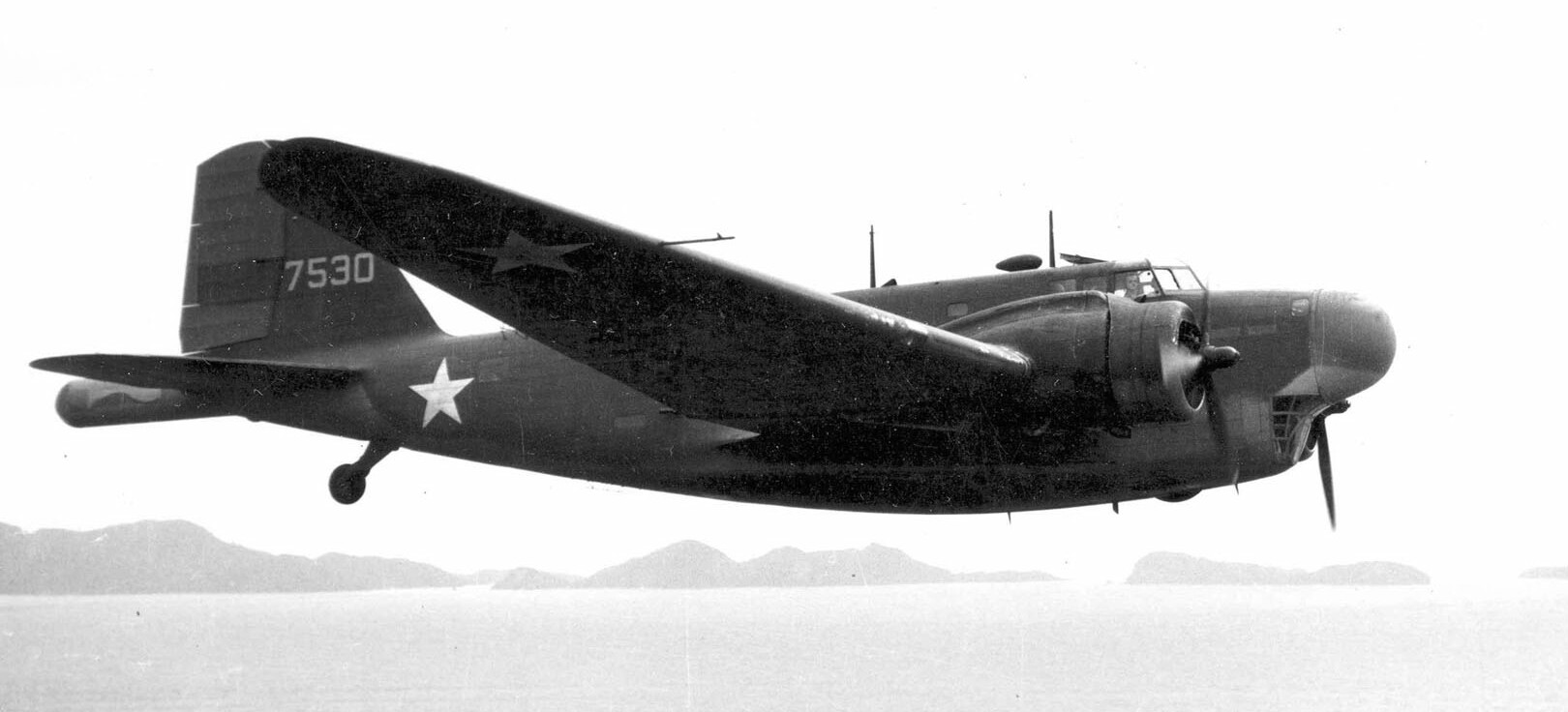
B-18B in flight, showing Magnetic Anomaly Detector in tail and radar in nose

Antisubmarine conversion, 122 converted by adding a radar and magnetic anomaly detector.
B-18C
Antisubmarine conversion, 2 converted. Fixed forward-firing .50 in (12.700 mm) machine gun, starboard side of the fuselage near lower nose glazing.
XB-22
Improved B-18 with 1,600 hp (1,200 kW) Wright R-2600-3 radial engines. Not built, due to better designs being available.
C-58
Transport conversion.
Digby Mark I
Royal Canadian Air Force modification of B-18A. Named for RAF Digby.

== Operators ==
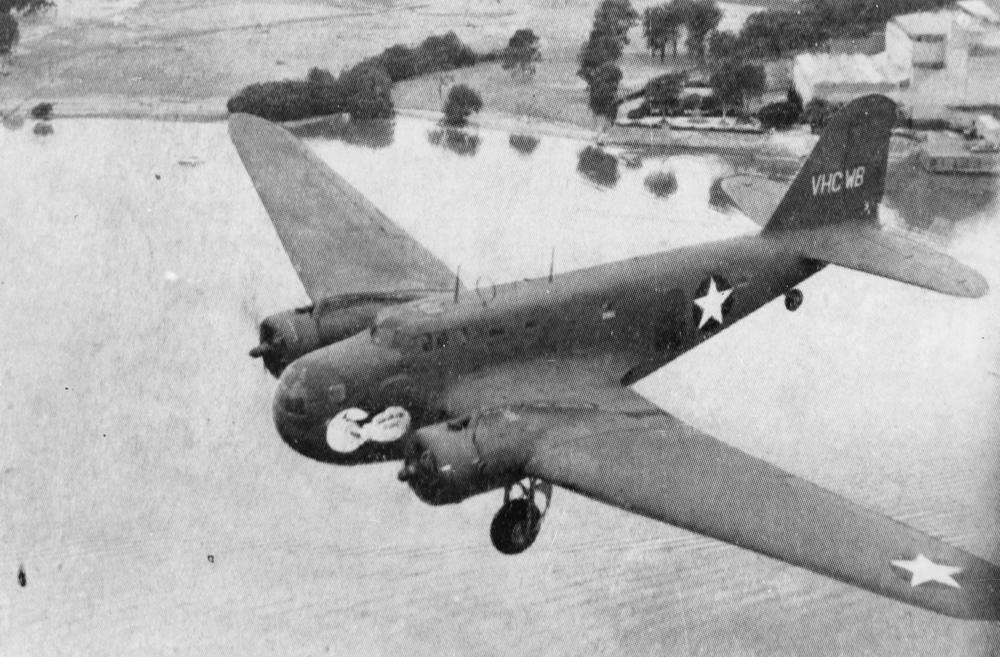
B-18 operated by Australian National Airways for the USAAF, over the Brisbane River in 1943

Brazil

- Brazilian Air Force

1st Bomber Group (3 examples)
Canada

- Royal Canadian Air Force

No. 10 Squadron RCAF, Halifax, Nova Scotia (Digby Mk.1)
United States

- United States Army Air Corps/United States Army Air Forces

1st Search Attack Group, Langley Field, Virginia (B-18A/B/C)
2d Bombardment Group, Langley Field, Virginia (B-18A)
3d Bombardment Group, Barksdale Field, Louisiana (B-18)
5th Bombardment Group, Hickam Field, Hawaii (B-18) (Note: Most aircraft were destroyed on 7 and 8 December 1941 during the Japanese attacks on the outbreak of war between Japan and the US.)
6th Bombardment Group, Rio Hato Airfield, Panama, (B-18/B-18A/B)
7th Bombardment Group, Hamilton Field, California, (B-18)
5th Bombardment Group, Luke Field, Oahu, Hawaii Territory (B-18)
9th Bombardment Group, Caribbean; Panama and South American air bases (B-18/B-18A/B)
11th Bombardment Group, Hickam Field, Hawaii Territory (B-18)
13th Bombardment Group, Langley Field, Virginia (B-18A/B)
17th Bombardment Group, McChord Field, Washington (B-18)
19th Bombardment Group, Clark Field, Philippines Commonwealth (B-18)
22d Bombardment Group, Muroc Field, California (B-18)
25th Bombardment Group, Caribbean (B-18/B)
27th Bombardment Group, Barksdale Field, Louisiana (B-18)
28th Bombardment Group, California, (B-18)
28th Composite Group, Elmendorf Field, Alaska, (B-18A)
29th Bombardment Group, Langley Field (B-18A)
40th Bombardment Group, Panama, Puerto Rico (B-18/B)
41st Bombardment Group, California, (B-18)
42nd Bombardment Group, Portland, Oregon (B-18)
45th Bombardment Group, Savannah Airfield, Georgia (B-18A)
47th Bombardment Group, McChord Field, Washington (B-18)
479th Antisubmarine Group, Langley Field, Virginia (B-18A/B)

== Aircraft on display ==
Seven B-18s are known to exist, five of them preserved or under restoration in museums in the United States, and two are wrecks still located at their crash sites:

B-18

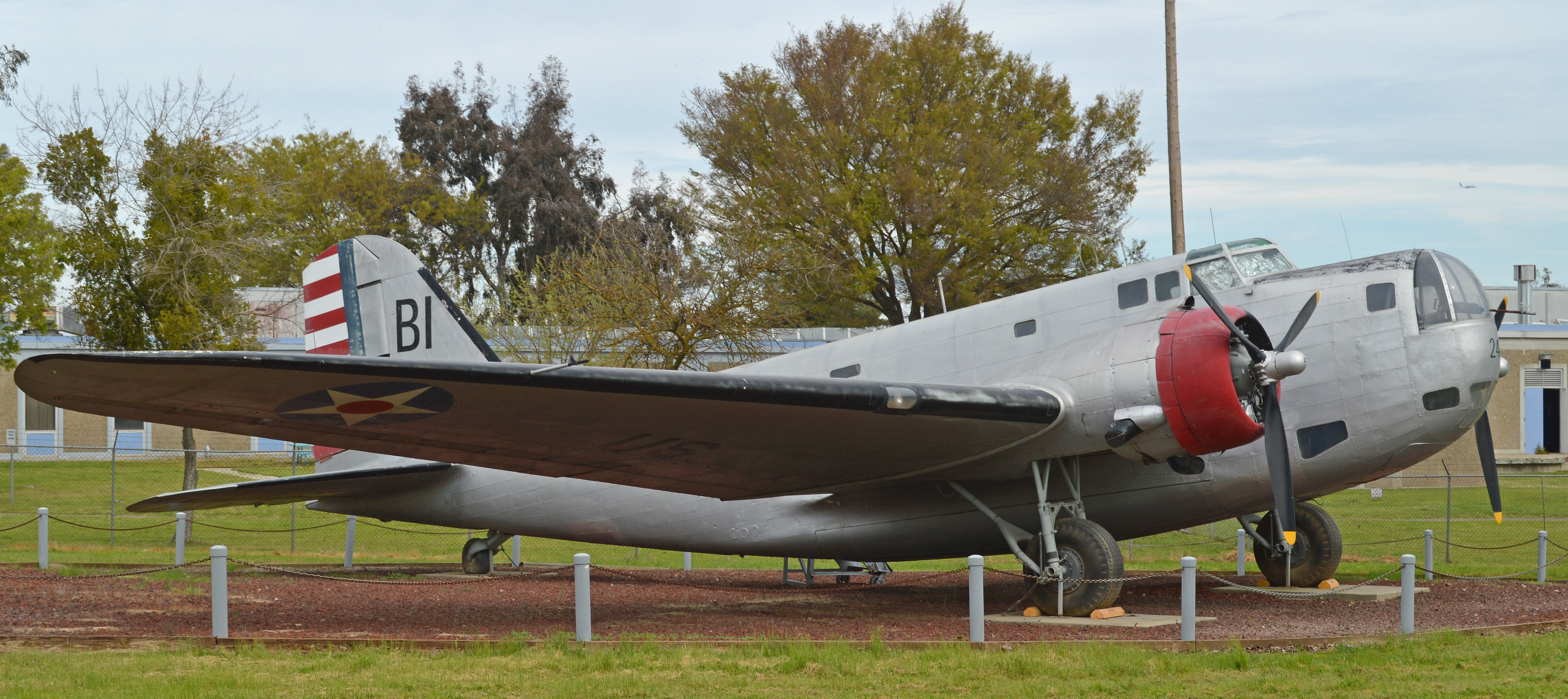
B-18 at Castle Air Museum in California

- 36-446 – Kohala Mountains, Hawaii. Tail code "81 50R". Crashed in 1941 and abandoned. The Air Force recovered the nose turret for 37-029 and the dorsal turret for 37-469. The Pacific Air Museum in Honolulu has had plans to recover the airframe.
- 37-029 – Castle Air Museum at the former Castle Air Force Base in Atwater, California. Dropped from USAAF inventory in 1944, it was registered as NC52056 in 1945, later to N52056. The B-18 was used by Avery Aviation and then Hawkins and Powers, as a firebomber, dropping borate for many years.

B-18A

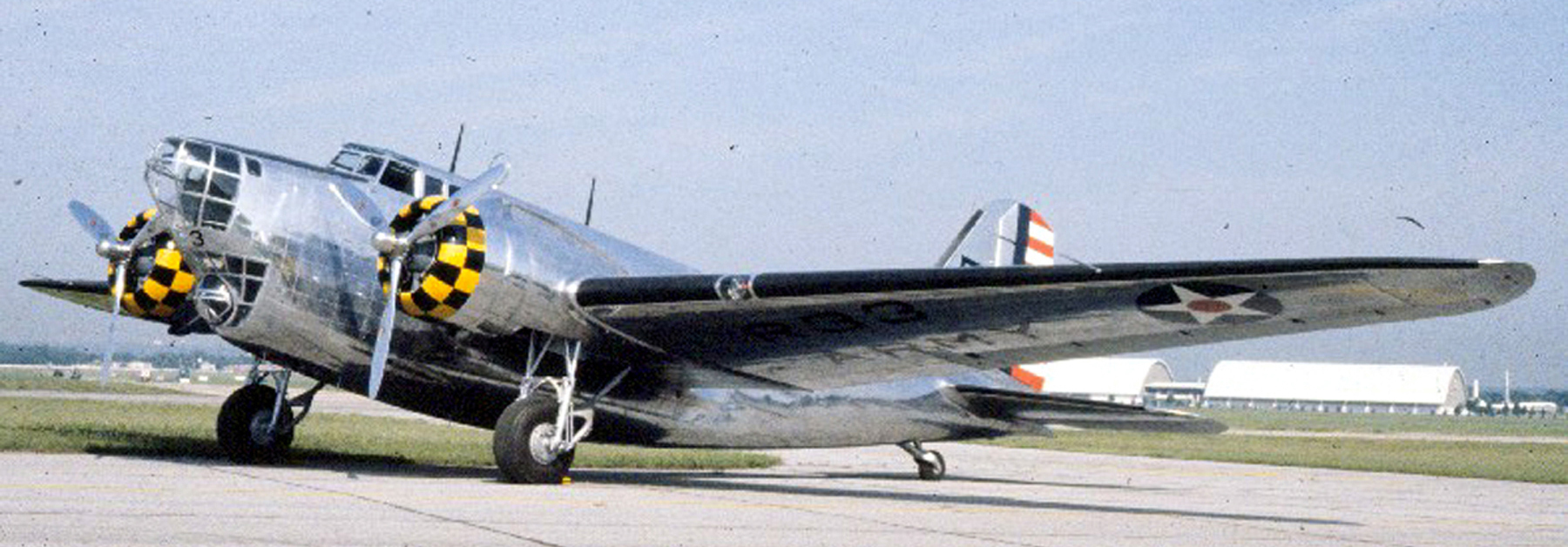
B-18A at the National Museum of the United States Air Force, in Ohio

37-619 Mt Waternomee, Woodstock, NH. This aircraft crashed into the upper slope of Mt. Waternomee January 14th, 1942 after the pilots became disoriented while returning to Westover Field(now Westover Air Force Base) in Chicopee, MA. Upon crashing, the live ordinance carried by the aircraft began to detonate, scattering wreckage in a wide area. 5 of the 7 crew survived, largely due to the response of the townspeople who heard the crash and mounted a rescue party. There are no plans to recover what is left of the aircraft, and the site is commemorated by a bronze plaque affixed to a rock, roughly in the center of the wreckage field. https://uphsnh.org/the-bomber-crash

- 37-469 – National Museum of the United States Air Force at Wright-Patterson Air Force Base in Dayton, Ohio. One of the first production Bolos, was delivered to Wright Field in 1937 for evaluation testing. Sold as N56847, converted to crop sprayer; by May 1969 stored derelict at Tucson, Arizona. It sat outdoors for many years, before being restored to static display condition. This aircraft has an incorrect dorsal turret. The museum has been attempting to locate a correct turret for this aircraft for many years.
- 39-025 – Wings Over the Rockies Air and Space Museum at the former Lowry Air Force Base in Denver, Colorado. This Bolo spent World War II at several airfields as a bombardier trainer and as a light transport. It was dropped from inventory on 3 November 1944, and was later sold, acquiring the civil registry NC62477. It spent 14 years on the civil registry before going to Cuba in 1958. In November 1958 the aircraft was seized in Florida by US Treasury agents when it was hauling guns to Fidel Castro. In 1960, the aircraft was parked at Cannon AFB, New Mexico, until being presented to the National Museum of the United States Air Force at Wright-Patterson AFB. It flew to the museum in April 1961. In 1988, the aircraft was transferred to the Wings Over The Rockies Aviation and Space Museum where it was restored through the 1990s. It is displayed there as AAC Ser. No. 39-522.

B-18A/B

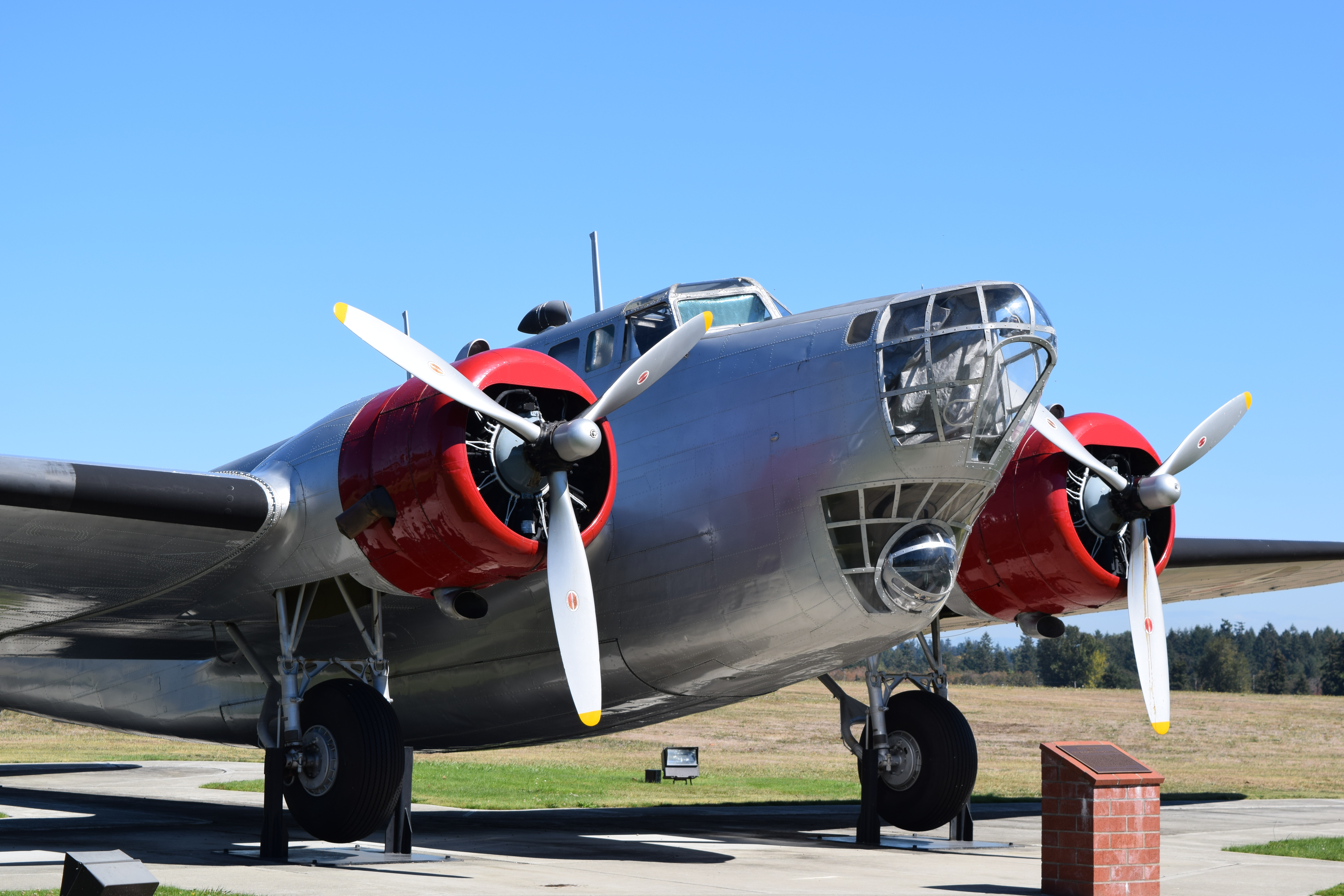
B-18A Bolo 37-505 at McChord Air Museum, 2016

- 37-505 – On display at McChord Air Museum, Washington. Built as a B-18, converted during WWII to B-18B. Later sold as N67947 for agricultural chemical spraying, then Mexican registration XB-LAJ transporting fish. Donated to Tucson Air Museum Foundation, Pima County, Arizona, this was the last flyable B-18, making its final flight to Tucson on 10 April 1971. Subsequently acquired by the National Museum of the United States Air Force and stored at Davis-Monthan AFB until moved by C-5A to McChord Air Museum in 1983 for restoration. Rebuilt as model B-18A and displayed from 2007.

B-18B

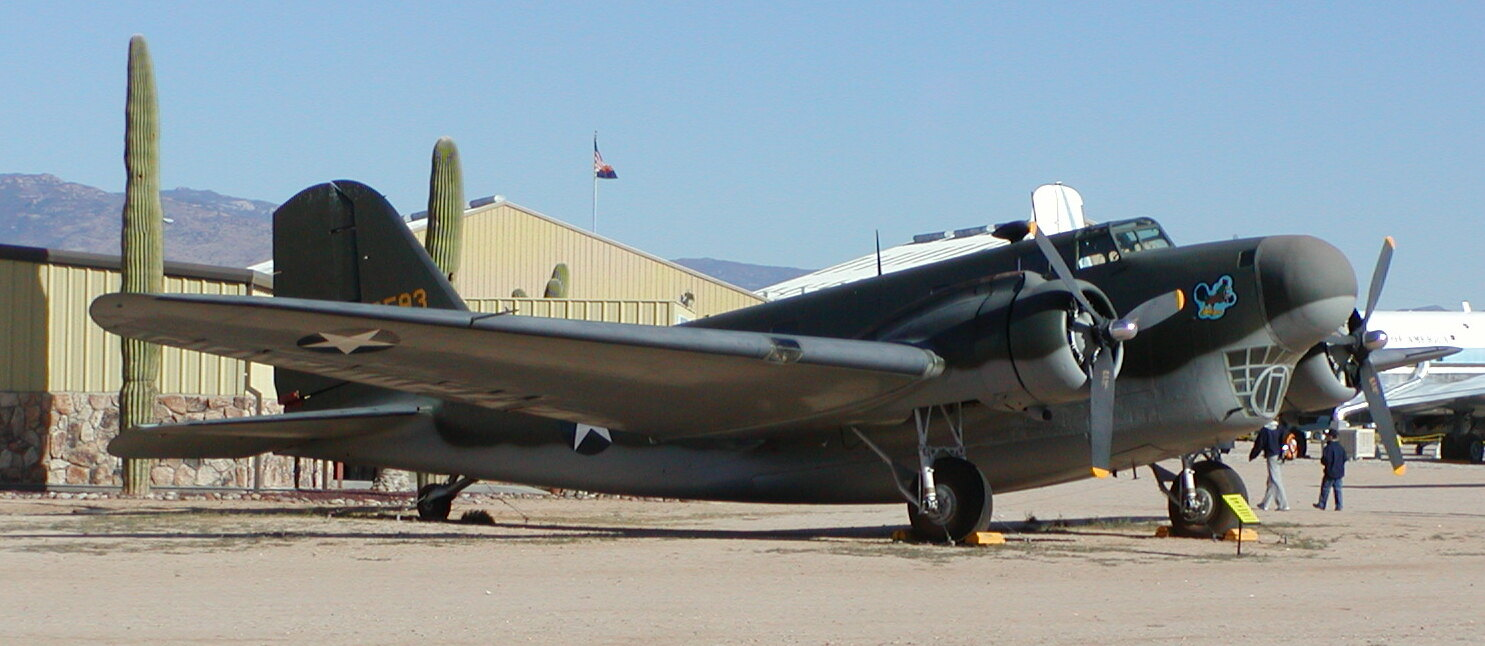
B-18B at Pima Air Museum in Arizona

- 38-593 – Pima Air & Space Museum adjacent to Davis-Monthan Air Force Base in Tucson, Arizona. This Bolo spent the early part of WWII on anti-submarine patrol. In 1943 began use as a light transport. She was retired and struck from the inventory in 1945. Was operated as a firebomber as N66267, 1954–1970. In storage at Phoenix Goodyear Airport, Litchfield Park, Arizona by September 1969, then delivered to Pima on 5 September 1976. The aircraft sat outside in the desert for many years, before being restored and moved indoors for display. The aircraft is still equipped with an antisubmarine search radar dome.

== Specifications (B-18A) ==
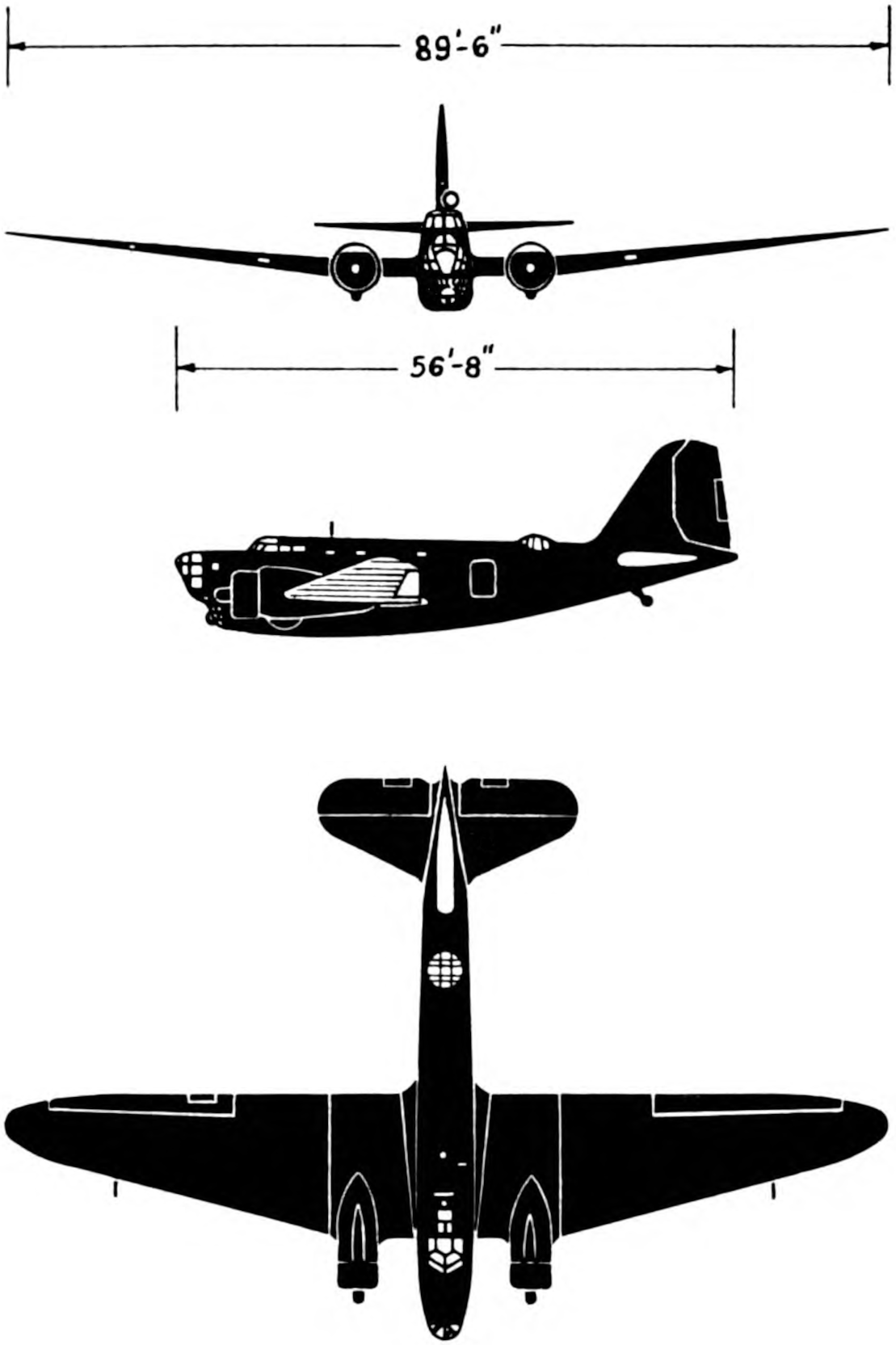
Douglas B-18A Bolo 3-view silhouette

Data from McDonnell Douglas aircraft since 1920 : Volume I

General characteristics

- Crew: Six
- Length: 57 ft 10 in (17.63 m)
- Wingspan: 89 ft 6 in (27.28 m)
- Height: 15 ft 2 in (4.62 m)
- Wing area: 959 sq ft (89.1 m^{2})
- Airfoil: root: NACA 2215; tip: NACA 2209
- Empty weight: 16,320 lb (7,403 kg)
- Gross weight: 24,000 lb (10,886 kg)
- Max takeoff weight: 27,673 lb (12,552 kg)
- Powerplant: 2 × Wright R-1820-53 Cyclone 9-cylinder air-cooled radial piston engines, 1,000 hp (750 kW) each
- Propellers: 3-bladed fully-feathering Hamilton Standard Hydromatic propellers

Performance

- Maximum speed: 216 mph (348 km/h, 188 kn) at 10,000 ft (3,000 m)
- Cruise speed: 167 mph (269 km/h, 145 kn)
- Range: 900 mi (1,400 km, 780 nmi)
- Ferry range: 2,100 mi (3,400 km, 1,800 nmi)
- Service ceiling: 23,900 ft (7,300 m)
- Time to altitude: 10,000 ft (3,000 m) in 9 minutes 54 seconds
- Wing loading: 25 lb/sq ft (120 kg/m^{2})
- Power/mass: 0.0833 hp/lb (0.1369 kW/kg)

Armament

- Guns: 3 × 0.30 in (7.62 mm) machine guns
- Bombs: 2,000 lb (910 kg) normal; 4,400 lb (2,000 kg) maximum

Avionics

- B-18B (only)
  - SCR-517-T-4 ASV radar
  - Mark IV Magnetic anomaly detector (MAD)

== See also ==
Related development

- Douglas DC-2
- Douglas B-23 Dragon

Aircraft of comparable role, configuration, and era

- Armstrong Whitworth Whitley
- Bréguet 460 Vultur
- Caproni Ca.135
- Handley Page H.P.51
- Heinkel He 111
- Ilyushin DB-3
- Mitsubishi G3M
- Mitsubishi Ki-21
- Vickers Wellington

Related lists

- List of aircraft of World War II
- List of bomber aircraft
- List of military aircraft of the United States
