= Nippon (aircraft) =

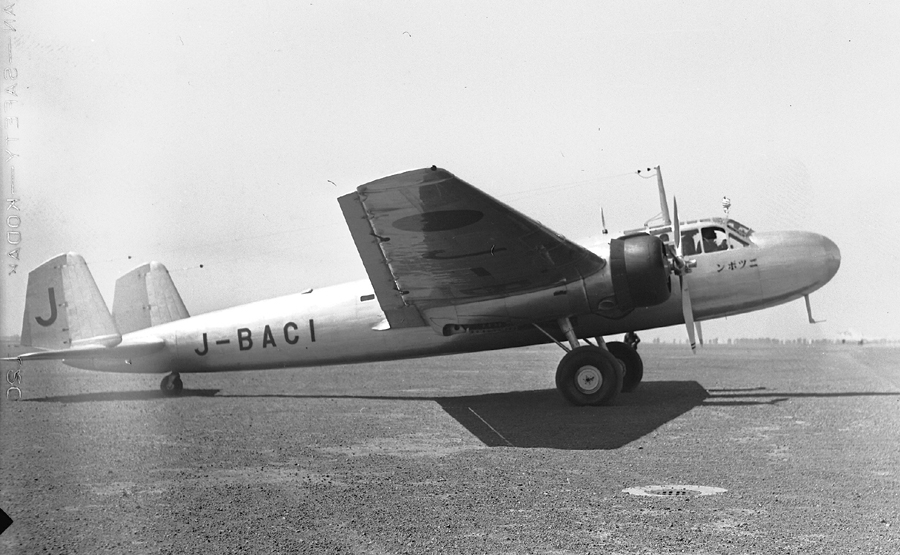
- Nippon side view

General information
- Type: Mitsubishi G3M2 Model 21
- Manufacturer: Mitsubishi
- Owners: Mainichi Shimbun
- Construction number: 328
- Registration: J-BACI
- Flights: One around the world flight from 26 August 1939 to 20 october 1939 covering 52,867 km; 28,546 nmi (32,850 mi) in 194 flying hours.

History
- Fate: Unknown, probably scrapped.

Nippon (ニッポン, Nippon) was a converted Mitsubishi G3M2 Model 21 bomber operated by the Mainichi Shimbun newspaper and used to make a round-the-world flight in 1939.

== The round the World flight ==
Nippon took off from Haneda airport in the district of Kamata in Tokyo on 25 August 1939, flew around the globe and returned to Tokyo, after 55 days, on 20 October 1939 having flown 52,886 km (32,862 mi; 28,556 nmi) in 194 flying hours.

== The aircraft ==
Nippon had the armament removed, was equipped with the latest autopilot and could carry 5,200 L of fuel enabling it to fly continuously for 24 hours.

== Flight course ==
Tokyo - Chitose - Nome, Alaska - Fairbanks, USA - Whitehorse - Seattle - Oakland, USA - Los Angeles - Albuquerque, USA - Chicago - New York - Washington D.C - Miami - San Salvador, El Salvador - Cali, Colombia - Lima - Arica - Santiago - Buenos Aires - Santos (Brazil) - Dakar - Casablanca Morocco - Seville, Spain - Rhodos, Greece - Basra (Iraq) - Karachi - Kolkata, India - Bangkok - Taipei - Haneda, Tokyo

== Specifications (Mitsubishi G3M2 Model 21) ==
Data from The Mitsubishi G3M "Nell"; Imperial Japanese Navy Bombers of World War Two;

General characteristics

- Crew: 7
- Length: 16.45 m (54 ft 0 in)
- Wingspan: 25 m (82 ft 0 in)
- Height: 3.68 m (12 ft 1 in)
- Wing area: 75 m^{2} (810 sq ft)
- Empty weight: 4,965 kg (10,946 lb)
- Gross weight: 8,000 kg (17,637 lb)
- Fuel capacity: 3,874 L (852.2 imp gal; 1,023.4 US gal) (Nippon 5,200 L (1,143.8 imp gal; 1,373.7 US gal))
- Powerplant: 2 × Mitsubishi Kinsei 9-cyl. air-cooled radial piston engines, 791 kW (1,061 hp) each

Performance

- Maximum speed: 375 km/h (233 mph, 202 kn) (Nippon 400 km/h (249 mph; 216 kn))
- Cruise speed: 280 km/h (170 mph, 150 kn)
- Range: 4,400 km (2,700 mi, 2,400 nmi)
- Endurance: (Nippon: 24 hours)
- Service ceiling: 9,200 m (30,200 ft)
- Rate of climb: 6 m/s (1,200 ft/min)

== Occupants ==
There were seven occupants in total.

Captain
Sumitoshi NAKAO 中尾純利
Flight engineer
Hajime SHIMOKAWA 下川一
Communication operator
Nobusada SATO 佐藤信貞
Pilot
Shigeo YOSHIDA 吉田重雄
Professional Engineer
Hiroshi SAEKI 佐伯弘
Flight engineer
Nagasaku YAOKAWA 八尾川長作
Ambassador of goodwill
Takeo OHARA 大原武夫, Aerial director of Mainichi Shimbun.
