= List of United States Air Force communications squadrons =

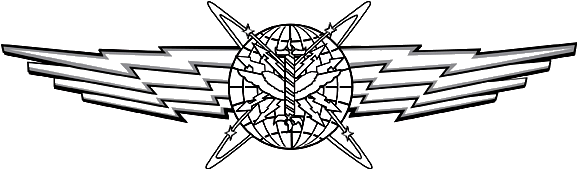
Cyber Operator badge

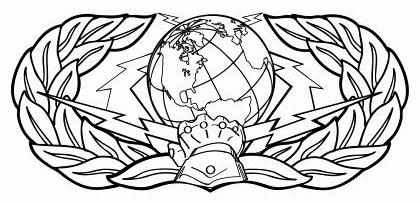
Cyberspace Support, later Cyber Defense Operations badge

The United States Air Force has several variants of squadrons focused on communications and cyberspace.

== Air Communications Squadrons (ACOMS) ==
An Air Communications Squadron, sometimes Air and Space Communications Squadron, is usually assigned to either a standard Numbered Air Force (NAF) or an Air Operations Center and directly supports the Air Operations Center.

Squadron	Emblem	Location	Note
56th Air and Space Communications Squadron		Hickam AFB	Supports 13 AF's 613th Air and Space Operations Center, COMPACAF, and COMUSPACOM
101st Air Communications Squadron		Tyndall AFB	Supports the 601st AOC, CONR-1AF(AFNORTH); Florida ANG, activated 2013
603d Air and Space Communications Squadron		Ramstein AB, Germany	Supports USAFE and AFRICOM. Was 603 Air Comm Flt.
607th Air Communications Squadron		Osan Air Base, South Korea	Supported 7 AF/AFKOR KAOC. Inactivated 1 Feb 2011; mission rolled into newly reactivated 607 SPTS; redesignated 607 ACOMS 27 June 2018.
608th Air Communications Squadron		Barksdale AFB	Supports 8 AF's 608th Air Operations Center
609th Air Communications Squadron		Shaw AFB	Supports 9th Air Force/USAFCENT 609th Air Operations Center (CAOC)
609th Expeditionary Air Communications Squadron		Al Udeid AB	Supports 9th Air Force/USAFCENT 609th Air Operations Center (CAOC)
611th Air Communications Squadron		JB Elmendorf-Richardson	Supports Alaska NORAD Region, 11 AF, and 611 AOC
612th Air Communications Squadron		Davis–Monthan AFB	Jul 94- 12 AF/AFSOUTH CAOC
614th Air and Space Communications Squadron		Vandenberg Space Force Base	Was 614 Space Comm Sq; Transferred to Space Force; redesignated 65th Cyber Squadron on 23 June 2021 and defends Space Delta 5.
616th Air Communications Squadron		Joint Base San Antonio-Kelly Field	Supports 616th Operations Center, Sixteenth Air Force (Air Forces Cyber)
618th Air Communications Squadron		Scott AFB, IL	Supports 618th Air and Space Operations Center (Tanker Airlift Control Center)
625th Air Communications Squadron		Scott AFB, IL	Supported 625th Operations Center, AF JWICS enterprise, 25 AF HQ, and AF IC systems

== Communications Groups (CG) and Squadrons (CS) ==
Old Communications and Information badge

The emblems of many communications squadrons feature the armored fist and three lightning bolts of the previous career field's Communications and Information badge, which was based on the emblem first approved for Air Force Communications Service.

Squadron	Emblem	Location	Note
1st Communications Squadron, Air Force		Moriyama AS, Fuchu AS, Japan	1946–1959 Formerly 1715th Signal Service Battalion. Redesignated 1st Special Operations Communications Squadron.
1st Communications Squadron		March AFB, CA George AFB, CA Langley AFB, VA	1948–1952, 1991–2010. Redesignated 633d Communications Squadron. Designated 1st Operations Squadron from 1955 to 1963. See 1st Fighter Wing
2d Communications Squadron, Division		Kimpo AB, Seoul, Osan AB Taegu AB Korea	1946–1957 Formerly 1717th Signal Service Company. Also 2d Communications Squadron, Operations. Disbanded 1983.
2d Communications Squadron		Davis–Monthan AFB, AZ Chatham AFB, GA Hunter AFB, GA	1948–1952. Inactive.
2d Communications Squadron		Buckley AFB, CO Barksdale AFB, LA	1971–1992, 1992–Present see 2d Bomb Wing
3d Communications Squadron, Wing		Wheeler AFB Hickam AFB, HI RAF Sculthorpe, UK	1947–1949, 1952–1954. Also 3d Communications Squadron, Operations. Redesignated 603d Communications Squadron.
3d Communications Squadron		Yokota AB Johnson AB Iwakuni AB, Japan Kunsan AB, Korea Kapaun Barracks, Germany Elmendorf AFB, AK	1948–1957, 1986–1992, 1992–2011. See 3d Wing
4th Communications Squadron, Wing		Kadena AB, Okinawa	1947. Inactive.
4th Communications Squadron		Andrews AFB, MD Langley AFB, VA New Castle County Airport, DE Johnson AB, Chitose AB, Japan Seymour Johnson AFB, NC	1948–1957. Inactive.
4th Communications Squadron		Seymour Johnson AFB, NC	1992–Present. Formerly 4th Satellite Communications Squadron, Mobile. See 4th Fighter Wing
5th Communications Squadron, Division		Itazuke AB, Japan Taegu AB, Seoul Air Base, Fuchu AS, Tachikawa AB, Japan	1946–1959. Formerly 1718th Signal Service Company. Also 5th Communications Squadron, Wing; 5th Communications Squadron, Command. Disbanded 1983.
5th Communications Squadron		Mountain Home AFB, ID Travis AFB, CA Woomera AS, Australia, Minot AFB	1949–1952, 1992–Present. Designated 5th Defense Space Communications Squadron 1970–1992. See 5th Bomb Wing
6th Communications Squadron, Air Force		Far East Air Forces unit	1946–1955 Formerly 305th Signal Company, Wing. Also 6th Communications Squadron, Wing. Disbanded 1983.
6th Communications Squadron		Walker AFB, NM MacDill AFB, FL	1951–1952. 1994–present See 6th Air Mobility Wing
7th Communications Squadron, Operations		Johnson AB, Japan Taegu AB, Korea	1947–1955. Also 7th Communications Squadron, Wing; 7th Communications Squadron, Command. Redesignated 607th Communications Squadron, Operations .
7th Communications Squadron		Carswell AFB Dyess AFB, TX	1948–1951, 1952, 1968–1972, 1991–present See 7th Bomb Wing
8th Communications Squadron, Wing		Ashiya AB, Itazuke AB, Japan Kimpo AB Suwon Air Base Kunsan AB, Korea	1946–1948. Formerly 325th Signal Company, Wing. Inactive.
8th Communications Squadron		Kunsan AB, South Korea; Harmon AFB, Guam	1948–1957, 1992–present. See 8th Fighter Wing
9th Communications Squadron, Air Force		Hickam AFB, HI	1948–1949, 1956–1957 Also 9th Communications Squadron, Wing. Inactive
9th Communications Squadron		Travis AFB Beale AFB, CA	1949–1951, 1952, 1972–1975, 1991–present. See 9th Reconnaissance Wing
10th Communications Squadron, Wing		unknown	Inactivated 25 Jan 1949, disbanded 1983.
10th Communications Squadron		United States Air Force Academy, CO	1948–1949, 1952–1959, 1991–Present See 10th Air Base Wing
11th Communications Squadron, Air Force		Kadena AB, Okinawa Johnson AB, Japan RAF South Ruislip, UK	1948–1949, 1949–1957, also 11th Communications Squadron, Command; 11th Communications Squadron, Theater Air Force. Disbanded 1983.
11th Communications Squadron		JB Anacostia-Bolling, DC	1952, 1994–2006. Inactive
12th Communications Squadron, Air Force		Hickam AFB Wheeler AFB, HI	1947–1957. Also 12th Communications Squadron, Command. Disbanded 1983.
12th Communications Squadron		Turner AFB, GA Bergstrom AFB Randolph AFB, TX	1950–1951, 1952–1952, 1991–present. 12th Operations Squadron 1972–1975, Consolidated with 1920th Communications Group. See 12th Flying Training Wing.
13th Communications Squadron, Division		Kadena AB. Okinawa	1946–1957. Formerly 413th Signal Company, Aviation. Also 13th Communications Squadron, Command; 13th Communications Squadron, Air Force. Disbanded 1983.
13th Communications Squadron, Depot		Tachikawa AB, Japan	1950–1952. Disbanded 1983.
14th Communications Squadron, Air Force		Fort William McKinley, Clark AB, Philippines Johnson AB, Tokorozawa Transmitter Site, Japan	1946–1948. 1949–1952, 1958–1959, 1968–1975. Formerly 398th Signal Company, Aviation. Also 14th Communications Squadron, Command. Disbanded 1983.
14th Communications Squadron		Dow AFB, ME Columbus AFB, MS	1948–1949, 1991–present. Consolidated with 1948th Communications Squadron. See 14th Flying Training Wing.
15th Communications Squadron, Air Force		Donaldson AFB, SC Sewart AFB, TN Fürstenfeldbruck AB, Germany Evreux-Fauville AB, France Shaw AFB, SC	1946–1947, 1952–1955, 1958–1963. Also 15th Communications Squadron, Command; 15th Communications Squadron, Operations. Redesignated 15th Operations Squadron, currently 15th Operations Support Squadron. See 15th Wing
15th Communications Squadron		Aviano AB, Italy Hickam AFB, HI	1968–1975, 1992–Present. See 15th Wing.
16th Communications Squadron		Fort William McKinley, Philippines Tokyo, Fuchu AS, Japan Hickam Air Force Base, HI Hurlburt Field, FL	1946–1959, 1993–2006. Formerly 1716th Signal Service Battalion. Also 16th Communications Squadron, Air Force; 16th Communications Squadron, Theater Air Force. See 16th Special Operations Wing
17th Communications Squadron, Command		Harmon AFB, Guam	1946–1949. Formerly 389th Signal Company, Aviation. Disbanded 1983.
17th Communications Squadron		Pusan Air Base, Lorea Miho AB, Japan Hurlburt Field, FL Beale AFB, CA Goodfellow AFB, TX	1952–1958, 1975–1977, 1993–Present. See 17th Training Wing
18th Communications Squadron		Carswell AFB, TX Westover AFB, MA	1946–1973. Also 18th Communications Squadron, Wing; 18th Communications Squadron, Command; 18th Communications Squadron, Air Force. Disbanded 1983.
18th Communications Squadron		Clark AB, Philippines Kimhae AB, Osan AB, Korea Kadena AB, Okinawa	1948–1957, 1991–Present. See 18th Fighter Wing
19th Communications Squadron, Command		Albrook AFB, Panama	1946–1949. Disbanded 1983.
19th Communications Squadron		Andersen AFB, Guam; Little Rock AFB, AR	1948–1953, 2008–Present. See 19th Airlift Wing
20th Communications Squadron, Air Force		Bad Kissingen AB, Germany; Rabat Sale AB, Morocco; Wheelus AB, Libya; Ramstein AB, Germany	1946–1949, 1953–1962. Formerly 346th Signal Company, Wing. Also 20th Communications Squadron, Wing; 20th Communications Squadron, Division. Disbanded 1983.
20th Communications Squadron		Shaw AFB, SC; RAF Wethersfield, UK	1948–1956. 1994–Present. Designated 20th Operations Squadron 1956–1958. See 20th Fighter Wing
21st Communications Squadron, Wing		Neubiberg AB, Bad Kissingen AB, Germany	1946–1947. Formerly 328th Signal Company, Wing. Redesignated 21st Combat Communications Squadron.
21st Communications Squadron		Chambley AB, France Peterson AFB	1953–1958, 1992–2002. Consolidated with 2163d Communications Group. Redesignated 21st Space Communications Squadron.
22d Communications Squadron, Troop Carrier Wing		McConnell AFB	1946–1947. Formerly 302d Signal Company, Troop Carrier Wing. Redesignated 22d Combat Communications Squadron.
22d Communications Squadron		Smoky Hill AFB, March AFB, McConnell AFB	1948–1951, 1952, 1991–Present. See 22d Air Refueling Wing
23d Communications Squadron, Command		Erlangen AB, Germany	1946–1947. Formerly 394th Signal Company, Aviation. Redesignated 23d Combat Communications Squadron.
23d Communications Squadron		North AFB, Guam; Howard AFB, CZ; Presque Isle AFB, ME; England AFB, LA; Moody AFB, GA	1948–1949, 1951–1952, 1991–1997, 2006–Present. Consolidated with 1908th Communications Squadron. See 23d Wing
24th Communications Squadron, Command		Erlangen AB, Germany	1946–1949. Formerly 311th Signal Company, Aviation. Disbanded 1983.
24th Communications Squadron		Clark AB Philippines Howard AFB, Panama	1949, 1991–1999. Also 24th Communications Squadron, Depot. Consolidated with 24th Communications Group.
25th Communications Squadron, Theater Air Force		Lindsey AS, Germany	1946–1962. Also 25th Communications Squadron, Command. Disbanded 1983.
25th Communications Squadron, Depot		Kelly AFB, TX; Hill AFB, UT	1949–1951. Disbanded 1983.
26th Communications Squadron, Command		Davis AFB, AL; Elmendorf AFB, AK	1946–1953. Also 26th Communications Squadron, Wing. Disbanded 1983.
27th Communications Squadron, Division		Andersen AFB, Guam	1954–1991. Also 27th Communications Squadron, Air Force; 27th Communications Squadron. Redesignated 633d Communications Squadron.
27th Communications Squadron	(1993–1995)	Cannon AFB, NM	1948–1951, 1952, 1991–2007. Consolidated with 2040th Communications Squadron. Redesignated 27th Special Operations Communications Squadron. See 27th Special Operations Wing.
28th Communications Squadron, Air Force		Hamilton AFB, California	1948–1961. Disbanded 1983
28th Communications Squadron		Ellsworth AFB, SD	1948–1951, 1952, 1991–Present. Consolidated with 2148th Communications Group. See 28th Bomb Wing.
29th Communications Squadron, Command		Langley AFB, VA	1946–1963. Also 29th Communications Squadron, Air Force. Disbanded 1983.
29th Communications Squadron, Depot		Kelly AFB, TX Norton AFB, CA	1949–1951. Disbanded 1983.
30th Communications Squadron, Command		Andrews AFB, MD Offutt AFB, NE	1946–1970. Also 30th Communications Squadron, Air Force. Disbanded 1983.
30th Communications Squadron		Kelly AFB, TX RAF Burtonwood Sealand Storage Station, RAF Brize Norton, UK Vandenberg AFB, CA	1950–1953, 1991–2002. Also 30th Communications Squadron, Depot. Redesignated 30th Space Communications Squadron.
31st Communications Squadron, Command		Offutt AFB, NE	1960–1970. Redesignated 31st Combat Communications Squadron.
31st Communications Squadron		Turner AFB, GA Homestead AFB, FL Aviano AFB	1948–1949, 1952, 1991–1994, 1994–Present. Consolidated with 1942d Communications Squadron. See 31st Fighter Wing
32d Communications Squadron, Command		Elkhorn Comm Annex, Hooper Comm Annex, NE	1960–1970. Redesignated 32d Combat Communications Squadron.
32d Communications Squadron		Kadena AB, Okinawa Camp New Amsterdam, Netherlands	1948–1949, 1991–1992. Consolidated with 1992d Communications Squadron. Redesignated 32d Communications Flight.
33d Communications Squadron, Air Force		Colorado Springs, CO March AFB, CA	1946–1976. Also 33d Communications Squadron, Command. Redesignated 33d Communications Group.
33d Communications Squadron		Walker AFB, NM Otis AFB, MA	1948–1952. Redesignated 33d Operations Squadron. Currently 33d Operations Support Squadron.
34th Communications Squadron, Air Force		Slocum AFB Mitchel AFB, NY	1948–1955. Also 34th Communications Squadron, Command. Disbanded 1983.
35th Communications Squadron, Command		Hamilton AFB, CA	1948–1960. Also 34th Communications Squadron, Air Force. Redesignated 35th Combat Communications Squadron.
35th Communications Squadron		Johnson AB Yokota AB, Japan Yonpo Airfield, North Korea, Pusan AB, South Korea George AFB, CA Misawa AB, Japan	1948–1957, 1991–1992, 1994–Present. Consolidated with 2167th Communications Squadron. See 35th Fighter Wing
36th Communications Squadron, Air Force		Offutt AFB, NE Benjamin Harrison AFB, IN Selfridge AFB, MI	1948–1960. Also 36th Communications Squadron, Command. Disbanded 1983.
36th Communications Squadron		Howard AFB, Panama Fürstenfeldbruck AB, Germany Bitburg AB, Germany Andersen AFB, Guam	1948–1962, 1991–1994, 1994–Present. Consolidated 1991 with 2139th Comm Sq. See 36th Wing
37th Communications Squadron, Air Force		Orlando AFB, FL Robins AFB, GA	1948–1960. Also 37th Communications Squadron, Command. Disbanded 1983.
37th Communications Squadron		Clovis AFB, NM Robins AFB, GA Tonopah Test Range, NV Lackland AFB, TX	1953, 1991–1992, 1993–Present. Consolidated with 1880th Communications Squadron. See 37th Training Wing.
38th Communications Squadron, Wing		Ramey AFB, Puerto Rico	1946–1948. Disbanded 1983.
38th Communications Squadron		Itami AB, Japan Laon AB, France	1946–1948, 1953–1958.
39th Communications Squadron		incirlik AB, Turkey	1992–present was 2006 Comm Sq
39th Communications Squadron, Wing		Howard AFB, Panama	1946–1948.
39th Communications Squadron, Depot		Elmendorf AFB, AK	1951–1953. Disbanded 1983.
40th Communications Squadron, Command		Brooks AFB, TX Pope AFB, NC	1949–1950. Disbanded 1983.
42d Communications Squadron, Air Force		Mitchel AFB Stewart AFB, NY	1949–1960. Also 42d Communications Squadron, Command. Redesignated 42d Combat Communications Squadron.
42d Communications Squadron		Loring AFB, ME Maxwell AFB, AL	1991–2008, 2008–Present. Formerly 2192d Communications Squadron. 42d Communications Flight 2008–2009. See 42d Air Base Wing
43d Communications Squadron, Air Force		Hamilton AFB, CA	1949–1960. Also 43d Communications Squadron, Command. Disbanded 1983.
43d Communications Squadron		Davis–Monthan AFB, AZ Malmstrom AFB MT Pope AFB NC	1949–1951, 1952, 1992–1994. 2007–2011.
45th Communications Squadron, Command		Mitchel AFB, NY	1949–1951. Redesignated 952d Reserve Communications Training Squadron
45th Communications Squadron		Patrick AFB, FL	1991–2002. Formerly 2179th Communications Squadron. Redesignated 45th Space Communications Squadron
46th Communications Squadron, Air Force		Barksdale AFB, LA	1951–1976, 1991–1992. Redesignated 46th Communications Group 1976–1991.
47th Communications Squadron, Command		Mitchel AFB, NY Ent AFB Peterson AFB, CO	1950–1966, 1978–1979. Disbanded 1983.
47th Communications Squadron		Biggs AFB, TX Barksdale AFB, LA Langley AFB, VA RAF Sculthorpe. UK	1948–1949, 1951–1956. Redesignated 47th Operations Squadron, most recently 47th Operations Support Squadron.
47th Communications Squadron		Laughlin AFB, TX	1994–Present. Formerly 647th Communications Squadron. See 47th Flying Training Wing.
48th Communications Squadron, Operations	Stewart AFB, NY	1952–1954. Disbanded 1983.	
48th Communications Squadron		Chaumont AB, France RAF Lakenheath, UK	1952–1959, 1991–Present. See 48th Fighter Wing.
49th Communications Squadron, Air Force		Torrejon AB, Spain	1951–1966. Also 49th Communications Squadron, Division. Disbanded 1983.
49th Communications Squadron		Misawa AB, Japan Taegu AB, Korea Etain AB, France Spangdahlem AB, Germany Holloman AFB, NM	1948–1962, 1991–Present. Consolidated with 1877th Communications Squadron. See 49th Wing
50th Communications Squadron, Air Force		Kansas City Richards-Gebaur AFB, MO	1951–1960. Consolidated with 1999th Communications Squadron as 750th Communications Squadron.
51st Communications Squadron, Operations		Pope AFB, NC Shaw AFB, SC	1952–1954. Redesignated 651st Communications Squadron, Operations.
51st Communications Squadron		Naha Air Base, Okinawa Osan Air Base, Korea	1948–1957, 1992–Present. See 51st Fighter Wing
52d Communications Squadron		Mitchel AFB, NY McGuire AFB, NJ Spangdahlem Air Base, Germany	1948–1952, 1991–Present. Consolidated with 2137th Communications Squadron. See 52d Fighter Wing
53d Communications Squadron, Operations		Lindsey AS, Germany	1952–1953. Disbanded 1983.
54th Communications Squadron, Operations		Lindsey AS, Germany	1952–1953. Disbanded 1983.
54th Communications Squadron		United States Air Force Academy, CO	1993–1994. Formerly 7625th Communications Squadron.
55th Communications Squadron, Operations		Chateauroux Air Base, France	1952–1953. Redesignated 55th Combat Communications Squadron.
55th Communications Squadron		Forbes AFB, KS Ramey AFB, Puerto Rico Offutt AFB, NE	1948–1949, 1950–1951, 1952, 1993–Present. See 55th Wing
56th Communications Squadron, Operations		Sewart AFB, TN	1952-unknown. Redesignated 56th Air Communications Squadron.
56th Communications Squadron		Selfridge AFB, MI MacDill AFB, Fl Luke AFB, AZ	1948–1952, 1991–1994, 1994–Present. See 56th Fighter Wing.
57th Communications Squadron, Operations	Donaldson AFB, SC	1952–1954. Redesignated 657th Communications Squadron, Operations.	
57th Communications Squadron	Elmendorf AFB, AK	1948–1951. Redesignated 56th Air Communications Squadron.	
58th Communications Squadron, Operations	Shaw AFB, SC	ca. 1957.	
58th Communications Squadron		Taegu AB Osan AB, Korea Luke AFB, AZ	1952–1957, 1991–1994.
59th Communications Squadron, Depot	RAF Burtonwood, UK	1949–1950. Redesignated 59th Operations Squadron.	
60th Communications Squadron		Kaufbeuren Air Base Rhein-Main Air Base Wiesbaden Air Base, Germany Travis AFB, CA	1948–1958, 1994–Present. See 60th Air Mobility Wing
61st Communications Squadron		Rhein-Main Air Base, Germany Los Angeles AFB, CA	1948–1951. 1994–Present. See 61st Air Base Wing
62d Communications Squadron		Larson AFB McChord AFB, WA	1948–1950. 1952–1957. 1991–2010. Inactive.
63d Communications Squadron		Floyd Bennett Field, NY Altus AFB, OK Donaldson AFB, SC Norton AFB, CA	1949–1951. 1953–1957. 1991–1994. Consolidated with 1965th Communications Squadron. Inactive.
64th Communications Squadron	Donaldson AFB, SC Reese AFB, TX	1952–1954. 1991–1997. Inactive.	
65th Communications Squadron		Lajes Air Base	1992–Present. Formerly 1605th Communications Squadron. See 65th Air Base Wing
67th Communications Squadron		March AFB, CA Tsuiki AB Komaki AB Itami AB Yokota AB, Japan Taegu AB Kimpo AB, Korea Bergstrom AFB, TX	1948–1949, 1951–1957, 1991–1993. Consolidated with 1882d Communications Squadron. Inactive.
70th Communications Squadron		Fort George G. Meade. MD	
72d Communications Squadron		Tinker AFB OK	Formerly 654th Communications-Computer Systems Gp, 1994–present
78th Communications Squadron		Robins AFB, GA	
81st Communications Squadron		Keesler AFB	1949–1958, 1991–1993, 1993–present. See 81st Training Wing
82d Communications Squadron		Sheppard Air Force Base	1947–1949, consolidated with 1922d Communications Squadron 1991–present. See 82d Training Wing
83d Communications Squadron		Seymour Johnson AFB Langley AFB	1956–1957 1997–2007. Redesignated 83d Network Operations Sq
84th Communications Squadron	Mitchel AFB McGuire AFB	1949–1951	
85th Communications Squadron	Erding AB	1949–1951. Redesignated 85th Operations Sq	
86th Communications Squadron		Ramstein Air Base, Ramstein Germany	See 86th Airlift Wing
87th Communications Squadron		McGuire AFB	
88th Communications Squadron		Wright-Patterson AFB	
89th Communications Squadron		Andrews AFB	See 89th Airlift Wing
90th Communications Squadron		FE Warren AFB	See 90th Missile Wing
92d Communications Squadron		Fairchild AFB, Washington	1948–1951, 1952, 1991–present Consolidated with 2039th Comm Sq.
94th Communications Squadron			
95th Communications Squadron			
96th Communications Squadron		Eglin AFB FL	Formerly 1993d Comm Sq. 1991–1993, 1994–present See 96th Test Wing
97th Communications Squadron		Altus AFB	See 97th Air Mobility Wing
99th Communications Squadron		Nellis AFB	See 99th Air Base Wing
100th Communications Squadron		RAF Mildenhall	
111th Communications Squadron		Horsham Air Guard Station, Horsham, PA	
118th Communications Squadron		Berry Field Memphis MAP Shaw AFB Rosecrans MAP Badin ANGB	Feb 1951 – Jan 1953, Jan 1953 – Dec 1959, Mar 1989 – Jun 1993 redesignated 118th Combat Comm Sq
123d Communications Squadron			
127th Communications Squadron			
134th Communications Squadron		McGhee Tyson Air National Guard Base	
142d Communications Squadron		Portland Air National Guard Base	Formerly 142d Communications Flight, -2023
193d Communications Squadron			
305th Communications Squadron		Grissom AFB McGuire AFB	consolidated with 1915 Comm Sq, 1991–present
314th Communications Squadron	Sewart AFB Little Rock AFB	1948–1957, consolidated with 2151 Comm Sq, 1991–2008	
315th Communications Squadron		Brady AB Charleston AFB	1952–1955, 1987–present consolidated with 315th Comm Flight 1987
319th Communications Squadron		Reading Municipal Airport Birmingham Municipal Airport Grand Forks AFB	1949, 1949–1951, 1955–1957, 1991–present, consolidated 1991 with 2152d Comm Sq
325th Communications Squadron		Hamilton AFB Moses Lake AFB McChord AFB Tyndall AFB	1948–1952, 1991–present
341st Communications Squadron		Malmstrom AFB	1962–1977, 1991–present
343d Communications Squadron		Eielson AFB, Alaska	1991–1993, Formerly 1995th Comm Sq
347th Communications Squadron		Itazuke AB Bofu AB Ashiya AB Naha AB, Japan Moody AFB, GA	1948–1950, 1991–2006. Inactivated
354th Communications Squadron		Myrtle Beach AFB Eielson AFB	Consolidated with 2066 Comm Sq See 354th Fighter Wing
355th Communications Squadron		Davis Monthan AFB	See 355th Fighter Wing
366th Communications Squadron		Mountain Home AFB	See 366th Fighter Wing
374th Communications Squadron		Yokota AB	Activated 1 April 1992; previously designated as the 1956th Communications Group
379th Communications Squadron		Wurtsmith AFB, Michigan	1991–1993, Was 2030th Comm Sq, redesignated 379th Exped Comm Sq.
380th Communications Squadron		Plattsburgh AFB, New York	1991–1995, Formerly 2042d Comm Sq, redesignated 380th Expeditionary Comm Sq.
384th Communications Squadron		McConnell AFB, Kansas	1991–1994, formerly 2155th Comm Sq
390th Communications Squadron		Davis–Monthan AFB, NM	1976–1984 Redesignated 390th Info Systems Sq.
391st Communications Squadron		Goodfellow AFB, Texas	Was 3480th Comm Sq, 1992–1993
394th Communications Squadron		Lackland AFB, Texas	Was 3700th Communications Sq, Sep 1992 – Jul 1993
396th Communications Squadron		Sheppard AFB, Texas	1992–1993, Formerly 3750th Comm Sq
401st Communications Squadron		Torrejon AB, Spain Aviano AB, Italy	1991–1994. Was 2186th Comm Sq. Redesignated 401st Expeditionary Comm Sq.
403d Communications Squadron		Portland MAP, OR Ashiya AB, Japan, Selfridge AFB, MI, Keesler AFB, MS	Jun 1949 – Apr 1959, Feb 1987 – Aug 1992 Consolidated with 403d Comm Flt. Redesignated 403d Comm Flt.
405th Communications Squadron		Langley AFB, VA	Apr 1953 – Oct 1957 Redesignated 405th Expeditionary Comm Sq.
406th Communications Squadron		RAF Manston England Zaragoza AB, Spain	1952–1956, redesignated 406th Operations Sq, Consolidated with 1986th Comm Sq, 1991–1992. Redesignated 406th Expeditionary Comm Sq
410th Communications Squadron		K. I. Sawyer AFB, Michigan	Was 2001st Comm Sq. 1991–1995
412th Communications Squadron		Edwards AFB, California	2012–present.
416th Communications Squadron		Griffiss AFB, NY	Sep 1991 – Jun 1995 Was 2019th Comm Sq.
422d Communications Squadron		RAF Croughton	
423d Communications Squadron		RAF Alconbury	See 423d Air Base Group
432d Communications Squadron		Misawa AB	Formerly 2114 Comm Sq, 1991–1994
435th Communications Squadron			See 435th Air Ground Operations Wing
436th Communications Squadron		Dover AFB	See 436th Airlift Wing
437th Communications Squadron		Charleston AFB	April 1991–
439th Communications Squadron			See 439th Airlift Wing
442d Communications Squadron		Olathe NAS Richards-Gebaur AFB	1949–1951, 1952–1959, c. 1987–1992 consolidated with 442d Comm Flt, redesignated 442d Comm Flt
460th Communications Squadron			Redesignated 460th Space Communications Squadron
482d Communications Squadron			See 482d Fighter Wing
483d Communications Squadron	Ashiya AB, Japan	Jan 53 – Jun 60	
485th Communications Squadron, Air Force	High Wycombe AS, United Kingdom		
502d Communications Squadron		Maxwell AFB AL Ft Sam Houston TX	Formerly 1973d Comm Gp, 1992–1994, 2010–present
505th Communications Squadron			See 505th Command and Control Wing
507th Communications Squadron		Tinker AFB, OK	Feb 87 – Aug 92 Was 507th Comm Flight, redesignated 507th Comm Flt
509th Communications Squadron		Walker AFB NM, Whiteman AFB MO	Aug 48 – Feb 51, Feb–Aug 52, Jul 93-present See 509th Bomb Wing
512th Communications Squadron		Reading Airport, New Castle County Airport, Willow Grove NAS, Dover AFB	Sep 49 – Apr 51, Jun 52 – Apr 59
513th Communications Squadron		RAF Fassburg, RAF Mildenhall	Biv 48 – Sep 49, May 91 – Jan 92 consolidated with 2176th Comm Sq
514th Communications Squadron		Birmingham MAP, AL Mitchel AFB NY, McGuire AFB, NJ	Jun 49 – Feb 53, Apr 53 – Apr 59, Feb 87 – Aug 92, Mar 95 – Oct 97 consolidated with 514th Comm Flight and 514th Operations Sq
516th Communications Squadron		Memphis MAP, TN	Jun 49 – Jan 53
542d Communications Squadron		Kirtland AFB, New Mexico	1991–1993, formerly 1960th Comm Sq.
554th Communications Squadron		Nellis AFB, NV	Oct 91 – Oct 95 Was 554th Comm Group
561st Communications Squadron		Peterson AFB, CO	Jul 06 – Jul 07 Was 2161st Comm Sq, redesignated 561st Network Operations Sq
580th Communications Squadron		Mountain Home AFB, ID Wheelus AB Libya	Apr 51 – Sep 53
581st Communications Squadron		Mountain Home AFB, ID Clark AB Philippines	Oct 51 – Sep 53
582d Communications Squadron		Mountain Home AFB, ID Great Falls AFB MT	Sep 51 – Aug 53 redesignated 482d Operations Sq
583d Communications Squadron		Hahn AB Germany	Oct 91 – Sep 93
603d Communications Squadron		RAF Sculthorpe, RAF South Ruislip, UK Elmendorf AFB, AK	1954–1962, 1991–1992, Formerly 3d Communications Squadron, Operations. Also 603d Communications Squadron, Operations. Consolidated with 1930 Comm Sq 15 Sep 91, redesignated 603d Air Communications Flight.
604th Communications Squadron	|	Ramstein AB, Germany	c. 1953–1962.
607th Communications Squadron, Operations		Taegu AB, osan AB, Camp Humphreys, Korea Gifu Aux Airfield, Japan	1953–1956, 1991–1992, Formerly 7th Communications Squadron, Operations. Redesignated 607th Air Communications Squadron.
619th Communications Squadron		RAF Uxbridge, United Kingdom	1992–1994. Formerly 2119th Comm Sq
620th Communications Squadron		RAF Upper Heyford, United Kingdom	1991–1994, formerly 2168th Comm Sq
628th Communications Squadron		Joint Base Charleston	
630th Communications Squadron		RAF Croughton	1992 – Aug 1996, was 2130 Comm Gp
633d Communications Squadron		Langley AFB	See 633d Air Base Wing
647th Communications Squadron		Laughlin AFB, TX	1991–1994. Formerly 2108th Communications Squadron. Redesignated 47th Communications Squadron.
651st Communications Squadron, Operations		Shaw AFB, SC	1954–1964. Formerly 51st Communications Squadron, Operations.
657th Communications Squadron, Air Force	Donaldson AFB, SC	1954–1963. Formerly 57th Communications Squadron, Operations. Also 657th Communications Squadron, Operations,	
673d Communications Squadron		Joint Base Elmendorf–Richardson, AK	2010–present. Formerly the 1979th Comm Sq.
704th Communications Squadron		Arnold AFB, TN	
707th Communications Squadron		Fort Meade, MD	Formerly 1970th Comm Sq, 2009–present
721st Communications Squadron		Cheyenne Mountain Complex, Colorado	Former 47th Communications Group. 1992-1994 721 Space Communications Squadron
735th Communications Squadron		Ramstein AB, Germany	See 435th Air Base Wing
744th Communications Squadron		Andrews AFB	Was 2189th Comm Sq. 2006–present
747th Communications Squadron		Joint Base Pearl Harbor–Hickam, HI	2010–present. Formerly 15th Communications Squadron and 747th Cyberspace Squadron.
750th Communications Squadron	Onizuka AFS, CA	1992–1999. Formed by consolidation of 50th Communications Squadron, Air Force and 1999th Communications Squadron.	
752d Communications Squadron		Tinker AFB, OK	2003–2009. Was 752d Computer Systems Squadron.
755th Communications Squadron		Offutt AFB, NE	
762d Communications Squadron		Boerfink CS, Germany	Was 2062d Communications Sq. 1992 – Dec 1993
774th Communications Squadron	RAF Chicksands, England	Was 7274th Communications Sq. Aug 1993 – Sep 1995	
775th Communications Squadron	San Vito dei Normanni AS, Italy	Was 7275th Communications Sq. Aug 1993 – Aug 1994	
786th Communications Squadron			See 86th Airlift Wing
794th Communications Squadron		Joint Base Anacostia–Bolling, DC	2020–present
789th Communications Squadron		Andrews AFB, MD	Inactivated on 7 June 2006 and replaced by 744th Communications Squadron.
802d Communications Squadron		Lackland AFB, TX	Was 2162 Comm Sq. 2010–present
834th Communications Squadron		Hurlburt Field, Florida	1991–1993, Former 2068 Comm Sq
835th Communications Squadron		Scott Air Force Base, IL	See 435th Air Base Wing
836th Communications Squadron		Davis–Monthan AFB, AZ	1991–1992. Formerly 1903d Communications Squadron.
844th Communications Squadron		The Pentagon	2006–Present. Formerly 1813th Communications Squadron.
868th Communications Squadron		Scott AFB	
902d Communications Squadron		Randolph AFB	See 502d Air Base Wing
907th Communications Squadron		Rickenbacker ANGB	Reserve Feb 1987 – Aug 1992 was 907th Info Sys Sq, to 907th Comm Flt
908th Communications Squadron		Maxwell AFB	Reserve Feb 1987 – Aug 1992 was 908th Info Sys Sq, to 908th Comm Flt
910th Communications Squadron		Youngstown Air Reserve Station	Reserve, Feb 1987 – Jan 1992 Was 910th Info Sys Sq, to 910th Comm Flt, Jan 2012, was 910th Comm Flt
914th Communications Squadron		Niagara Falls Air Reserve Station	See 914th Airlift Wing
916th Communications Squadron		Seymour Johnson AFB	Reserve; see 916th Air Refueling Wing
928th Communications Squadron		O'Hare ARS	Reserve Feb 1987 – Aug 1992; Was 928th Info Systems Sq, to 928th Comm Flt see 928th Airlift Wing

=== Four-digit major command-controlled units ===
==== Communications squadrons ====
Squadron	Emblem	Location	Note
1050th Communications Squadron		Bolling AFB, DC	1949–1949. Discontinued.
1100th Communications Squadron		Bolling AFB, DC	1993–1994. Inactivated.
1225th Communications Squadron		Pepperrell AFB	1948–1949. Formerly Squadron A, 535th Air Base Group. Discontinued.
1500th Communications Squadron		Hickam AFB, HI	1949–1953. Discontinued.
1501st Communications Squadron		Fairfield-Suisun AFB, CA	1948–1949. Formerly Squadron A, 530th Air Base Group.
1600th Communications Squadron		Westover AFB, MA	1948–1954. Formerly Squadron A, 520th Air Base Group. Redesignated 1600th Operations Squadron.
1605th Communications Squadron		Lajes AB, Azores	1991–1992. Formerly 1936th Communications Squadron. Redesignated 65th Communications Squadron.
1701st Communications Squadron		Great Falls AFB, MT	1948–1949. Formerly Squadron A, 517th Air Base Group. Discontinued.
1802d Communications Squadron		Bolling AFB, DC	1986-c. 1990. Formerly 1802d Information Systems Squadron. Inactivated.
1810th Communications Squadron		Los Angeles AFB, CA	1991–1992. Formerly 1810th Communications Group. Inactivated.
1811th Communications Squadron		The Pentagon, Fairfax, VA	1991–1992. Formerly 1811th Communications Group. Inactivated.
1812th Communications Squadron		Onizuka AFS, CA	1986–1992. Formerly 1812th Command and Control Squadron. Inactivated.
1813th Communications Squadron		Norton AFB, CA	1988–1991. Redesignated 844th Communications Squadron.
1814th Communications Squadron		Fort Myer, VA	1973–ca 1991. Formerly 1814th Support Squadron. Inactivated.
1822d Communications Squadron		Andrews AFB, MD	1990–1992. Inactivated.
1876th Communications Squadron		Tan Son Nhut AB, Viet Nam USAF Academy, CO	1965–1985. Redesignated 1876th Information Systems Support Group.
1877th Communications Squadron		Bien Hoa AB, Viet Nam Holloman AFB, NM	1964–1991 Consolidated with 49th Communications Squadron.
1878th Communications Squadron		Pleiku AB, Viet Nam Little Rock AFB, AR Moody AFB GA	1965–1991. Consolidated with 347th Communications Squadron.
1879th Communications Squadron		Nha Trang Air Base, Viet Nam Richards-Gebaur AFB, MO Schriever AFB CO	1965–1989. Redesignated 1879th Communications Group. From 2004 to 2020 became 50th Network Operations Group, which then became a Delta of the United States Space Force.
1880th Communications Squadron		Binh Thuy AB, Viet Nam	1965–1971. Discontinued.
1880th Communications Squadron		Tonopah Test Range, NV	1981–1991. Consolidated with 37th Communications Squadron.
1881st Communications Squadron	Cam Ranh AB, Viet Nam Hill AFB, UT	1965–1991. Redesignated 1881 Communications-Computer Systems Group. Currently 75th Communications Squadron,	
1882d Communications Squadron		Phan Rang AB, Viet Nam Bergstrom AFB, TX	1965–1991. Consolidated with 67th Communications Squadron.
1883d Communications Squadron		Qui Nhon Airport Phu Cat AB, Viet Nam Kincheloe AFB, MI Beale AFB, CA	1965–1991.
1884th Communications Squadron	Tuy Hoa AB, Viet Nam	1966–1971	
1890th Communications Squadron	Mactan Island AB, Philippines	1967–1969. Discontinued,	
1891st Communications Squadron	Wheeler AFB, Hawaii	AFCS / AFCC, Inactive	
1900th Communications Squadron	Biggs AFB, TX	1961–1962. Formerly 1900th AACS Squadron.	
1901st Communications Squadron	Travis AFB, CA	1961–1981. Formerly 1901st AACS Squadron. Redesignated 1901st Communications Group. Most recently 60th Communications Group.	
1902d Communications Squadron	Hamilton AFB, CA	1961–1975. Formerly 1902d AACS Squadron.	
1903d Communications Squadron		Davis–Monthan AFB, AZ	Was 1903d AACS Squadron, Jul 1961 – Apr 1991. Redesignated 836th Communications Squadron.
1904th Communications Squadron		Malmstrom AFB, MT	1961–1976. Formerly 1904th AACS Squadron. Assets to 341st Communications Squadron. Inactive.
1905th Communications Squadron	McChord AFB, WA	1961–1991. Inactive.	
1906th Communications Squadron	Hill AFB, Utah	Was 1906th AACS Squadron. Jul 1961 – Jul 1976. Assets to 1881st Communications Squadron.	
1907th Communications Squadron	March AFB, California	1961–1976. Formerly 1907th AACS Squadron. Discontinued and assets transferred to 33d Communications Group.	
1908th Communications Squadron		England AFB, LA	1961–1991. Formerly 1908th AACS Squadron, 1961–1991, Consolidated with 23d Communications Squadron.
1909th Communications Squadron	Andrews AFB, Maryland	Apr 1962 – Jul 1968. Base communications separated from 2045th Communications Squadron, then returned	
1910th Communications Squadron	Lowry AFB, CO	1961–1975. Was 1910th AACS Squadron. Inactive.	
1911th Communications Squadron	Offutt AFB, Nebraska	Was 1911th AACS Squadron. July 1961 – July 1976	
1911th Communications Squadron		Langley AFB, VA	Was 1911th Information Systems Sq, Nov 1986 – May 1991
1912th Communications Squadron	Olmstead AFB, Pennsylvania	AFCS / AFCC, Inactive	
1913th Communications Squadron	Langley AFB, VA	AFCS / AFCC, Inactive	
1914th Communications Squadron	Holloman AFB, New Mexico	Oct 1962 – Dec 1971, Inactive	
1915th Communications Squadron		Grissom AFB, Indiana	1961–1991, formerly 1915 AACS Sq, consolidated with 305th Comm Sq
1916th Communications Squadron		Pease AFB, New Hampshire	Oct 1962-c. March 1991
1917th Communications Squadron	Westover AFB, Massachusetts	AFCS / AFCC, Inactive	
1918th Communications Squadron	Scott AFB, Illinois	AFCS / AFCC, Inactive	
1919th Communications Squadron	Brookley AFB, Alabama	AFCS / AFCC, Inactive	
1920th Communications Squadron	Eglin AFB, Florida	1961–1973 Was 1920th AACS Sq, inactive	
1921st Communications Squadron	Glasgow AFB, Montana	Oct 1962 – Jun 1968	
1921st Communications Squadron		Lackland AFB, Texas	Was 1921st Info Systems Squadron, Nov 1985 – Apr 1991 redesignated 3700th Communications Sq
1922d Communications Squadron		Williams AFB, Arizona	Jul 1963 – Apr 1991, consolidated with 82d Comm Sq
1923d Communications Squadron	Kelly AFB, Texas	Redesignated 1923d Communications Group 1 October 1972 AFCS / AFCC	
1924th Communications Squadron	Little Rock AFB, Arkansas	AFCS / AFCC, Inactive	
1925th Communications Squadron		Edwards AFB, California	Formerly 1925 AACS Sq, 1961–1991, inactive
1926th Communications Squadron		Robins AFB, Georgia	1961–1990, Formerly 1926 AACS Sq, redesignated 1926th Communications-Computer Group
1927th Communications Squadron	Barksdale AFB, Louisiana	Redesignated from 154th Air & Airways Communications Squadron, AFCS activated: 1 June 1948; inactivated on 1 July 1976 AFCS Inactive	
1928th Communications Squadron	MacDill AFB, Florida	Redesignated 1928th Communications Group 1 July 1967 AFCS / AFCC, Inactive	
1929th Airways & Air Communications Service Squadron	Davis Air Force Base, Alaska	AACS, inactive	
1929th Airways & Air Communications Service Squadron	Adak AB, Alaska	AACS, inactive	
1930th Communications Squadron	Elmendorf AFB, Alaska	1962–1971	
1930th Communications Squadron		Elmendorf AFB, Alaska	Was 1930th Information Systems Sq, Nov 1986 – Sep 1991, consolidated with 603d Comm Sq
1931st Communications Wing	Elmendorf AFB, Alaska	AFCS / AFCC, Inactive	
1932d Communications Squadron	RCAF Goose Bay, Canada	AFCC, Inactive	
1933d Communications Squadron	Ernest Harmon AB, Canada	AFCS / AFCC, Inactive	
1934th Communications Squadron	Kindley AFB, Bermuda	AFCS / AFCC, Inactive	
1935th Communications Squadron	Wildwood AFS (Kenai), Alaska	AFCS, Inactive	
1936th Communications Squadron	Lajes AB, Azores	1961–1991. Formerly 1936th AACS Squadron. Redesignated 1605th Communications Squadron.	
1937th Communications Squadron	Albrook_AFB, CZ		
1937th Communications Squadron	Beale AFB, California	Activated: 1 Jan 1966 – Inactivated: 1 Jul 1976 AFCS, Inactive	
1937th Airways & Air Communications Squadron, Detachment 6	Managua, Nicaragua	AACS, Inactive	
1938th Communications Squadron	Ramey AFB, Puerto Rico	AFCS / AFCC, Inactive	
1939th Airways & Air Communications Squadron	Vernam, Jamaica	AACS, Inactive	
1940th Communications Squadron	Coolidge AB, Antigua	AFCS, Inactive	
1942d Communications Squadron	Homestead AFB, FL	1961–1991. Formerly 1942d AACS Squadron. Consolidated with 31st Communications Squadron.	
1943d Communications Squadron		Pope AFB, NC	Was 1943 AACS Sq, 1961–1991
1945th Communications Squadron	Rhein-Main AB, Germany	Redesignated 1945th Communications Group 1 January 1973 AFCS / AFCC,	
1946th Communications Squadron		Tempelhof Central Airport, West Berlin	Formerly 1946 AACS Sq, 1961-c. 1992
1947th Communications Squadron	Wiesbaden AB, Germany	AFCS / AFCC, Inactive	
1948th Communications Squadron		Columbus AFB, Mississippi	1961–1991, Was 1948th AACS Sq. Consolidated with 14th Communications Squadron.
1950th Communications Squadron	Wheelus AB, Libya	AFCS Inactive	
1952d Communications Squadron	Toul-Rosieres AB, France	AFCS / AFCC, Inactive	
1952d Communications Squadron, Detachment 5	Saint-Mihiel Ammo Storage Station, France	AFCS / AFCC, Inactive	
1953d Communications Squadron	Misawa AB, Japan	AFCS / AFCC. Activated on 1 July 1961. Inactivated on 30 June 1975.	
1954th Communications Squadron	Denver, Colorado	AFCS / AFCC, Inactive	
1955th Communications Squadron	Itazuke AB, Japan	AFCS / AFCC, Inactive	
1958th Communications Squadron		Andersen AFB, Guam Reese AFB TX	Formerly 1958th AACS Sq, 1961–1986
1960th Communications Squadron		Kirtland AFB, New Mexico	1996-1991, redesignated 542d Comm Sq.
1962d Communications Squadron	Kadena AB, Japan	Redesignated from 1962d Communications Group on 15 Jan 1975. Redesignated to group level again on 28 Feb 1977. Inactivated and replaced by 18th Communications Squadron (18th Wing) in Oct 1991.	
1963d Communications Squadron		Chanute AFB, Illinois	was 1963d AACS Sq, redesignated 3345 Comm Sq, Inactive
1964th Communications Squadron	Tan Son Nhut AB, Viet Nam	Activated on 1 May 1962; redesignated 1964th Communications Group AFCS on 1 October 1962. Relocated to Ramstein AB on 27 March 1973; still serving there in 1993.	
1965th Communications Squadron		Don Maung AP, Thailand Norton AFB, CA	1964–1977, 1980–1991. 1965 Communications Installation Group 1977–1980. Consolidated with 63d Communications Squadron.
1966th Communications Squadron	Minot AFB North Dakota	AFCS / AFCC, Inactive	
1967th Communications Squadron	Camp Drake, Japan, Camp Zama, Japan	AFCS. Activated on 1 Jul 1961. Inactivated and assets absorbed by 1956th Communications Group on 31 Jul 1974.	
1968th Communications Squadron		Charleston AFB, South Carolina	July 1961 – April 1992, was 1968 AACS Sq
1969th Communications Squadron	RAF South Ruislip, United Kingdom	AFCS, Inactivated June 1972	
1970th Communications Squadron	RAF Brize Norton, United Kingdom	Was 1970 AACS Sq, 1961– ?	
1970th Communications Squadron		RAAF Woomera, Australia	1979–1991, redesignated 707th Comm Sq
1972d Communications Squadron	Da Nang AB, Viet Nam	Activated: 20 Aug 1965 Relocated to: Eglin AFB on 13 Mar 1973	
1972d Communications Squadron	Eglin AFB, Florida	AFCS / AFCC, Inactive	
1973d Communications Squadron		Udorn RTAFB, Thailand Maxwell AFB AL	1965–1985 redesignated 1973d Information Systems Gp
1973rd Communications Squadron	Maxwell AFB, Alabama	AFCS / AFCC, Inactive	
1974th Communications Squadron	Udorn RTAFB, Thailand	Activated: 1 Nov 1965 at Korat AB as the 1974th Communications Group Relocated to: Udorn AB and Redesignated as the 1974th Communications Squadron on 1 Jan 1976, Redesignated as the 1974th Communications Group and, Relocated to Scott AFB on 22 Mar 1976	
1975th Communications Squadron	Sidi Slimane AB, Morocco	AFCS / AFCC, Inactive	
1976th Communications Squadron	Albrook_AFB, CZ	AFCS, Inactive	
1978th Communications Squadron	Albrook_AFB, CZ	Redesignated: as the 1978th Communications Group AFCS / AFCC, Inactive	
1978th Communications Squadron	Howard AFB, Panama	AFCS / AFCC, Inactive	
1979th Communications Squadron		RAF Lakenheath, United Kingdom	Formerly 1979 AACS, later Communications Sq, 1961–1991. Detachment 3 at RAF Sculthorpe, United Kingdom. Redesignated 673d Comm Sq and activated 2010.
1980th Communications Squadron	Takhli RTAFB, Thailand	AFCS 1965–1970 (closed and assets transferred to 1973rd Comm. Sq. 11/1970)	
1981st Communications Squadron	Nouasseur AB, Morocco	AFCS / AFCC, Inactive	
1982d Communications Squadron		Ubon RTAFB, Thailand, Kunsan AB	1965–1992. Consolidated with 8th Communications Squadron.
1983d Communications Squadron	Glasgow AFB, Montana	AFCS / AFCC, Inactive	
1984th Communications Squadron	Tinker AFB, Oklahoma	was 1984 AACS Squadron, Jul 1961 – Jul 1976	
1984th Communications Squadron		Holloman AFB, New Mexico	c. 1984 – Nov 1986 redesignated 1984th Information Systems Sq
1985th Communications Squadron		U-Tapao AB, Thailand Tinker AFB OK	Apr 1966–1990, redesignated 1985th Communications-Computer Systems Gp
1986th Communications Squadron		Zaragoza AB, Spain	Jan 1971– May 1991. Consolidated with 406th Communications Sq
1987th Communications Squadron		Nakhon Phanom RTNAF, Thailand; Lowry AFB, Colorado	June 1966 – April 1991, then redesignated 3514th Comm Sq; inactivated on 28 June 1994.
1988th Communications Squadron	Waco, Texas	Jan 1963 – Sep 1968	
1989th Communications Squadron	Torrejon AB, Spain	AFCS / AFCC, Inactive	
1990th Communications Squadron	Wueschheim AB, Germany	Oct 1990 – Apr 1992	
1991st Communications Squadron	Whiteman AFB, Missouri	AFCS / AFCC, Inactive	
1992d Communications Squadron	Chateauroux Air Base, France	1961– . Formerly 1992 AACS Squadron.	
1992d Communications Squadron	Camp New Amsterdam, Netherlands	1990–1991. Consolidated with 32d Communications Squadron.	
1993d Communications Squadron		Dyess AFB, Texas	1966–1991, redesignated 96th Comm Sq
1994th Communications Squadron	Laon AB, France	AFCS / AFCC, Inactive	
1995th Communications Squadron		Eielson AFB, Alaska	1961–1991, Formerly 1995 AACS Sq, redesignated 343d Comm Sq
1998th Communications Squadron	Korat RTAFB, Thailand	AFCS / AFCC, Inactive	
1999th Communications Squadron	Sewart AFB, TN	AFCS / AFCC, Inactive	
1999th Communications Squadron		Onizuka AFS, CA	1981–1992. Consolidated with 50th Communications Squadron, Air Force as 750th Communications Squadron,
2000th Communications Squadron	Stewart AFB, New York	AFCS / AFCC, Was 2000th AACS Sq, Inactive	
2001st Communications Squadron		K I Sawyer AFB, Michigan	Was 2001st AACS Sq. 1961–1991, Redesignated 410th Comm Sq
2002d Communications Squadron	Altus AFB, Oklahoma	AFCS / AFCC, Was 2002d AACS Sq, Inactive	
2003d Communications Squadron	Ankara AS, Turkey	AFCC, 1987, redesignated 2003 Comm Gp	
2004th Communications Squadron		Sondrestrom AB, Greenland	1961–1990, Was 2004th AACS Sq
2005th Communications Squadron	Siegelsbach CS Germany	AFCS / AFCC, Was 2005th AACS Sq, Inactive	
2006th Communications Squadron	Adana AB, Renamed: Incirlik AS	AFCS/AFCC, was 2006th AACS Sq, 1962–1992, redesignated 39 Comm Sq	
2007th Communications Squadron	McConnell AFB, Kansas	AFCS / AFCC, Was 2007th AACS Sq, Inactive	
2008th Communications Squadron	Peshawar AS, Pakistan	AFCS / AFCC, Was 2008th AACS Sq, Inactive	
2009th Communications Squadron	Richards-Gebaur AFB, Missouri	AFCS / AFCC, Was 2009th AACS Sq, Inactive	
2010th Communications Squadron	Walker AFB, New Mexico	AFCS / AFCC, Was 2010th AACS Sq, Inactive	
2011th Communications Squadron	Istanbul, Turkey	AFCS, 1965–1968	
2012th Communications Squadron		Seymour Johnson AFB, North Carolina	1962–1992
2013th Communications Squadron	Bergstrom AFB, Texas	Activated: 1 Nov 1954 Inactivated: 31 Mar 1972 AACS/AFCS, Was 2013th AACS Sq,	
2014th Communications Squadron		L G Hanscom Fld, Massachusetts	AFCS/AFCC, 1962–1990
2015th Communications Squadron	Randolph AFB, Texas	1961–1976, was 2015th AACS Sq	
2015th Communications Squadron		Randolph AFB, Texas	1977–1986
2016th Communications Squadron	(1982) (1986)	Dover AFB, Delaware	1961–1991, Was 2016th AACS Sq,
2017th Communications Squadron	McGuire AFB, New Jersey	AFCS / AFCC, Was 2017th AACS Sq,	
2018th Communications Squadron	Otis AFB, Massachusetts	AFCS / AFCC, Was 2018th AACS Sq,	
2019th Communications Squadron	Griffiss AFB, New York	AFCC, 1970–1991 Redesignated 416th Comm Sq	
2020th Communications Squadron		Shaw AFB, South Carolina	1961–1991, was 2020th AACS Sq and 2020th Information Systems Squadron. Replaced by 363 CS.
2021st Communications Squadron		Tyndall AFB, Florida	Was 2021st AACS Sq, 1961–1991
2022d Communications Squadron	Craig AFB, Alabama	AFCS / AFCC, Was 2022d AACS Sq,	
2023d Communications Squadron	Turner AFB, Georgia	AFCS / AFCC, Was 2023d AACS Sq,	
2024th Communications Squadron	Moody AFB, South Carolina	AFCS / AFCC, Was 2024th AACS Sq	
2025th Communications Squadron	Hunter AFB, Georgia	AFCS / AFCC, Was 2025th AACS Sq	
2026th Communications Squadron	Grand Forks AFB, North Dakota	Was 2026th AACS Sq, 1961–1976	
2026th Communications Squadron		Scott AFB, Illinois	Was 2026th Info Systems Support Sq 1986–1989
2027th Communications Squadron	Forbes AFB, Kansas	AFCS / AFCC, Was 2027th AACS Sq	
2028th Communications Squadron	Schilling AFB, Kansas	AFCS / AFCC, Was 2028th AACS Sq	
2029th Communications Squadron	Ellsworth AFB, South Dakota	AFCS / AFCC, Was 2029th AACS Sq	
2030th Communications Squadron		Wurtsmith AFB, Michigan	1961–1991, Was 2030th AACS Sq, redesignated 379th Comm Sq.
2031st Communications Squadron		Selfridge AFB, Michigan	Was 2031st AACS Sq, 1961–1992
2032d Communications Squadron	Lockbourne AFB, Ohio	AFCS / AFCC, Was 2032d AACS Sq, Inactive	
2033d Communications Squadron	McClellan AFB, California	AFCS, 1962–1967	
2033d Communications Squadron	Fort Belvoir, Virginia	AFCS/AFCC, 1978–1992	
2034th Communications Squadron	Mather AFB, California	AFCS / AFCC, Was 2034th AACS Sq, Inactive	
2035th Communications Squadron		Castle AFB, California	1961–1991, Was 2035th AACS Sq, Consolidated with 93d Comm Sq
2036th Communications Squadron		Mountain Home AFB, Idaho	Formerly 2036th AACS Sq, 1961–1991
2037th Communications Squadron	Luke AFB, Arizona	AFCS / AFCC, Was 2037th AACS Sq, Inactive	
2038th Communications Squadron	Larson AFB, Washington	AFCS / AFCC, Was 2038th AACS Sq, Inactive	
2039th Communications Squadron		Fairchild AFB, Washington	Was 2039th AACS Sq, 1961–1991. Consolidated with 92d Comm Sq.
2040th Communications Squadron		Cannon AFB, NM	1961–1991. Consolidated with 27th Communications Squadron.
2042d Communications Squadron		Plattsburgh AFB, New York	1961–1991, Formerly 2042d AACS Sq, redesignated 380th Comm Sq.
2043d Communications Squadron	Suffolk County AFB, New York	AFCS / AFCC, Was 2043d AACS Sq, Inactive	
2044th Communications Squadron	The Pentagon, Virginia	AFCS / AFCC, Was 2044th AACS Sq, Inactive	
2046th Communications Squadron	Wright-Patterson AFB, Ohio	AFCS / AFCC, Was 2046th AACS Sq, Inactive	
2047th Communications Squadron	Maxwell AFB, Alabama	AFCS / AFCC, Was 2047th AACS Sq, Inactive	
2048th Communications Squadron		Carswell AFB, Texas	was 2048th Airways & Air Communications Squadron AFCS / AFCC, Inactive
2050th Communications Squadron	Webb AFB, Texas	AFCS, 1965–1977	
2051st Communications Squadron	Amarillo AFB, Texas	AFCS, 1965–1968	
2052d Communications Squadron		Keesler AFB, Mississippi	AFCS/AFCC, 1962–1992, redesignated 3380th Comm Sq
2053d Communications Squadron	Reese AFB, Texas	AFCS, 1963–1976	
2054th Communications Squadron		Sheppard AFB, Texas	1962–1992, redesignated 3750th Comm Sq
2055th Communications Squadron	Vandenberg AFB, California	Jan 1966 – Jul 1976	
2056th Communications Squadron	Kelly AFB, Texas	Apr 1963 – Oct 1969	
2061st Communications Squadron	Kindsbach CS, Germany	January 1962 – July 1965	
2062d Communications Squadron		Boerfink CS, Germany	Was 2062d Information Systems Sq. Nov 1986–1992 Redesignated 762d Communications Sq.
2063rd Communications Squadron	Lindsey AS,	AFCS/AFCC, 1962–1990 redesignated 7001 Comm Sq	
2064th Communications Squadron		Shemya AFB, Alaska	July 1967 – January 1992
2065th Communications Squadron	Brooks AFB, Texas	Activated: 1 Jun 1968 Inactivated: 1 Nov 1976	
2066th Communications Squadron		Myrtle Beach AFB, SC	AFCS/AFCC, 1963–1991 Consolidated with 354th Comm Sq
2067th Communications Squadron	George AFB, CA	1963–1991. Consolidated with 35th Communications Squadron.	
2068th Communications Squadron		Hurlburt Field, Florida	AFCS/AFCC, 1963–1991 Redesignated 834th Comm Sq
2069th Communications Squadron		Nellis AFB, Nevada	AFCS/AFCC, 1963–1986 Redesignated 2069th Information Systems Group.
2074th Communications Squadron	Osan AB, South Korea	AFCS. 1968–1972	
2075th Communications Squadron	Kunsan AB, South Korea	AFCS. 1968– Inactivated on 29 August 1974.	
2076th Communications Squadron	Kimpo AB, South Korea	AFCS. 1968–1971	
2077th Communications Squadron	Suwon AB, South Korea	AFCS. 1968–1972	
2078th Communications Squadron	Taegu AB, South Korea	AFCS, 1968–1974	
2078th Communications Squadron		Taegu AB, South Korea	1984–1990
2079th Communications Squadron	Kwang Ju AB, South Korea	AFCS, 1968–1975	
2080th Communications Squadron		Los Angeles AFS, California	AFCS/AFCC, 1969–1992
2081st Communications Squadron		Goodfellow AFB, Texas	AFCS/AFCC, 1969–1992 Redesignated 3480th Comm Sq
2082d Communications Squadron	Lackland AFB, Texas	AFCS, 1972–1976	
2083d Communications Squadron	Takhli RTAFB, Thailand	AFCS, 1972– Inactivated on 30 September 1974.	
2101st Communications Squadron		Blytheville AFB, Arkansas	Jan 1965 – Sep 91. Consolidated with 97th Communications Sq.
2102d Communications Squadron	Clinton-Sherman AFB, Oklahoma	Jan 1965 – Dec 1969	
2103d Communications Squadron	Ellington AFB; Texas	Jan 1965 – Sep 1976	
2104th Communications Squadron	Gentile AFS, Ohio	Jan 1965 – Jun 1977	
2105th Communications Squadron	James Connally AFB, Texas	Jan 1965 – Jan 1966	
2106th Communications Squadron	Lackland AFB, Texas	Jan 1965 – Oct 1970	
2107th Communications Squadron	Laredo AFB, Texas	Jan 1965 – Sep 1976	
2108th Communications Squadron		Laughlin AFB, TX	Jan 1965 – Apr 1991. Redesignated 647th Communications Squadron.
2109th Communications Squadron	Perrin AFB, Texas	Jan 1965 – Jun 1971	
2110th Communications Squadron	Vance AFB, Oklahoma	Jan 1965 – Apr 1991. Consolidated with 71st Communications Sq	
2111th Communications Squadron	Kelly AFB, Texas	Oct 1986 – Apr 1991	
2112th Communications Squadron	RAF Chicksands, England	Feb 1979 – May 1991. Redesignated 7274th Communications Sq.	
2113th Communications Squadron	San Vito dei Normanni AS, Italy	Feb 1979 – May 1991. Redesignated 7275th Communications Sq.	
2114th Communications Squadron		Misawa AB, Japan	Activated on 1 Feb 1979, with assignment to the 1956th Communications Group at Yokota Ab, Japan. Redesignated the 432d Communications Squadron in May 1991, and as the 35th Communications Squadron in Oct 1994.
2115th Communications Squadron		Iraklion AB, Greece	Feb 1979 – May 1991, redesignated 7276 Comm Sq
2119th Communications Squadron		RAF Uxbridge, United Kingdom	Jun 1979–1992. Redesignated 619th Communications Sq
2127th Communications Squadron	Yokota AB, Japan	AFCS / AFCC. Activated on 1 July 1961. Inactivated and assets absorbed by 1956th Communications Group on 30 September 1974.	
2128th Communications Squadron	Tainan AB, Taiwan	AFCS / AFCC. Inactivated on 31 October 1974.	
2129th Communications Squadron	Ching Chuan Kang AB, Taiwan	AFCS / AFCC, Inactive	
2130th Communications Squadron	RAF Croughton, United Kingdom	Jul 1961 – Feb 1980, was 1230th AACS Sq, redesignated 2130th Communications Group	
2130th Communications Squadron	RAF Croughton, United Kingdom	Jul 1983 – Oct 1988, redesignated 2130th Communications Group	
2132d Communications Squadron	Tachikawa AB, Japan	AFCS / AFCC, Inactive	
2134 Communications Squadron	Sembach AB, Germany	2005th Communications Wing, AFCS / AFCC, Inactive	
2135 Communications Squadron		Ramstein AB, Germany	Was 1235 AACS Sq, 1961–1973
2135 Communications Squadron		Florennes AB, Belgium	Was 2135 Info Systems Sq, Nov 1986 – Apr 1989
2137 Communications Squadron		Spangdahlem AB, Germany	1961–1991. Formerly 1237th AACS Squadron. Consolidated with 52d Communications Squadron.
2139 Communications Squadron		Bitburg AB, Germany	1962–1991. Consolidated with 36th Comm Sq.
2140th Communications Squadron	Athenai AP, Greece	AFCS / AFCC, Inactive	
2141st Communications Squadron	Cigli AS / İzmir, Turkey	1961–1970	
2141 Communications Squadron		Wueschheim AB, Germany	Was 2141 Information Systems Sq, Nov 1986 – Oct 1990
2142d Communications Squadron	Ankara AS, Turkey	Jul 1966 – Dec 1972	
2142d Communications Squadron		RAF Molesworth, England	Was 2142d Information Systems Sq. Nov 1986 – Jan 1989
2143 Communications Squadron	Zweibruecken AB, Germany	Dec 1969 – Jul 1991	
2144th Communications Squadron	Izmir AS, Turkey	Jan 1971 – Jul 1972	
2144th Communications Squadron	Woensdrecht AS, Netherlands	Oct 1986 – Sep 1988	
2145th Communications Squadron	RAF Sculthorpe, England	Was 1245th AACS Squadron. Jul 1961 – Aug 1962	
2146th Communications Group	Osan AB, South Korea	AFCS / AFCC, Inactive	
2147th Communications Squadron	RAF Mildenhall, United Kingdom	AFCS / AFCC, Inactive	
2148th Communications Squadron		Ellsworth AFB, SD	1977–1990 Redesignated 2148th Comm Gp.
2150th Communications Squadron		Minot AFB, North Dakota	1976–1991
2151st Communications Squadron		Little Rock AFB, Arkansas	1977–1991 Consolidated with 314th Commm Sq
2152d Communications Squadron	Naha AB, Okinawa	AFCS / AFCC, Inactive	
2152d Communications Squadron		Grand Forks AFB	1977–1991, consolidated with 319th Comm Sq
2153d Communications Squadron		Malmstrom AFB	1977–1991, consolidated with 341st Comm Sq
2155th Communications Squadron		McConnell AFB, Kansas	1977–1991, redesignated 384th Comm Sq
2156th Communications Squadron		Beale AFB, California	1 Jan 1981–1987
2157th Communications Squadron		Dobbins AFB, Georgia	1972–1988
2160th Communications Squadron		RAF Fairford, United Kingdom	1979–1990, Inactive
2161st Communications Squadron		RAF Greenham Common, United Kingdom	AFCS / AFCC, Inactive
2162d Communications Squadron	Ben Guerir AB, Morocco	Was 1262 AACS Sq, Inactive	
2162d Communications Squadron		Buckley ANGB, Colorado	1979–1992, Reactivated in 2010 as 802 Comm Sq
2163d Communications Squadron	RAF Wethersfield, United Kingdom	AFCC, AFCS / AFCC, Inactive	
2163d Communications Squadron		Peterson AFB, CO	1979–1987. Redesignated 2163d Communications Group.
2164th Communications Squadron		RAF Bentwaters, United Kingdom	Formerly 1264th AACS Sq, 1961–1991
2165th Communications Squadron	Taipei AS, Taiwan	was 1265th AACS Squadron 1961– ?, Inactive	
2165th Communications Squadron		Cape Cod AFS, MA	1975–1987
2166th Communications Squadron		RAF Alconbury, United Kingdom	Was 1266 AACS Sq, 1961–1991
2167th Communications Squadron	Kalkar AS, Germany	2005th Communications Wing, AFCC, AFCS / AFCC, Inactive	
2168th Communications Squadron		RAF Upper Heyford, United Kingdom	1966–1991, redesignated 620th Comm Sq
2172d Communications Squadron	Evreux-Fauville AB, France	AFCS / AFCC, Inactive	
2175th Communications Squadron	Donaldson AFB, South Carolina	AFCS / AFCC, Inactive	
2176th Communications Squadron	Prestwick Airport, United Kingdom	1961–1966 AFCS, Was 1276th AACS Sq Inactive	
2176th Communications Squadron		1982–1991 RAF Mildenhall, United Kingdom	AFCC, Consolidated with 513th Comm Sq
2177th Communications Squadron		Kincheloe AFB, Michigan	AFCS/AFCC, Inactive
2179th Communications Squadron	Patrick AFB, FL	1961–1974, 1986–1991. Formerly 1279th AACS Squadron. Consolidated with 45th Airways Detachment as 45th Communications Squadrons	
2180th Communications Squadron	High Wycombe AS, United Kingdom	AFCS / AFCC, Inactive	
2181st Communications Squadron		Monte Virgine, Italy	1976–1990
2184th Communications Squadron	(1987) (1990)	Hahn AB, West Germany	2005th Communications Wing, was 1284 AACS Sq, 1961–1991 Inactive
2186th Communications Squadron		Torrejon AB, Spain	1983–1991. Redesignated 401st Comm Sq.
2187th Communications Squadron	Aviano AB, Italy	AFCS / AFCC, Inactive	
2189th Communications Squadron	Camp Darby, Italy	1964–1970	
2189th Communications Squadron		Comiso AS, Italy	1982–1990. Redesignated 744th Comm Sq.
2191st Communications Squadron	Dow AFB, Maine	AFCS / AFCC, Inactive	
2192d Communications Squadron		Loring AFB, ME	1961–1991. Formerly 1292d AACS Squadron. Redesignated 42d Communications Squadron.
2194th Communications Squadron	Johnson Island, Pacific Ocean	AFCS / AFCC, Inactive	
2199th Communications Squadron	Brooks AFB, Texas	Nov 1986–1990	
3514th Communications Sq		Lowry AFB, Colorado	Formerly 1987th Commm Sq, 1991–1994
3480th Communications Squadron		Goodfellow AFB, Texas	Formerly 2081st Comm Sq. 1992 Redesignated 391st Comm Sq
3700th Communications Squadron		Lackland AFB, Texas	Was 1921st Communications Sq, Apr 1991 – Sep 1992, redesignated 394th Communications Sq
3750th Communications Squadron		Sheppard AFB, Texas	1992, Former;y 2054th Comm Sq, redesignated 396th Comm Sq
7274th Communications Squadron	RAF Chicksands, England	Was 2112th Communications Sq. Apr 1991 – August 1993. Redesignated 774th Communications Sq.	
7275th Communications Squadron	San Vito dei Normanni AS, Italy	Was 2113th Communications Sq. Apr 1991 – August 1993. Redesignated 775th Communications Sq.	
7276th Communications Squadron		Iraklion AB, Greece	Was 2115th Communications Sq. May 1991 – Apr 1994,
7625th Communications Squadron		United States Air Force Academy, Co	1 April 1991 – c. 16 Jan 1993. Was 1876th Communications Group; redesignated 54th Communications Squadron.

==== Communications Groups ====
Group	Emblem	Location	Note
1956th Communications Group		Camp Drake, Japan; Yokota AB, Japan	Organized as the 167th AACS Squadron, 1 June 1948; Redesignated 1956th AACS Squadron, 1 Oct 1948; Redesignated 1956th AACS Group, 18 Sep 1959; Redesignated 1956th Communications Group, 1 Jul 1961; Redesignated 1956th Information Systems Group, 1 Aug 1984; Redesignated 1956th Communications Group, 1 Nov 1986. Realigned under PACAF from AFCC in Oct 1990. Inactivated in April 1992 and replaced by the 374th Communications Squadron.
1961st Communications Group		Clark Field, Philippines	organized as the 141st Airways and Air Communications Service Squadron, 1 June 1948; Redesignated 1961st AACS Squadron, 1 Oct 1948; Redesignated 1961st AACS Group, 8 Oct 1959; Redesignated 1961st Communications Group; Redesignated 1961st Information Systems Group, 1 Aug 1984; Redesignated 1961st Communications Group, 1 Nov 1986. Realigned under PACAF from AFCC in Oct 1990. Inactivated in Sep 1991 due to the closure of Clark AB. Reactivated as 644th Combat Communications Squadron.

==== Airways and Air Communications Service squadrons ====
The first Airways and Air Communications Service (AACS) squadrons were formed on 1 June 1948, when the United States Air Force (USAF) discontinued the Army Air Forces Base Unit system while implementing the Wing Base reorganization (Hobson Plan). On 1 October 1948, active AACS squadrons were renumbered starting at 1900 when USAF required Major Command controlled units to have four digits contained within blocks of numbers allotted to the commands. AACS Squadrons active on 1 June 1961 were redesignated as communications squadrons. Those squadrons numbered in the 1200s were renumbered in the 2100s retaining the last two digits of their AACS number.

Squadron	Emblem	Location	Note
101st AACS Squadron	March AFB, CA	Jun–Oct 1948. Replaced 731st Air Force Base Unit. Redesignated 1907th AACS Squadron.	
102d AACS Squadron	McChord AFB, WA	Jun–Oct 1948. Replaced 732d Air Force Base Unit. Redesignated 1905th AACS Squadron.	
103d AACS Squadron	Wright-Patterson AFB, OH	Jun–Oct 1948. Replaced 733d Air Force Base Unit. Redesignated 1914th AACS Squadron.	
104th AACS Squadron	Olmsted AFB, PA	Jun–Oct 1948. Replaced 734th Air Force Base Unit. Redesignated 1912th AACS Squadron.	
105th AACS Squadron	Carswell AFB, TX	Jun–Oct 1948. Replaced 735th Air Force Base Unit. Redesignated 1921st AACS Squadron.	
106th AACS Squadron	Lowry AFB, CO	Jun–Oct 1948. Replaced 736th Air Force Base Unit. Redesignated 1910th AACS Squadron.	
108th AACS Squadron	Maxwell AFB, AL	Jun–Oct 1948. Replaced 738th Air Force Base Unit. Redesignated 1922d AACS Squadron.	
109th AACS Squadron	Fort Myer, VA	Jun–Oct 1948. Replaced 739th Air Force Base Unit. Redesignated 1908th AACS Squadron.	
116th AACS Squadron	Kaufbeuren Air Base, Germany	Jun–Oct 1948. Replaced 746th Air Force Base Unit. Redesignated 1944th AACS Squadron.	
120th AACS Squadron	Davis AFB, AK	Jun–Oct 1948. Replaced 750th Air Force Base Unit. Redesignated 1929th AACS Squadron.	
123d AACS Squadron	Biggs AFB, TX	Jun–Oct 1948. Replaced 723d Air Force Base Unit. Redesignated 1900th AACS Squadron.	
124th AACS Squadron	Fairfield-Suisun AFB, CA	Jun–Oct 1948. Replaced 724th Air Force Base Unit. Redesignated 1901st AACS Squadron.	
140th AACS Squadron	Lajes Air Base, Azores	Jun–Oct 1948. Replaced 770th Air Force Base Unit. Redesignated 1936th AACS Squadron.	
141st AACS Squadron	Clark AFB, Philippines	Jun–Oct 1948. Replaced 771st Air Force Base Unit. Redesignated 1961st AACS Squadron.	
145th AACS Squadron	Hickam AFB, HI	Jun–Oct 1948. Replaced 775th Air Force Base Unit. Redesignated 1957th AACS Squadron.	
164th AACS Squadron	Misawa AB, Japan	Jun–Oct 1948. Replaced 794th Air Force Base Unit.	
167th AACS Squadron	Tokyo, Japan	Jun–Oct 1948. Redesignated 1956th AACS Squadron.	
170th AACS Squadron	Yontan Airfield, Okinawa	Jun–Oct 1948. Redesignated 1962d AACS Squadron.	
187th AACS Squadron	Hill AFB, UT	Jun–Oct 1948. Replaced 757th Air Force Base Unit. Redesignated 1906th AACS Squadron.	
188th AACS Squadron	Andrews AFB, MD	Jun–Oct 1948. Replaced 758th Air Force Base Unit. Redesignated 1909th AACS Squadron.	
1230th AACS Squadron	RAF Croughton, United Kingdom	Jul 1955 – Jul 1961, redesignater 2130th Communications Sq	
1237th AACS Squadron	Spangdahlem Air Base, Germany	1954–1961. Redesignated 2137th Communications Squadron	
1276th AACS Squadron	Prestwick Airport, Scotland	1957–1961. Redesignated 2137th Communications Squadron	
1279th AACS Squadron	Patrick AFB, FL	1961. Redesignated 2179th Communications Squadron	
1292d AACS Squadron	Loring AFB, ME	1955–1961. Redesignated 2192d Communications Squadron	
1856th AACS Squadron	Andrews AFB, MD	AFCS, Activated: 20 Jan 1949 – Inactivated: on 23 Jul 1949	
1872d AACS Squadron	Andrews AFB, MD	AFCS, Activated: 1 Jul 1952 – Inactivated: on 18 Jul 1957	
1874th AACS Squadron	Andrews AFB, MD	Activated: 1 Mar 1954 – Inactivated: on 18 Jul 1957 AACS, Inactive	
1880th AACS Squadron	Andrews AFB, MD	Activated: 1 Nov 1954 – Inactivated: on 18 Jul 1957 AACS / AFCS, Inactive	
1900th AACS Squadron	Biggs AFB, TX	1948–1961. Formerly 123d AACS Sq. Redesignated 1900th Communications Squadron.	
1901st AACS Squadron	Travis AFB, CA	1948–1961. Formerly 124th AACS Sq. Redesignated 1901st Communications Squadron.	
1902d AACS Squadron	Hamilton AFB, CA	1954–1961. Redesignated 1902d Communications Squadron.	
1904th AACS Squadron	Malmstrom AFB, MT	1954–1961. Redesignated 1904th Communications Squadron.	
1905th AACS Squadron	McChord AFB, WA	1948–1961. Formerly 102d AACS Sq. Redesignated 1905th Communications Squadron.	
1906th AACS Squadron	Hill AFB, UT	1948–1961. Formerly 187th AACS Sq. Redesignated 1906th Communications Squadron.	
1907th AACS Squadron	March AFB, CA	1948–1961. Formerly 101st AACS Sq. Redesignated 1907th Communications Squadron.	
1908th AACS Squadron	Fort Myer, VA	1948–1954. Formerly 109th AACS Sq. Discontinued.	
1909th AACS Squadron	Andrews AFB, MD	1948–1952. Formerly 188th AACS Sq. Assets transferred to 2045th AACS Squadron.	
1909th AACS Squadron	Andrews AFB, MD	1954–1956. Base functions separated from 2045th AACS Squadron, returned. Discontinued.	
1909th AACS Squadron	Andrews AFB, MD	1958–1961. Base functions separated from 2045th AACS Squadron, returned. Discontinued.	
1910th AACS Squadron	Lowry AFB, CO	1948–1949. Formerly 106th AACS Sq. Discontinued.	
1912th AACS Squadron	Olmsted AFB, PA	1948–1954. Formerly 104th AACS Sq. Discontinued.	
1914th AACS Squadron	March AFB, CA	1948–1954. Formerly 103d AACS Sq. Discontinued. Assets transferred to 2046th AACS Squadron.	
1921st AACS Squadron	Carswell AFB, TX	October 1948 – November 1954. Formerly 105th AACS Squadron. Discontinued. Assets transferred to 2048th AACS Squadron.	
1921st AACS Squadron	Carswell AFB, TX	Oct 1955 – Jul 1956 Discontinued	
1922d AACS Squadron	Maxwell AFB, AL	1948–1954. Formerly 108th AACS Squadron. Discontinued. Assets transferred to 2047th AACS Squadron.	
1929th AACS Squadron	Davis AFB, AK	1948–1961. Formerly 120th AACS Squadron. Discontinued.	
1930th Airways & Air Communications Service Squadron, Detachment 1	Marks AFB, Alaska	AACS, Inactive	
1936th AACS Squadron	Lajes Air Base, Azores	1948–1961. Formerly 140th AACS Squadron. Redesignated 1936th Communications Squadron.	
1941st AACS Squadron	Waller AFB, Trinidad	AACS, Inactive	
1942d AACS Squadron	Homestead AFB, FL	1957–1961 Redesignated 1942d Communications Squadron.	
1944th AACS Squadron	Kaufbeuren Air Base Fürstenfeldbruck AB Bitburg AB, Germany	1948–1959. Formerly 116th AACS Squadron. Discontinued.	
1954th AACS Squadron	Johnson AB, Japan	1959–1961. Inactivated and assets absorbed by 1956th Communications Group.	
1955th AACS Squadron	Itazuke AB, Japan	1959–1961. Redesignated 1955th Communications Squadron.	
1956th AACS Squadron	Tokyo, Japan; Fuchu AS, Japan	1948–1959. Formerly 167th AACS Squadron. Location: Central Tokyo, 1 Oct 1948; Fuchu AS (Tokyo), 20 Aug 1953; Yokota AB (Tokyo), 30 Sep 1974. Redesignated: 1956th AACS Group, 18 Sep 1959; 1956th Communications Group, 1 Jul 1961; 1956th Information Systems Group, 1 Aug 1984; 1956th Communications Group, 1 Nov 1986. Inactivated and replaced by the 374th Communications Squadron on 1 Apr 1992.	
1957th AACS Squadron	Hickam AFB, HI	1948–1959. Formerly 145th AACS Squadron. Redesignated: HQ 1957th AACS Group, 18 Sep 1959; 1957th Communications Group, 1 Jul 1961; 1957th Information Systems Group, 1 Aug 1984; 1957th Communications Group, 1 Nov 1986.	
1959th AFCS Squadron	Air Force Academy, CO	AFCS 1967–1968.	
1961st AACS Squadron	Clark AB, Philippines	1948–1959. Formerly 141st AACS Squadron. Redesignated: 1961st AACS Group, 18 Sep 1959; 1961st Communications Group, 1 Jul 1961; 1961st Information Systems Group, 1 Aug 1984; 1961st Communications Group, 1 Nov 1986.	
1962d AACS Squadron	Yontan Airfield, Kadena AB, Okinawa	1948–1959. Formerly 170th AACS Squadron. Redesignated: 1962d AACS Group, 18 Sep 1959; HQ 1962d AACS Group, 8 Jan 1960; 1962d Communications Group, 1 Jul 1961; 1962d Communications Squadron, 15 Jan 1975; 1962d Communications Group, 28 Feb 1977; 1962d Information Systems Group, 1 Aug 1984; 1962d Communications Group; 1 Nov 1986.	
2038th AACS Squadron		Larson AFB, Washington	AFCS / AFCC, Inactive
2040th AACS Squadron	Cannon AFB, NM	1956–1961 Redesignated 2040th Communications Squadron.	
2045th AACS Squadron	Andrews AFB, Maryland	1952–1955 Redesignated 2045th AACS Group Inactive	
8544th AACS Squadron	Barksdale AFB, LA	AF Reserves, Activated: 27 Jun 1949 – Inactivated: on 23 Jul 1951	
8545th AACS Squadron	Carswell AFB, TX	AF Reserves, Activated: 27 Jun 1949 – Inactivated: on 15 Jul 1951	
8551st AACS Squadron	Andrews AFB, MD	AF Reserves, Activated: 1 Sep 1949 – Inactivated: on 3 Jul 1951	

==== USAF Communications Squadrons ====
Squadron	Emblem	Location	Note
1061st USAF Communications Squadron		Washington, DC	1951–1953. – Redesignated 2044th AACS Squadron. Currently 844th Communications Group.
1062d USAF Communications Squadron		Wright-Patterson AFB, OH	1951–1953. Redesignated 2046th AACS Squadron. Currently 83d Communications Group.
1063d USAF Communications Squadron		Maxwell AFB, AL	1951–1953. Redesignated 2047th AACS Squadron.
1064th USAF Communications Squadron		Carswell AFB, TX	1941–1953. Redesignated 2048th AACS Squadron.
1065th USAF Communications Squadron		McClellan AFB, CA	1951–1953. Redesignated 2046th AACS Squadron. Most recently 77th Communications Squadron, inactivated 2002.

emblems

== Communications Support Squadrons (CSPTS or JCSS) ==
- Air Combat Command Communications Support Squadron
- 224th Joint Communications Support Squadron, formerly 224th Combat Communications Squadron (Contingency), Brunswick, Georgia, Georgia Air National Guard
- 290th Joint Communications Support Squadron, MacDill AFB, Florida Air National Guard
- 375th Communications Support Squadron, 375th Communications Group, 375th Air Mobility Wing

== Expeditionary Communications Squadrons (ECS) ==
Squadron	Emblem	Location	Note
75th Expeditionary Communications Squadron		Cairo West Air Base	Inactive, see Operation Bright Star, 75th Air Expeditionary Group
320th Expeditionary Communications Squadron		Inactive, see 320th Air Expeditionary Wing	
321st Expeditionary Communications Squadron		Iraq	See 321st Air Expeditionary Wing
332d Expeditionary Communications Squadron		Joint Base Balad, Iraq	Inactive, see 332d Air Expeditionary Wing
363d Expeditionary Communications Squadron		Prince Sultan AB	Inactive; See 363d Air Expeditionary Wing
376th Expeditionary Communications Squadron		Transit Center at Manas	Inactive since 2014; See 376th Air Expeditionary Wing
379th Expeditionary Communications Squadron		See 379th Air Expeditionary Wing	
380th Expeditionary Communications Squadron		Al Dhafra Air Base	Was 380th Comm Sq, 2002– See 380th Air Expeditionary Wing
386th Expeditionary Communications Squadron		Ali Al Salem AB, Kuwait	see 386th Air Expeditionary Wing
407th Expeditionary Communications Squadron		Ali AB, Iraq	Inactive, see 407th Air Expeditionary Group
444th Expeditionary Communications Squadron		Shindand AB	Inactivated or redesignated 444th Combat Communications Squadron before Nov. 2011
445th Communications Squadron		Niagara Falls IAP, NY; Norton AFB, CA; Wright-Patterson AFB, OH	1952–1958, 1987–1992, 1994–2012
447th Expeditionary Communications Squadron		Sather AB, Iraq	Inactive, see 447th Air Expeditionary Group
451st Expeditionary Communications Squadron		Kandahar International Airport	See 451st Air Expeditionary Wing
455th Expeditionary Communications Squadron		Bagram Airfield, Afghanistan	See 455th Air Expeditionary Wing
506th Expeditionary Communications Squadron		Kirkuk Regional Air Base, Iraq	Inactive, see 506th Air Expeditionary Group
735th Expeditionary Communications Squadron		Ramstein AB, Germany	Inactive, supported Combined Endeavor

== Combat Communications Squadrons (CBCS) ==
Squadron	Emblem	Location	Note
1st Combat Communications Squadron		Ramstein AB, Germany	See: 435th Air Ground Operations Wing
4th Combat Communications Squadron		Altus AFB, Oklahoma	
21st Combat Communications Squadron		Patrick AFB, FL	1998-1993
22d Combat Communications Squadron		Patrick AFB, FL	1998-1993
23d Combat Communications Squadron		Patrick AFB, FL Travis AFB, CA	1998-1993, 2009–present
28th Combat Communications Squadron		Travis AFB, CA	US Air Force Reserve
31st Combat Communications Squadron		Tinker AFB, Oklahoma	3 CCG
32d Combat Communications Squadron		Tinker AFB, Oklahoma	3 CCG
33d Combat Communications Squadron		Tinker AFB, Oklahoma	3 CCG
34th Combat Communications Squadron		Tinker AFB, Oklahoma	3 CCG
35th Combat Communications Squadron		Tinker AFB, Oklahoma	
41st Combat Communications Squadron |			
42d Combat Communications Squadron		McGuire AFB, New Jersey	Reactivated in 2016 as 42nd Cyberspace Operations Squadron at Scott AFB
51st Combat Communications Squadron		Robins AFB, Georgia	5 CCG
52d Combat Communications Squadron		Robins AFB, Georgia	5 CCG
53d Combat Communications Squadron		Robins AFB, Georgia	5 CCG
54th Combat Communications Squadron		Robins AFB, Georgia	5 CCG
55th Combat Communications Squadron		Robins AFB, Georgia	5 CCG
114th Combat Communications Squadron		Patrick Space Force Base, FL	
118th Combat Communications Squadron		Badin ANGB	formerly 118th Comm Sq Jan 1993 – Oct 1999 redesignated 118th Air Support Ops Sq
143d Combat Communications Squadron		Seattle ANGB, Washington	
147th Combat Communications Squadron		San Diego, California	162 CCG
148th Combat Communications Squadron		Ontario ANGS, California	Redesignated 162 CCG; 148th Space Operations Squadron
149th Combat Communications Squadron		North Highlands ANGS, California	162 CCG
206th Combat Communications Squadron		Elmendorf AFB, Alaska	201 CCG; Inactivated in 2008
221st Combat Communications Squadron		Hensley Field AGS, Texas	254 CCG
222d Combat Communications Squadron		Costa Mesa ANGS, California	162 CCG; Redesignated 222d Intelligence Support Squadron
223d Combat Communications Squadron		Hot Springs ANGS, Arkansas	
224th Joint Communications Support Squadron		Brunswick ANGB, Georgia	224 JCSS (Supports the Joint Communications Support Element, MacDill AFB, FL)
225th Combat Communications Squadron		Martin ANGS, Alabama	226 CCG
228th Combat Communications Squadron		McGhee-Tyson ANGB, Tennessee	226 CCG
231st Combat Communications Squadron		Andrews AFB, Maryland	253 CCG
232d Combat Communications Squadron		Montgomery, Alabama	226 CCG
234th Combat Communications Squadron		Hayward ANGS, California	162 CCG; Redesignated 234th Intelligence Squadron
238th Combat Communications Squadron		Key Field, Mississippi	251 CCG Redesignated 238th Air Support Operations Squadron in 2009
239th Combat Communications Squadron		St Louis, Missouri	251 CCG
240th Combat Communications Squadron		Columbia, South Carolina	disbanded 2007
242d Combat Communications Squadron		Spokane International Airport, Washington	252d CCG
244th Combat Communications Squadron		Salem, Oregon	
255th Combat Communications Squadron			
261st Combat Communications Squadron		Sepulveda ANGS, California	162 CCG
262d Combat Communications Squadron		Bellingham, Washington	252 CCG; Redesignated 262d Information Warfare Aggressor Squadron
263d Combat Communications Squadron		Charlotte, North Carolina	281 CCG
264th Combat Communications Squadron		Peoria, Illinois	251 CCG
265th Combat Communications Squadron		South Portland, Maine	253 CCG
267th Combat Communications Squadron		Falmouth, Massachusetts	253 CCG
269th Combat Communications Squadron		Springfield ANGB, Ohio	251 CCG
271st Combat Communications Squadron		Annville, Pennsylvania	
272d Combat Communications Squadron		Portland, Oregon	
280th Special Operations Communications Squadron			
282d Combat Communications Squadron		North Smithfield, Rhode Island	281 CCG
283d Combat Communications Squadron		Dobbins ARB, Georgia	281 CCG
285th Combat Communications Squadron		Dobbins ARB, Georgia	redesignated 285th Civil Engineering Squadron
290th Joint Communications Support Squadron		MacDill AFB, Florida	290 JCSS (Supports the Joint Communications Support Element, MacDill AFB, FL)
291st Combat Communications Squadron		Hilo, Hawaii	201 CCG
292d Combat Communications Squadron		Kahului, Hawaii	201 CCG
293rd Combat Communications Squadron		Hickam AFB, Hawaii	201 CCG
607th Combat Communications Squadron		Camp Humphreys, Republic of South Korea	
644th Combat Communications Squadron		Andersen AFB, Guam	

== Space Communications Squadrons (SCS) ==
A Space Communications Squadron was a Communications Squadron supporting Air Force Space Command, and later the United States Space Force to which all active SCS transferred in 2020-2021.

Squadron	Emblem	Location	Note
3d Space Communications Squadron		Kapaun AS, Germany	Inactivated 2002. Redesignated 3rd Satellite Communications Squadron in 2022.
21st Space Communications Squadron		Peterson Space Force Base	Redesignated 21st Communications Squadron, 15 May 2008. Transferred to United States Space Force, 15 Jul 2021. See Space Base Delta 1.
30th Space Communications Squadron		Vandenberg Space Force Base	Inactivated 2024. Duties assumed by 30th Base Communications Directorate. See Space Launch Delta 30.
45th Space Communications Squadron		Patrick Space Force Base	Inactive. Duties assumed by 45th Base Communications Directorate. See Space Launch Delta 45.
50th Space Communications Squadron		Schriever Space Force Base	Redesignated 50th Communications Squadron in 2020. Transferred to USSF in 2021. Redesignated 69th Cyberspace Squadron in 2022.
460th Space Communications Squadron		Buckley Space Force Base	See 460th Space Wing. Redesignated 460th Cyberspace Squadron in 2018, currently 64th Cyberspace Squadron.
614th Space Communications Squadron		Vandenberg SFB	Active since 23 Jan 2004. Redesignated as 614 Air and Space Communications Squadron in 2011, and 65th Cyberspace Squadron in 2021. See Space Delta 5
850th Space Communications Squadron		Schriever AFB	Inactivated 2006, functions absorbed by 50 SCS.

== Engineering Installation Squadrons ==
Squadron	Emblem	Location	Note
1827th Electronics Installation Squadron		Kelly AFB, TX	Inactive, Briefly changed to the 838th EIS and closed with the BRAC closure of Kelly AFB
1828th Electronics Installation Squadron		Wright Patterson AFB, OH	Inactive
1830th Electronics Installation Squadron		Cape Canaveral AFS, FL	Inactive, Absorbed by 2179 Communications Group, Patrick AFB, FL
1831st Electronics Installation Squadron		Robins AFB, GA	Inactive
1835th Engineering Installation Squadron		Norton AFB, CA	
1836th Engineering Installation Squadron		Lindsey AS, West Germany	1892 Airways and Air Communications Service Engineering and Installations Squadron designated and organized, 18 Jan 1957. Redesignated 1892 AACS Installations Squadron, 18 Jan 1958. Redesignated 2874 GEEIA Squadron, 1 Jan 1959. Redesignated 1836 Electronics Installation Squadron, 1 May 1970. Redesignated HQ 1836 Engineering Installation Group, 1 Jul 1980
−1838th Electronics Installation Squadron		Clark AB Philippines	Inactivated, 15 Jan 1974
1837th Electronics Installation Squadron		Yokota AB, Japan	Formerly 2875th GEEIA Squadron (Pacific GEEIA Region), stationed at Tachikawa AB, Japan. Redesignated to 1837th EIS in 1970, and moved to Yokota AB in 1971.
−1838th Electronics Installation Squadron		Clark AB, Philippines	
−1839th Electronics Installation Group		Keesler AFB, Mississippi	
1849th Electronics Installation Squadron		McClellan AFB, CA	Redesignated 938th Engineering Installation Squadron 1994-2000. Inactivated
205th Engineering Installation Squadron		OK ANG, Oklahoma	
220th Engineering Installation Squadron		OH ANG, Zanesville Ohio	Active, Assigned to 251st Cyberspace Engineering Installation Group.

|−270th Electronics Installation Group || || PAANG Willow Grove PA ||

== Specialized Communications Squadrons ==
Squadron	Emblem	Location	Note
1st Communications Maintenance Squadron		Kapaun AS, Germany	USAFE Special Maintenance Team (SMT). Formerly known as Detachment 1, USAFE Computer Systems Squadron (CSS). Re-designated as a squadron in July 2004. See: 435th Air Ground Operations Wing
55th Strategic Communications Squadron		Offutt AFB, Nebraska	See 55th Wing
595th Strategic Communications Squadron		Offutt AFB, Nebraska	Since 28 February 2025. See 95th Wing
1850th Airborne Communications Squadron		Offutt AFB, Nebraska	was 1850th Airborne Information Systems Maintenance Sq Nov 1986 – July 1992
1853d Communications Maintenance Squadron		Offutt AFB, Nebraska	was 1853d Information Systems Maintenance Sq Nov 1986–1993
1025th Satellite Communications Squadron, Mobile		Holloman AFB, NM	1983–1986
Cyberspace Capabilities Squadron		Patrick Space Force Base, Florida	Activated 1 October 2015, inactivated 2018. See Air Force Technical Applications Center
