= 239th Combat Communications Squadron =

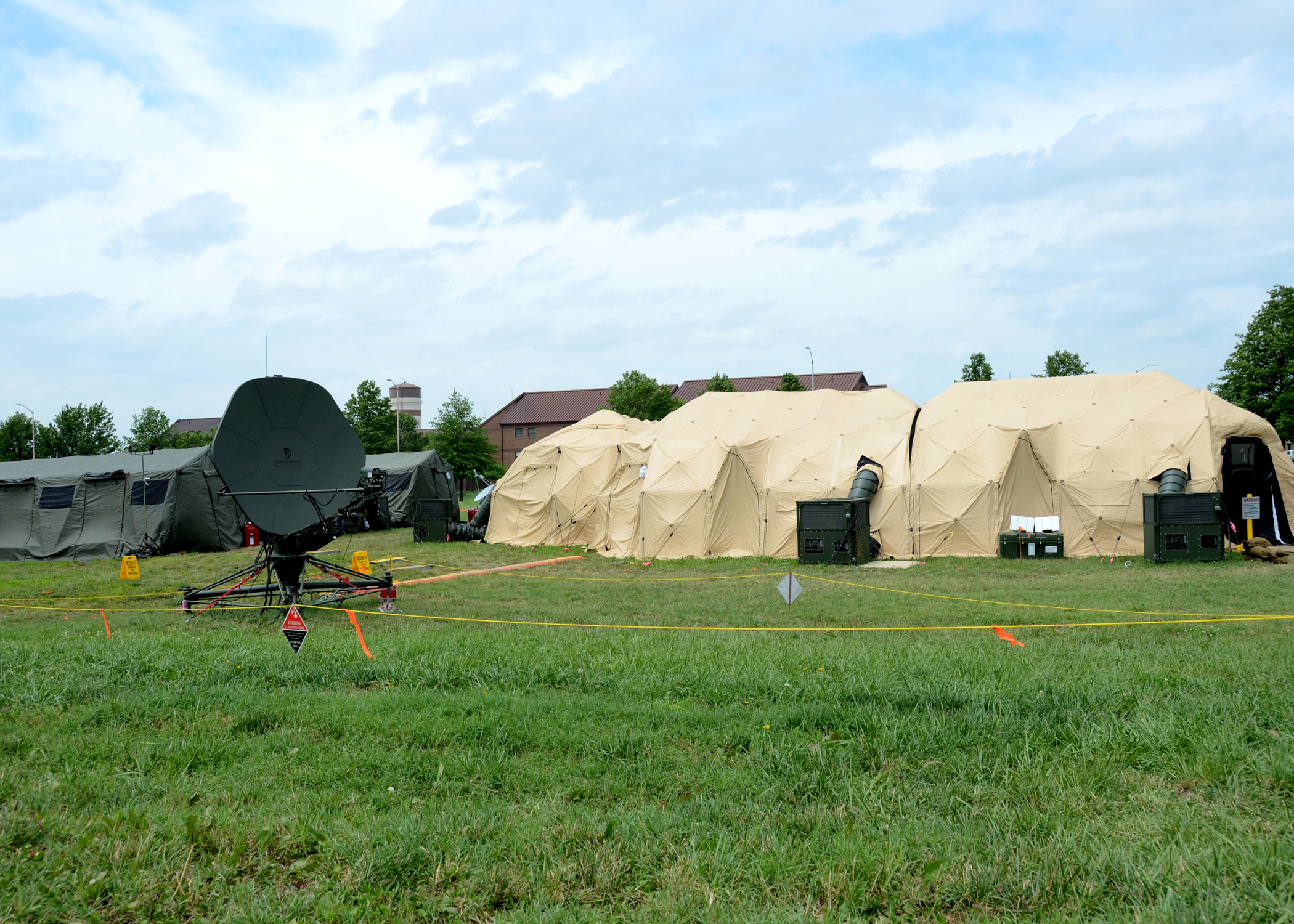
- 239th Combat Communications Squadron deployed for an exercise
- Active: c. 1954-present
- Country: United States
- Branch: Air National Guard
- Role: Deployable Communications Support
- Part of: Missouri Air National Guard
- Garrison/HQ: Jefferson Barracks, MO
- Motto: Defero Nam Libertas
- Mascot: Brown Recluse

Commanders
- Current commander: Maj David L. Hood

Insignia
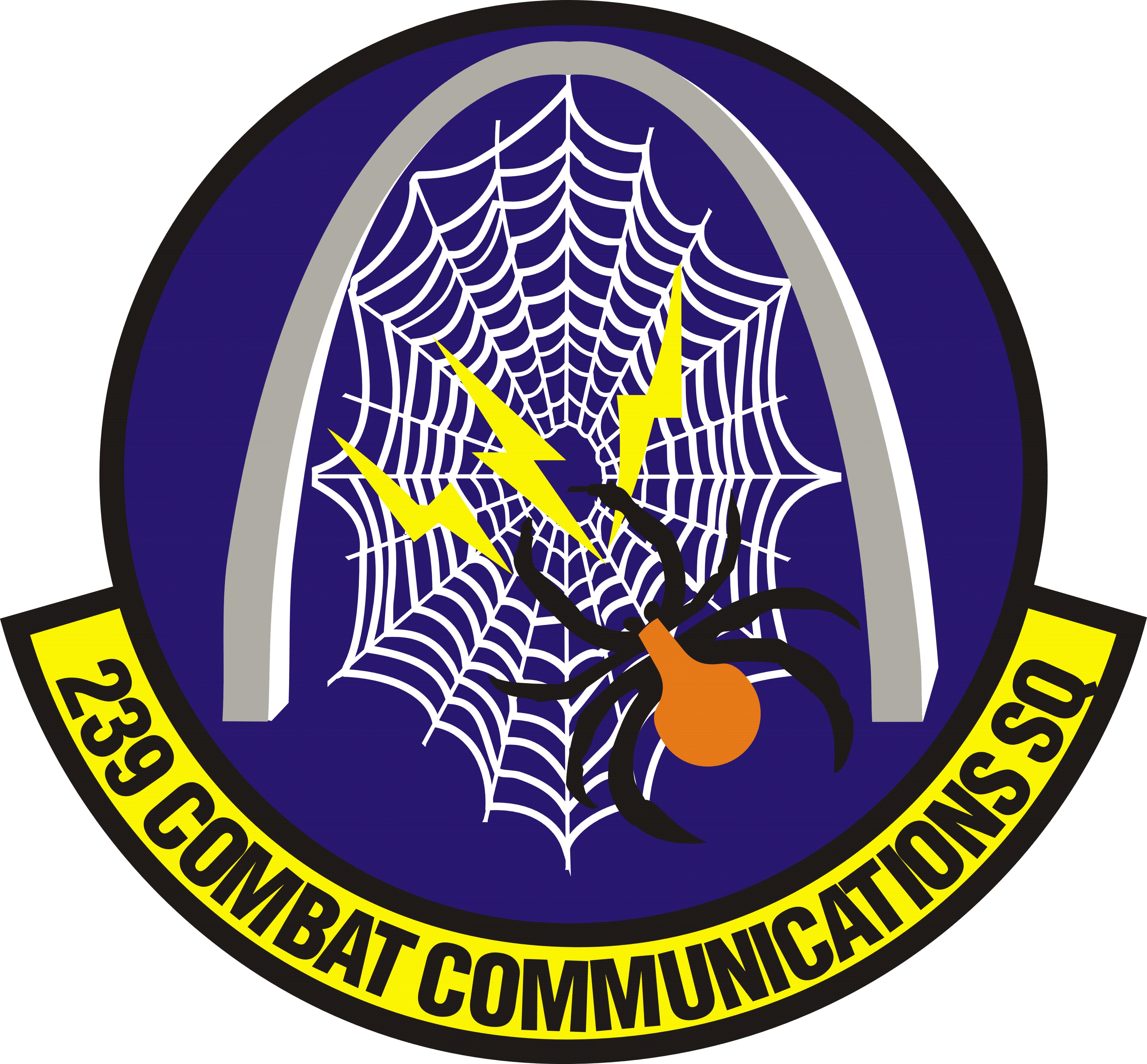
- 239th Combat Communications Squadron emblem

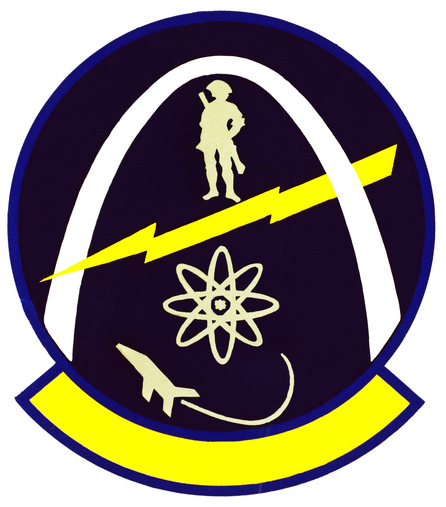
- Older 239th Combat Communications Squadron emblem

The United States Air Force's 239th Combat Communications Squadron is an Air National Guard combat communications unit located at Jefferson Barracks, Missouri. The unit has approximately 120 personnel.

== Lineage ==
- Constituted as the 239th Airways and Air Communications Service Flight

Activated by February 1954
Redesignated 239th Mobile Communications Flight (Light) on 1 June 1961
Redesignated 239th Mobile Communications Flight
Redesignated 239th Combat Communications Flight on 1 April 1976
Redesignated 239th Combat Communications Squadron on 8 October 1982
Redesignated 239th Combat Information Systems Squadron on 1 July 1985
Redesignated 239th Combat Communications Squadron on 1 November 1986

=== Assignments ===
- 242d Airways and Air Communications Service Squadron by February 1954
- 254th Combat Communications Group251st Communications Group (later 251st Mobile Communications Group, 251st Combat Communications Group, 251st Combat Information Systems Group, 251st Combat Communications Group
- 131st Bomb Wing

=== Stations ===
- Lambert Field (later Robertson Air National Guard Base), Missouri, by February 1954
- Jefferson Barracks, Missouri

=== Major Command/Gaining Command ===
- Airways and Air Communications Service (later Air Force Communications Service, Air Force Communications Command), by February 1954
- Air Combat Command, June 1992
- Air Force Space Command (???-2017)
- Air National Guard/Air Combat Command (2018 – present)

== See also ==
- List of United States Air Force communications squadrons
