= 281st Combat Communications Group =

U.S. Air Force unit

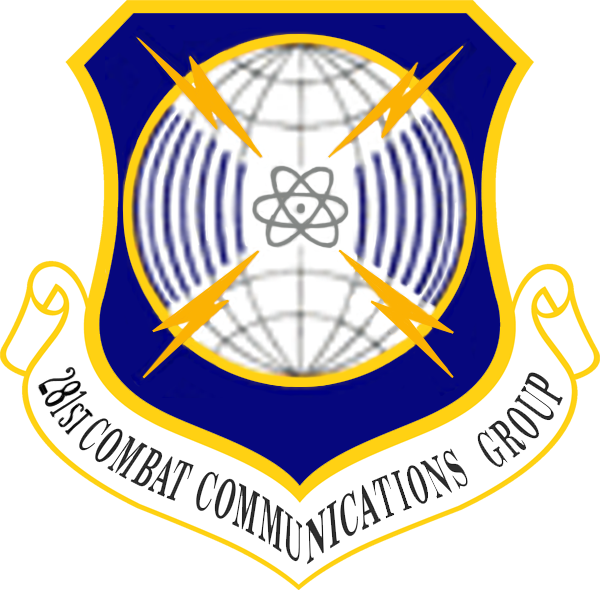
- 281st Combat Communications Group emblem
- Active: 1976–2013
- Country: United States
- Branch: United States Air Force
- Garrison/HQ: Smithfield, Rhode Island, USA

Commanders
- Notable commanders: Colonel Mark McGrath (final commander)

The United States Air Force's 281st Combat Communications Group was a Rhode Island Air National Guard combat communications unit located in North Smithfield, Rhode Island, United States.

== Mission ==
Federal: To install, operate, and maintain combat-ready equipment and personnel packages, to provide deployable communications and information (C&I) capability in support of the United States Air Force Joint Forces Air Component Commander (JFACC) and the Air Force Forces (AFFOR) Commander.

State: To be organized, equipped, and trained to function effectively in the protection of life, property and the preservation of peace, order, and public safety under competent orders of Rhode Island state authorities.

== History ==
The 281st Combat Communications Group (281 CCG) was established as the 281st Tactical Air Control Group on 1 April 1976. The Group Headquarters, the 282 Combat Communications Squadron (CBCS), and the 283 CBCS were formerly Tactical Air Control units. The 263 CBCS was assigned to the Group in 1988. In 1993, the 118 CBCS was assigned to the Group Hqs. The 118th was a NATO Air Base Support (NABS) organization and recently converted to an Initial Beddown mission in NATO. Prior to the new Tactical Contingency Communications Equipment – Central Area (TCCE-CA) mission, the 282CBCS and 283 CBCS provided the entire USAF inventory of MRC-113 wideband radios and TSC-38B high frequency radios. The MRC-113 was the largest and had the longest range and channel capacity of any USAF Tactical Wideband radio system. The TSC-38B provided secure record traffic and a telephone switch in addition to its HF radio capabilities. The 263 CBCS was part of the 251CCG from Springfield, Ohio and had the contingency squadron mission. They possessed a variety of analog communications equipment, including high frequency and line-of-sight radios, technical control, record communications center, tactical switchboards, and a Digital Subscriber Terminal. In 1985, the 281 CCG was selected as the USAF Component of the Tactical Contingency Communications Equipment – Central Area (TCCE-CA) in support of the United States Central Command (USCENTCOM).

== Assignments ==
=== Major Command/Gaining Command ===
- Air National Guard/Air Force Space Command (2008 – 30 Sep 2013)
- Air National Guard/Air Combat Command (1 June 1992 – 2008)
- Air National Guard/Tactical Air Command (1976 – 1 June 1992)

== Previous designations ==
- 281st Combat Communications Group (???–30 Sep 2013)

== Squadrons previously assigned ==
- 202nd Engineering and Installation Squadron
- 213th Engineering and Installation Squadron
- 231st Combat Communications Squadron, DCANG, Andrews AFB, Maryland
- 263d Combat Communications Squadron—New London, North Carolina
- 265th Combat Communications Squadron—South Portland, Maine
- 267th Combat Communications Squadron—Otis ANGB, Massachusetts
- 269th Combat Communications Squadron—Springfield, Ohio
- 271st Combat Communications Squadron—Annville, Pennsylvania
- 282d Combat Communications Squadron—North Smithfield, Rhode Island
- 283d Combat Communications Squadron—Marietta, Georgia

== Bases stationed ==
- Coventry, Rhode Island (2006?–30 Sep 2013)
- North Smithfield, Rhode Island (1976–2013)
