= 253rd Cyberspace Engineering Installation Group =

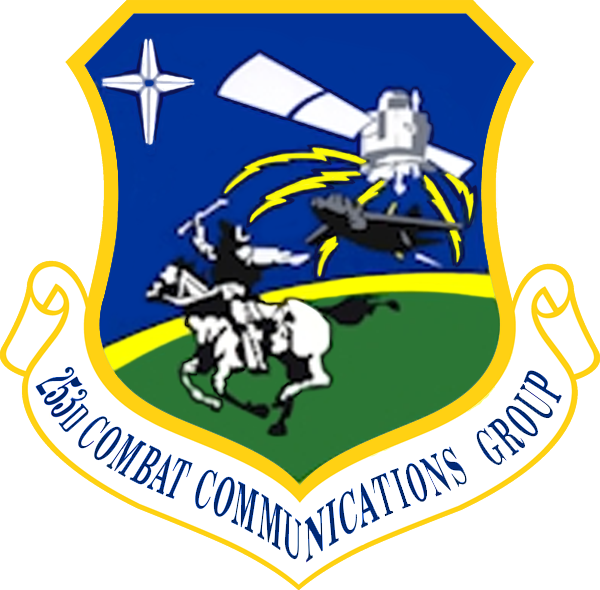
- 253rd Cyberspace Engineering Installation Group logo
- Active: 19xx–present
- Country: United States
- Branch: United States Air Force
- Garrison/HQ: Otis Air National Guard Base, Massachusetts, USA
- Engagements: Operation Desert Shield; Operation Desert Storm; Operation Enduring Freedom; Operation Iraqi Freedom

The 253rd Cyberspace Engineering Installation Group (253 CEIG) is located at Otis Air National Guard Base, Massachusetts, USA.

== Mission ==
The primary mission of the 253rd Cyberspace Engineering Installation Group is to train, advise, and direct combat-ready units. A secondary mission is to provide a ready militia to protect life and property and provide peacekeeping services in the U.S. if called upon.

The group is available to deploy anywhere in the world on short notice and provide communications, engineering and installation services in support of the Air Force. Upon mobilization, Air Force Space Command would assume operational command of the 253 CEIG.

At the state level, the group provides forces to the Commonwealth of Massachusetts for use during local or statewide disasters.

== History ==
The 253rd Cyberspace Engineering Installation Group relocated from Wellesley, MA to Otis in 1996 due to mission and equipment changes.

=== Post Cold War ===
Desert Shield/Storm began on 7 August 1991 after the invasion of Kuwait. Within ten days the 253rd Combat Communications Group units were involved in deploying equipment to support the Air Force and coalition forces in the Gulf. Volunteers from the 267CBCS, solicited by the 253rd Combat Communications Group Readiness Center, joined other Group members to deploy and support Desert Shield.

=== Global War on Terror ===
In 2001, the 267 CBCS, collocated with the 253rd Combat Communications Group, facilitated the first use of the Theater Deployable Communications Equipment during Operation Enduring Freedom. More than 20 personnel mobilized for the mission from September 2001 to July 2003. They augmented the Headquarters Air Combat Command staff in filling requirements for the U.S. Air Force/ANG.

== Previous designations ==
- 253rd Combat Communications Group

== Bases stationed ==
- Otis ANGB, Massachusetts (1996–present)
- Wellesley, Massachusetts (1960–1996)

== Equipment operated ==
- Theater Deployable Communications Equipment suite
