= 269th Combat Communications Squadron =

269th Combat Communications Squadron

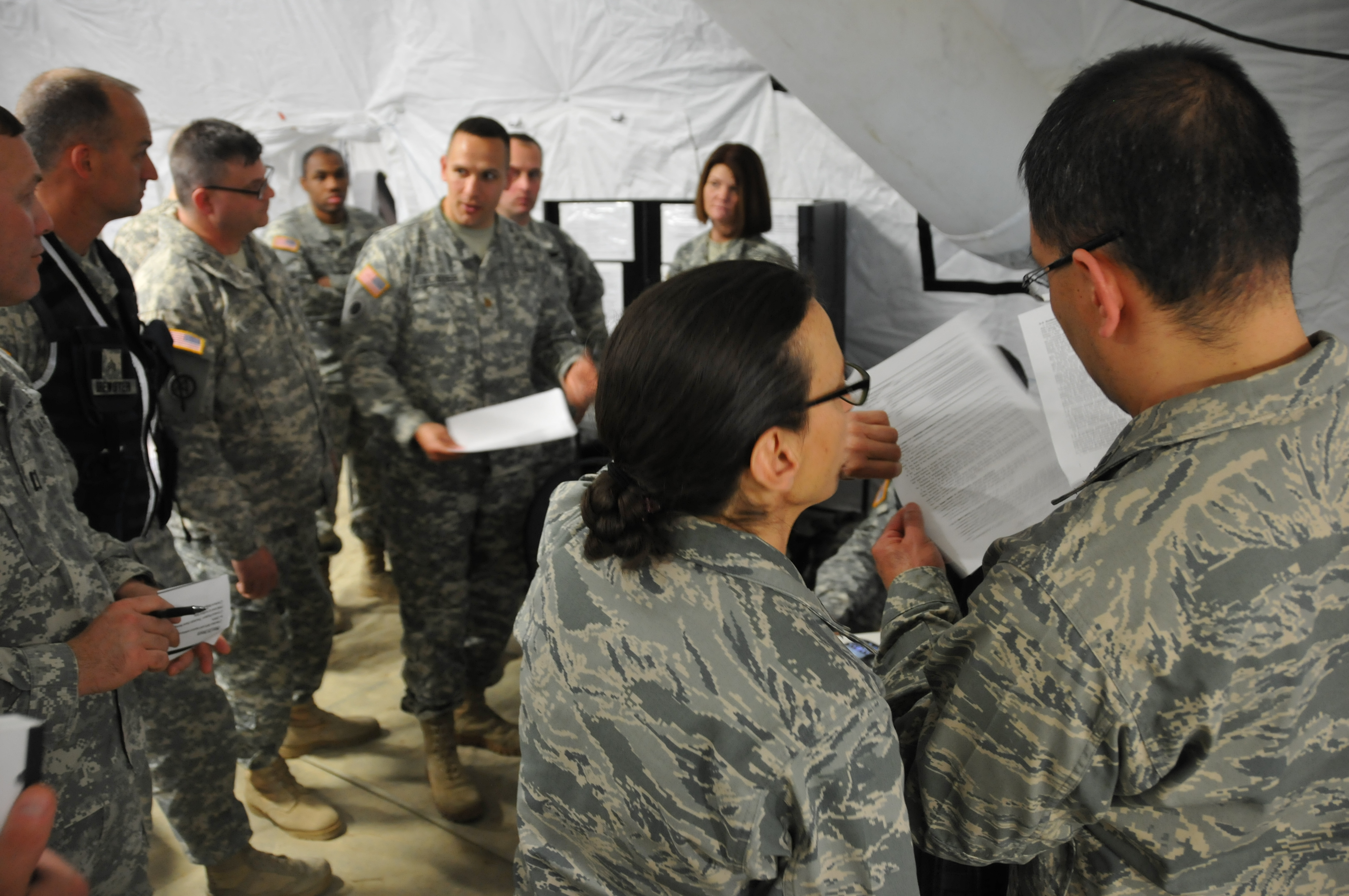
- Squadron members participate in a Homeland Emergency Response Force exercise
- Active: 1942–1945; 1947–present
- Country: United States
- Branch: Air National Guard
- Role: Combat communications
- Size: 105 personnel
- Part of: Ohio Air National Guard
- Garrison/HQ: Springfield Air National Guard Base, Ohio
- Mottos: First Then, First Now
- Engagements: Operation Noble Eagle
- Decorations: Air Force Outstanding Unit Award

Commanders
- Current commander: Lt Col Brian S. Marshall
- Ceremonial chief: CMSgt Jon King

Insignia
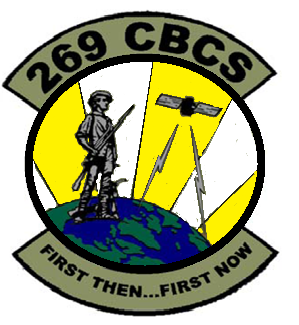
- 269th Combat Communications Squadron emblem

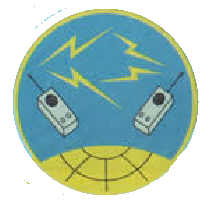
- 269th Mobile Communications Squadron emblem

The United States Air Force's 269th Combat Communications Squadron is an Ohio Air National Guard combat communications unit located at Springfield Air National Guard Base, Ohio. It is described as the oldest combat communications squadron in the Air Force, tracing its origins to the 77th Signal Platoon (Aviation), formed in March 1942, three months after the United States entered World War II.

During World War II, the unit served in England, Northern Ireland, Belgium, and across the Western Front, supporting the VIII Air Force Composite Command, the 1st Bombardment Division, and the VIII Fighter Command. After inactivation in December 1945, it was reconstituted as part of the Ohio National Guard and federally recognized in January 1948 at Springfield, Ohio.

The squadron's dual mission is to rapidly deploy an integrated force capable of establishing Command and Control (C2), communications, and Information Operations (IO) capabilities in support of military operations and federal and state agencies during homeland emergencies. The unit has received the Air Force Outstanding Unit Award on multiple occasions and has supported operations including Operation Noble Eagle.

== Mission ==
The dual mission of the 269th Combat Communications Squadron is to rapidly deploy an integrated force capable of establishing initial and build-up Command and Control (C2); Communications; and Information Operations (IO) capabilities to support the war fighter during times of war and Federal/State agencies during Homeland Emergencies.

== History ==
=== USAAC/WWII ===
The 269th Combat Communications Squadron is the oldest combat communications squadron in the Air Force and was formed three months after the attack on Pearl Harbor and the subsequent United States entry into World War II. It became the 77th Signal Platoon (Aviation), an Army communications element at Davis Monthan Field, Tucson, Arizona, with a complement of one person, a Private Bunn, who later became First Sergeant. The unit had an authorized strength of approximately two hundred personnel with all the tools and equipment essential to provide communications for a typical fighter or bomber unit headquarters and its detachments. The company trained at three stateside bases, Gowen Field, Idaho; Wendover Field, Utah; and Rapid City Army Air Base, South Dakota, before transferring to England in June 1943. They were renamed the 1077th Signal Company, Service Group and were assigned to Camp Cheddington, England. The 8th Air Force Composite Command was the first of a series of fighter and bomber units served by the company in England and Northern Ireland. Moving to Belgium with 1st Bombardment Division and the VIII AF Fighter Command in February 1945, the company was based at Charleroi, Belgium. From there they dispatched personnel to install and operate beacons and communications systems across the expanding front in France, Belgium, Luxembourg, the Netherlands, and Germany. They moved forward with the fliers and even participated in an infantry attack at Frislar.

=== Post-WWII ===
Returning to England in May 1945, the organization was assigned as a demobilization unit (a unit tasked with processing the discharge and return of military personnel to civilian life) until its own inactivation on 4 December 1945. The 1077th was reconstituted as the 605th Signal Light Construction Company of the Ohio National Guard on 24 May 1946. However, sufficient people to achieve federal recognition were not assembled at its new home at the state Armory on East Mulberry Street in Springfield until 29 January 1948. Three officers and fifteen men were assigned to the new company. The mission and name changed, concurrent with the construction of a new facility at Springfield Municipal Airport. The buildings were located across the road from the bustling airport on land which became the home of a much larger unit, the 178th Fighter Group. The 605th was renamed the 269th Communications Squadron Operations, effective 1 July 1952. In October 1952, it was assigned to the newly formed 251st Communications Group.

== Lineage ==
- Constituted as the 77th Signal Platoon (Air Base) on 24 February 1942

Activated c. March 1942
Redesignated 77th Signal Company, Service Group in July 1942
Redesignated 1077th Signal Company, Service Gp, c. June 1943
Inactivated on 4 December 1945

- Allotted to the National Guard on 24 May 1946 and redesignated 105 Signal Light Construction Company

Redesignation revoked and renumbered 605th Signal Light Construction Company

- Activated on 2 December 1947

Federally recognized on 29 January 48
Redesignated 269th Communications Squadron, Operations on 1 July 1952
Redesignated 269th Communications Squadron, Relay Center on 29 August 1961
Redesignated 269th Communications Squadron, Radio Relay in 1965
Redesignated 269th Communications Squadron, Relay Center in 1967
Redesignated 269th Mobile Communications Squadron (AFCCP) on 16 March 1968
Reesignated 269th Mobile Communications Squadron (AFCH)
Redesignated 269th Combat Communications Flight (AFCH) on 1 April 1976
Redesignated 269th Combat Communications Squadron on 1 March 1982
Redesignated 269th Combat Information Systems Squadron on 1 July 1984
Redesignated 269th Combat Communications Squadron on 1 October 1986

=== Assignments ===
- Unknown Air Base Group (later Service Group c. March 1942
- VIII Air Force Composite Command c. 1943
- 1st Bombardment Division
- VIII Fighter Command, to 4 December 1945
- 55th Fighter Wing, 2 Dec 47
- Ohio Air National Guard, c. 25 October 1950 (attached to 121st Fighter Wing)
- 155th Aircraft Control and Warning Group, in May 1951
- Ohio Air National Guard 1 July 52-1961
- 251st Cyberspace Engineering Installation Group (later 251st Mobile Communications Group, 251 Combat Information Systems Group, 251st Combat Communications Group, October 1952 – present

=== Gaining Command ===
- Tactical Air Command, 1952
- Air Force Communications Service, (later Air Force Communications Command, Air Force Information Systems Command, Air Force Communications Command), 16 March 1968
- Air Combat Command, 1 June 1992
- Air Force Space Command, 2010 – present

=== Stations ===
- Davis-Monthan Field, Arizona, c. March 42
- Gowen Field, Idaho
- Wendover Army Air Field, Utah
- Rapid City Army Air Field, South Dakota
- New York Port of Embarkation, June 1943–June 1943
- RAF Harrington, England
- Charleroi, France, February 1945
- England May 1945 – 4 December 1945
- Springfield State Armory, Ohio, 2 December 1947
- Springfield Air National Guard Base, Ohio, 1 July 1952 – present

=== Commanders ===
- Lt Col Brian S. Marshall (7 Nov 2021–Present)
- Lt Col Samantha J. Adducchio (3 June 2017 – 7 Nov 2021)
- Lt Col Bonnie L. Gamary (Feb 2017 – 3 June 2017)
- Lt Col Samantha J. Adducchio (Aug 2016 – Feb 2017)
- Lt Col Bonnie L. Gamary (1 April 2012 – Aug 2016)
- Lt Col William G. Robertson (28 Jan 2008 – 1 April 2012)
- Lt. Col John S. Hennessee (19 Sep 2006 – 27 Jan 2008)
- Maj William G. Robertson (1 Jun 2006 – 18 Sep 2006)
- Capt Steven C. Dudash (26 Jan 2006 – 31 May 2006)
- Lt Col Mark L Stout (31 Mar 1992 – 25 Jan 2006)
- Bobby L. Reed (19 May 1991 - 30 Mar 1992)
- William R. Reilly (12 Dec 1987 – 18 May 1991)
- Henry S. Youd (13 Apr 1987 – 12 Dec 1987)
- James B. Wiley (10 Jul 1984 – 12 Apr 1987)
- Robert E. Canter (10 Apr 1983 – 9 Jul 1984)
- William R. Soeller (1 Dec 1973 – 9 Apr 1983)
- Joseph A. McGuire (11 Jan 1972 – 30 Nov 1973)
- Richard E. Bennett (1 Apr 1968 – 10 Jan 1972)
- Herbert E. Moore (1 Jan 1965 – 31 Mar 1968)
- Clarence M. Flatter (23 Oct 1961 – 31 Dec 1964)
- Stanley T. Carter (17 Jan 1961 – 22 Oct 1961)
- Herbert E. Moore (17 Oct 1960 – 16 Jan 1961)
- David J. Rothery (6 Aug 1957 – 16 Oct 1960)
- Oris O. Trinkle (1 Apr 1955 – 5 Aug 1957)
- Davis E. Dean (12 Nov 1952 – 31 Mar 1955)
- Ramie E. Adams Jr. (1 May 1951 – 14 Nov 1952)
- Charles R. Stahl (18 Mar 1948 – 30 Apr 1951)
- William H. Brelsford (28 Jan 1948 – 17 Mar 1948)

=== Awards ===
Award streamer	Award	Dates	Notes
	Air Force Outstanding Unit Award	1 November 1971 – 31 December 1972	269th Mobile Communications Squadron
	Air Force Outstanding Unit Award	1 January 1980 – 31 December 1981	269th Combat Communications Flight
	Air Force Outstanding Unit Award	1 January 1984 – 31 December 1985	269th Combat Information Systems Squadron
	Air Force Outstanding Unit Award	1 January 1991 – 31 December 1992	269th Combat Communications Squadron
	Air Force Outstanding Unit Award	1 June 1994 – 31 May 1996	269th Combat Communications Squadron
	Air Force Outstanding Unit Award	1 April 1997 – 31 March 1999	269th Combat Communications Squadron

== See also ==
- 251st Combat Communications Group
- Ohio Air National Guard
