= 64th Cyberspace Squadron =

U.S. Space Force unit

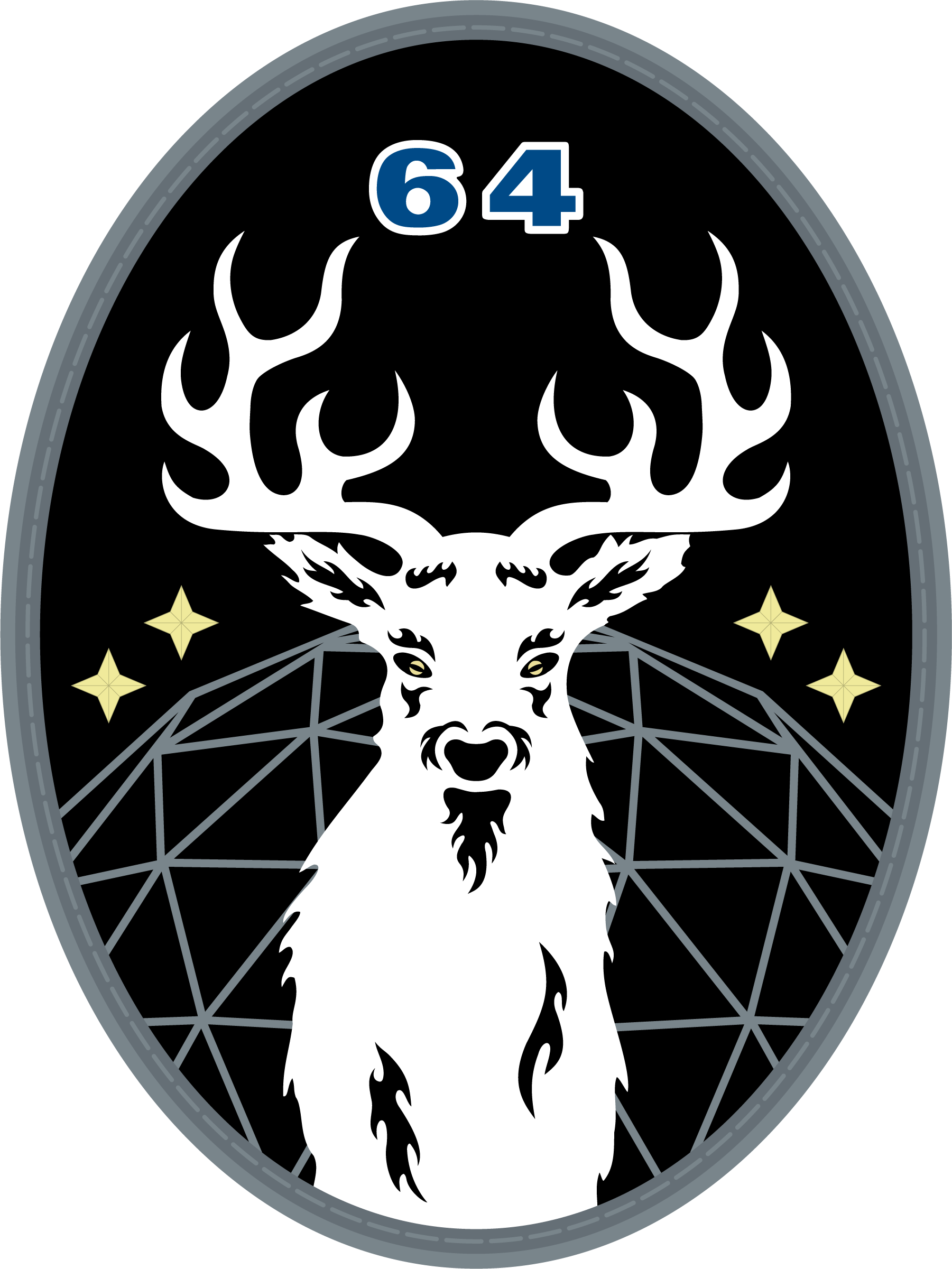
- 64 CYS emblem
- Active: before 2018–present
- Country: United States
- Branch: United States Space Force
- Type: Squadron
- Role: Cyber operations
- Part of: Space Delta 4
- Headquarters: Buckley Space Force Base, Colorado, U.S.

Commanders
- Commander: Lt Col Matthew Kahley

Insignia
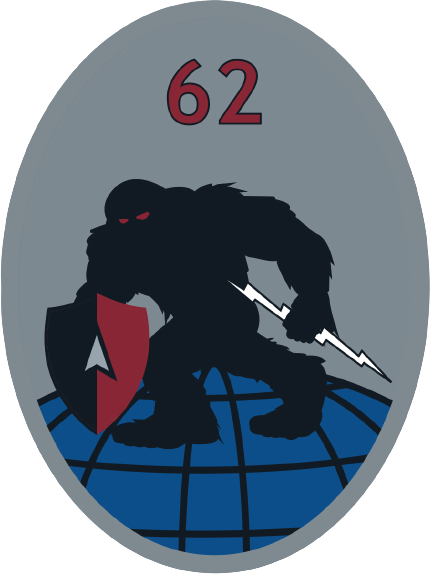
- Former 64th Cyberspace Squadron emblem

The 64th Cyberspace Squadron (64 CYS) is a United States Space Force unit under Space Delta 4 responsible for conducting defensive cyberspace operations in support of Space Delta 4's missile warning mission at Buckley Space Force Base, Colorado. It was formed by redesignating the 62nd Cyberspace Squadron to the 64 CYS on 6 January 2023. For many years in the past, as the 460th Space Communications Squadron, it was responsible for base communications support (computers, telephones) for Buckley. Those responsibilities were transferred to an Information Technology Flight in Space Base Delta 2. 460 SCS had a Detachment 1 not located at Buckley.

== Lineage ==
- Constituted 460th Communications Squadron, 26 April 2001
- Activated on 1 October 2001 at Buckley AFB
- Redesignated 460th Space Communications Squadron, 19 August 2004
- Redesignated 460th Communication Squadron, before October 2018
- Redesignated 460th Cyberspace Squadron, October 2018
- Redesignated 62nd Cyberspace Squadron, around 2020
- Redesignated 64th Cyberspace Squadron, 6 January 2023

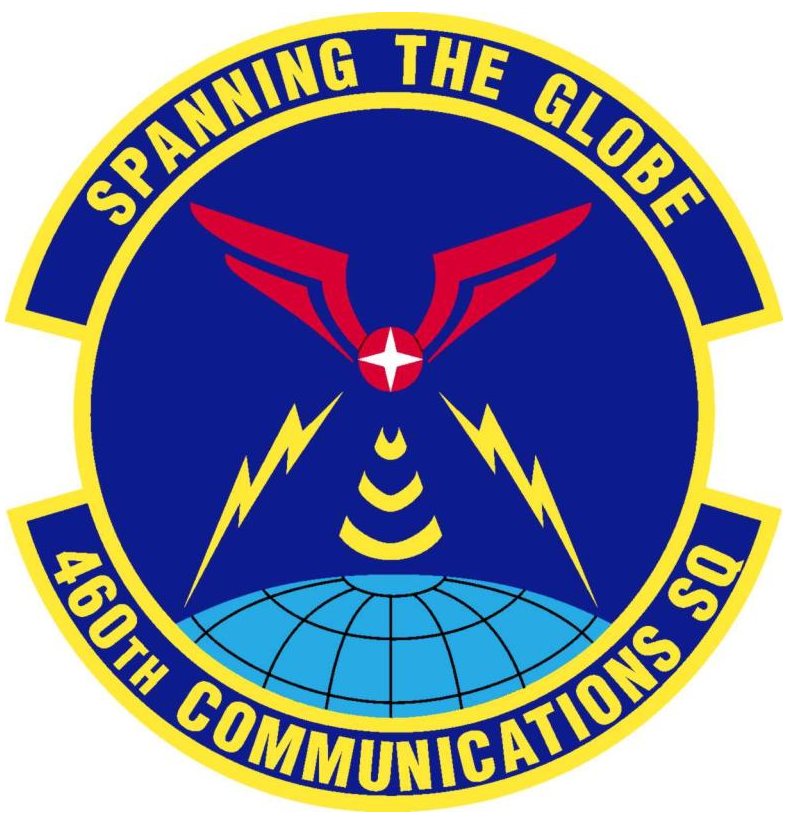
Emblem of 460 CS

== List of commanders ==
- Lt Col Kevin Nyberg, 2007 – 2009
- Lt Col Delbert Jones, 2009 – 2011
- Lt Col Kelly Kanapaux, 2011 – 2012
- Lt Col Hew Wells, 2012 – 17 July 2014
- Lt Col Christopher A. Kennedy, 17 July 2014 – August 2016
- Lt Col Erick Welcome, August 2016 – 28 June 2018
- Lt Col Travis Prater, 28 June 2018 – 2020
- Lt Col Raymond Brushier, 2020 – 2022
- Lt Col Scott Roberts, 3 June 2022 – 18 June 2024
- Lt Col Matthew Kahley, 18 June 2024 - present

== See also ==
- Space Delta 6
