= 263rd Combat Communications Squadron =

- Active: 1949-present
- Country: United States
- Branch: United States Air Force
- Part of: Air National Guard
- Garrison/HQ: Stanly County Air National Guard Station, North Carolina

The United States Air Force's 263rd Combat Communications Squadron (263 CCS) is a North Carolina Air National Guard combat communications unit located at the Stanly Air National Guard Station at Stanly County Airport in Albemarle, North Carolina.

== History ==
The squadron was allocated into the post-World War II U.S. Army Air Forces structure of the National Guard in 1946 but was not formed as an Air National Guard unit in the U.S. Air Force until January 1949 as part of the 118th Aircraft Control and Warning Squadron (118 AC&WS) in Charlotte, North Carolina. Detachment B (the Badin unit) and Detachment A (the Wadesboro unit) were reorganized in 1952 into the 263rd Communications Squadron (263 CS).

The squadron became a geographically separated unit (GSU) of the 251st Communications Group headquartered in Springfield, Ohio in 1954 and was re-designated the 263rd Mobile Communications Squadron in 1962. During the 1970s the squadron was again redesignated to its current title as the 263rd Combat Communications Squadron (263 CCS).

=== Mission ===
The Title 10 USC "federal" mission of the 263rd Combat Communications Squadron is to provide theater communications for the Commander of the United States Central Command (USCENTCOM).

== Assignments ==
In December 2018, members of the 263 CCS, a detachment of the North Carolina Air National Guard's 145th Airlift Wing (145 AW), were deployed to Williams Field at McMurdo Station, Antarctica participating as part of Operation Deep Freeze.

=== Major Command/Gaining Command ===
- Air National Guard/Air Combat Command (1992 - present)
- Air National Guard/Tactical Air Command (1949 - 1992)

== Bases stationed ==
- Charlotte, North Carolina (1949 - 1952)
- Stanly County ANGS, North Carolina (1952 - present)
