= 251st Cyberspace Engineering Installation Group =

251st Cyberspace Engineering Installation Group

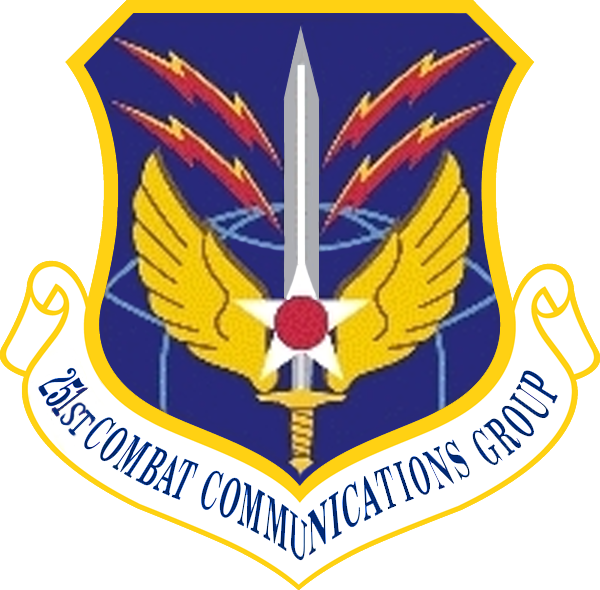
- 251st Cyberspace Engineering Installation Group emblem
- Active: 1952–present
- Country: United States
- Allegiance: Ohio Air National Guard
- Branch: United States Air Force
- Part of: Ohio Air National Guard
- Garrison/HQ: Springfield ANGB, Ohio
- Motto: The Oldest...The Boldest
- Mascot: Mercury the Messenger
- Anniversaries: 2 March 1952

Commanders
- Current commander: Colonel Steven Dudash
- Ceremonial chief: CMSgt Todd Fluegge

The United States Air Force's 251st Cyberspace Engineering Installation Group is an Air National Guard engineering installation unit located at Springfield ANGB, Ohio. It is the oldest communications/cyber group in the USAF and was originally chartered as the 251st Communications Group. The units assigned to the group compromise 47.5% of the USAF's Engineering Installation capability and 47.5% of Department of Defenses build and extend organic cyberspace infrastructure robust capability. The co-located 269th Combat Communications Squadron is also assigned to the 251st and is one of the USAF's oldest mobile communications squadrons rooted as the 1077th Signal Company Army Air Corps founded in March 1942. The group headquarters has 38 personnel assigned with a wartime mission to augment Major Command AFFOR staffs, Joint Force Commander staffs, Numbered Air Forces Warfighting Headquarters staffs or any Combatant Commanders cyber and Communications forward staff function.

== Mission ==
The mission of the 251st is to command, organize, equip, train and administer assigned and attached forces to ensure complete mission readiness in support of emergency United States Air Force requirements, and to provide timely and reliable communications engineering and installation in support of state emergencies.

== History ==
Headquarters, 251st Communications Group was constituted at Springfield, Ohio, on 5 October 1952. Commanded by Major Charles R. Stahl, the Headquarters had an initial strength of five people. Of the existing Air National Guard (ANG) communications groups and active duty group, the 251st is the oldest, and it is also the parent unit of two other ANG combat communications groups: The 226th Combat Communications Group in Alabama and the 254th Combat Communications Group in Texas. At its inception, the group had twelve subordinate units in Ohio, North Carolina, Missouri, Illinois, Texas, Alabama, and Arkansas. The mission of the 251st initially was a composite of the missions of today's Engineering – Installation Squadrons and Combat Communications Squadrons. While the organization was charged with providing, installing, operating, and maintaining communications equipment for deployed flying units, it did so from "scratch", with a greater variety of small components than today's relatively complete tactical capabilities. Beginning in 1953, the headquarters planned and directed Group-Wide Exercises at locations across the country, beginning with annual training at Stewart Air Force Base, New York, in August of that year. In 1954, the organization was authorized with its first full-time officer air technician: Capt (later Lt Col) Herbert E. Moore. In that year, the headquarters strength increased to nine officers and nine enlisted personnel. The 251st started remissioning into a Cyberspace Engineering Installation Group in 2010. The current mission of the 251st is to command, organize, equip, train and administer assigned and attached forces to ensure readiness in order to provide communications engineering and installation services to support emergency USAF requirements and to provide a staff element for management of Communications and Electronics (C-E) personnel when deployed in support of Air Force taskings.

To train for its wartime mission, the group has been deploying to exercises since 1976, with its first overseas exercise involvement occurring in 1978. Since its first deployment to these Joint Chiefs of Staff (JCS) and overseas exercises, the 251st has deployed personnel and equipment to Korea, the European Theater, the United States Southern Command, and to Southwest Asia. During Operation Desert Shield and Operation Desert Storm, the 251st provided over 1,500 workdays in voluntary direct support, both in the area of responsibility and in back-fill roles stateside.

Today, the 251st manages all ANG EI AEF and JCS Request for Forces (RFF) taskings, T10 and T32 workload for the ANG EI community. Currently, six partial mobilizations are underway moving forces to multiple areas of responsibility. Additionally, 100 or so projects are completed yearly at a 65% cost saving over non-organic blue-suit contractors.

== Assignments ==
=== Major Command/Gaining Command ===
- Air National Guard/Air Combat Command (2018–Present)
- Air National Guard/Air Force Space Command (2009–2018)
- Air National Guard/Air Combat Command (1992–2009)
- Air National Guard/Air Force Communications Command (1962–1992)

== Previous designations ==
- 251st Combat Communications Group (1952–2010)

== Squadrons assigned ==
- 269th Combat Communications Squadron - OH
- 130th Engineering Installation Squadron - UT
- 205th Engineering Installation Squadron - OK
- 210 Engineering Installation Squadron - MN
- 214th Engineering Installation Squadron - LA
- 219th Engineering Installation Squadron - OK
- 220th Engineering Installation Squadron - OH
- 272nd Engineering Installation Squadron - TX

== Stations ==
- Springfield ANGB, Ohio (1952–Present)

== Commanders ==
- Colonel Steven Dudash (2022–Present)
- Colonel Francisco Dominguez (2019–2022)
- Colonel Wade D. Rupper (2016–2019)
- Colonel Norman A. Poklar (2003 – 2016)
- Col Robert A. Meyer (1996–2003)
- Col William R. Reilly (1992–1996)
- Col Henry S. Youd (1989–1992)
- Col David F. Howard (1983–1989)
- Col Richard E. Bennett (1982–1983)
- Col Pasquale A. Gicale (1968–1982)
- Col Charles R. Stahl (1952–1968)

== Decorations ==
- Air Force Outstanding Unit Award
  - 2007, 2009, 2012, 2014, 2016, 2018
  - 2005
  - 1 Aug 1999-31 Jul 2001
  - 1 Apr 1997-31 Mar 1999
  - 1 Jan 1991-31 Dec 1993
  - 1987
  - 1982
  - 1975
  - 1973

== Awards ==
- NGAUS Non-Fly Most Outstanding Mission Support Unit Trophy (over 600 ANG mission support units are eligible to compete).
  - 2012, 2016, 2017, 2019
- NGAUS Distinguished Mission Support Plaque Award (Top 5 ANG units selected)
  - 2007, 2010, 2011, 2018
- Tappen Trophy for Most Outstanding Unit in the State of Ohio
  - 1980
- McClelland Award for Most Outstanding C-E Unit in the USAF
  - 1980
- ANG Info Dominance Major General Harold M. McClelland Large Unit of the Year, MAJCOM Winner (Large Unit - 126+)
  - 2010, 2011, 2012, 2013, 2014, 2015, 2016, 2018 and 2019
- Info Dominance: Major General Harold M. McClelland Large Unit of the Year, USAF Winner
  - 2020
- General Mark Welsh Team Award
  - 2011 for AFRL Radar Moves (USAF Runner-up)
- General Mark Welsh One Team Award Nominee
  - 2017 USSTRATCOM and 14AF
  - 2018 NGB
- Hungarian Defense Force Outstanding Unit Award
  - 1999
- NGB ANG Communications Systems Achievement Award
  - 1992
- Colonel Pasquale A. Gicale Outstanding Support Unit in the State of Ohio
  - 1990
  - 1995
  - 1996
  - 1997
  - 1999
  - 2003
  - 2006
  - 2007
  - 2008 (Award discontinued by OH ANG in 2008)
- Individual Readiness Award Geographically Separated Unit (GSU) in the State of Ohio
  - 2007
- Mission Readiness Award GSU in the State of Ohio
  - 2008
