= A-Space =

US Intelligence Community project

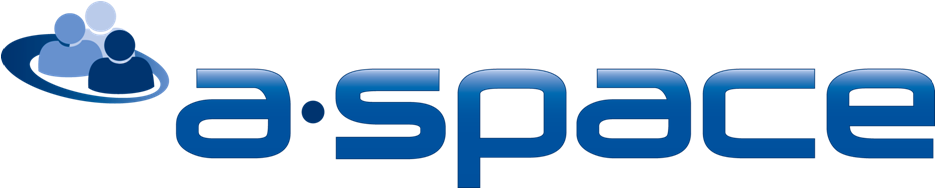
Logo

The United States Intelligence Community A-Space, or Analytic Space, is a project started in 2007 from the Office of the Director of National Intelligence's (ODNI) Office of Analytic Transformation and Technology to develop a common collaborative workspace for all analysts from the USIC. It is accessible from common workstations and provides unprecedented access to interagency databases, a capability to search classified and unclassified sources simultaneously, web-based messaging, and collaboration tools. The Defense Intelligence Agency (DIA) is the executive agent for building the first phase of A-Space. Initial operational capability was scheduled for December 2007. A-Space went live on the government's classified Joint Worldwide Intelligence Communications System 22 September 2008. A-Space is built on Jive Software's Clearspace application (which has been superseded by Jive's Social Business Software).

== Analytic transformation ==
The Director of National Intelligence has identified A-Space as a critical piece of "Analytic Transformation":

"Analytic Transformation seeks to change how we approach analysis, how we interact with our customers and each other, and is one of the principal priorities of the Director of National Intelligence. US Intelligence is engaged in a fundamental transformation of the Analysis mission at the national level."

Within the analytic transformation program, there are several initiatives under way in three areas:

1) enhancing the quality of analytic products,
2) managing the mission more effectively at a Community level, and
3) building more integrated analytic operations across the Intelligence Community (IC).

For contrast, see perceived limitations of CIA information technology at CIA Information Technology.

== Assumptions about improving collaboration among analysts ==
A-Space, according to Andrew McAfee of Harvard Business School, is a means of sharing information that, in the normal course of events, might not be seen at all. He pointed out that "companies that rely heavily on innovation" spend considerable effort improving the communications among close colleagues. Mark Granovetter's insight, "The Strength of Weak Ties" (SWT) was that strong ties are not enough for the best innovative environments. Strong ties between people arise from long-term, frequent, and sustained interactions; weak ties from infrequent and more casual ones. A tool such as Intellipedia or A-Space encourages collaboration among people with weak ties, complementing the traditional "team-building" and "cross-functional management" characteristic of strong ties.

"How do you transform analysis?" asked Thomas Fingar, deputy director of National Intelligence for Analysis at the Office of the Director of National Intelligence (ODNI). "One word: attitude. For people to collaborate and bring new and vital skills to the intelligence community, we need to change our attitude." Fingar said "60 percent of all U.S. intelligence analysts have five years' experience or less on the job. They expect to collaborate no matter where they are and without concern for chain of command," he said. "There is a sense of urgency, a push from the bottom that didn't exist before." Fingar said intelligence failures proved the need to transform intelligence analysis.

"Analysts have become risk-averse and because of that, many times that attitude precludes good analysis," Fingar said. "We have had more than one major problem every decade since Pearl Harbor. We fail because we are not willing to collaborate or accept the risks of collaboration."

== Security ==
A-Space is open to all 16 elements of the U.S. Intelligence Community.

The first requisite for such a system is that it be secure. To minimize the complexity of the first release, the initial operating capability (IOC) is Web based rather than a full desktop client. Information Week stated that A-Space must have 16 different security waivers and move across 16 differently configured firewalls. However, all this information in the browser, even on the secure intelligence Intranet, is bound to raise hackles, presumably for the 16 Intelligence Community agencies, according to Mike Wertheimer, assistant deputy director of national intelligence for analytic transformation and technology.

Even though the system will be available only to users with security clearance for TOP SECRET Sensitive compartmented intelligence (SCI), security, in the world of intelligence, is not a simple matter of clearance. Individual users will be authorized, or not authorized to access specific "compartments". For example, while an analyst might be authorized access to the HUMINT Control System, a major category of SCI, that does not necessarily allow an analyst working on Russia to see data on spies in Somalia. Somalian and Russian information, sometimes down to the granularity of individual spy contributions, are in separate compartments.

Information Week pointed out that at these security levels, the users themselves need to be monitored. One of the ways A-Space will maintain its security will be through observing traffic patterns, the department doing things like looking out for suspiciously anomalous searches. "Let's not be Pollyanna-ish about this," Wertheimer said. "This is a counter-intelligence nightmare. You've got to ask yourself, if there's one bad apple here, how much can that bad apple learn?"

In many cases, an analyst will have to request access to a new compartment or specific piece of information. It is hoped that this process will be speeded by the web-based services.

== Content ==
To ensure its usefulness, the project will launch with access to the three large databases of current intelligence and Intellipedia. Eventually, A-Space will be capable of carrying documents several levels above Top Secret, certified at a level that 95% of all intelligence can be stored there. Reports will be able to be tagged with important related words or phrases via a system called TagConnect and labeled by usefulness. It will eventually be able to recommend related documents to analysts, much like Amazon recommends related books.

=== The Library of National Intelligence ===
The Library of National Intelligence (LNI) is an ODNI project to create a repository of all Intelligence Community disseminated intelligence, regardless of classification. The Central Intelligence Agency is the executive agent for this project. The Library's electronic card catalog – containing summary information for each report – will be classified at the lowest possible level, permitting analysts to discover everything that has been published by the Intelligence Community (IC) regardless of the original classification of the document. Analysts will be able to request the products in accordance with individual access levels and security guidelines. Services provided by LNI will include the ability to request information directly from producers, qualitative measures of value, and statistics on Community coverage of priorities.

One of the components of the LNI is the CIA WIRe, which went into operation on 7 September 2007. It takes all the agency's intelligence information and makes it available to CIA analysts in one database. According to Gus Hunt, CIA executive agent for LNI, the full LNI became available on 31 October 2007.

"It boggles my mind that it took so long to understand the concept of bringing together all the community knowledge to use effectively," Hunt said. "DNI will let users on the top-secret network share information that was agreed to be released. We now will know [all that] we know about any topic."
Dale Meyerrose, ODNI's chief information officer, said LNI will make all information discoverable [i.e., through weak links], and that is just the starting point. "The pedigree we need to add to data and discovery is huge. It is larger than LNI. The finished product must include intelligence information and open-source information."

=== Social networking ===
In a compartmented environment, analysts may be unaware they have a counterpart, in another IC agency, working on a related problem, and they could assist one another. This is equally true of intelligence consumers; a policymaker might be aware of a CIA report of interest, but not one from the State Department's Bureau of Intelligence and Research. Indeed, both analysts and consumers may be unaware of the common interests.

Social networking will be another critical part of A-Space, where analysts can create trusted contacts with other analysts and post profiles that contain updated contact information and details of their areas of expertise. The analysts' areas of expertise may be further defined through text mining software that sifts through analyst e-mail. The social networking model isn't yet set, but the DNI has invited social networking experts the likes of Facebook CEO Mark Zuckerberg and vendors to recommend and help develop specs.

Again, social networking supports interaction through weak links.

=== Similar architectures ===
The Force Protection Assessment system uses a similar architecture to provide knowledge management and real-time updates on operational security analyses.

The need is not only seen at top executive levels. According to Tim Hsia, a United States Army captain, "Market trackers absorb information continuously, rigorously track trends, and enable traders to formulate decisions based on the latest news combined with historical data. The ability of market trackers to store and quickly recall historical data should be mimicked by the U.S. government". Hsia mentioned that the needs for intelligence, by operational military units, are not being met in Iraq and Afghanistan. "Expanding this network to encompass a more centralized program of data sharing would not require any additional hardware. A fusion of geography and intelligence within a centralized network can ensure that commanders arrive at any location with the necessary intelligence derived from years of work by previous agencies and military units that have already provided a framework for understanding the enemy and the people in his assigned area. Commanders could then be spared the countless man hours recollecting data that has already been captured thru blood, sweat, and tears [captured by weakly linked researchers]"

He describes the field need for a database:

A geointel, i.e. geospatial intelligence, database should include all agencies of the U.S. government and also extend to coalition partners. ... only cleared individuals and organizations can access certain intelligence products. The end state would be to encompass each city in the world from South America, Asia, and the Middle East. Each city in the geointel database would comprise of an abundance of historical data consisting of analysis, logistical, intelligence products, and operational summaries from all branches of the military, the State Department, Environmental Protection Agency (EPA), CIA, and National Security Agency. Moreover, the geointel database would incorporate cutting open source intelligence (OSINT) products produced by news agencies, RAND, and other think tanks. By combining products from different branches within the government it would ensure that policy makers from different agencies would have a complete portrait of their region and thus prevent decisions based on data comprised [sic] solely from their agency ...

This fusion of intelligence would not have to be centrally managed and each commander or diplomat could individually assign and weigh different parameters and factors internally within his staff when deciding amongst several courses of action. Intelligence could be pushed down to the lowest level which would then facilitate bottom-up refinement as each new unit that was involved in a certain locale could update the existing data to include their latest experiences. The battlefield commander, diplomat, or United States Army Special Forces SF ODA (Operational Detachment-Alpha) team leader could then make informed military, foreign affairs, or political decisions that produce more effective results because the data retrieved from the geointel site would provide them with the latest ground truth supplemented with historic data.

... The structure of the site should provide ease of accessibility while also compartmentalizing information so that only certain areas can be accessed by individuals depending upon their level of clearance. There would need to be a thorough security vetting process to prohibit individuals from being able to achieve sensitive information outside of their region, scope, and responsibility. ... An additional safeguard would be to have superiors and agencies to proof and screen all intelligence products posted by their subordinates so that faulty and inaccurate reporting could be stunted before other organizations implemented inaccurate information .. .readers could ... view the analyst's oeuvre, credentials, and security levels and also allow the reader to directly contact the author as to their assumptions and inquire about related issues pertaining to an intelligence product.

Hsia points out that while SIPRNET (i.e., operating at the SECRET security level, not the higher intelligence levels) is widely available, "Expanding this network to encompass a more centralized program of data sharing would not require any additional hardware", but software changes in the devices now used to access SIPRNET. Depending on the operational needs, it might be necessary to have additional access points. Typically, only the intelligence staff of a command has access to intelligence data above the SECRET level, just as only the operational staff have access to TOP SECRET mission planning.

== Cost ==
Michael Wertheimer emphasized working with small prototypes at first, which are likely to demonstrate failures. If the prototype is small enough that a new version, which addresses the failure, is not expensive, incremental improvement would be the way to control costs. He mentioned that the initial costs, "well under $5 million", will be for servers, software licenses and design. The greatest design challenge will be achieving the needed security. DNI policy is to have A-Space rely, as much as possible, on commercial off-the-shelf (COTS) software.

A service oriented architecture (SOA) was the basic technical mode for building A-space. Eventually, that will allow analysts and developers to write or install their own widgets (i.e., small customized programs) onto their portal page. Widgets might first access Google Maps content, then attach classified layers to a map that could potentially overlay anti-aircraft missile sites with known bunkers. The intelligence community is already blogging, and A-Space could therefore take advantage of RSS feeds for blog content, among other things.

It will be implemented as a portal that includes a Web-based word processing tool akin to GoogleDocs, a wiki-based intelligence community encyclopedia and access to three "huge, terabyte databases" of "raw" (i.e., not yet evaluated) data for analysts to examine. It will be scaled for 10,000 users at day one.

== Recognition and awards ==
- Named one of Time magazine's Best Inventions of 2008 (#32)
- Government Computer News success stories, 2009

== See also ==
- Diplopedia
- DoDTechipedia
- Intellipedia
- Intellipublia
- Bureaupedia – FBI's online encyclopedia
