= 33rd Combat Communications Squadron =

33d Combat Communications Squadron
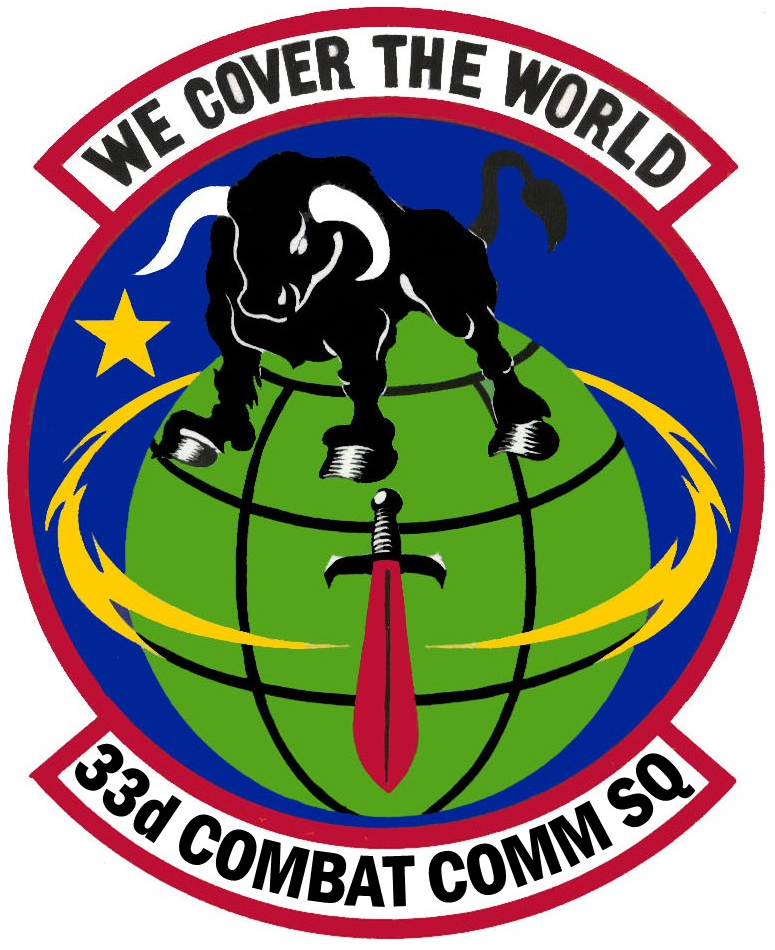
- 33d Combat Communications Squadron Emblem
- Active: 1950–2013
- Country: United States
- Branch: United States Air Force
- Role: Tactical communications
- Size: Squadron
- Part of: Air Force Space Command/ 3d Combat Communications Group
- Garrison/HQ: Tinker AFB, Oklahoma
- Mottos: "Mess with the Bull, Get the Horns"
- Colors: Blue

Commanders
- Current commander: Capt. Matthew W. Meckes

The 33d Combat Communications Squadron (33 CCS) was a United States Air Force combat communications squadron, located at Tinker AFB. They deployed quality communications-computer systems and air traffic services for military operations and emergency missions under hostile and base conditions anytime, anywhere. The 33d CCS was inactivated as part of the overall inactivation of the 3 CCG (Combat Communications Group) in May 2012. In January 2013 the 33d was unofficially merged with the 31st CCS as part of the inactivation proceedings. The unit is expecting to be completely inactivated no later than October 2013.

== Mission ==
Provide engineering team and expeditionary communications to support advance, the initial reception of forces, and "reach forward" key personnel deployment. Provide communications infrastructure to activate and robust two air expeditionary wings (AEW) with maximum boots on the ground of 3,000 persons each. Provide deployed base information infrastructure across the full spectrum of operations. Provide connectivity for base infrastructure and from base infrastructure to theatre information infrastructure. Provide power and environmental control where these services are not available from host or wing civil engineering. Provide theatre-level services, including global broadcast system tactical receive suite, line of sight, and intra-theatre information infrastructure. Provide air traffic control services to one AEW.

== History ==
The 33d has been a part of the 3d Combat Communications Group since its re-inception as a unit in 1988. The 33d has deployed in support of missions throughout both conflicts in the Mid East, including direct support of operations Iraqi Freedom and New Dawn. The 33d has provided reliable deployable communications and tactical airfield and air traffic control support for more than two decades.

In May 2012, the 33d and all of its sister squadrons and command group slated for inactivation in the fiscal year 2013.

== Assignments ==
=== Major Command ===
- Tactical Air Command/Air Combat Command (1990–2009)
- Air Force Space Command (2009–2013)

=== Wing/Group ===
- 3d Combat Communications Group (1988–2013)

== Previous designations ==
- None

== Bases stationed ==
- Tinker AFB, Oklahoma (1988–2013)

== Commanders ==
- Maj Roy "Chip" Brown July (1988–1989)
- Capt John Haven (1989–1992)
- Lt Col James Cresta (1992–1994)
- Lt Col Frank K. Brooks
- Lt Col Kurt Klausner
- Lt Col Beau Buder (1997–1998)
- Lt Col Edward Keegan July (1998–2000)
- Lt Col Mark Langenderfer
- Lt Col Amy Dayton
- Lt Col Paula Gregory July (2004–2006)
- Maj. Terrence Adams (2006–2008)
- Maj. Jennifer Hlavaty July (2008– )
- Lt. Col Yashua Gustafson (2010–2012)
- Capt. Matthew W. Meckes (2012–2013)

== Decorations ==
- Campaign Streamers. Southwest Asia: Defense of Saudi Arabia; Liberation and Defense of Kuwait.
- Air Force Outstanding Unit Awards: 1 May 1990 – 30 Apr 1992; 1 Apr 1992 – 31 Mar 1994; 1 Apr – 31 Dec 1994; 1 Jan 1995 – 31 May 1996; 1 Jun 1996 – 31 May 1997; 1 Jun 1999 – 31 May 2001; 1 Jun 2001 – 31 May 2002.
- Meritorious Unit Award: 1 Jun 2008 – 31 May 2009.

== See also ==
- 3d Combat Communications Group
- 31st Combat Communications Squadron
- 32nd Combat Communications Squadron
- 34th Combat Communications Squadron
