= ISCO =

ISCO or Isco may refer to:

- Innermost stable circular orbit, the smallest stable orbit around a black hole
- International Standard Classification of Occupations, an International Labour Organization (ILO) classification structure
- Information Sharing Customer Outreach, a directorate within the office of the Chief Information Officer (CIO) under the Office of the Director of National Intelligence (ODNI) of the U.S.A.
- In situ chemical oxidation, a way to remediate organic contamination below the ground surface by direct injection of oxidants
- Isco (born 1992), Spanish footballer
- ISCO (videogame developer) (Japanese: イスコ, lit. 'Intelligent System Corporation'), Japan
- ISCO Optics of Göttingen, Sweden, maker of lenses etc. such as Iscorama
- ISCO Championship, a golf tournament in the United States
