= MilSuite =

milSuite
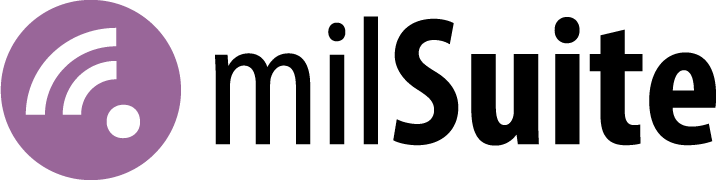
- Official logo for milSuite
- Website type: Professional Networking
- Owner: none1
- Website: www.milsuite.mil
- Commercial: no
- Registration: Required and restricted to DoD personnel
- Users: 1 million
- Launched: October 15, 2009; 16 years ago
- Current status: active

milSuite, launched in October 2009 by the U.S. Army PEO EIS milTech Solution office, is a collection of online applications designed to enhance secure collaboration for the United States Department of Defense. With a served user base of 2.21 million, milSuite is one of the largest networks for personal information sharing across the joint-domain. milSuite comprises ten applications, with its five primary applications being milBook, milWiki, milTube, milUniversity and milSurvey.

A decision was made by the Army Chief Information Officer and Army Deputy Chief of Staff G6 on 26 February to sunset milSuite on 30 March. The date was extended to 30 April 2025. In light of this decision, the Army has released an article called, "Army to Sunset milSuite Platform.".

== Applications ==
The core applications within milSuite were launched as a collection of connected sites focused on open-source software to create DoD-audience exclusive versions of popular social media and public websites such as Wikipedia, Facebook, YouTube, Skillshare, and LimeSurvey. Each applications provides a unique set of information-sharing tools that are significant communication vehicles across the joint domain.

=== milWiki ===
milWiki is a knowledge management system like Wikipedia. It operates within a secure firewall accessible only to individuals with a DoD Public Key Infrastructure (PKI) certificate. Subject matter experts contribute to diverse topics, creating living collections of articles on milWiki to enhance organizational readiness in one centralized platform.

=== milBook ===
Launched in October 2009, milBook, powered by JIVE SBS, serves as milSuite's professional networking tool. It fosters connections among military personnel across DoD branches, while facilitating communication for cross-functional teams in common operating environment. This enhances the military community and promotes the sharing of relevant and mission critical information.

=== milTube ===
In October 2010, milSuite launched milTube, a professional alternative to YouTube, focusing on military training and education. milTube allows Army or DoD members to share videos for viewing, downloading, or embedding within the DoD. Videos range from official content to ad-hoc productions, offering features like closed captioning and the ability to upload transcripts.

=== milUniversity ===
milSuite introduced milUniversity in March 2013, an online training tool facilitating the creation and distribution of learning materials. This platform supports military personnel in accessing and completing training course for certification in a secure environment, proving crucial for military talent management and human resource personnel.

=== milSurvey ===
milSurvey enables the creation and distribution of custom surveys with advance statistics for secure information collection. This application was created in August 2017, and is the approved survey tool in the Army, adhering to strict information sharing protocols outline in Army regulation 25-98, offering a secure platform to replace unsecured survey tools and mitigate potential security issues.

milSuite includes additional applications such as Eureka, milAdvisor, milReads, milSuiteX, and Form Builder. Eureka is a part of the milBook application since its launch in July 2012. It operates independently and uses ideation to facilitate discussions with the intent to bring about solutions within the military's workface. milAdvisor allows users to recommend trips, similar to trip advisor, while milReads is a platform for sharing and discussing books. milSuite X is an milSuite extension shaped by user contributions, encouraging innovations and idea to address military challenges. Additionally, FormBuilder is a tool where users can create full featured input forms on milBook.

In 2013, milSuite executed a major release with updates to its core products and a change in the application lineup, re-purposing its WordPress site as milWire. milWire, which has been removed by milSuite, was designed to be an aggregator of news and information from across milSuite and the public web. It allowed users to share original short blog posts or content from anywhere across the other milSuite sites into specific user and topic-based feeds, which other users of milSuite can then subscribe to or follow.

== Creation and Usage ==
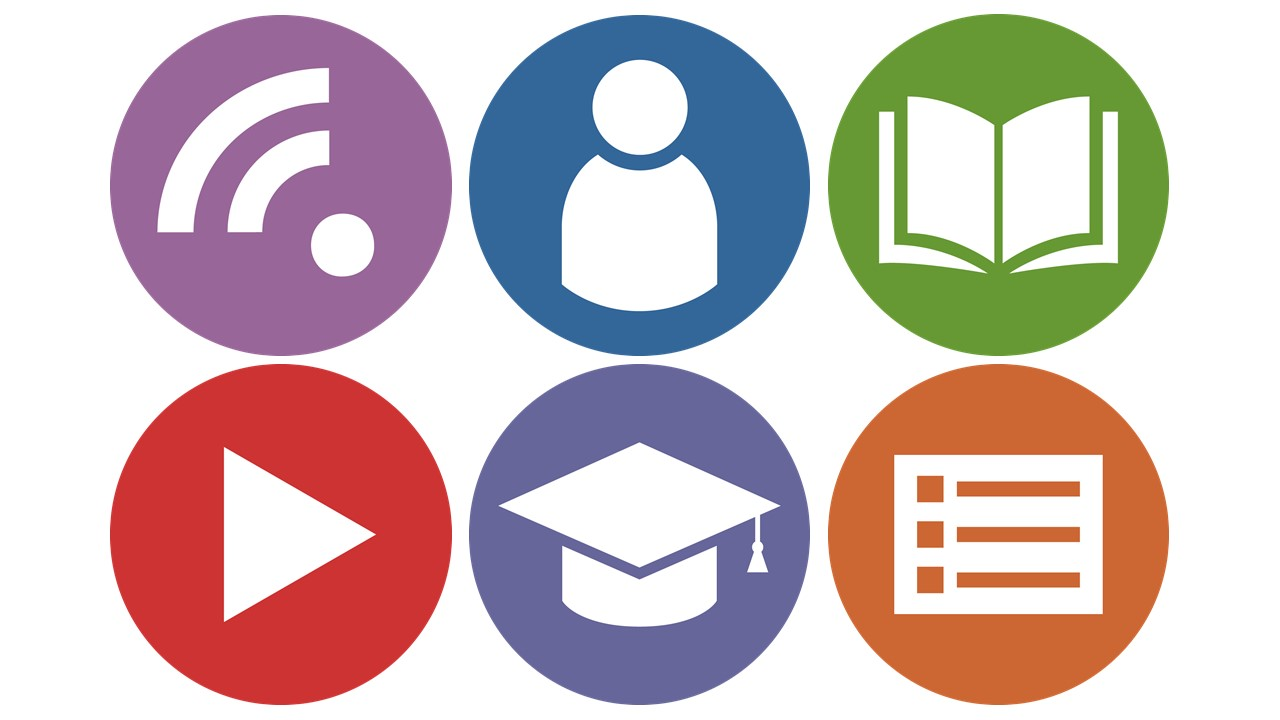
Individual icons for milSuite and its five major applications.

The milSuite product line grew out of a need for new knowledge management solutions for an Army workforce at Fort Monmouth, N.J., which was expected to lose a significant number of personnel due to the announcement of Base Realignment and Closure, 2005. Original use of an internal MediaWiki and internal WordPress site from 2007-08 focused on building and updating living knowledge archives, the expertise of departing leaders and the specialized knowledge of subject matter experts.

milBook was launched in the fall of 2009 to provide "a centralized location for Army personnel to discuss military topics that were previously done through potentially insecure emails, chats, wikis and blogs." The former, stand-alone MediaWiki and WordPress offerings were named milWiki and milBlog and joined with milBook to create milSuite.

The military has leveraged milSuite for several significant collaborative efforts since its launch. The United States Army Training and Doctrine Command begin using milWiki in 2010 to create online versions of field manuals in a wiki format, that could be contributed to by any soldier. The United States Army Forces Command partnered with milSuite in 2011 to develop a customized Virtual Training Portal for Soldiers using milWiki and milTube. In 2013, milBook was a key component in an initiative by the United States Air Force's Air Mobility Command to host and conduct conferences and courses virtually as a cost-cutting measure.

On October 3, 2016, the Army Office of Business Transformation launched Army Ideas for Innovation (AI2) as a replacement for the Army Suggestion Program (ASP), which was suspended in 2013. Created at the direction of the United States Under Secretary of the Army, AI2 is a crowd-source innovation program built on the milSuite platform.

The United States Air Force launched its own idea submission site for Airmen on milSuite in May 2017. The website, which directly supported Air Force Chief of Staff Gen. David L. Goldfein's Focus Area number one – Revitalizing Air Force Squadrons, encouraged Airmen to address specific topics presented in the form of challenges and to help identify the best ideas by voting, commenting and sharing.

milSuite was featured as a secure alternative to public social media for Department of Defense collaboration at the Defense Information School's 2017 Social Media Workshop.

== Contributors ==
milSuite is accessible to active military personnel, DoD civilian employees, and contractor employees, representing the Army, Navy, Marine Corps, Air Force, Space Force, and Coast Guard. The community, which includes participants at all levels of employment and military rank - from government interns to general officers - registered its 350,000th user in September 2013.

== Army Convergence ==
Within the framework of the Army Roadmap, milSuite actively participates in the broader concept of Army Convergence. This aligns with the Army's goals of digital transformation, placing a strong emphasis on enhancing communication and information sharing. As outlined in the Unified Network Plan, milSuite contributes significantly to the development of a unified and cohesive military network.

== Cloud Migration History ==
On May 23, 2018, milSuite executed a major update and migration from their traditional hosting environment to the DISA milCloud environment. The migration allowed milSuite to be more agile as a service with the ability to scale as necessary to support a growing number of users while simultaneously keeping maintenance costs low.

milSuite successfully underwent another major migration to the cArmy Cloud on August 25, 2023. This migration brings numerous long-term benefits to the milSuite program, encompassing both technical and strategic advantages. It positions milSuite to leverage cutting edge technologies that did not exist prior. These advancements will enhance the overall program and improve the user experience.

== Awards and recognition ==
In 2009, milWiki received a Category III: Technology Dimension Army Knowledge Management Award, at the Army's annual LandwarNet Conference, in Fort Lauderdale, Fla.

At the following year's LandWarNet conference, in 2010, milBook claimed the top Army Knowledge Management award.

milWiki was the supporting application for the U.S. Training and Doctrine Command's (TRADOC) U.S. Army Field Manual Wiki project, which was recognized by the White House administration in 2010 as an Open Government Initiative.

In 2011, Government Computer News named milSuite one of its honorable mentions in the program's 24th Annual agency awards for information technology initiatives.

milSuite was featured in the Fall 2023 Publication of USAASC's Army AL&T professional journal

== Historic Milestones ==
- Army Team C4ISR Blog and Wiki launched: February 2008 and June 2008
- milWiki wins Army Knowledge Management Award: August 2009
- milBook launched birth of milSuite brand: October 2009
- milTube Launched: June 2010
- milBook wins Army Knowledge Management Award: August 2010
- milWiki Recognized as a White House Open Government Initiative: September 2010
- milsuite.mil address memo from DONCIO: December 2010
- Expansion to other services and use of the enterprise directory (milSuite Enterprise Edition): February 2011
- GCN named milSuite one of its honorable mentions in the program's 24th Annual agency awards: October 2011
- CAC Only milSuite: December 2011
- milSuite registers 200,000 member: March 2012
- GCDS: June 2012
- Gold Master Trusted Sites: July 2012
- eureka launched: July 2012
- DA CIO/G6 support (Funding and direct): September 2012
- milWire Launched: January 2013
- Army/DISA Direction from Army/DISA day to move forward with partnership: January 2013
- Army Professional Forums migrate to milBook: March 2013
- Original milUniversity to support milSuite products was released: March 2013
- milSuite was realigned into the EIEMA Domain under US Army CIO/G-6: May 2013
- milSuite registers 350,000 member: September 2013
- DISA DECC FOC: October 2013
- First milSuite-DCO Virtual Conference: November 2013
- 500K user: January 2015
- COOP IOC: June 2015
- Initial DoD Mobility (sent icons and ready with products): September 2015
- milSuite IATO: 27 August 2015
- milSuite ATO: 27 January 2016
- AI2 becomes a Program of Record: 14 December 16
- CSAF Launches CSAF Revitalizing Squadrons: 15 May 17
- SMA Announces AI2: 9 June 17
- milSurvey Released: 30 June 17
- milUniversity Released: 30 June 17
- 1M user registered for milSuite since DoD wide milSuite was released in 2011: 19 December 17
- milSuite will sunset on 30 April 25

== See also ==
- A-Space
- DoDTechipedia
- Intelink
- RallyPoint
- Social Software
