= 34th Combat Communications Squadron =

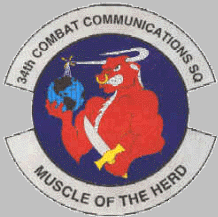
- 34th Combat Communications Squadron emblem
- Active: 1993–2013
- Country: United States
- Branch: United States Air Force
- Part of: Air Force Space Command/3d Combat Communications Group
- Garrison/HQ: Tinker AFB, Oklahoma

The 34th Combat Communications Squadron (34 CBCS) was a United States Air Force combat communications squadron, located at Tinker AFB.

== History ==
The unit emblem was designed by SrA Steve Carter in 1995, who would later go on to retire as a TSgt. SrA Carter was tasked to draft something without direction, "Carter, you're an artist. We need an idea for an emblem by end of day." The artist had been reading Robert E. Howard's Conan the Barbarian books that week and, on short notice, drafted the emblem in a rough form and submitted it that day. The emblem consisted of a black anthropomorphic bull wielding a broadsword in one hand and holding a globe in the other. The broadsword originally broke out from the border, which is not allowed in Air Force heraldry.

By popular vote, the squadron chose this design over others submitted. It would later morph into its final version with a red bull.

== Assignments ==
=== Major Command ===
- Air Force Space Command (2009 – 2013)
- Air Combat Command (1993 – 2009)

=== Wing/Group ===
- 689th Combat Communications Wing (2009 – 2013)
- 3d Combat Communications Group (1993 – 2013)

== Previous designations ==
- 34th Combat Communications Squadron (1993 – 2013)

== Bases stationed ==
- Tinker AFB, Oklahoma (1993 – 2013)

== Commanders ==
- Maj Mark Smith (1993–1995)
- Maj Singleton (1995–1997)
- Lt Col Dick Palmieri (2003–2005)
- Lt Col Steve Sweeney (2005–2007)
- Maj Anthony Gamboa (2007–2009)
- Maj Noland Greene (2009–2011)
- Lt Col Shelly Prescod (2011–2012)
- Lt Col Anthony Montelepre (2012 – 2013)

== Decorations ==
- Air Force Outstanding Unit Award
- Meritorious Unit Commendation

== See also ==
- 3d Combat Communications Group
