= Intellipedia =

US Intelligence Community encyclopedia

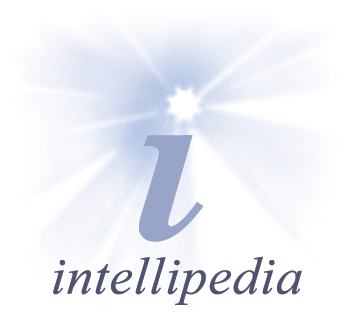
Logo

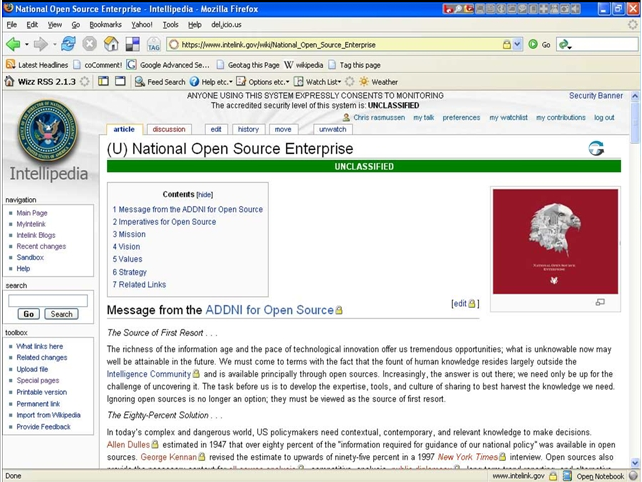
A screenshot of the Intellipedia interface

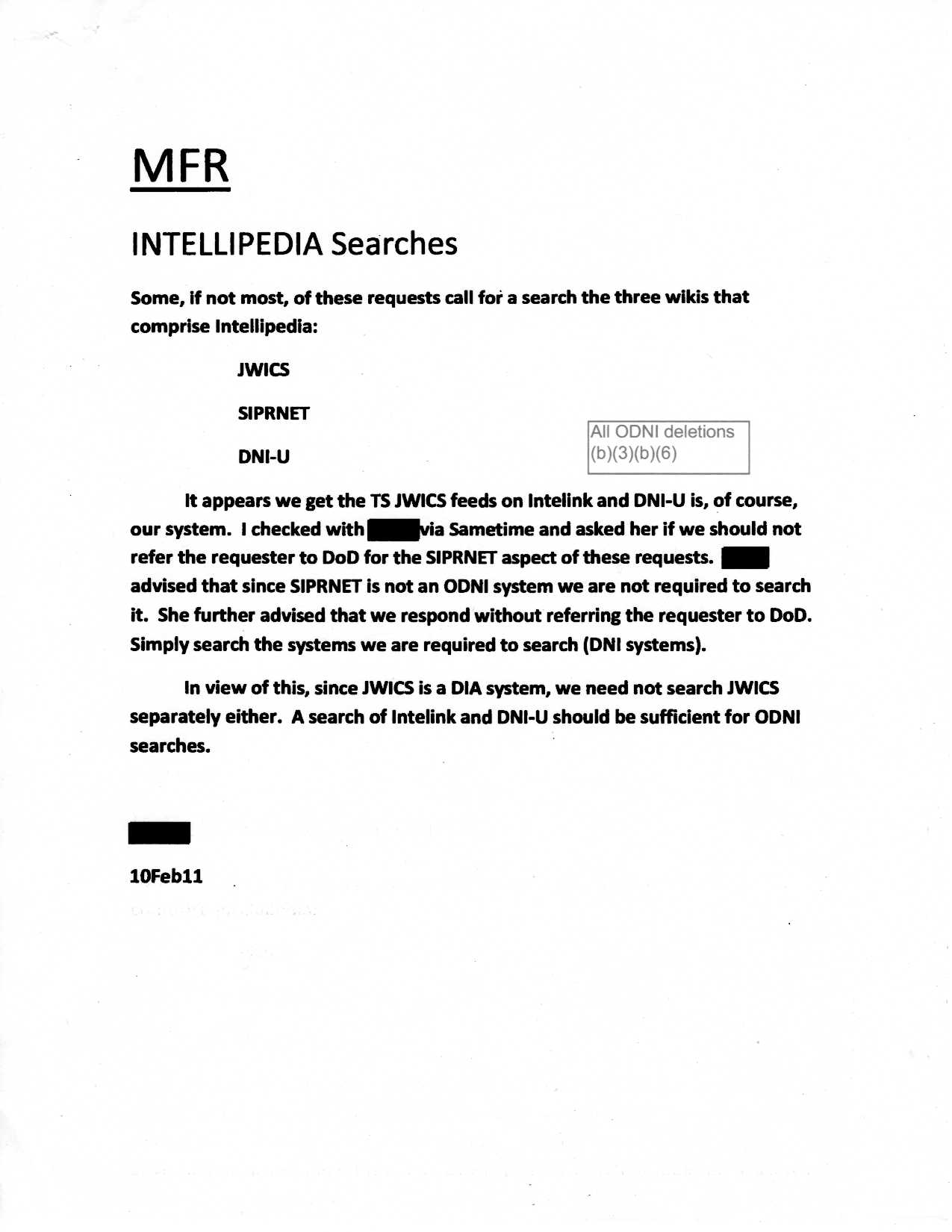
The three wikis that make up Intellipedia

Intellipedia is an online system for collaborative data sharing used by the United States Intelligence Community (IC). It was established as a pilot project in late 2005 and formally announced in April 2006. Intellipedia consists of three wikis running on the separate JWICS (Intellipedia-TS), SIPRNet (Intellipedia-S), and DNI-U (Intellipedia-U) networks. The levels of classification allowed for information on the three wikis are Top Secret Sensitive Compartmented Information (TS SCI), Secret (S), and Sensitive But Unclassified (SBU or FOUO) information, respectively. Each of the wikis is used by individuals with appropriate clearances from the 18 agencies of the IC and other national-security related organizations, including Combatant Commands and other federal departments. The wikis are not open to the public.

Intellipedia is a project of the Office of the Director of National Intelligence (ODNI) Intelligence Community Enterprise Services (ICES) office headquartered in Fort Meade, Maryland. It includes information on the regions, people, and issues of interest to the communities using its host networks. Intellipedia uses MediaWiki, the same software used by the Wikipedia free-content encyclopedia project. In contrast to Wikipedia, its intelligence analogue encourages editing that incorporates personal points of view regardless of rank as it was decided that, "much of the self-corrective knowledge in the Intelligence Community resides in personal points of view," and that "not all good ideas originate at the top."

The Secret version connected to SIPRNet serves the personnel of the Departments of Defense and of State, many of whom do not use the Top Secret JWICS network on a day-to-day basis. Users on unclassified networks can access Intellipedia from remote terminals outside their workspaces via a VPN, in addition to their normal workstations. Open Source Intelligence (OSINT) users share information on the unclassified Intelink-U wiki.

== History ==
Intellipedia was created to share information on difficult subjects facing U.S. intelligence and to bring cutting-edge technology into its workforce. It also allows information to be assembled and reviewed by a variety of sources and agencies in order to address concerns that pre-war intelligence did not include robust dissenting opinions on Iraq's alleged weapons programs. A number of projects are underway to explore the use of Intellipedia for the creation of traditional Intelligence Community products. In the summer of 2006, Intellipedia was the main collaboration tool in constructing a National Intelligence Estimate on Nigeria.

Intellipedia was at least partially inspired by a paper written for the Galileo Award (an essay competition set up by the CIA and later taken over by the DNI), which encouraged any employee at any intelligence agency to submit new ideas to improve information sharing. The first essay selected was by Calvin Andrus, chief technology officer of the Center for Mission Innovation at the CIA, entitled "The Wiki and the Blog: Toward a Complex Adaptive Intelligence Community". Andrus' essay argued that the power of the Internet had come from the boom in self-publishing, and noted how Wikipedia's open-door policy allowed it to cover new subjects quickly.

The original version was developed in beta form in late 2004 by technologists at the Defense Intelligence Agency, adapting MediaWiki open-source software for deployment on the DIA-managed JWICS SCI network. In 2005 DIA officials arranged to transfer the software and content to community-wide management under ODNI auspices, to increase the system's utility and comprehensiveness. Richard A. Russell, Deputy Assistant Director of National Intelligence for Information Sharing Customer Outreach (ISCO) said it was created so "analysts in different agencies that work X or Y can go in and see what other people are doing on subject X or Y and add in their two cents worth or documents that they have. What we are after here is 'decision superiority', not 'information superiority.'"

In 2007, after sixteen months of being available across the entire community, it was noted by officials that the top-secret version of Intellipedia alone (hosted on JWICS) had 29,255 articles, with an average of 114 new articles and more than 6,000 article edits added each workday.

As of 2009, the overall Intellipedia project hosted 900,000 pages edited by 100,000 users, with 5,000 page edits per day. As of 2014, Intellipedia contained around 269,000 articles with the Top Secret Intellipedia counting 113,000 content pages with 255,000 users.

During the last weeks of the Obama administration, a large amount of information about the investigation into Russian election interference was dumped on the site. It was hoped that the site would prevent information on the topic to be "swept under a rug" by the incoming Trump administration and serve as "breadcrumbs" for congressional investigators.

=== 10 years later ===
A 2017 two-part Wired series on Intellipedia and reported that, after 10 years of usage, Intellipedia helped the IC get caught up to Web 2.0 but never reformed how official reports were created. An official version of Intellipedia, called the Living Intelligence System, was created after the fact and focused on collaboratively writing official reports. It failed to catch on because each agency has a different process for writing official classified reports. Based on the lessons learned from Intellipedia and the Living Intelligence System, a pilot program within the National Geospatial-Intelligence Agency created the Tearline apps focused on writing official collaborative reports in the less bureaucratic space of unclassified content.

== Reception ==
=== Critical response ===
In 2006, some were concerned that individual intelligence agencies would create their own wikis, draining ideas and input from Intellipedia. Sean Dennehy, a CIA official involved in integrating Intellipedia into the intelligence fabric, said disseminating material to the widest possible audience of analysts key to avoiding mistakes.

Some view Intellipedia as risky because it allows more information to be viewed and shared. However, Michael Wertheimer, Mike McConnell's assistant deputy director for analysis, stated that it was worth the risk, stating that although the project was greeted initially with "a lot of resistance" because it ran counter to past practice which sought to limit the pooling of information, there were risks in everything; "the key is risk management, not risk avoidance." Though some encouragement was necessary to spur contributions from the traditional intelligence community Wertheimer said the system appealed to the new generation of intelligence analysts because of its "new way of thinking."

=== Favorable response ===
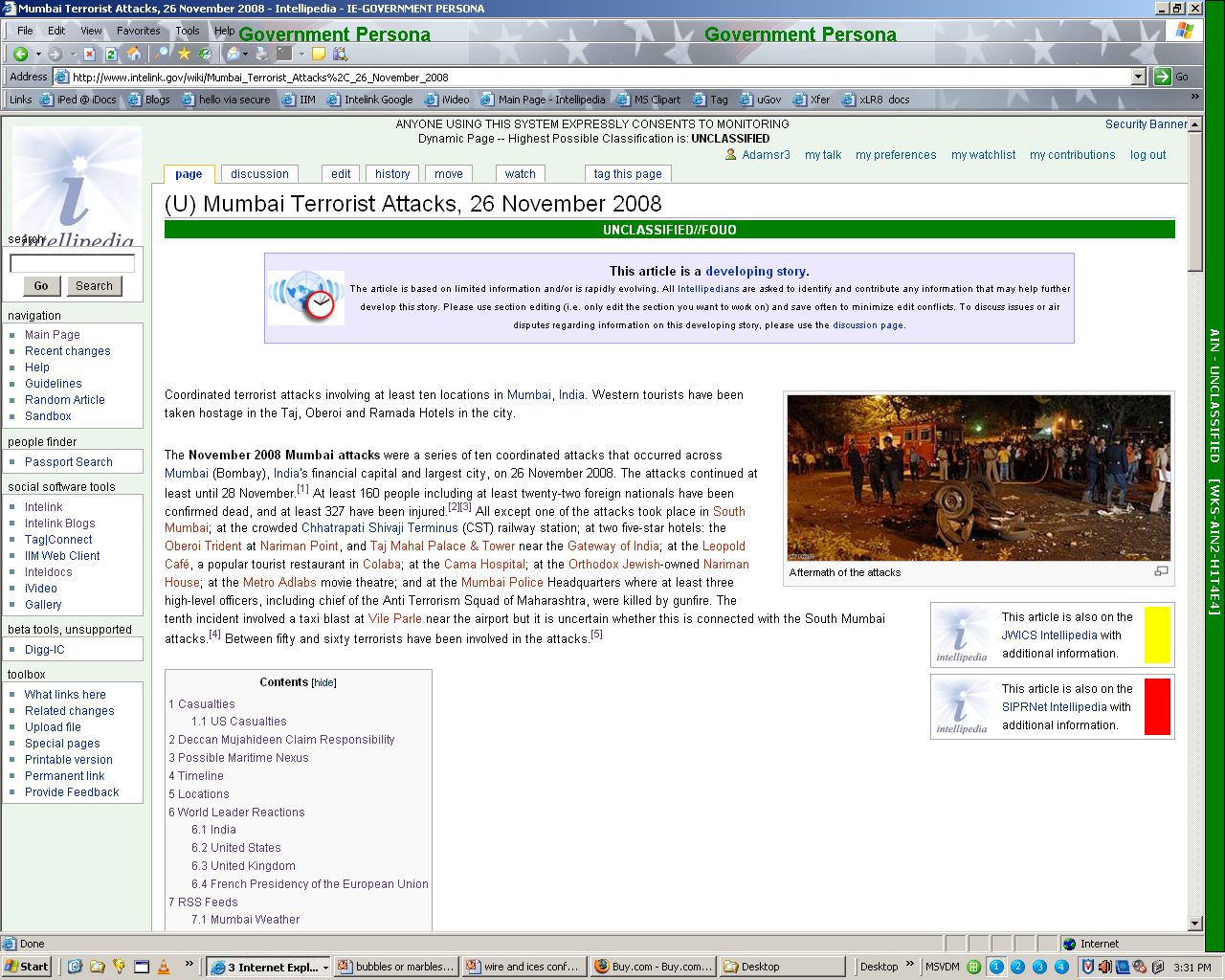
2008 Mumbai attacks page on Intellipedia

Thomas Fingar, Deputy Director of National Intelligence for Analysis, cited the successful use of Intellipedia to develop an article on how Iraqi insurgents were using chlorine in improvised explosive devices.

In a September 10, 2007, testimony before the United States Congress, Michael McConnell, former Director of National Intelligence, cited the increasing use of Intellipedia among analysts and its ability to help experts pool their knowledge, form virtual teams, and make assessments.

Analyzing Intelligence: Origins, Obstacles, and Innovations, a 2008 book by several intelligence analysis experts, cited Intellipedia as evidence of the changing nature of analysis. Eric Haseltine said that "It's hard to overstate what [Burke and Dennehy] did. They made a major transformation overnight with no money after other programs failed to achieve these results with millions of dollars in funding," noting that intelligence analysts "reacted 'more quickly and more intelligently' to potential terrorist threats than they would have without Intellipedia".

== Community practices ==
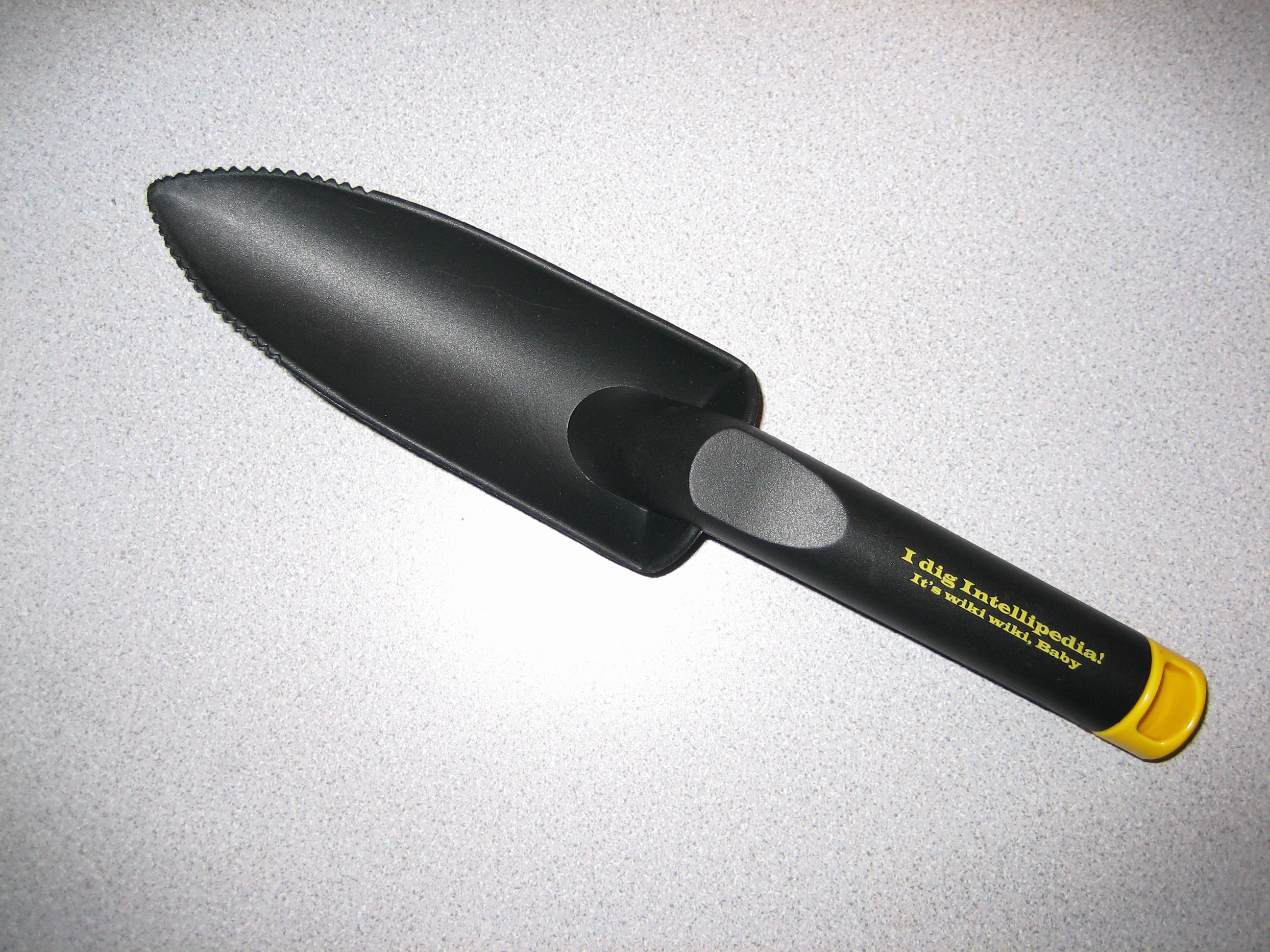
An Intellipedia shovel, awarded to exemplary wiki contributors

The wiki provides so much flexibility that several offices throughout the community using it to maintain and transfer knowledge on daily operations and events. Anyone with access to read it has permission to create and edit articles after acquiring an account with Intelink. Since Intellipedia is intended to be a platform for harmonizing the various points of view of the agencies and analysts of the Intelligence Community, Intellipedia does not enforce a neutral point of view policy. Instead, viewpoints are attributed to the agencies, offices, and individuals participating, with the hope that a consensus view will emerge. Intellipedia also contains non-encyclopedic content including meeting notes and items of internal, administrative interest. Deputy DNI Thomas Fingar made a comparison to eBay, where the reliability of sellers is rated by buyers. He said:

Intellipedia. It's been written up. It's the Wikipedia on a classified network, with one very important difference: it's not anonymous. We want people to establish a reputation. If you're really good, we want people to know you're good. If you're making contributions, we want that known. If you're an idiot, we want that known too.

During 2006 and 2007, inspired by the barnstar used on both Wikipedia and MeatballWiki, Intellipedia editors awarded symbolic shovels to users to distinguish Wiki gardening and to encourage others in the community to contribute. A template with a picture of the limited-edition shovel (actually a trowel) was created to place on user pages for Intellipedians to show their gardening status. The handle bears the imprint: "I dig Intellipedia! It's wiki wiki, Baby." The shovels have since been replaced with a mug bearing the tag line, "Intellipedia: it's what we know".

Different agencies have experimented with other ways of encouraging participation. For example, at the CIA, managers have held contests for best pages with prizes such as free dinners.

Chris Rasmussen, knowledge management officer at the Defense Department's National Geospatial-Intelligence Agency (NGA), argues that "gimmicks" like the Intellipedia shovel, posters, and handbills, encourage people to use Web 2.0 tools like Intellipedia and are effective low-tech solutions to promote their use, also stating that "social software–based contributions should be written in an employee's performance plan".

=== Training ===
Several agencies in the Intelligence community, particularly the CIA and NGA, have developed training programs to provide time to integrate social software tools into analysts' daily work. These classes focus on the use of Intellipedia to capture and manage knowledge, but they also incorporate the use of the other social software tools, including blogs, RSS, and social bookmarking. The courses stress immersion in the tools and instructors encourage participants to work on a specific Intellipedia projects. The courses also expose participants to social media technologies on the Internet.

== Awards ==
In 2009, Don Burke and Sean P. Dennehy, two early Intellipedia users, were awarded the "Homeland Security Service to America Medal" by the Partnership for Public Service for "[Promoting] information sharing across the intelligence community through the development and implementation of Intellipedia."

== See also ==
- A-Space
- Bureaupedia—the FBI's online encyclopedia
- Classified website
- Diplopedia
- DoDTechipedia
- Intellipublia
