= Analyzing Intelligence =

2008 book

Analyzing Intelligence: Origins, Obstacles, and Innovations
- Author: Roger Z. George, James B. Bruce, et al.
- Language: English
- Genre: Intelligence
- Publisher: Georgetown University Press (USA)
- Publication date: 2008
- Publication place: United States
- Media type: Paperback
- Pages: 340
- ISBN: 978-1-58901-201-1
- OCLC: 163593735

Analyzing Intelligence: Origins, Obstacles, and Innovations is a 2008 book by editors Roger Z. George, James B. Bruce and multiple contributors who are experts in the field of Intelligence Analysis. The book, which is listed on the Central Intelligence Agency's suggested reading list, provides the first full assessment on the state of United States intelligence analysis since 9/11, and offers proposals for improved analytical methods, training, and structured approaches, according to Georgetown University Press. The authors argue intelligence analysis should become its own "professional discipline", and should incorporate rigorous analytic methodologies, increase training and education throughout the intelligence enterprise, and embrace collaborative tools like Intellipedia, a wiki used by the United States government.
