= Michael Wertheimer =

- Born: Michael; February 6, 1957 (age 69)
- Occupation: Government Executive
- Known for: Founding A-Space; Intelligence reform
- Successor: John Miller
- Awards: CryptoMathematics Institute President’s Award, Sir Peter Marychurch Award (NSA/GCHQ cryptology award), the NSA Adjunct Faculty of the Year Award, and the Secretary of Defense Exceptional Civilian Service Award

Michael Wertheimer (born February 6, 1957) is a cryptologic mathematician. From October 31, 2005, until June 2009, he was the assistant deputy director and chief technology officer of the Office of the Director of National Intelligence for Analysis. Wertheimer oversaw the coordination of Intelligence Community efforts to bring increased depth and accuracy to analysis through technology. In 2008, Wertheimer successfully launched A-Space, the U.S. Intelligence Community's "Facebook for Spies." This new social network opened in September 2008 for U.S. intelligence analysts and covert operatives across some 16 intelligence agencies to share information. He continues to advocate for reforms in the intelligence community and is currently involved in pressing for adopting Intellipedia, a classified wiki.

Before this appointment, Wertheimer spent two years in industry building a research group focused on the intelligence community. From 1982 to 2003, he was a cryptologic mathematician at the National Security Agency. In 1999 he was selected as technical director for the Data Acquisition Office in the NSA's Signals Intelligence Directorate. He co-authored the 2001 Signals Intelligence Strategy and the 2002 SIGINT architecture model.

Wertheimer returned to the National Security Agency in June 2009 and, in June 2010, became its current director for research.

In 2014 he retired from the NSA and now works at the University of Maryland.

== Education ==
Wertheimer received B.A. degrees in mathematics and philosophy from the University of Rochester. He also received M.A. and Ph.D. degrees in mathematics from the University of Pennsylvania.

== Personal life ==
Wertheimer married Christina Grot on May 16, 1993. They have two children Daniel, born on May 13, 1996, and Marissa, born on November 17, 1993.

== See also ==
- A-Space
- Intellipedia
