= 3rd Combat Communications Group =

- Active: 1957–1962; 1964–2013
- Country: United States
- Branch: United States Air Force
- Role: Tactical communications
- Size: Group
- Nickname: "Third Herd"
- Mottos: World Wise Communications; Anytime, Anywhere; Live by the Sword
- Mascot: Buford the Bull
- Decorations: Air Force Meritorious Unit Award Air Force Outstanding Unit Award Armed Forces Expeditionary Medal

Insignia
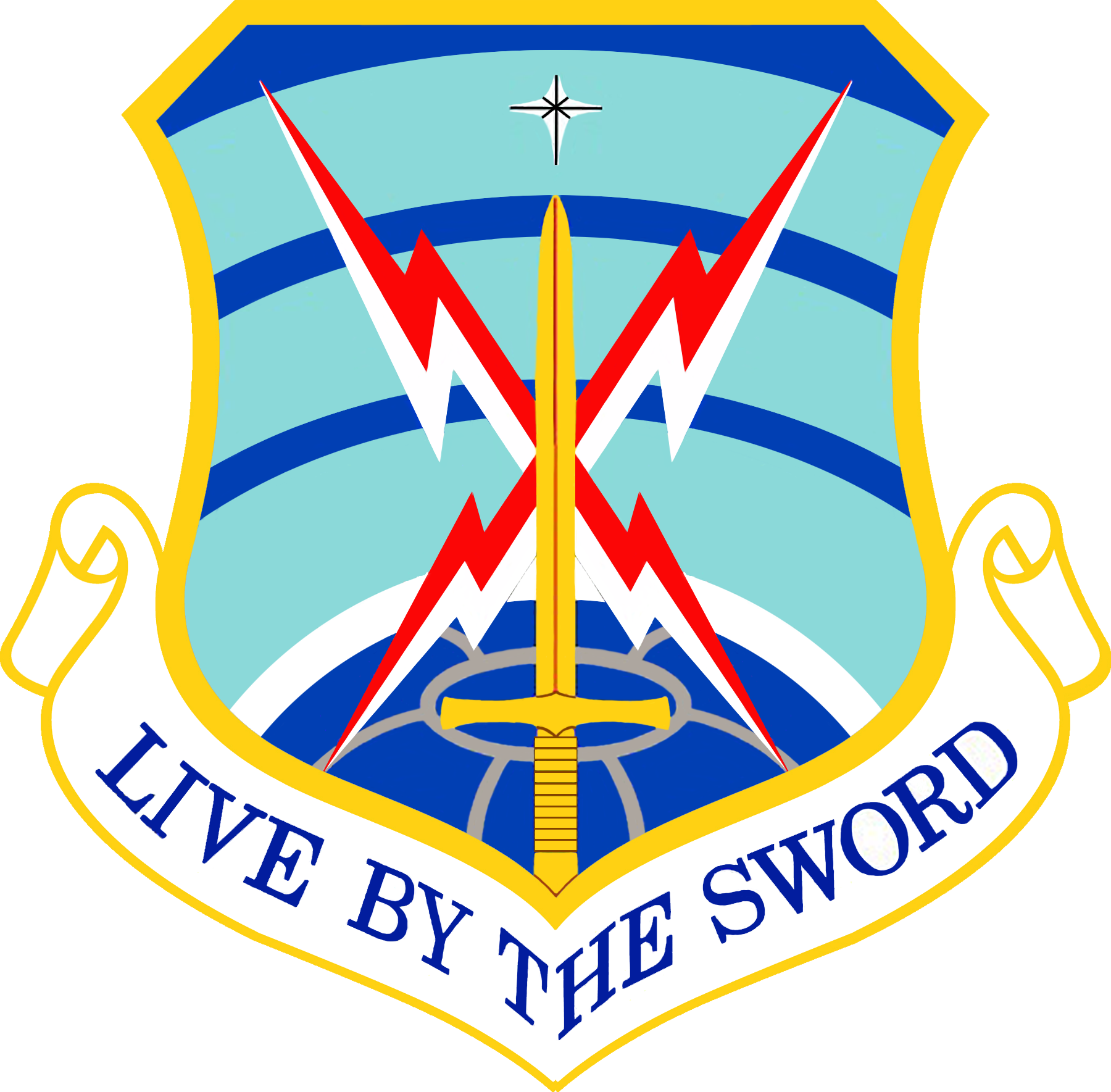
- 3rd Combat Communications Group emblem (Note: Approved 10 June 1985. Symbolism: Blue and yellow are the Air Force colors. Blue alludes to the sky, the theater of Air force operations. Yellow refers to the sun and the excellence required of Air Force personnel. The sword symbolizes the group's combat mission. The electronic flashes represent the telecommunications and data automation function. The use of navigational aids is indicated by Polaris, the North Star. The satellite communications function is denoted by the satellite. The space shuttle symbolizes the group's ongoing support of such interim missions such as the Space Transportation System.)

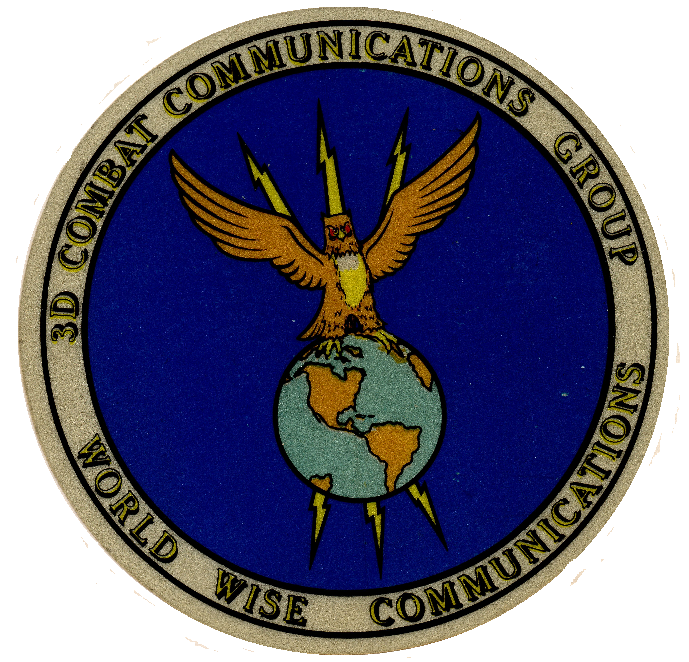
- Unofficial 3 Combat Communications Group emblem (Note: This emblem was not officially authorized. it was first used by the 3rd Mobile Communications Squadron. When the 3rd Mobile Communications Group replaced the squadron it adopted the emblem and motto. The version shown dates from after the group's redesignation.)

The United States Air Force's 3rd Combat Communications Group (Note: Properly, 3d Combat Communications Group.) was a United States Air Force combat communications unit located at Tinker Air Force Base, Oklahoma.

== History ==
=== Command communications support in Europe ===
In early 1951, the growing size and complexity of the American military presence in England required a larger command and organizational structure to meet the needs of the increased operations (both strategic and tactical.) Third Air Force was activated on 1 May 1951 to oversee tactical air operations from the United Kingdom and provide and support Strategic Air Command's 7th Air Division. Its 3rd Communications Group was activated at South Ruislip Air Station on 8 July 1957. The 3rd was initially assigned the 603rd Communications Squadron at South Ruislip and the 605th Communications Squadron at RAF Sculthorpe. In September 1959, the group added the 7518th Communications Squadron at RAF Alconbury and the 7519th Communications Squadron at RAF Bentwaters.

In 1962, United States Air Forces Europe transferred its communications support mission to Air Force Communications Service (AFCS). To implement this, on 1 July 1962 the 3rd and its subordinate were transferred to AFCS, which immediately inactivated them. Base communications at South Ruislip, Sculthorpe, and Alconbury were transferred to AFCS's 1969th, 2145th, and 2166th Communications Squadrons respectively, while AFCS formed the 2164th Communications Squadron at Bentwaters. Management functions of the group were absorbed by the United Kingdom Communications Region.

=== Tactical communications at Tinker Air Force Base ===
On 1 December 1952, Airways and Air Communications Service (AACS) established the 3rd AACS Squadron, Mobile at Tinker Air Force Base, Oklahoma as the unit to which were assigned all its assets that could be moved to respond to emergencies and contingencies in the continental United States. (Note: AACS simultaneously activated the 1st AACS Squadron, Mobile in the Pacific and the 2nd AACS Squadron, Mobile in Europe.) When AACS became Air Force Communications Service (AFCS) on 1 July 1961, the squadron became the 3rd Mobile Communications Squadron.

Due to the expanding size of its mobile communications units, on 1 July 1964, the 3rd Mobile Communications Group organized at Tinker Air Force Base, Oklahoma, and assigned to the Air Force Communications Service (later, Air Force Communications Command (AFCC)) Upon its early reactivation in the continental United States, it incorporated the 1869th Facility Checking Squadron (1 October 1966 – 1 September 1971). Since 1964, it has been assigned to various organizations of the Air Force Communications Service/Command, on 1 October 1990 it became part of the Tactical Air Command, and then Air Combat Command.

On 5 October 2009, the 3rd was realigned underneath the newly activated 689th Combat Communications Wing, headquartered at Robins Air Force Base, Georgia. With this realignment, the group now fell under the Twenty-Fourth Air Force and Air Force Space Command.

The 3rd inactivated 30 September 2013, affecting more than 600 military billets, as the Air Force downsized its deployable communications assets to match its reduction in combat forces. In addition, updated communications technology requires fewer personnel to erect and operate deployable communications systems. Simultaneously, the 689th Combat Communications Wing inactivated.

Media reports state that the group was inactivated by order of the 2013 National Defense Authorization Act. However, no part of the act addresses the inactivation of the unit and no Air Force communications or tactical comm-electronics budget requests were denied by Congress.

== Lineage ==
- Constituted as the 3rd Communications Group on 16 May 1957

Activated on 8 July 1957
Inactivated on 1 July 1962

- Redesignated 3rd Mobile Communications Group on 20 May 1964 and activated (not organized)

Organized on 1 July 1964
Redesignated 3rd Combat Communications Group on 23 March 1976
Redesignated 3rd Combat Information Systems Group on 15 August 1984
Redesignated 3rd Combat Communications Group on 1 October 1986
Inactivated on 30 September 2013

=== Assignments ===
- Third Air Force, 8 July 1957
- United Kingdom Communications Region, 1 July 1962
- Air Force Communications Service, 20 May 1964 (Note: Not organized until 1 July 1964. Miller, p. 259.)
- Tactical Communications Area (later Tactical Communications Division, Tactical Information Systems Division, Tactical Communications Division), 1 June 1979
- 602nd Tactical Air Control Wing (later 602nd Air Control Wing, 1 October 1990
- 552nd Airborne Warning and Control Wing, 1 May 1992
- Twelfth Air Force, 1 April 1994
- Twenty-Fourth Air Force, 1 August 2009
- 689th Combat Communications Wing, 5 October 2009 – 30 September 2013

=== Components ===
- 3rd Combat Communications Support Squadron, 29 May 1992 – 30 September 2013
- 31st Combat Communications Squadron, 22 July 1988 – 30 September 2013
- 32nd Combat Communications Squadron, 22 July 1988 – 30 September 2013
- 33rd Combat Communications Squadron, 22 July 1988 – 30 September 2013
- 34th Combat Communications Squadron, 29 May 1992 – 30 September 2013
- 603rd Communications Squadron, Operations, 8 July 1957 – 1 July 1962
- 605th Communications Squadron, 8 July 1957 – 1 July 1962
- 7518th Communications Squadron, 1 September 1959 – 1 July 1962
- 7519th Communications Squadron, 1 September 1959 – 1 July 1962

=== Stations ===
- South Ruislip Air Station, England, 8 July 1957 – 1 July 1962
- Tinker Air Force Base, Oklahoma, 1 July 1964 – 30 September 2013

=== Commanders ===
- Maj James M Dunn, May 1957
- Lt Col Gilbert H Bertie, Jun 1961
- Lt Col Stanley J Washuk, 14 Jun 1962 – 1 July 1962
- Lt Col John R Coonan, 1 July 1964 (Note: Miller gives 20 May 1964 as the start date for his command, but the group was not organized until 1 July. Miller, pp. 459-60.)
- Col William T Judkins, 6 July 1964
- Col John T Ford, 22 December 1965
- Col Ralph E McDaniel, 5 August 1968
- Col Francis W Fender, 1 September 1969
- Col Robert W Pool, March 1971
- Col John D Nolan, 30 Apr 1973
- Col Lowell F Bohn, 15 December 1973
- Col Paul W Edwards, 17 June 1976
- Col Ronald H McKinney, 15 July 1978 (Note: Miller contains a typographical error, showing that Edwards remained in command until 1978, but dates the start of McKinney's command in 1976. Miller, p. 460.)
- Col James Selph, 15 September 1980
- Col Gerald L Boynton, 15 December 1982
- Col Phillip J Lurie, 1 May 1984
- Col Buford R Witt, 24 Jan 1986
- Col Carl E Stoops, 22 Jul 1988
- Col Robert A Allen Jr, 19 August 1990
- Col Dale W Meyerrose, July 1992
- Col J D Wells, June 1994
- Col Stephen R Quick, May 1995
- Col David J Kovach, July 1997
- Col Daniel R Dinkins, May 1999
- Col Gregory L Brundidge, July 2001
- Col Carl Williamson, May 2003
- Col Tracy A Amos, April 2005
- Col James H Appleyard Jr, March 2006
- Col Thomas A Byrge Jr, April 2008
- Col David S Babyak, June 2010
- Col Matthew C Harris, June 2012 – 30 September 2013

== Decorations ==
- Air Force Outstanding Unit Award
  - 1 July 1960 – 1 February 1962
  - 1 January 1965 – 31 December 1966
  - 1 May 1970 – 31 December 1971
  - 1 January 1972 – 31 December 1972
  - 1 January 1974 – 31 December 1974
  - 1 January 1975 – 31 December 1975
  - 1 January 1978 – 31 December 1978
  - 12 November 1984 – 3 June 1985
  - 1 January 1986 – 31 December 1987
  - 1 May 1990 – 30 April 1992
  - 1 April 1992 – 31 March 1994
  - 1 April 1994 – 31 December 1994
  - 1 January 1995 – 31 May 1996
  - 1 June 1996 – 31 May 1997
  - 1 June 1997 – 31 May 1999
  - 1 June 1999 – 31 May 2001
  - 1 June 2001 – 31 May 2002
  - 1 June 2007 – 31 May 2008
- Armed Forces Expeditionary Streamer for Grenada
- Air Force Meritorious Unit Award
  - 1 June 2003 – 31 May 2005 (USCENTAF G-0372)
  - 1 June 2008 – 31 May 2009
- Maj. Gen. Harold M. McClelland Award (2005)
