= Bureaupedia =

Wiki used privately by FBI

Bureaupedia is a wiki used internally at the FBI with the intention of capturing the knowledge of senior agents and reduce knowledge loss due to retirement. Its existence was revealed in a September 2008 article in Federal Computer Week.

FBI officials see Bureaupedia as a knowledge management tool that will let agents and analysts share their experiences to ensure that their accumulated insight remains after they retire. The project is a collaborative effort between the FBI's chief knowledge officer and chief technology officer.

== Critiques ==
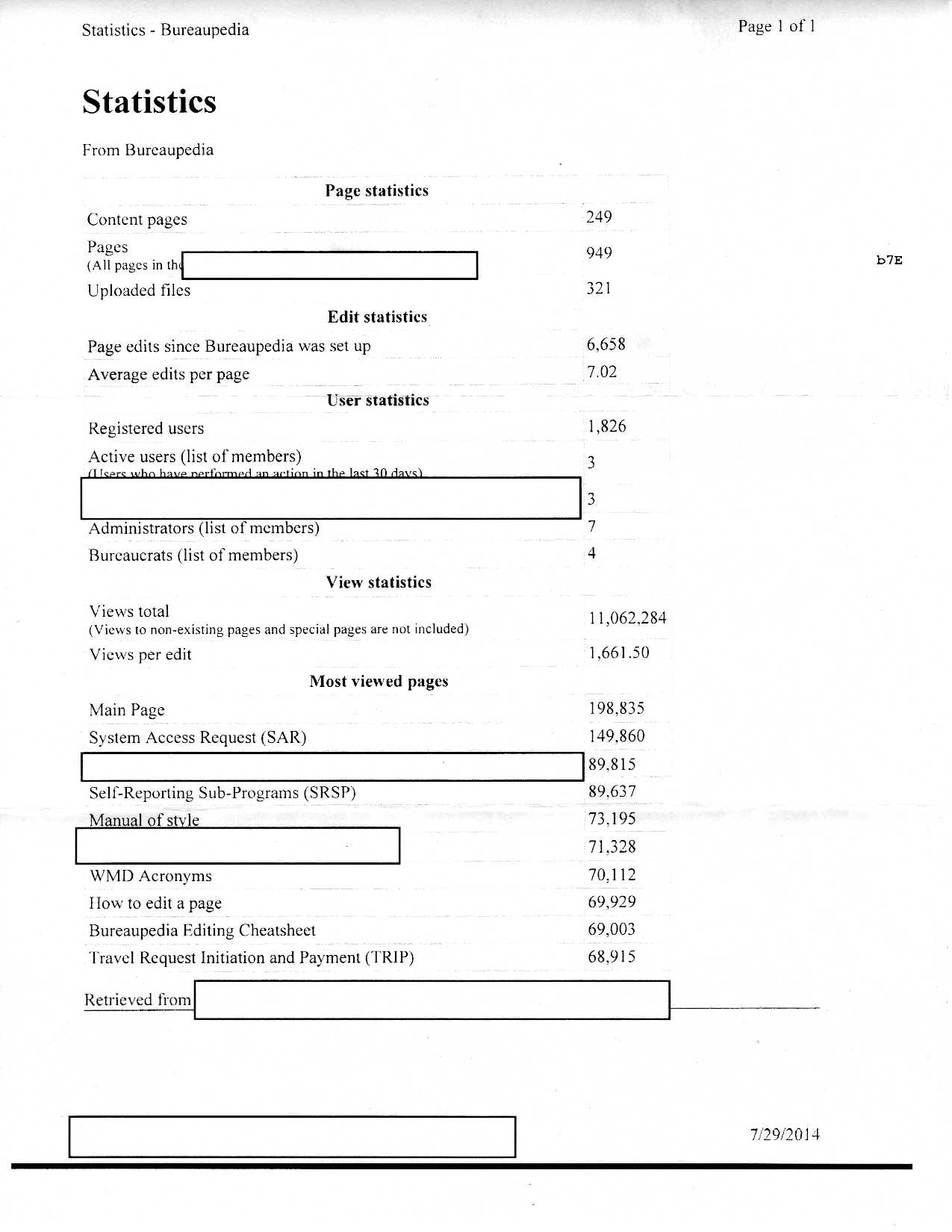
Bureaupedia Special:Statistics

An earlier wiki, Intellipedia, had been established for similar purposes across the U.S. government's 16 intelligence agencies including the FBI, and it has been suggested that FBI staff should use that one instead of the new smaller-scope Bureaupedia.

Wikipedia co-founder Jimmy Wales noted in testimony to Congress differences between vertical and horizontal information sharing and suggested that both could be successful e-government endeavors.

== See also ==
- Intellipedia – US Intelligence Community encyclopedia
- Diplopedia – Online wiki encyclopedia of the United States Department of State
- DoDTechipedia
