= 689th Combat Communications Wing =

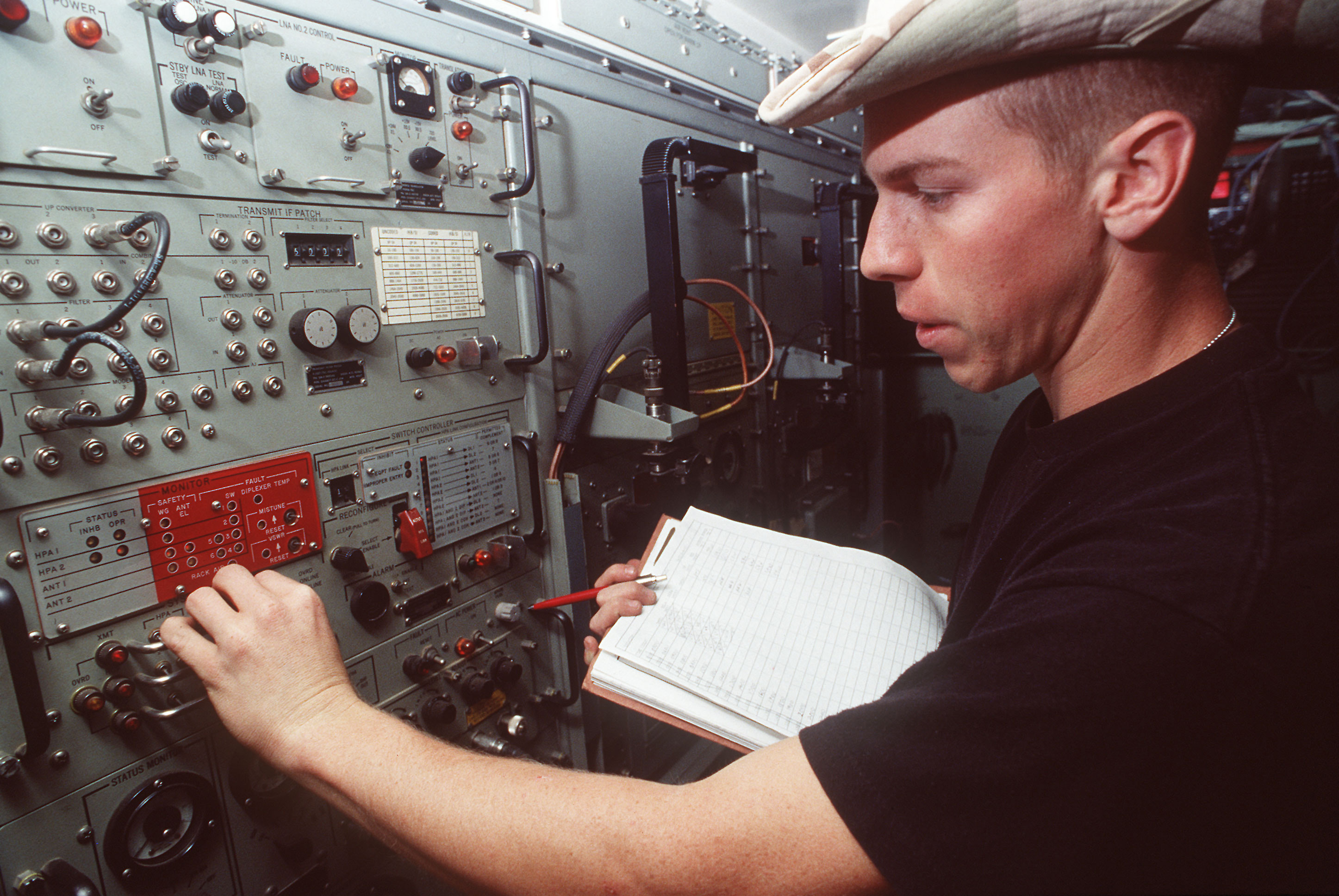
- A satellite communications specialist of the 5th Combat Communications Group checking a mobile satellite communications system.
- Active: 1948–1991; 2009–2013
- Country: United States
- Branch: United States Air Force
- Role: Combat communications
- Decorations: Air Force Outstanding Unit Award

Insignia
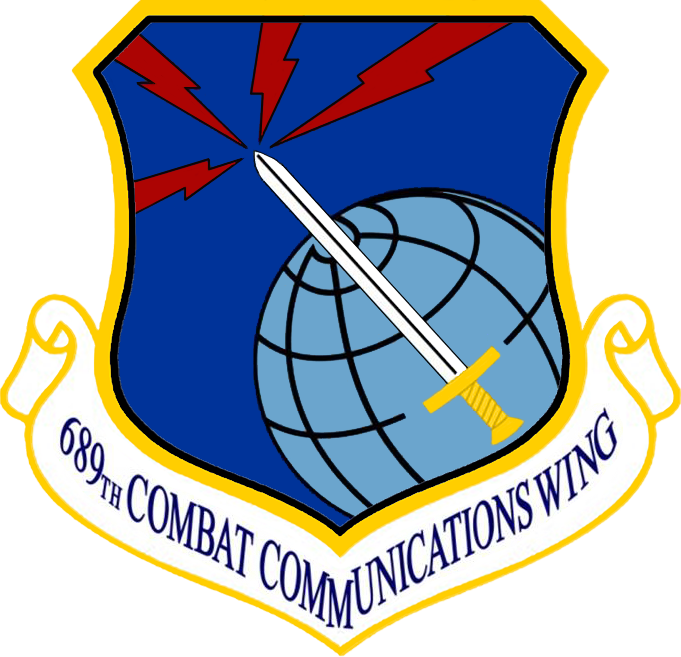
- 689th Combat Communications Wing emblem (Note: Approved 5 April 2010.)

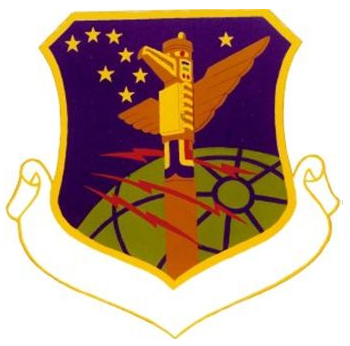
- 1931st Information Systems Wing emblem (Note: Approved 4 April 1985.)

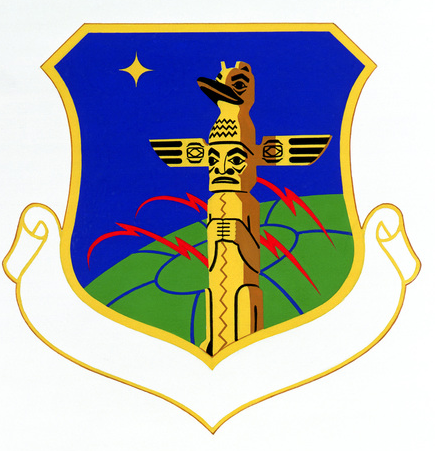
- 1931st Communications Group emblem

The 689th Combat Communications Wing was a wing of the United States Air Force stationed at Robins Air Force Base, Georgia. The wing was activated on 9 October 2009 as a subordinate unit of Twenty-Fourth Air Force. On 5 June 2013, the wing was inactivated, along with the 3d Combat Communications Group at Tinker Air Force Base, Oklahoma. The 5th Combat Communications Group at Robins now reports to the 688th Cyberspace Wing.

== History ==
The 689th's mission was to train, deploy, and deliver expeditionary and specialized communications, air traffic control, and landing systems, and to take cyber capabilities to the tactical edge for relief and combat operations.

Its units included the 3d Combat Communications Group, at Tinker Air Force Base, Oklahoma, and the 5th Combat Communications Group at Robins Air Force Base, Georgia.

== Lineage ==
- Designated as the 1931st Airways and Air Communications Service Squadron on 11 October 1948

Organized on 18 October 1948
Redesignated 1931st Communications Squadron on 1 July 1961
Redesignated 1931st Communications Group on 1 March 1969
Redesignated 1931st Information Systems Wing on 1 July 1984
Redesignated 1931st Communications Wing on 1 November 1986
Redesignated 1931st Communications Group on 1 October 1990
Inactivated on 26 September 1991

- Redesignated 689th Combat Communications Wing on 22 September 2009

Activated on 5 October 2009
Inactivated on 30 September 2013

=== Assignments ===
- 1804th Airways and Air Communications Service Group (later 1804th Airways and Air Communications Service Wing, Alaskan Airways and Air Communications Service Region, Alaskan Communications Region): 18 October 1948
- Air Force Communications Service (later Air Force Communications Command), 1 June 1972
- Continental Communications Division: 1 June 1981
- Air Force Communications Command: 1 May 1985
- 21st Tactical Fighter Wing: 1 October 1990 – 26 September 1991
- Twenty-Fourth Air Force (Air Forces Strategic): 5 October 2009 – 30 September 2013

=== Components ===
- 3d Combat Communications Group, 5 October 2009 – 30 September 2013
- 5th Combat Communications Group, 5 October 2009 – 30 September 2013
- 1825th Electronics Installation Squadron, 1 June 1972 – 30 June 1974
- 1930th Information Systems Squadron (later 1930th Communications Squadron), 1 July 1985 – 1 October 1990
- 1935th Communications Squadron, 1 June 1972 – 1 July 1972
- 1995th Communications Squadron (later 1995th Information Systems Squadron, 1995th Communications Squadron), 1 June 1972 – 1 October 1990
- 2064th Communications Squadron (later 2064th Information Systems Squadron, 2064th Communications Squadron), 1 June 1972 – 1 October 1990

=== Stations ===
- Elmendorf Air Force Base, Alaska, 18 October 1948 – 26 September 1991
- Robins Air Force Base, Georgia, 5 October 2009 – 30 September 2013

=== Awards ===
Award streamer	Award	Dates	Notes
	Air Force Outstanding Unit Award	1 July 1959 – 30 June 1961	1931st Airways and Air Communications Service Squadron
	Air Force Outstanding Unit Award	27–30 March 1964	1931st Communications Squadron
	Air Force Outstanding Unit Award	8 July 1966 – 1 May 1967	1931st Communications Squadron
	Air Force Outstanding Unit Award	2 May 1967 – 1 January 1968	1931st Communications Squadron
	Air Force Outstanding Unit Award	14–21 August 1967	1931st Communications Squadron
	Air Force Outstanding Unit Award	1 January 1968 – 31 December 1968	1931st Communications Squadron
	Air Force Outstanding Unit Award	10 February 1979 – 10 February 1981	1931st Communications Group
	Air Force Outstanding Unit Award	1 January 1984 – 1 January 1985	1931st Communications Group (later 1931st Information Systems Wing)
