= 31st Combat Communications Squadron =

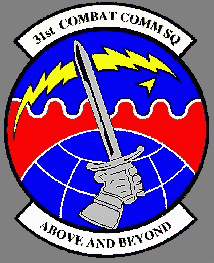
- 31st Combat Communications Squadron emblem
- Active: 19??-2013
- Country: United States
- Branch: United States Air Force
- Role: Tactical communications
- Size: Squadron
- Part of: Air Force Space Command/ 3d Combat Communications Group
- Garrison/HQ: Tinker AFB, Oklahoma
- Motto(s): "Red Bulls, Above and Beyond"
- Colors: Red

The 31st Combat Communications Squadron (31 CBCS) was a United States Air Force combat communications squadron, located at Tinker AFB.

== History ==
Lineage. Constituted as 31 Communications Squadron, Command and activated on 7 Dec 1959. Organized on 1 Feb 1960. Inactivated on 1 Oct 1970. Disbanded on 15 Jun 1983. Reconstituted and redesignated as 31 Combat Communications Squadron on 15 Jul 1988. Activated on 22 Jul 1988. Assignments. Strategic Air Command, 7 Dec 1959; 1 Communications (later 1 Aerospace Communications) Group, Command, 1 Feb 1960 – 1 Oct 1970. 3 Combat Communications Group, 22 Jul 1988-. Stations. Offutt AFB, NE, 1 Feb 1960 – 1 Oct 1970. Tinker AFB, OK, 22 Jul 1988-.

== Assignments ==
=== Major Command ===
- Air Force Space Command (???- ???)

=== Wing/Group ===
- 3d Combat Communications Group (???-Present)

== Previous designations ==
- 31st Combat Communications Squadron (???-Present)

== Bases stationed ==
- Tinker AFB, Oklahoma (???-Present)

== Commanders ==
Lt. Col. William Uhrig (2009-2012) Lt. Co. Jeffery Katzman (2012-2013) Capt. Christopher Abbot (2013-Closure)

== Decorations ==
- Air Force Outstanding Unit Award
