= DoDTechipedia =

Wiki of the United States Department of Defense

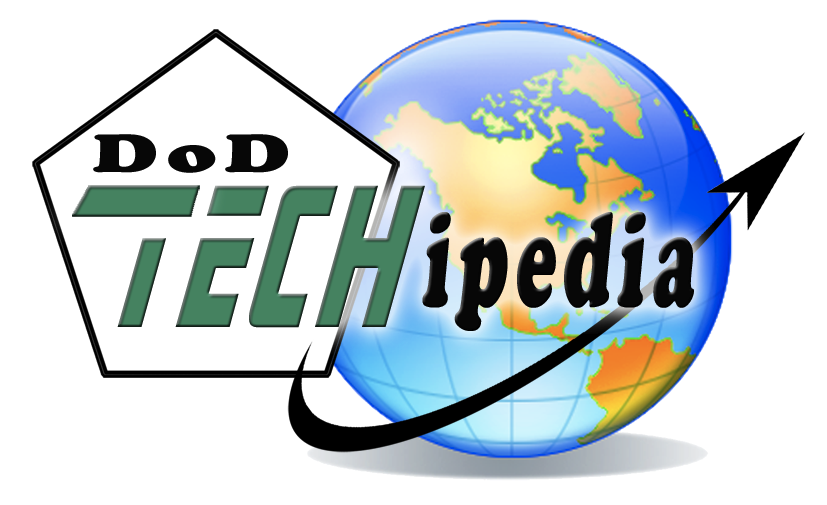
Logo

DoDTechipedia is a wiki developed by the United States Department of Defense (DoD), to facilitate increased communication and collaboration among DoD scientists, engineers, program managers, acquisition professionals and operational warfighters. DoDTechipedia is a living knowledge base that reduces duplication of effort, encourages collaboration among program areas and connects capability providers with technology developers. DoDTechipedia runs on Confluence wiki engine, unlike a number of MediaWiki-based government wikis like Diplopedia and Bureaupedia.

== History ==
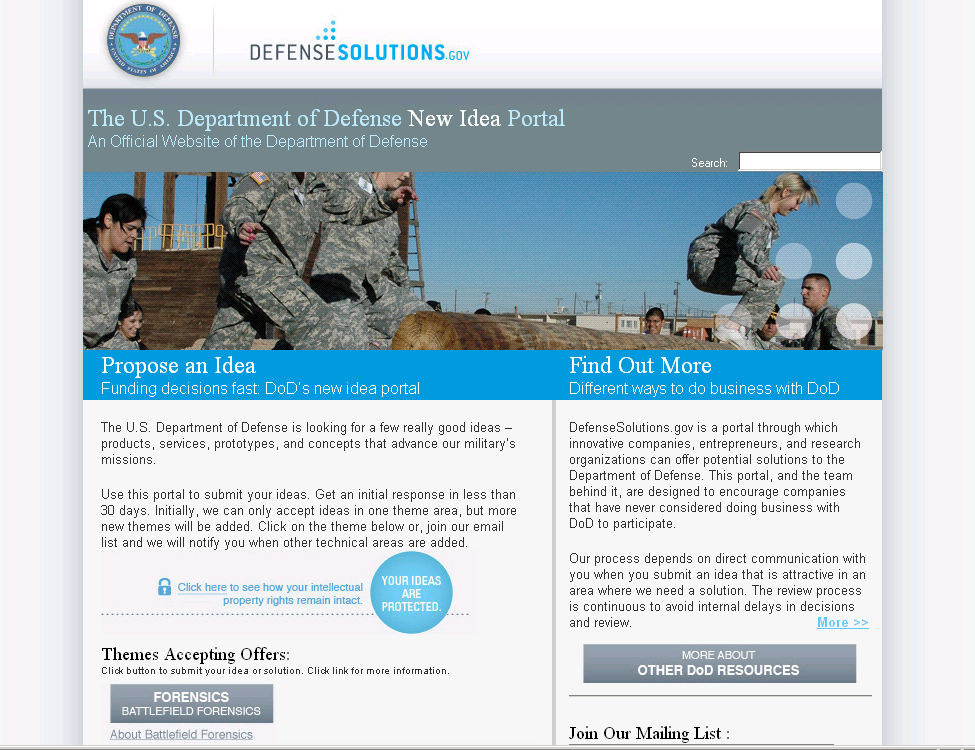
DefenseSolutions Portal (DoDTechipedia External) 2009

Launched on October 1, 2008, DoDTechipedia was developed to increase communication and collaboration among DoD scientists, engineers, and acquisition professionals, as well as operational warfighters, and ultimately academic and private sector partners. The goal is to break through existing stovepiped communication and coordination processes and allow researchers to collaborate directly with other researchers in related areas and with technology users across the DoD. Using Web 2.0 technologies, specifically wiki and blogging tools, DoDTechipedia enables users to see and discuss the innovative technologies being developed throughout the DoD and also emerging technologies from the academic and private sectors. Greater collaboration will result in more rapid technology development and the discovery of innovative solutions to meet critical capability needs.

Several DoD organizations are working together to develop, maintain and govern DoDTechipedia, including: Under Secretary of Defense for Acquisition, Technology and Logistics (AT&L), Director of Defense Research and Engineering (DDR&E), Networks and Information Integration and Department of Defense Chief Information Officer (NII/DoD CIO), and Defense Technical Information Center (DTIC).

== Community practices ==
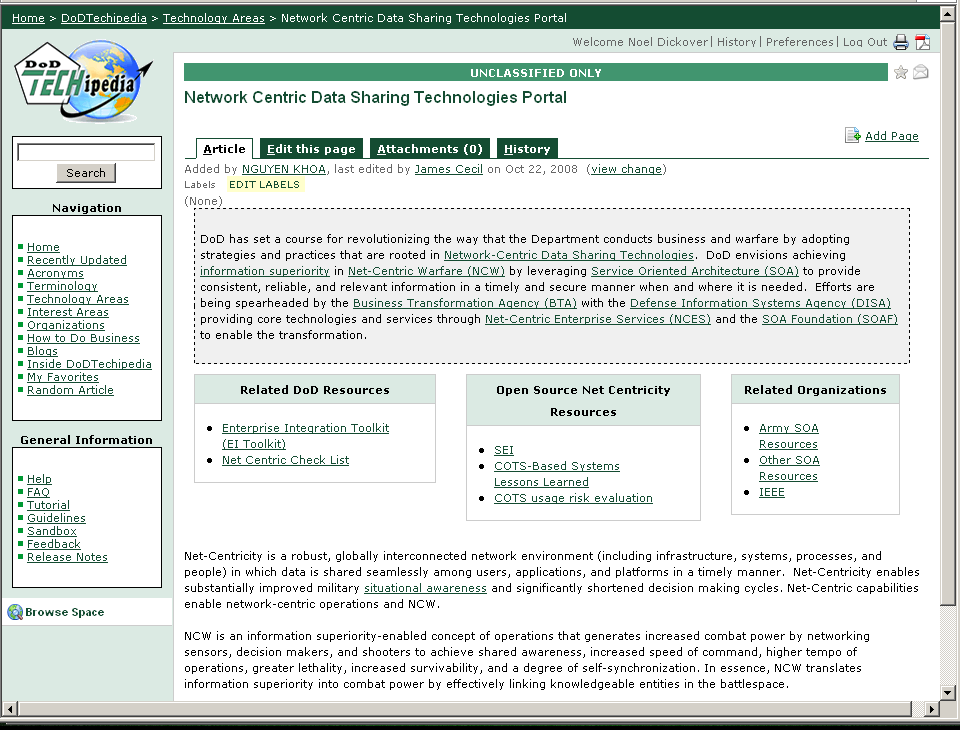
Sample screenshot of the DoDTechipedia interface (2009)

The limited-access DoDTechipedia is a repository of user-created interactive articles. Wiki users can interact with an article by editing content, adding attachments, creating sub-pages, posting discussion boxes, and viewing the change history. Discussions can be started on the page itself by adding discussion boxes at the end of the article. Within the discussion boxes on the page, all users may respond to one another's thoughts and post feedback.

Department of Defense military, civilian employees, and contractors with Common Access Cards (CAC) can access a quick registration then log into DoDTechipedia using their CAC's. Other US Federal Government employees and Contractors can access DoDTechipedia after registering.

To promote a collaborative culture, DoDTechipedia also supports blogging, with threads categorized under each of the original Technology Areas. Blogs are intended to be the center for informal information sharing between users. Not only can users share thoughts, but they can also meet others with similar interests developing networks within the community. DoDTechipedia blogs are controlled by blog owners who provide regular postings. While any user can comment on a blog entry, only the blog owner can post an entry. DoDTechipedia is always looking for additional blog owners.

== See also ==
- Defense Technical Information Center
- Intellipedia
- Diplopedia
- Bureaupedia
- milSuite
