= Gus Hunt =

Gus Hunt is an American cybersecurity expert, and former intelligence officer. He is the managing director and cyber strategy lead for Accenture Federal Services. He formerly served as the Chief Technology Officer for the Chief Information Officer at the Central Intelligence Agency (CIA).

== Early life ==
Gustavo Moses Hunt was born in Pinola, MS to parents Merrill & June Hunt. He is an only child. He briefly attended Columbia High School in Columbia, MS where he excelled in science, math and French. Gus Hunt is a graduate of Tulsa Welding School and received a ME in Civil/Structural Engineering from Vanderbilt University in Nashville, Tennessee.

== Career ==
Hunt started his career as an aerospace engineer in the private sector for seven years.

Hunt joined the CIA in 1991. He served as director of Architecture and Systems Engineering (ASE), chair of the CIA Architecture Review Board and the Architecture and Systems Engineers Occupational Panel, and chief of the CIO's Advanced Technology Group within the Directorate of Intelligence (DI). He also served as chief of research and development for the Director of Central Intelligence's (DCI) Crime and Narcotics Center and deputy chief of the Operations Support Group in the DCI's Non-Proliferation Center. He later served as director of applications services for CIA. He later served as chief technology officer for the chief information officer at the CIA.

Hunt also briefly appeared as "The Banker", the shadowy figure on the game show Deal or No Deal who offers contestants "deals" in exchange for their briefcase. Following the cancelation of the series, Hunt consulted on various international versions of the series.

Hunt is now the managing director and cyber strategy lead for Accenture Federal Services.
