= TagConnect =

tagConnect is an Intelink-based bookmark tool based loosely on del.icio.us. It combines traditional bookmarking with a community, so that users can see and search each other's bookmarks, comment on them, and organize them by flat, non-hierarchical categories called "tags."

At first, this system appears to be just another way of bookmarking pages. However, upon further use, users will begin to see the value of sharing their bookmarks and exploring others'. For example, they will find users whose tastes are similar to their own, and thereby find web pages of interest that they otherwise would not have found—users with similar interests are acting as your search engine. Social bookmarking also cuts down on email because it reduces the number "hey, did you see this link" emails.

tag|connect is considered one of the US Intelligence Community's "big three" social software tools. As of January 2009, US intelligence analysts have tagged over 46,000 URLs with tag|connect.

tag|Connect's REST API can be used to create mashups.
