= Intellipublia =

MediaWiki variant for official approval

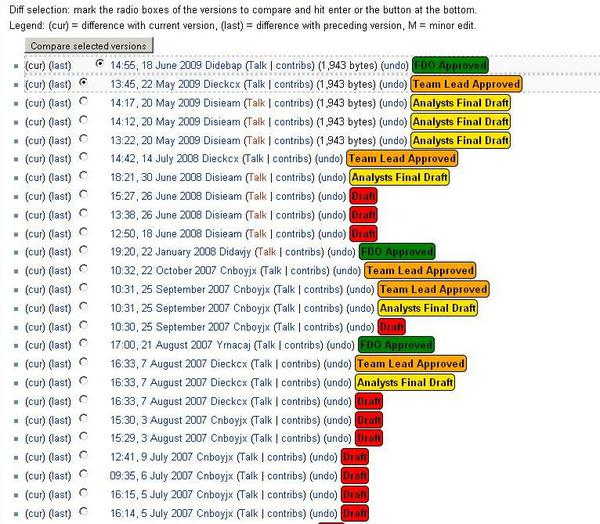
Screenshot of the Intellipublia pilot's contributor-driven review process

Intellipublia is a pilot effort to implement production process reform within the United States Intelligence Community. Based on the MediaWiki engine, Intellipublia introduces a review capability to the existing collaborative environment, similar to that of Intellipedia.

A sub-system of Intellipublia is the Joint Product Line.

Intellipublia's Joint Product Line (JPL) combines official agency review with emergent content for joint or "purple" output. Users can consume and compare "authorized" versions to the emergent "living" version. Agency logos quickly denote that official vetters have reviewed the content. In addition to agency logos, the "authority" and roles of vetters are denoted by color-coded stamps such as "team leader" and "final authority." Once the official vetters sign off on the content, their agency logo will become un-ghosted at the top. Ghosted logos show that someone from that agency has made edits but doesn't have a higher vetting function. This is modified MediaWiki software and shown in the edit history mode.
