= 32nd Combat Communications Squadron =

32d Combat Communications Squadron
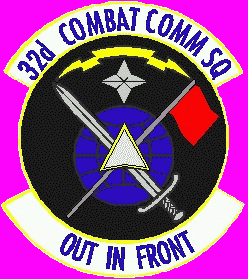
- 32d Combat Communications Squadron emblem
- Active: 22 July 1988 – 2013
- Country: United States
- Branch: United States Air Force
- Role: Tactical Communications
- Size: Squadron
- Part of: Air Force Space Command/24th Air Force/3d Combat Communications Group
- Garrison/HQ: Tinker AFB, Oklahoma
- Motto: OUT IN FRONT!!!!

Commanders
- Current commander: Lt Col James Simonds

The 32d Combat Communications Squadron (32 CCS) was a United States Air Force combat communications squadron, located at Tinker AFB. They deploy quality communications-computer systems and air traffic services for military operations and emergency missions under hostile and base conditions anytime, anywhere.

== Mission ==
Provide engineering team and expeditionary communications to support ADVON, initial reception of forces, and "reach forward" deployment of key personnel. Provide communications infrastructure to activate and robust two air expeditionary wings (AEW) with a maximum boots on ground of 3,000 persons each. Provide deployed base information infrastructure across the full spectrum of operations. Provide connectivity for base infrastructure and from base infrastructure to theatre information infrastructure. Provide power and environmental control where these services are not available from host or wing civil engineering. Provide theatre-level services including global broadcast system tactical receive suite, line of sight and intra-theatre information infrastructure. Provide air traffic control services to one AEW.

== History ==
The 32nd Combat Communications Squadron was activated on 22 July 1988 under special order G-60 from Air Force Communications Command (AFCC). The 32nd Combat Communications Squadron has previously reported to the 552nd Air Control Wing stationed in Tinker Air Force Base, Oklahoma, the 602nd Air Control Wing stationed in Davis-Monthan Air Force Base in Tucson, Arizona, and the Tactical Communications Division headquartered at Langley Air Force Base, Virginia.

== Assignments ==
=== Major Command ===
- Air Combat Command (???- ???)

=== Wing/Group ===
- 3d Combat Communications Group (???-Present)

== Previous designations ==
- 32d Combat Communications Squadron (???-Present)

== Bases stationed ==
- Tinker AFB, Oklahoma (???-Present)

== Commanders ==
- 1986-1988 Capt David A. Cotton
- 1988–1990 Major Alan Stemen

== Decorations ==
- Air Force Outstanding Unit Award

== See also ==
- 3d Combat Communications Squadron
