= Dale Meyerrose =

United States Air Force general

Dr. Dale W. Meyerrose Major General (Ret.)
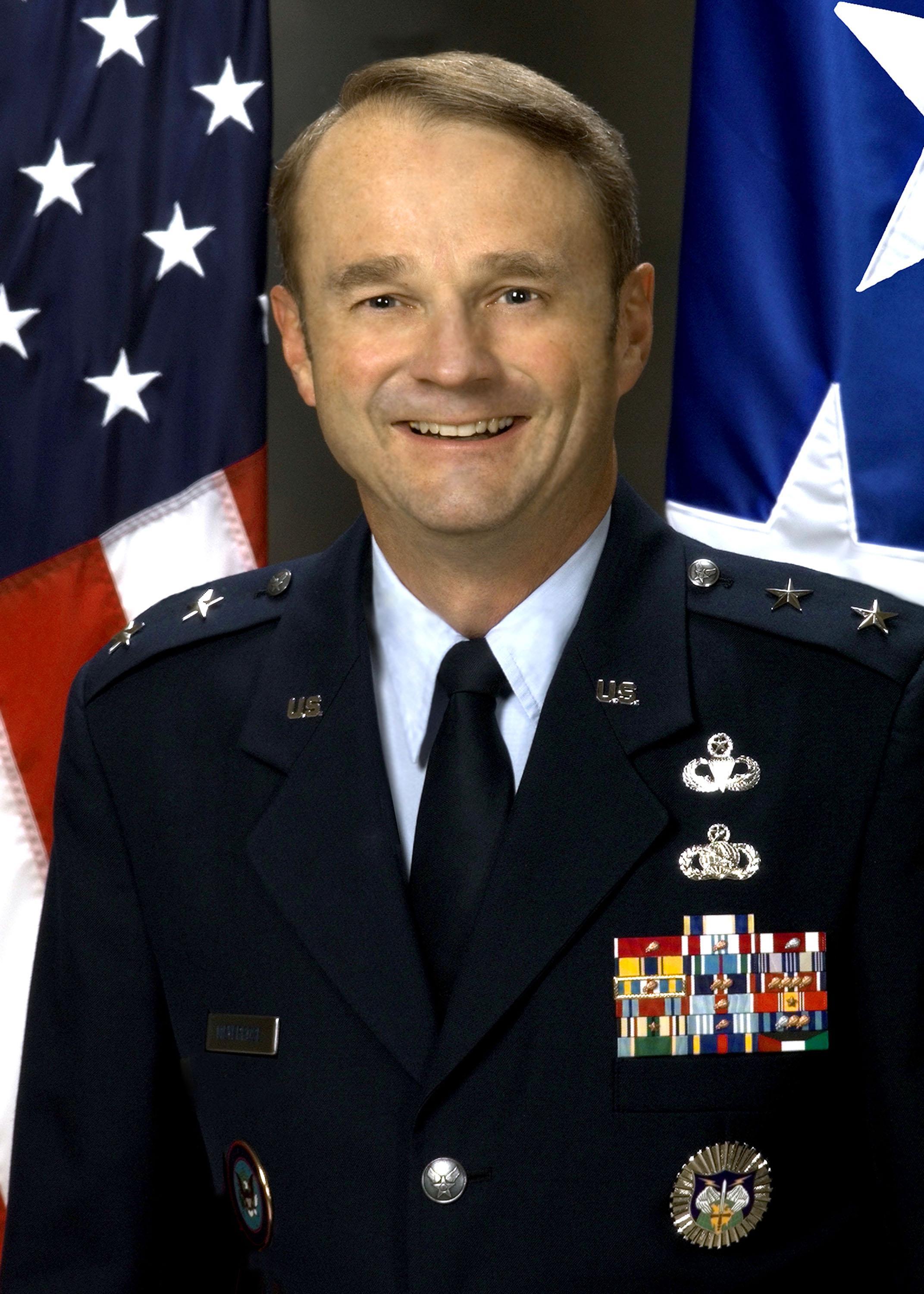
- Born: April 29, 1953 (age 73); Indianapolis, Indiana, U.S.
- Military career
- Allegiance: United States
- Branch: United States Air Force
- Service years: 1975-2005
- Rank: Major General
- Awards: See below
- Other work: U.S. Intelligence Community Chief Information Officer

Dr. Dale W. Meyerrose, Major General (Retired) was the first President-appointed, Senate-confirmed Associate Director of National Intelligence/Intelligence Community Chief Information Officer (CIO) and Information Sharing Executive for the Director of National Intelligence (DNI).

Dr. Meyerrose is president of the MeyerRose Group, LLC, a company that consults with a wide range of business, government, and academic organizations on strategy, business planning, technology, education, and executive development issues. He is a visiting associate professor at the School of Information Studies, Syracuse University. He is an adjunct professor at Carnegie Mellon University's School of Computer of Science with the Institute for Software Research and director for the Cybersecurity Leadership (CSL) certificate program. Additionally, Dr. Meyerrose is a Trustee and Treasurer for the U.S. Air Force Academy Falcon Foundation. He was formerly the president and chairman of the board for the Air Force Historical Foundation, and advisor to the U.S. Air Force Heritage Program.

Dr. Meyerrose was recently a vice president and general manager for Harris Corporation, a Global Fortune 500 company. He was responsible for leading all aspects of strategy, business development and program execution for cyber growth initiatives across the corporation—and participated in multiple merger and acquisition activities.

In 2018, Dr. Meyerrose became president and chairman of the board for Imcon International, Inc. and joined the Board of Directors of ThinkRF.

== Government career ==
Dr. Meyerrose was the first President-appointed, Senate-confirmed Associate Director of National Intelligence/Intelligence Community Chief Information Officer (CIO) and Information Sharing Executive for the Director of National Intelligence (DNI). He managed activities relating to the information technology infrastructure and enterprise requirements of the U.S. Intelligence Community. He had the procurement approval authority over all information technology items related to the enterprise architectures of all Intelligence Community components. He directed and managed all information technology-related procurement for the Intelligence Community and ensured that all expenditures for information technology and research and development activities were consistent with government enterprise architectures. He also led the information sharing strategy and policy for the Intelligence Community. This position was created by the 2004 Intelligence Reform and Terrorism Protection Act.

Dr. Meyerrose initiated an effort to test and ultimately use blogs as a tool for intelligence gathering. While the blogosphere is well known amongst Internet users, it was new terrain for the secure information culture of the intelligence community. Recognizing the trappings of large scale initiatives, Dr. Meyerrose pursued "thinking big, starting small, and scaling fast" through the use of Web 2.0 technology. He fostered the development of Intellipedia and pilot projects such as a U.S. government-wide focused on avian flu, in which participants numbered in the tens-of-thousands in just a few months. Information sharing contributions were made worldwide, and content and quality grew rapidly, becoming the impetus for information sharing across the U.S. government.

== Military career ==
While on military active duty, Major General Dale W. Meyerrose served as chief information officer of three major U.S. Air Force Commands and three unified U.S. military combatant commands. He was the director of Command Control Systems for the North American Aerospace Defense Command during 9/11, helping to safeguard the air sovereignty of North America. He subsequently became the first chief information officer for U.S. Northern Command, the first modern U.S. military command responsible for homeland defense. General Meyerrose served as the director of communications for coalition task forces supporting post-DESERT STORM operations in Southwest Asia and subsequent combat operations in the Balkan Peninsula.

In his last military assignment, General Meyerrose was the Director of Command Control Systems, Headquarters North American Aerospace Defense Command, and Director of Architectures and Integration, Headquarters U.S. Northern Command, Peterson Air Force Base, Colorado. He also served as the Chief Information Officer and Air Force Element Commander for Air Force personnel for both commands. General Meyerrose ensured the availability and performance of the command and control systems to safeguard the air sovereignty of North America. He facilitated communications and information sharing for military assistance to civil authorities for incident response responsibilities assigned to Northern Command.

Born in Indianapolis, Indiana, General Meyerrose entered the Air Force in 1975 after graduating from the United States Air Force Academy. The general wears the master communications badge and is a master parachutist.

== Education ==
- 1971 Hamilton Heights High School, Arcadia, Indiana
- 1975 Bachelor of Science degree in economics, U.S. Air Force Academy, Colorado Springs, Colorado
- 1977 Distinguished graduate, Squadron Officer School, Maxwell AFB, Alabama
- 1978 Master of Business Administration degree, University of Utah
- 1992 National War College, Fort Lesley J. McNair, Washington D.C.
- 2000 Senior Information Warfare Applications Course, Maxwell AFB, Alabama
- 2001 Program for National and International Security, John F. Kennedy School of Government, Harvard University, Cambridge, Massachusetts
- 2003 Joint Flag Officer Warfighting Course, Maxwell AFB, Alabama
- 2005 United States Navy Executive Business Course, Haas School of Business, University of California, Berkeley, at the Naval Postgraduate School, Monterey, California
- 2007 Leadership for Cross-Boundary Transformation, John F. Kennedy School of Government, Harvard University, Cambridge, Massachusetts
- 2009 Leadership Directions Program, Darden School of Business, University of Virginia, Charlottesville, Virginia
- 2014 Doctor of Professional Studies in Information Management, School of Information Studies, Syracuse University, Syracuse, New York

== Military Assignments ==
1. July 1975 - February 1976, distinguished graduate, Communications-Electronics Officer Course, Keesler Air Force Base, Mississippi
2. February 1976 - April 1977, maintenance officer, 4th Combat Communications Group, Altus Air Force Base, Oklahoma
3. May 1977 - June 1979, aide-de-camp, later, assistant executive officer to the Commander, European Communications Division, Kapaun Air Station, West Germany
4. June 1979 - June 1980, aide-de-camp to the Commander, Air Force Communications Command, Scott Air Force Base, Illinois
5. June 1980 - February 1982, Chief of Maintenance, 1974th Communications Group, Scott Air Force Base, Illinois
6. March 1982 - March 1983, member and Air Staff Training Program officer, Secretary of the Air Force Personnel Council, Washington, D.C.
7. March 1983 - May 1985, Chief, Long-Haul Information Systems, later, point of contact, Command, Control and Communications Systems Panel, Headquarters U.S. Air Force, Washington, D.C.
8. June 1985 - July 1987, Commander, 2048th Communications Squadron, Carswell Air Force Base, Texas
9. July 1987 - June 1990, Communications Support Officer, National Military Command Center, the Joint Staff, Washington, D.C.
10. June 1990 - July 1991, Chief, Future Concepts, Deputy Chief of Staff for Command, Control, Communications and Computers, Headquarters U.S. Air Force, Washington, D.C.
11. August 1991 - June 1992, student, National War College, Fort Lesley J. McNair, Washington, D.C.
12. July 1992 - June 1994, Commander, 3rd Combat Communications Group, Tinker Air Force Base, Oklahoma (February 1993 - May 1993, Director of Communications, Operation Southern Watch, Riyadh, Saudi Arabia)
13. July 1994 - December 1996, Director of Communications and Information and Chief Information Officer, Headquarters U.S. Air Forces in Europe, Ramstein Air Base, Germany
14. December 1996 - June 2000, Director of Communications and Information and Chief Information Officer, Headquarters Air Combat Command, Langley Air Force Base, Virginia
15. June 2000 - October 2002, Director of Command Control Systems and Chief Information Officer, Headquarters North American Aerospace Defense Command and U.S. Space Command, and Director of Communications and Information and Chief Information Officer, Headquarters Air Force Space Command, Peterson Air Force Base, Colorado
16. October 2002 - 2005, Director of Command Control Systems and Chief Information Officer, Headquarters North American Aerospace Defense Command, and Director of Architectures and Integration and Chief Information Officer, Headquarters U.S. Northern Command, Peterson Air Force Base, Colorado

== Awards and decorations ==
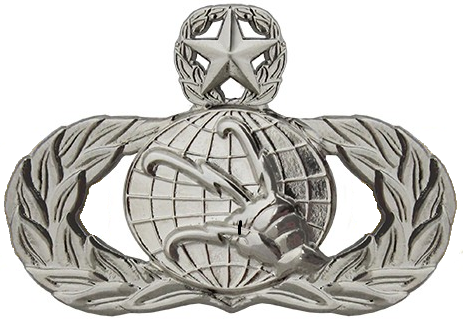
Master Parachutist Badge
Master Communications and Information Badge

Personal decorations
	Air Force Distinguished Service Medal
	Defense Superior Service Medal
Width-44 crimson ribbon with a pair of width-2 white stripes on the edges	Legion of Merit with oak leaf cluster
	Defense Meritorious Service Medal with oak leaf cluster
Width-44 crimson ribbon with two width-8 white stripes at distance 4 from the edges.	Meritorious Service Medal with silver oak leaf cluster
	Air Force Commendation Medal
	Joint Service Achievement Medal
	Air Force Achievement Medal
Unit awards
	Joint Meritorious Unit Award with bronze oak leaf cluster
	Air Force Outstanding Unit Award with two bronze oak leaf clusters
	Air Force Organizational Excellence Award with four bronze oak leaf clusters
Service awards
	Combat Readiness Medal
	Air Force Recognition Ribbon with bronze oak leaf cluster
Campaign and service medals
Width=44 scarlet ribbon with a central width-4 golden yellow stripe, flanked by pairs of width-1 scarlet, white, Old Glory blue, and white stripes	National Defense Service Medal with two bronze stars
Width-44 ribbon with the following stripes, arranged symmetrically from the edges to the center: width-2 black, width-4 chamois, width-2 Old Glory blue, width-2 white, width-2 Old Glory red, width-6 chamouis, width-3 myrtle green up to a central width-2 black stripe	Southwest Asia Service Medal with bronze star
	Global War on Terrorism Service Medal
Service, training, and marksmanship awards
	Air Force Overseas Long Tour Service Ribbon with bronze oak leaf cluster
	Air Force Longevity Service Award with silver oak leaf cluster and two bronze oak leaf clusters
	Small Arms Expert Marksmanship Ribbon
	Air Force Training Ribbon
Foreign awards
	Kuwait Liberation Medal (Government of Kuwait)

=== Other achievements ===
- 1987 Outstanding Young AFCEAN Award, Armed Forces Communications and Electronics Association (AFCEA)
- 1992 Medal of Merit, AFCEA
- 1999 International AFCEAN of the Year, AFCEA
- 2005 "Top 100" Information Technology Professionals, Federal Computer Weekly
- 2007 "Premier 100", Computerworld
- 2007 "Federal List of Top Ten Power Players in Washington, DC, Federal Computer Weekly
- 2008 "North American Technology Leadership Award", Rocky Mountain AFCEA Chapter
- 2008 "Lifetime Public Service Award", Association of Federal Information Resource Managers
- 2008 "Outstanding Information technology Achievement in Government", Government Computer News
- 2008 "Public Service Award for Excellence in Public Leadership", Executive CIO Top 10 Leaders and Innovators
- 2008 "Lifetime Achievement Award", Air Force C4 Association
- 2008 National Intelligence Superior Service Medal
- 2008 National Geospatial-Intelligence Agency Medallion for Excellence
- 2011 "Thought Leadership Award", EMC2
- 2012 Air Force Communicators and Air Traffic Controllers Association Hall of Honor
- 2012 U.S. Air Force Cyberspace Operations and Support Hall of Fame
- 2014 Doctoral prize for Excellence in Scholarship and Research, School of Information Studies, Syracuse University
- 2015 Federal News Radio, "Federal Executive Forum" Hall of Fame
- 2020 AFCEA International Distinguished Life Member award

== Effective dates of promotion ==
Promotions
Insignia	Rank	Date
	Major General	March 1, 2002
	Brigadier General	October 1, 1998
	Colonel	January 1, 1992
	Lieutenant Colonel	July 1, 1988
	Major	August 1, 1984
	Captain	June 4, 1979
	First Lieutenant	June 4, 1977
	Second Lieutenant	June 4, 1975
