= Independent Colleges and Universities of Florida =

Group of colleges in Florida, United States

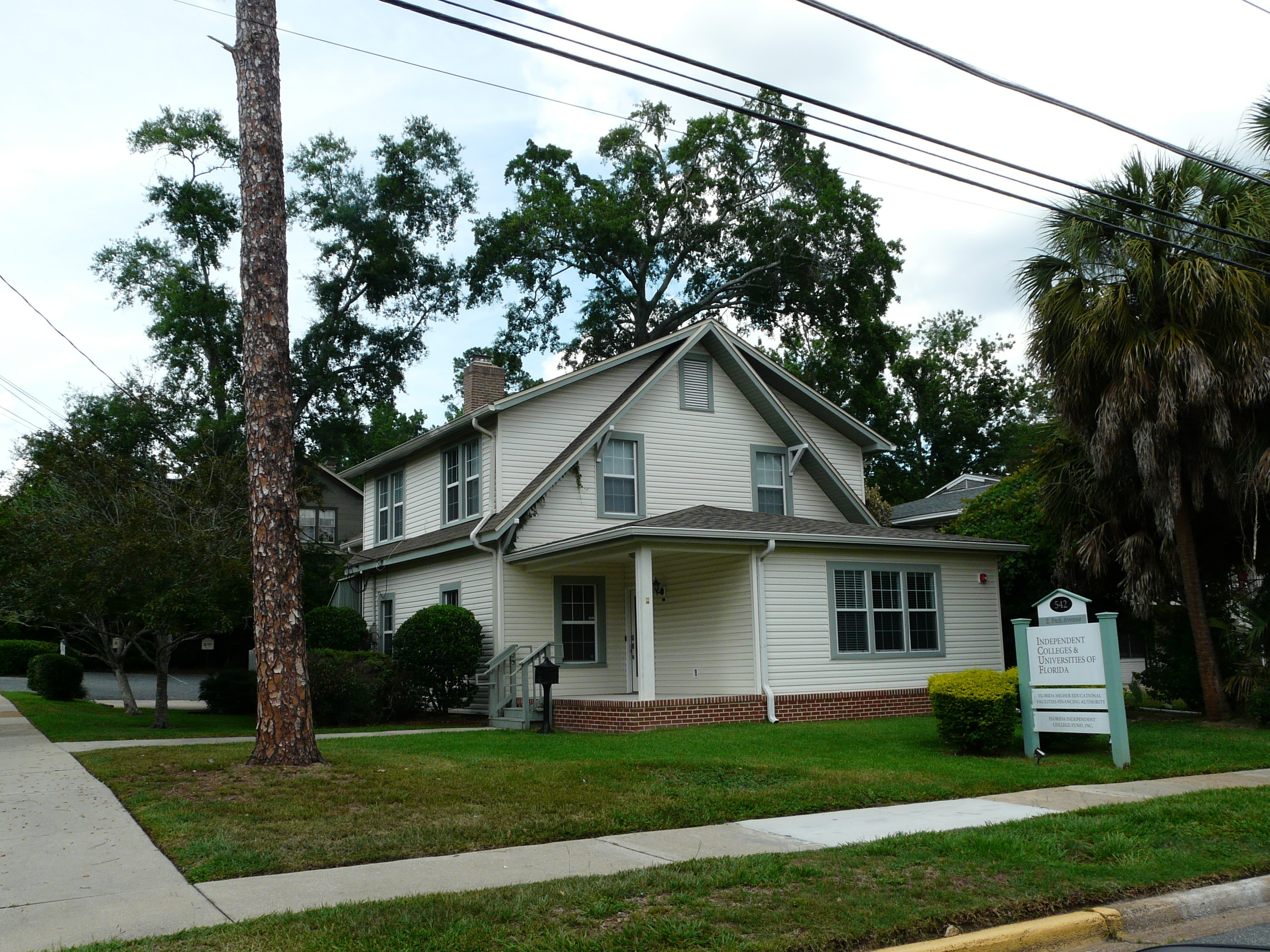
- Headquarters in Tallahassee, Florida
- Type: Association of private colleges and universities
- Established: 1956
- President: Robert J. Boyd
- Location: Tallahassee, Florida, U.S.
- Website: www.icuf.org

The Independent Colleges and Universities of Florida (ICUF) is a voluntary association of 30 private colleges and universities in the U.S. state of Florida. Like the 12 public universities in Florida, all ICUF schools are accredited by the Southern Association of Colleges and Schools. The current president is Robert J. Boyd. ICUF institutions issue nearly one-third of college degrees at the baccalaureate level and above in Florida.

== Members ==
University	Location	Established	Acceptance rate	Students (Fall 2019)	Campus area (acres)	Alumni
AdventHealth University	Orlando	1992	65%	1,688	9	
Ave Maria University	Ave Maria	1998	48%	1,177	1000	
Barry University	Miami Shores	1940	57%	7,401	122	Alumni
Beacon College	Leesburg	1989	63%	416	12	
Bethune-Cookman University	Daytona Beach	1904	77%	2,901	85	Alumni
Eckerd College	St. Petersburg	1958	67%	2,007	188	Alumni
Edward Waters University	Jacksonville	1866	82%	3,085	23	
Embry-Riddle Aeronautical University	Daytona Beach	1925	78%	7,056	406	Alumni
Everglades University	Boca Raton	1998	96%	2,104	4	
Flagler College	St. Augustine	1968	40%	2,902	19	
Florida College	Temple Terrace	1942	85%	538	20	
Florida Institute of Technology	Melbourne	1958	57%	6,022	130	
Florida Memorial University	Miami Gardens	1879	80%	1,097	44	
Florida Southern College	Lakeland	1883	58%	3,305	100	Alumni
Hodges University	Naples	1990	79%	977	16	
Jacksonville University	Jacksonville	1934	39%	4,164	190	Alumni
Keiser University	Fort Lauderdale	1977	68%	19,567	N/A	
Lynn University	Boca Raton	1962	68%	3,247	123	
Nova Southeastern University	Fort Lauderdale	1964	58%	20,576	480	Alumni
Palm Beach Atlantic University	West Palm Beach	1968	78%	3,691	120	
Ringling College of Art and Design	Sarasota	1931	73%	1,658	35	
Rollins College	Winter Park	1885	58%	3,127	70	Alumni
Saint Leo University	Saint Leo	1889	71%	10,912	170	Alumni
St. Thomas University	Miami Gardens	1961	65%	4,824	140	Alumni
Southeastern University	Lakeland	1935	78%	9,894	68	
Stetson University	DeLand	1883	64%	4,429	174	
University of Miami	Coral Gables	1925	37%	17,811	230	Alumni
The University of Tampa	Tampa	1931	49%	9,628	100	Alumni
Warner University	Lake Wales	1968	60%	1,058	380	
Webber International University	Babson Park	1927	57%	735	110	
