= KVUJ =

KVUJ may refer to:

- KVUJ (FM), a radio station (91.1 FM) licensed to serve Lake Jackson, Texas, United States
- the ICAO code for Stanly County Airport
