= 118 Squadron =

118 Squadron or 118th Squadron may refer to:

- 118 Squadron (Israel)
- No. 118 Squadron RCAF, Canada
- No. 118 Squadron RAF, United Kingdom
- 118th Aero Squadron, created in August 1917 on Kelly Field, Texas as an Air Service, United States Army unit; re-designated in February 1918; see 118th Airlift Squadron
- 118th Aero Squadron, created in April 1918 on Brooks Field, Texas as an Air Service, United States Army unit; re-designated in July 1918
- 118th Airlift Squadron, United States Air Force
- 118th Air Support Operations Squadron, United States Air Force
- 118th Fighter Squadron, United States Air Force
- 118th Observation Squadron, United States Army Air Force
- VPB-118, United States Navy

== See also ==
- 118th Wing
