= List of Saint Leo University alumni =

This list of Saint Leo University alumni includes graduates, and non-graduate former students, of Saint Leo University.

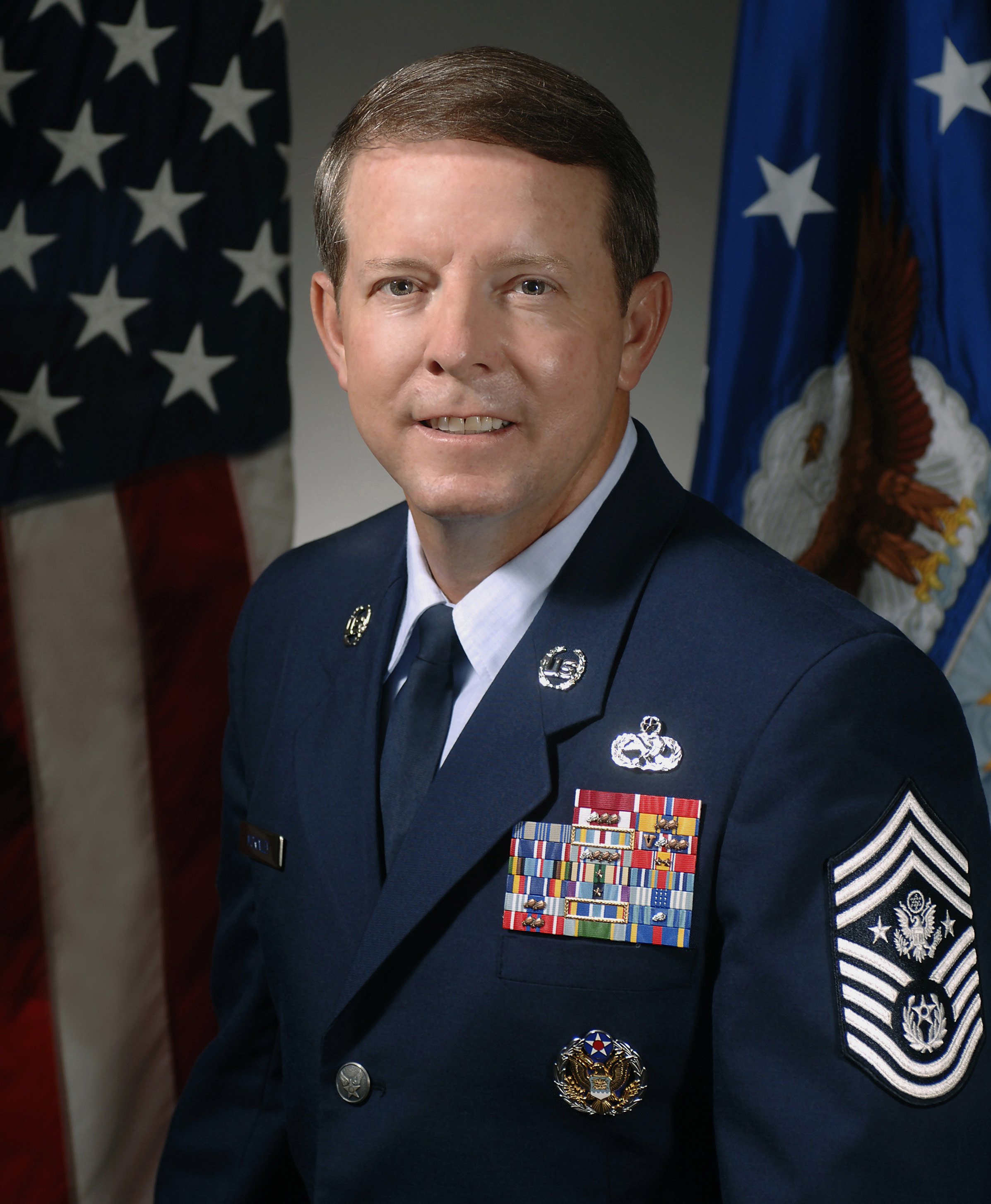
Rodney J. McKinley

Alumni	Notability
Fred Cambria	Former Major League Baseball pitcher (attended, not a graduate)
Richard Corcoran	Former speaker of the Florida House of Representatives
Jim Corsi	Deceased former Major League Baseball pitcher and World Series champion (attended, not a graduate)
Brian Dayett	Former Major League Baseball outfielder (attended, not a graduate)
Frank DiPino	Former Major League Baseball pitcher (attended, not a graduate)
Clarence Ervin	North Carolina Air National Guard brigadier general
Rodney J. McKinley	Former chief master sergeant of the U.S. Air Force 2006–2009
Sankar Montoute	Former NFL player, for one season
Ed Narain	Former representative, Florida House of Representatives
J.P. Ricciardi	Special advisor to the president of baseball operations for the San Francisco Giants (attended, not a graduate)
Erika Shields	Former chief of police, Atlanta Police Department
Bob Tewksbury	Former Major League Baseball pitcher, 1992 All-Star, mental skills coordinator for the Chicago Cubs (attended, not a graduate)
George N. Turner	Former chief of police, Atlanta Police Department
