= 118th Air Support Operations Squadron =

- Active: 1951–
- Country: United States
- Allegiance: North Carolina
- Branch: Air National Guard
- Type: Squadron
- Role: Air Support Operations
- Part of: North Carolina Air National Guard

Insignia
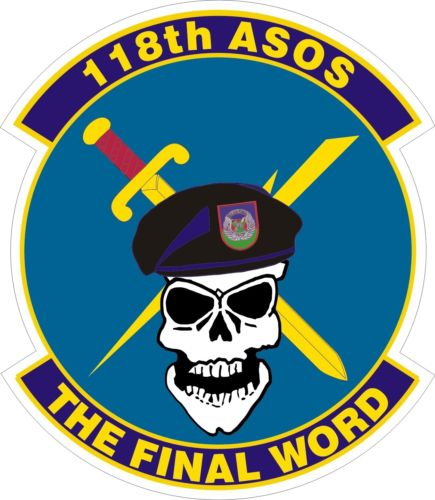
- Insignia of the 118th ASOS.

The 118th Air Support Operations Squadron (118 ASOS) is a combat support unit of the North Carolina Air National Guard. it is located in Badin, North Carolina. The 118th ASOS provides Tactical Command and Control of air power assets to the Joint Forces Air Component Commander and Joint Forces Land Component Commander for combat operations.

== History ==
The 118th Air Support Operations Squadron (118 ASOS) at the Stanly County Air National Guard Station Stanly County Airport was originally formed as the 118th Aircraft Control and Warning Squadron (118 ACWS) in Charlotte, North Carolina. The Detachment of the squadron that would become the 118 ASOS was initially formed in Wadesboro, North Carolina, and designated Detachment A.

While designated the 118 ACWS the unit was ordered to active duty during the Korean War with three squadrons of the Georgia Air National Guard on 8 January 1951. On 2 January 1952, the 118 ACWS arrived in French Morocco, North Africa, and set up operations about 20 miles (32 km) from the city of Casablanca. Unit personnel calibrated numerous early warning radar sites for the Strategic Air Command forward deployed bomber force in the Sahara, and in the Atlas mountains in Morocco. From 8 October 1952 until 1999, the unit functioned as a separate state-of-the-art USAF communications squadron.

In 1999 the Air Force, realizing a shortfall, chose to re-role the 118th Combat Communications Squadron into the 118th Air Support Operations Squadron. With this new mission the unit has gone from a front-line communications unit to a unit in direct support of the Army war fighter, coordinating fixed-wing fighter, attack and bomber aircraft, and rotary-wing attack aircraft, in providing close air support (CAS) to ground combat maneuver units. In its Title 32 USC role, the 118 ASOS currently is tasked with supporting both the North Carolina Army National Guard and South Carolina Army National Guard units, while its Title 10 USC role supports both Active Component and Reserve Component units for both stateside training and for overseas contingencies where it provides tactical command and control of air power assets to the Joint Forces Air Component Commander (JFACC) and Joint Forces Land Component Commander (JFLCC) for combat operations.
