= List of Florida Southern College alumni =

This list of Florida Southern College alumni includes graduates and former students of Florida Southern College.

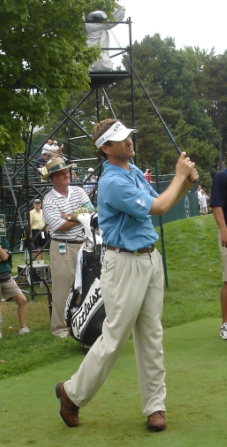
Lee Janzen

Alumnus	Notability
Abdallah Salem el-Badri	Secretary general of OPEC (1994, 2007–2016)
Ross Baumgarten	Major League Baseball pitcher
Robert M. Blackburn	Bishop of the United Methodist Church (B.A., 1941)
Andrew M. Boss	Composer, pianist, and conductor, known for his works for wind ensemble (B.M., 2011)
Emma Cannon	Basketball player for the Israeli women's national team Elitzur Ramla
Charleene Closshey	Actress, musician, and producer of the first film released via blockchain technology
Rob Dibble	Former pitcher for the Cincinnati Reds of Major League Baseball
Eric Eisnaugle	Judge of the Florida Fifth District Court of Appeal
Jim France	CEO and chairman of NASCAR
Robert L. Goulet	CEO of Entertainment Sports Partners
Lee Janzen	Professional golfer on the PGA Tour
Matt Joyce	Former Major League outfielder
Neal Justin	Politician and professor
R. Fred Lewis	Former chief justice for the Florida Supreme Court
Marshall MacClellan	Anglican bishop
Juan Mari Brás	Puerto Rican lawyer, advocate for Puerto Rican independence, founding member of Puerto Rican Socialist Party
Andy McGaffigan	Former Major League pitcher; eleven seasons in the majors
Robert L. McLendon, Jr.	Former president of St. Johns River Community College
Rocco Mediate	Professional golfer on the PGA Tour
Lance Niekro	Former Major League first baseman; four seasons in the majors
Morgan Ortagus	Television commentator, financial analyst, and political advisor who served as spokesperson for the U.S. State Department
Richard Rogers	Notorious serial killer known as "The Last Call Killer" who murdered and dismembered gay and bisexual men in New York City from 1992 to 1993; subject of HBO's 2023 true crime documentary miniseries Last Call: When a Serial Killer Stalked Queer New York
Scott Thuman	Political correspondent
Brett Tomko	Former Major League pitcher; 11 seasons in the majors
David Toups	Bishop of Beaumont: attended classes but did not earn a degree
Dylan Travis	Basketball player; United States men's national 3x3 team; 2024 Paris Olympic Games
Baxter Troutman	Member of the Florida House of Representatives
Stephen Wise	Member of the Florida Senate
