= North Carolina Air National Guard =

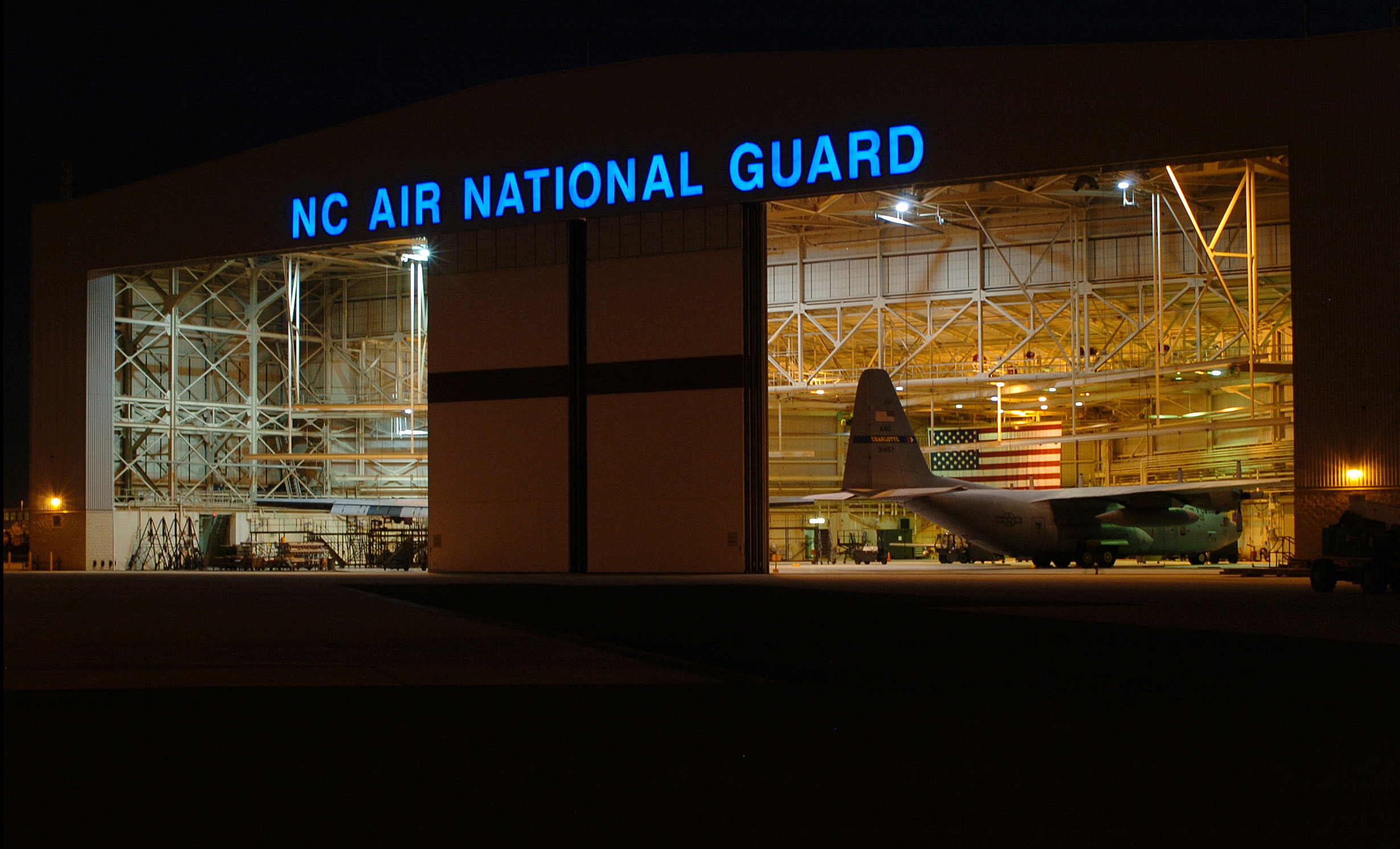
- C-130 Hercules Cargo aircraft in the main hangar at Charlotte Air National Guard Base, North Carolina
- Active: 1947–present
- Country: United States
- Allegiance: North Carolina
- Branch: Air National Guard
- Type: State militia, military reserve force
- Role: "To meet state and federal mission responsibilities"
- Part of: North Carolina National Guard; United States National Guard Bureau; National Guard
- Headquarters: Raleigh, North Carolina
- Motto: "We stand ready"

Commanders
- Civilian leadership: President Donald Trump (Commander-in-Chief); Troy Meink (Secretary of the Air Force); Governor Josh Stein (Governor of North Carolina)
- Adjutant General of North Carolina: Major General M. Todd Hunt

Insignia
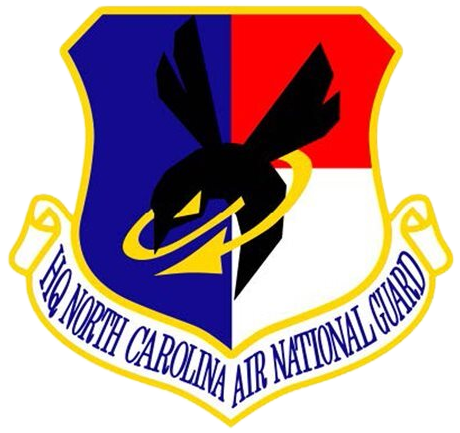
- Emblem

Aircraft flown
- Transport: Boeing C-17 Globemaster III

The North Carolina Air National Guard (NCANG) is the aerial militia of the State of North Carolina, United States of America. It is a reserve of the United States Air Force and along with the North Carolina Army National Guard an element of the North Carolina National Guard of the larger United States National Guard Bureau.

As state militia units, the units in the North Carolina Air National Guard are not in the normal United States Air Force chain of command. They are under the jurisdiction of the governor of North Carolina through the office of the North Carolina Adjutant General unless they are federalized by order of the president of the United States. The North Carolina Air National Guard is headquartered in Raleigh, and its commander is Major General M. Todd Hunt.

== Overview ==
Under the "Total Force" concept, North Carolina Air National Guard units are considered to be Air Reserve Components (ARC) of the United States Air Force (USAF). North Carolina ANG units are trained and equipped by the Air Force and are operationally gained by a major command of the USAF if federalized. In addition, the North Carolina Air National Guard forces are assigned to Air Expeditionary Forces and are subject to deployment tasking orders along with their active duty and Air Force Reserve counterparts in their assigned cycle deployment window.

Along with their federal reserve obligations, as state militia units the elements of the North Carolina ANG are subject to being activated by order of the governor to provide protection of life and property, and preserve peace, order and public safety. State missions include disaster relief in times of earthquakes, hurricanes, floods and forest fires, search and rescue, protection of vital public services, and support to civil defense.

== Components ==
The North Carolina Air National Guard (NC ANG) consists of the following major unit:

- 145th Airlift Wing

Established 15 March 1948 (as: 156th Fighter Squadron); operates: C-17 Globemaster III. The last C-130H Hercules left on 18 December 2017; the first C-17 arrived on 7 April 2018.
Stationed at: Charlotte Air National Guard Base, Charlotte
Gained by: Air Mobility Command
Provides tactical airlift capability to the United States Military and deliver supplies wherever needed

The NC ANG also contains the following support units and capabilities:

- 118th Air Support Operations Squadron

Stationed at: Stanly County Airport. The 118th ASOS provides Tactical Command and Control of air power assets to the Joint Forces Air Component Commander and Joint Forces Land Component Commander for combat operations.

- 235th Air Traffic Control Squadron

Stationed at: Stanly County Airport. Mobile Air Traffic Control.

- 263rd Combat Communications Squadron

Stationed at: Stanly County Airport. Provides theater communications for the Commander of the United States Central Command.

- 156th Weather Flight

Stationed at: Stanly County Airport. Combat weather team.

== History ==
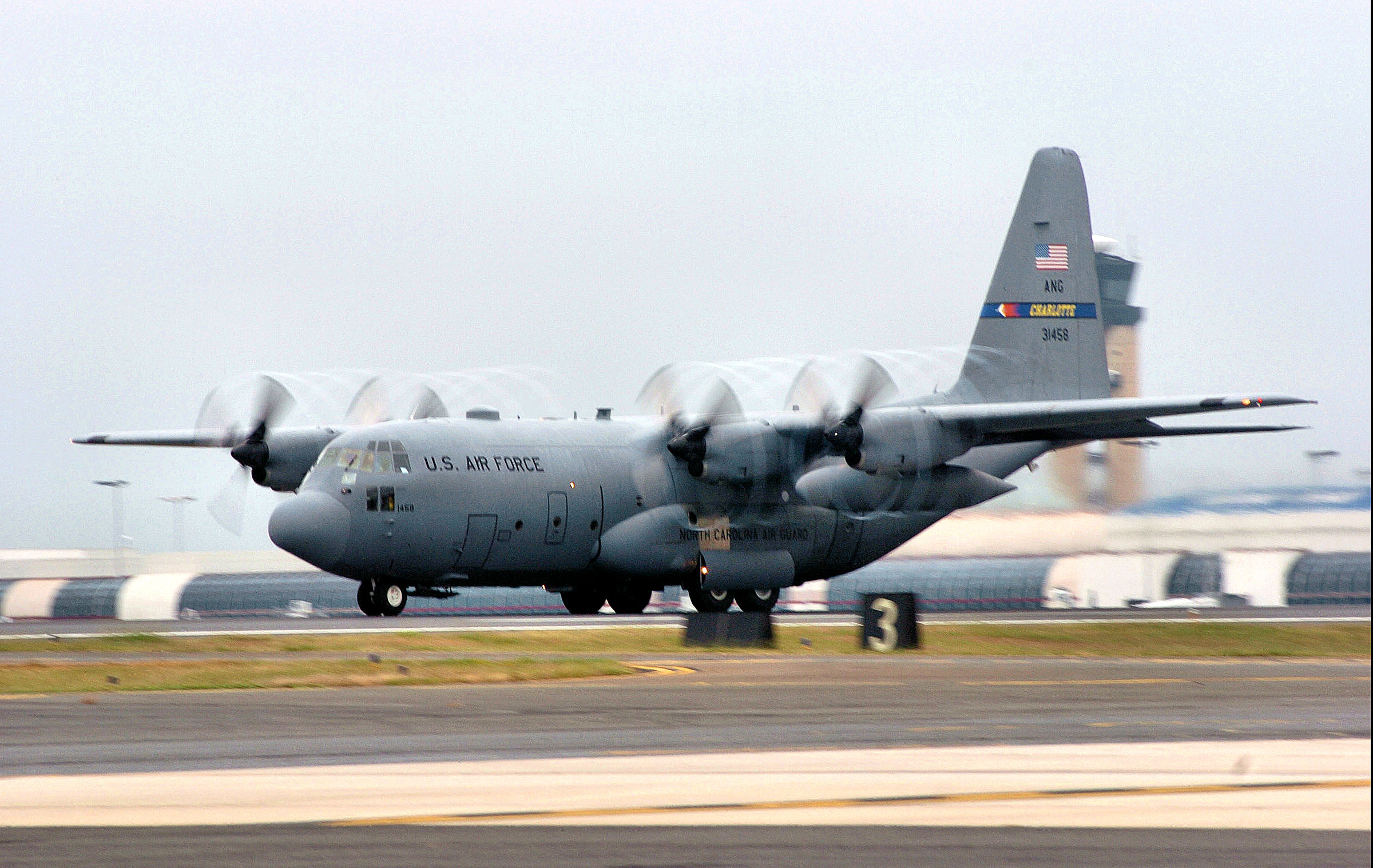
A Lockheed C-130H Hercules of the 156th Airlift Squadron. The 156th is the oldest unit in the North Carolina Air National Guard, with over 60 years of service.

On 24 May 1946, the United States Army Air Forces, in response to dramatic postwar military budget cuts imposed by President Harry S. Truman, allocated inactive unit designations to the National Guard Bureau for the formation of an Air Force National Guard. These unit designations were allotted and transferred to various State National Guard bureaus to provide them unit designations to re-establish them as Air National Guard units.

The North Carolina Air National Guard origins date to 15 March 1948 with the establishment of the 156th Fighter Squadron and is oldest unit of the North Carolina Air National Guard. It was federally recognized and activated at Morris Field, near Charlotte and was equipped with F-47D Thunderbolts. Its mission was the air defense of the state.

In 1950 the 156th was re-equipped with former World War II F-51 Mustangs, now designated RF-51D which had been used in the United States in a training role. The squadron became part of Tactical Air Command (TAC) as a Tactical Reconnaissance Squadron. The 156th Fighter Squadron was federalized due to the Korean War on 10 October 1950. During its federalization period, the 157th was deployed to Toul-Rosières Air Base, departing for Europe in January 1952. On 9 July 1952 the activated North Carolina Air National Guard was released from active duty and returned to state control.

In 1955 the facilities at Morris Field were expanded, two years later the 145th Fighter Group was organized consisting of the 156th Fighter Squadron and subordinate units. In 1960 the 145th FG group was redesignated the 145th Aeromedical Transport Group flying evacuation missions. In 1964 the 145th ATG was redesignated 145th Air Transport Group (Heavy). From 1966 to 1971 the 145th ATG was deployed to Vietnam, flying over 20 million km without an aircraft accident.

In 1990 North Carolina Army and Air National Guard units were mobilized for Operation Desert Shield, followed by Operation Desert Storm in 1991. Personnel from the 145th Airlift Wing were deployed to Germany and other locations. In 1995 North Carolina Army and Air National Guard troops were mobilized for service in Bosnia, Hungary, and Germany.

After the September 11th, 2001 terrorist attacks on the United States, elements of every Air National Guard unit in North Carolina have been activated in support of the global war on terrorism. Flight crews, aircraft maintenance personnel, communications technicians, air controllers and air security personnel were engaged in Operation Noble Eagle air defense overflights of major United States cities. Also, North Carolina ANG units have been deployed overseas as part of Operation Enduring Freedom in Afghanistan and Operation Iraqi Freedom in Iraq as well as other locations as directed.

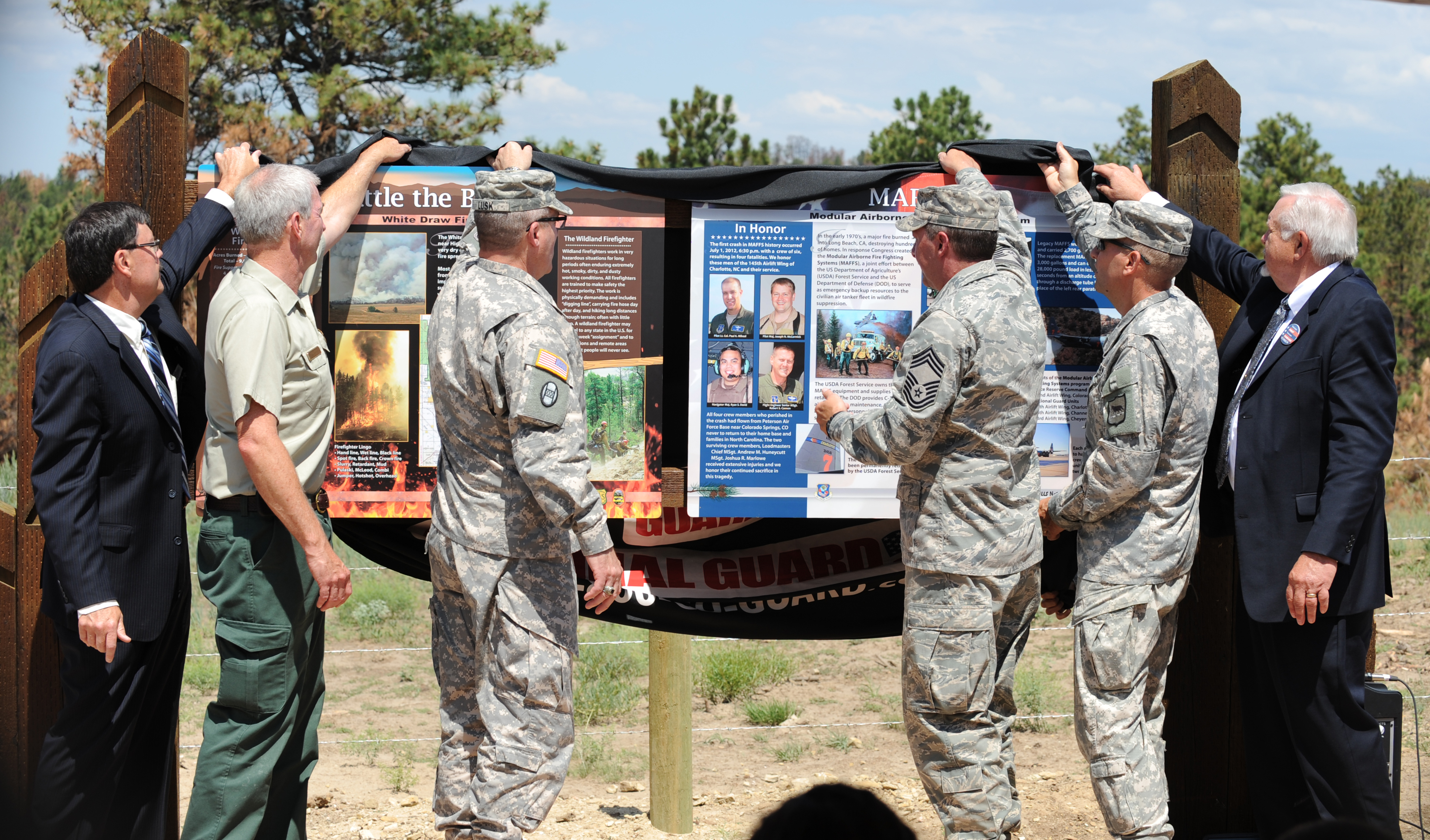
Airmen of the C-130 aircraft that crashed on 1 July 2012, while fighting the White Draw Fire, being honored at a ceremony

In 2012, the White Draw Fire burned 8 miles northeast of Edgemont, South Dakota. On 1 July 2012, an NC Air National Guard C-130 aircraft that was tasked as a Modular Airborne FireFighting System crashed, killing four military personnel and injuring two.

On 18 December 2015, Clarence Ervin became the first African-American chief of staff of the North Carolina Air National Guard in its history.
