= Justin Simmons (American football) =

American football player (born 1993)

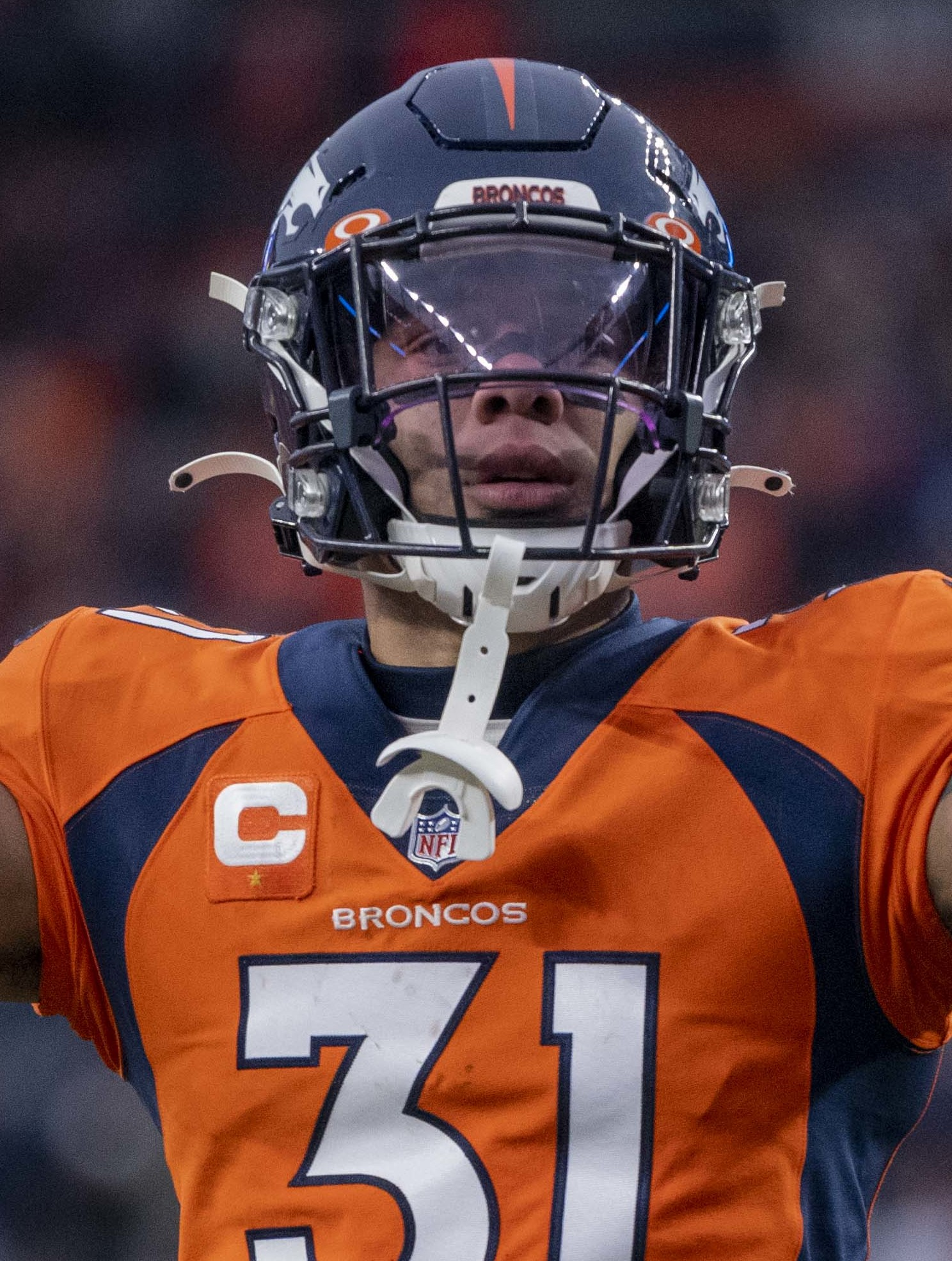
- Simmons with the Denver Broncos in 2021

No. 31
- Position: Safety

Personal information
- Born: November 19, 1993 (age 32); Manassas, Virginia, U.S.
- Listed height: 6 ft 2 in (1.88 m)
- Listed weight: 215 lb (98 kg)

Career information
- High school: Martin County (Stuart, Florida)
- College: Boston College (2012–2015)
- NFL draft: 2016: 3rd round, 98th overall pick

Career history
- Denver Broncos (2016–2023); Atlanta Falcons (2024)

Awards and highlights
- 4× Second-team All-Pro (2019, 2021–2023); 2× Pro Bowl (2020, 2023); NFL Interceptions co-leader (2022); Second-team All-ACC (2015)

Career NFL statistics
- Total tackles: 666
- Sacks: 4.5
- Pass deflections: 71
- Interceptions: 32
- Forced fumbles: 5
- Fumble recoveries: 3
- Defensive touchdowns: 1
- Stats at Pro Football Reference

Justin Simmons (born November 19, 1993) is an American former professional football player who was a safety in the National Football League (NFL) for nine seasons, primarily with the Denver Broncos. He played college football for the Boston College Eagles and was selected by the Broncos in the third round of the 2016 NFL draft. Simmons also played for the Atlanta Falcons. During his career, he was a four-time second-team All-Pro and two-time Pro Bowler.

== College career ==
Simmons attended Boston College, where he enrolled as a communication major in the Morrissey College of Arts and Sciences. While at Boston College, he played both safety and cornerback.

In 2012, as a freshman he appeared in all 12 of the Eagles games. He started six games at free safety and one at cornerback. He finished seventh on the team with 52 tackles, he was tied for the team lead with two forced fumbles. In 2013, as a sophomore, he appeared in all 13 games, he recorded 34 tackles, 22 solo tackles, and three pass break-ups. In 2014, as a junior, he started all 13 games, the first seven at free safety and the final six at right cornerback, moving due to injuries on the team. For the season, he led the team with 76 tackles, 63 solo and two interceptions. He finished second on the team with five pass breakups. Before the 2015 season, he was awarded the Jay McGillis Memorial Scholarship Award. For the season, as a senior, he started all 12 games at free safety. He finished the season third on the team with 67 tackles, 49 solo. He was tied for 20th in the nation and second in the conference with five interceptions and tied for first in the conference with three fumble recoveries. He was named Second-team All-Atlantic Coast Conference (ACC) by the Atlantic Coast Sports Media Association and ACC head coaches. He was also named Second-team All-ACC by Phil Steele and the Associated Press. He was named to Steele's All-American Fourth Team and ProFootballFocus.com All-America honorable mention.

== Professional career ==
=== Pre-draft ===
He attended the NFL Scouting Combine and had the fastest time in the 20-yard shuttle (3.85s) at the NFL Combine since 2006 (3.81s) and also tied Braxton Miller for the best time in the 60-yard shuttle (10.84s) performed at the NFL Combine since 2014 (10.72s). He was also second overall in the three-cone drill. On March 16, 2016, Simmons participated at Boston College's pro day, but chose to only perform the 40-yard dash (4.53s), 20-yard dash (2.62s), and 10-yard dash (1.56s) and decided to forgo the other combine drills he had already performed well in. He performed private workouts for Dallas Cowboys and New Orleans Saints and attended pre-draft visits with the Pittsburgh Steelers and Detroit Lions. At the conclusion of the pre-draft process, NFL draft experts and scouts projected Simmons would be selected in the third round. He was ranked as the fourth best free safety prospect in the draft by DraftScout.com. NFL analyst Mike Mayock and Scouts Inc. ranked him as the sixth best safety prospect in the draft.

External videos
- Justin Simmons' NFL Combine Workout

Pre-draft measurables
Height	Weight	Arm length	Hand span	Wingspan	40-yard dash	10-yard split	20-yard split	20-yard shuttle	Three-cone drill	Vertical jump	Broad jump	Bench press
6 ft 2 3/8 in (1.89 m)	202 lb (92 kg)	32 5/8 in (0.83 m)	9 5/8 in (0.24 m)	6 ft 5 7/8 in (1.98 m)	4.53 s	1.56 s	2.62 s	3.85 s	6.58 s	40 in (1.02 m)	10 ft 6 in (3.20 m)	16 reps
All values from NFL Combine/Pro Day

=== Denver Broncos ===
External videos
- Broncos select Justin Simmons No. 98
- Flashback: Justin Simmons' draft day

The Denver Broncos selected Simmons in the third round (98th overall) of the 2016 NFL draft. He was the seventh safety drafted and was the first of only two players drafted from Boston College. Simmons was the first safety to be drafted from Boston College since Will Blackmon in 2006 and only the second since 2000.

==== 2016 ====
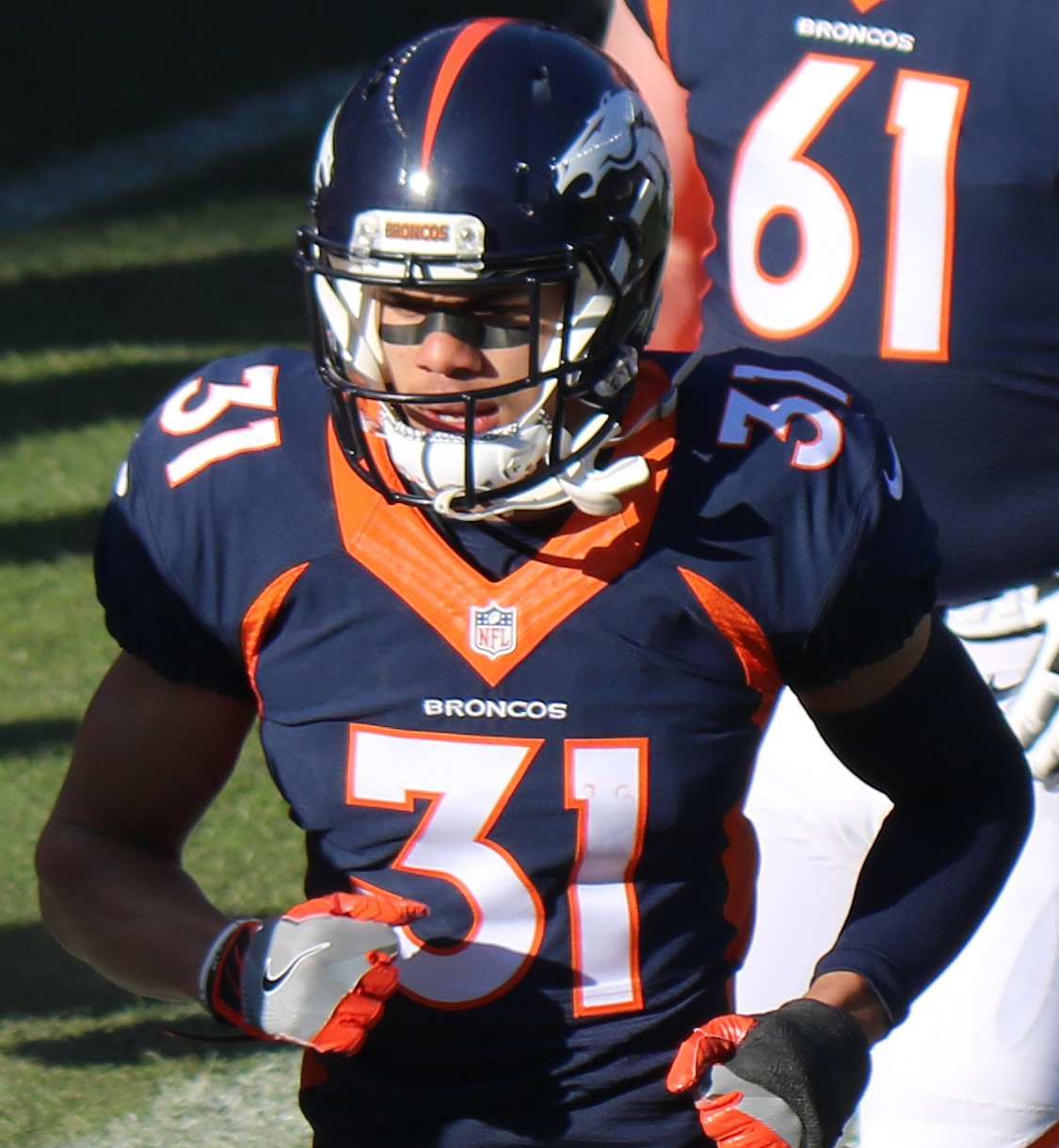
Simmons in 2016

On May 13, 2016, the Broncos signed Simmons to four–year, $3.06 million contract that includes a signing bonus of $645,420.

Simmons entered training camp slated as the primary backup safety. Head coach Gary Kubiak named Simmons the backup free safety to begin the regular season, behind Darian Stewart.

Simmons made his NFL debut in the Broncos' season-opener against the Carolina Panthers and recorded one tackle in the narrow 21–20 victory. Simmons was inactive for the Broncos' Week 3 victory at the Cincinnati Bengals due to a wrist injury. He was sidelined for two more games (Weeks 5–6) due to a small fracture in his wrist. In Week 8, Simmons recorded one tackle and made his first career sack as the Broncos defeated the San Diego Chargers 27–19. Simmons sacked Chargers' quarterback Philip Rivers for a nine-yard loss during the fourth quarter. On November 13, 2016, Simmons leaped over the offensive line and blocked an extra point attempt by New Orleans Saints' kicker Wil Lutz. Had the kick been successful, New Orleans would’ve taken a 24–23 lead with 1:22 remaining in the fourth quarter. The ball was recovered by Broncos teammate Will Parks and was returned for an 84-yard game-winning safety as the Broncos defeated the Saints 25–23. On December 18, 2016, Simmons earned his first career start and recorded two solo tackles during a 16–3 loss against the New England Patriots in Week 15. On December 25, 2016, Simmons started in place of T. J. Ward who sustained a concussion the previous week. He collected a season-high five combined tackles, broke up two passes, and made his first career interception in the Broncos' 33–10 loss at the Kansas City Chiefs in Week 16. Simmons intercepted a pass by Chiefs' quarterback Alex Smith, that was initially intended for wide receiver Tyreek Hill, and returned it for a 38-yard gain in the first quarter. Simmons finished his rookie season in 2016 with 30 combined tackles (25 solo), four pass deflections, two interceptions, and one sack in 13 games and three starts.

==== 2017 ====
On January 2, 2017, Broncos head coach Gary Kubiak announced his decision to retire due to health issues. Nine days later, Miami Dolphins defensive coordinator Vance Joseph was hired as the new head coach. Joseph hired Joe Woods to replace Wade Phillips as defensive coordinator. Simmons entered training camp slated as a backup safety but began competing against T.J. Ward to be the starting strong safety after impressing the coaching staff. Head coach Vance Joseph named Simmons the starting strong safety to begin the regular season and elected to release T. J. Ward as part of the Broncos' final roster cuts.

During Week 6, Simmons collected a season-high 11 solo tackles and deflected two passes during a 23–10 loss against the New York Giants. On December 3, 2017, he made seven combined tackles, broke up a pass attempt, and returned an interception for the first touchdown of his career during a 35–9 loss at the Dolphins in Week 13. Simmons intercepted a pass thrown by Dolphins' quarterback Jay Cutler, that was intended for wide receiver DeVante Parker, and returned it for a 65-yard touchdown during the third quarter. In the next game, Simmons injured his ankle while celebrating a strip/sack with Brandon Marshall during a 23–0 victory against the New York Jets. On December 13, 2017, he was placed on injured reserve due to a sprained ankle. He finished the season with 68 combined tackles (49 solo), five passes defensed, two interceptions, one sack, and one touchdown in 13 games and 13 starts.

==== 2018 ====
Simmons entered the Denver Broncos training camp slated as the starting free safety after a promising 2017 season. Head coach Vance Joseph named Simmons and Darian Stewart the starting safeties to begin 2018. In Week 11, he collected a season-high ten combined tackles (five solo) and deflected a pass during a 23–22 win at the Chargers. On December 2, 2018, Simmons made nine combined tackles, broke up a pass, and made his third interception of the season during a 24–10 victory at the Bengals in Week 13. He started all 16 games in 2018 and recorded a career-high 97 combined tackles (71 solo), four pass deflections, and three interceptions while playing every single defensive snap for the first time in his career. On December 31, 2018, the Broncos announced their decision to fire head coach Vance Joseph after they finished with a 6–10 record. He received an overall grade of 60.8 from Pro Football Focus, which ranked 74th among all qualified safeties in 2018.

==== 2019 ====
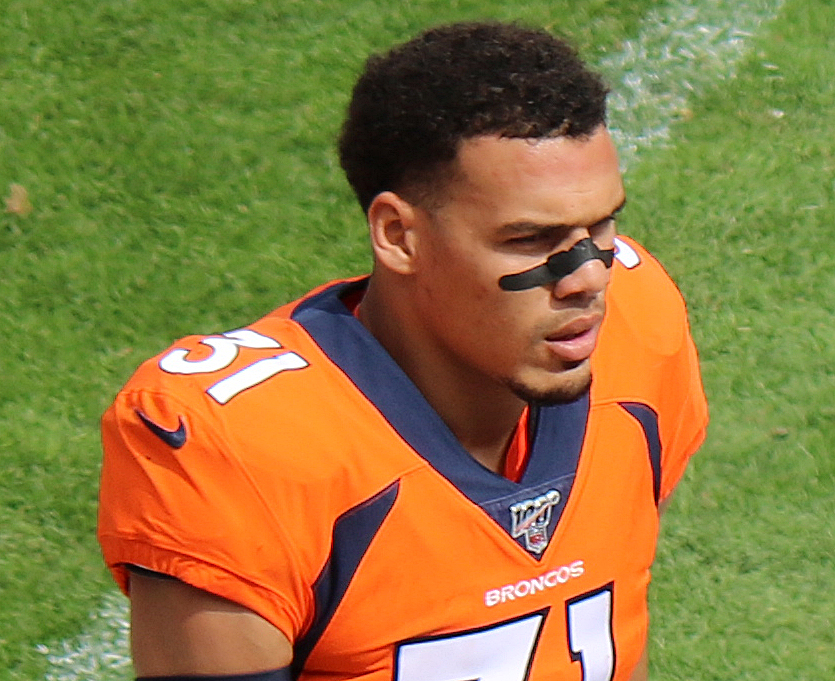
Simmons in 2019

On January 10, 2019, the Denver Broncos hired Chicago Bears' defensive coordinator Vic Fangio as head coach. Fangio was a part of former Denver Broncos' head coach John Fox's staff in Chicago, as well as the new defensive coordinator Ed Donatell. Vic Fangio elected to retain Simmons as the starting free safety to begin the season, along with Kareem Jackson at strong safety.

In Week 2, he collected a season-high nine combined tackles (eight solo) and deflected two passes during a 14–16 loss to the Chicago Bears. On October 13, 2019, Simmons made four solo tackles, a pass deflection, and had an interception off of Marcus Mariota to mark his second consecutive game with an interception as the Broncos defeated the Tennessee Titans 16–0. In Week 14, Simmons recorded six combined tackles (two solo) and a season-high three pass deflections in a 38–24 victory at the Houston Texans. He completed the season with a total of 93 combined tackles (65 solo), 15 pass deflections, and four interceptions while starting all 16 games. He was the highest-graded safety in the NFL in 2019 with an overall grade of 90.8 from Pro Football Focus. He played every single defensive snap for the second consecutive season and was elected as a second-team All-Pro.

==== 2020 ====
On March 13, 2020, the Denver Broncos placed the franchise tag on Simmons. On July 14, 2020, he signed the one-year tender worth $11.441 million on.

On September 20, 2020, Simmons led the team with eight combined tackles (seven solo) and had a season-high two pass deflections while also making his first interception of the season thrown by Ben Roethlisberger during the 26–21 loss at the Pittsburgh Steelers. In Week 10, he racked up a season-high nine combined tackles (five solo) as the Broncos lost 12-37 at the Las Vegas Raiders. The following week, with the Dolphins driving and trailing 20–13, Simmons intercepted a pass thrown by quarterback Ryan Fitzpatrick in the end zone with 1:05 left, halting the Dolphins comeback attempt and sealing a Broncos victory. On December 21, 2020, Simmons was voted to the 2021 Pro Bowl. On January 3, 2021, Simmons produced three combined tackles (two solo), tied a season-high with two pass deflections, and set a career-high by recording his fifth interception of the season off a pass thrown by Derek Carr during the 32–31 loss against the Las Vegas Raiders. He started in every game for the third consecutive season in 2020 and finished with a total of 96 combined tackles (77 solo), nine pass deflections, and a career-high five interceptions. His performance in 2020 earned his a spot as the 45th best player voted among by his peers in the NFL Top 100 Players of 2021.

==== 2021 ====
On March 5, 2021, the Denver Broncos placed the franchise tag on Simmons for a second consecutive season, offering a one-year, $13.73 million contract. On March 19, 2021, the Denver Broncos and Simmons agreed upon a four-year, $61.00 million contract extension with the team that included $35.00 million guaranteed with $32.10 million guaranteed upon signing and an initial signing bonus of $15.00 million.

Defensive coordinator Ed Donatell retained Simmons and Kareem Jackson as the starting safeties to begin the season. On October 31, 2021, Simmons recorded seven solo tackles, two pass deflections, and set a career-high with two interceptions from passes thrown by Taylor Heinicke during a 17–10 win against the Washington Football Team. In Week 12, he collected a season-high eight combined tackles (seven solo) and deflected two passes in the Broncos' 28–13 win over the Los Angeles Chargers. He started all 17 regular season games and produced 80 combined tackles (60 solo), 12 pass deflections, five interceptions, and 1.5 sacks. His performance earned his a spot as the 81st best player in the NFL Top 100 Players of 2022.

==== 2022 ====
On January 9, 2022, the Denver Broncos fired head coach Vic Fangio after finishing with a 7–10 record in 2021. On January 27, 2022, the Denver Broncos hired Green Bay Packers' offensive coordinator Nathaniel Hackett as their head coach. Simmons and Kareem Jackson returned as the starting safety tandem under defensive coordinator Ejiro Evero.

In Week 1, Simmons recorded nine combined tackles (two solo) before suffering a quad injury as the Broncos lost 16–17 at the Seattle Seahawks On September 14, 2022, the Denver Broncos officially placed Simmons on injured reserve due to his quad injury and he would miss the next four games (Weeks 2–5). On October 17, 2022, he was activated from injured reserve. On December 4, 2022, Simmons made five combined tackles (four solo), two pass deflections, a forced fumble, and intercepted two passes by Tyler Huntley in a 9–10 loss at the Baltimore Ravens. In Week 15, he had four combined tackles (two solo) and two interceptions from passes thrown by Colt McCoy and Trace McSorley as the Broncos defeated the Arizona Cardinals 24–15. On December 26, 2022, the Denver Broncos fired head coach Nathaniel Hackett following a 4–11 record. On January 1, 2023, he recorded a solo tackle, a pass deflection, and set a career-high with his sixth interception of the season after picking off Patrick Mahomes during a 24–27 loss at the Kansas City Chiefs. The following week, he collected a season-high ten combined tackles (seven solo) in a 31–28 win over the Los Angeles Chargers in Week 18. He ended the 2022 NFL season with 69 combined tackles (42 solo), seven pass deflections, six interceptions, and a forced fumble in 12 games with 12 starts. He finished the season with an overall grade of 73.2 from Pro Football Focus. He ranked 58th in the NFL Top 100 Players of 2023.

==== 2023 ====
On February 2, 2023, the Denver Broncos announced the hiring of former New Orleans Saints' head coach Sean Payton as their third head coach in as many seasons. Defensive coordinator Vance Joseph retained the duo of Simmons and Kareem Jackson as the starting safeties. In Week 2, Simmons racked up a season-high ten combined tackles (seven solo) in the Broncos' 33–35 loss against the Washington Commanders. Simmons was inactive for the next two games (Weeks 3–4) after injuring his hip. In Week 8, Simmons played a large role in the Broncos ending their 16-game losing streak to the Kansas City Chiefs, recording two tackles, a fumble recovery, and a fourth-quarter interception in a 24–9 victory. He was named AFC Defensive Player of the Week for his performance. It was the first time in his eight-year career that the Broncos beat the Chiefs. In Week 11, he had four combined tackles (three solo) and tied a career-high with three pass deflections during a 21–20 victory over the Minnesota Vikings. He recorded 70 combined tackles (53 solo), eight pass deflections, three interceptions, one sack, two forced fumbles, and a fumble recovery in 15 games and 15 starts in 2023. He was voted to the 2024 Pro Bowl and was a second-team All-Pro for the third consecutive season. He finished the season with an overall grade of 57.7 from Pro Football Focus. He was voted 57th by his peers on the NFL Top 100 Players of 2024.

On March 7, 2024, the Denver Broncos released Simmons after eight seasons in order to save $14.5 million.

=== Atlanta Falcons ===
On August 15, 2024, the Atlanta Falcons signed Simmons to a one–year, $7.50 million contract that was fully guaranteed upon signing and also included a signing bonus of $4.75 million.

Although Simmons was signed towards the end of training camp, he competed for a role as a starting safety against Richie Grant and DeMarcco Hellams. Defensive coordinator Jimmy Lake chose Simmons to be the starting strong safety to start the regular season, alongside free safety Jessie Bates. In Week 3, he tied his season-high of six combined tackles (two solo), made a pass deflection, and intercepted a pass thrown by Patrick Mahomes during a 17–22 loss to the Kansas City Chiefs. On December 16, 2024, Simmons had a season-high two pass deflections and intercepted a pass thrown by Desmond Ridder intended for wide receiver Jakobi Meyers in the Falcons' 15–9 victory at the Las Vegas Raiders. He finished the 2024 NFL season with 62 combined tackles (36 solo), seven pass deflections, and two interceptions in 16 games and 16 starts. He received an overall grade of 59.9 from Pro Football Focus, which ranked 69th among 97 qualifying safeties in 2024.

=== Retirement ===
On April 29, 2026, Simmons signed a one-day contract to retire with the Denver Broncos.

== NFL career statistics ==
Legend
	Led the league
**Bold**	Career high

Year	Team	Games		Tackles				Fumbles			Interceptions					
Year	Team	GP	GS	Cmb	Solo	Ast	Sck	FF	FR	Yds	Int	Yds	Avg	Lng	TD	PD
2016	DEN	13	3	30	25	5	1.0	0	0	0	2	83	**41.5**	45	0	4
2017	DEN	13	13	69	50	19	1.0	0	0	0	2	65	32.5	**65T**	**1**	5
2018	DEN	16	16	**97**	71	26	0.0	0	0	0	3	8	2.7	8	0	4
2019	DEN	16	16	93	65	**28**	0.0	0	0	0	4	30	7.5	17	0	**15**
2020	DEN	16	16	96	**77**	19	0.0	0	**1**	**18**	5	**90**	18.0	46	0	9
2021	DEN	**17**	**17**	80	60	20	**1.5**	0	0	0	5	76	15.2	35	0	12
2022	DEN	12	12	69	42	27	0.0	**3**	**1**	17	**6**	51	8.5	23	0	7
2023	DEN	15	15	70	53	17	1.0	2	**1**	7	3	39	13.0	33	0	8
2024	ATL	16	16	62	36	26	0.0	0	0	0	2	0	0.0	0	0	7
Career		134	124	666	479	187	4.5	5	3	42	32	442	13.8	65T	1	71

== Personal life ==
Simmons was born to Victor and Kimberly Simmons in 1993. His father is black and his mother is white. Simmons has two younger brothers, Nate and Tristan.

Simmons married his high school sweetheart Taryn Richard in 2016. They have three children: Laney, Shae, and Kyler. Simmons frequently describes himself as a devout Christian.

During the summer of 2009, Simmons played in the USSSA U15 Florida state basketball championship game in Gainesville against the Jupiter Jaguars, a team that featured Tyler Cameron, future football player at Wake Forest and Florida Atlantic and member of season 15 of ABC's The Bachelorette as well as Kedric Bostic, future Quarterback at Princeton University, among others.
