= 156th Airlift Squadron =

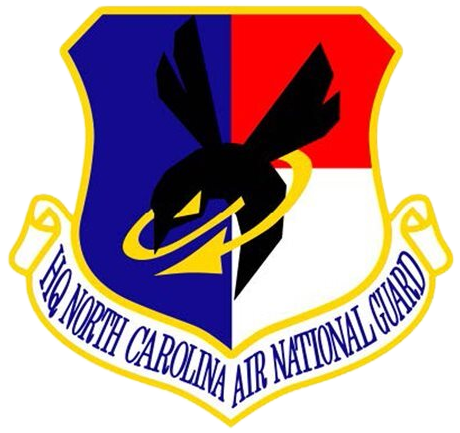
156th Airlift Squadron

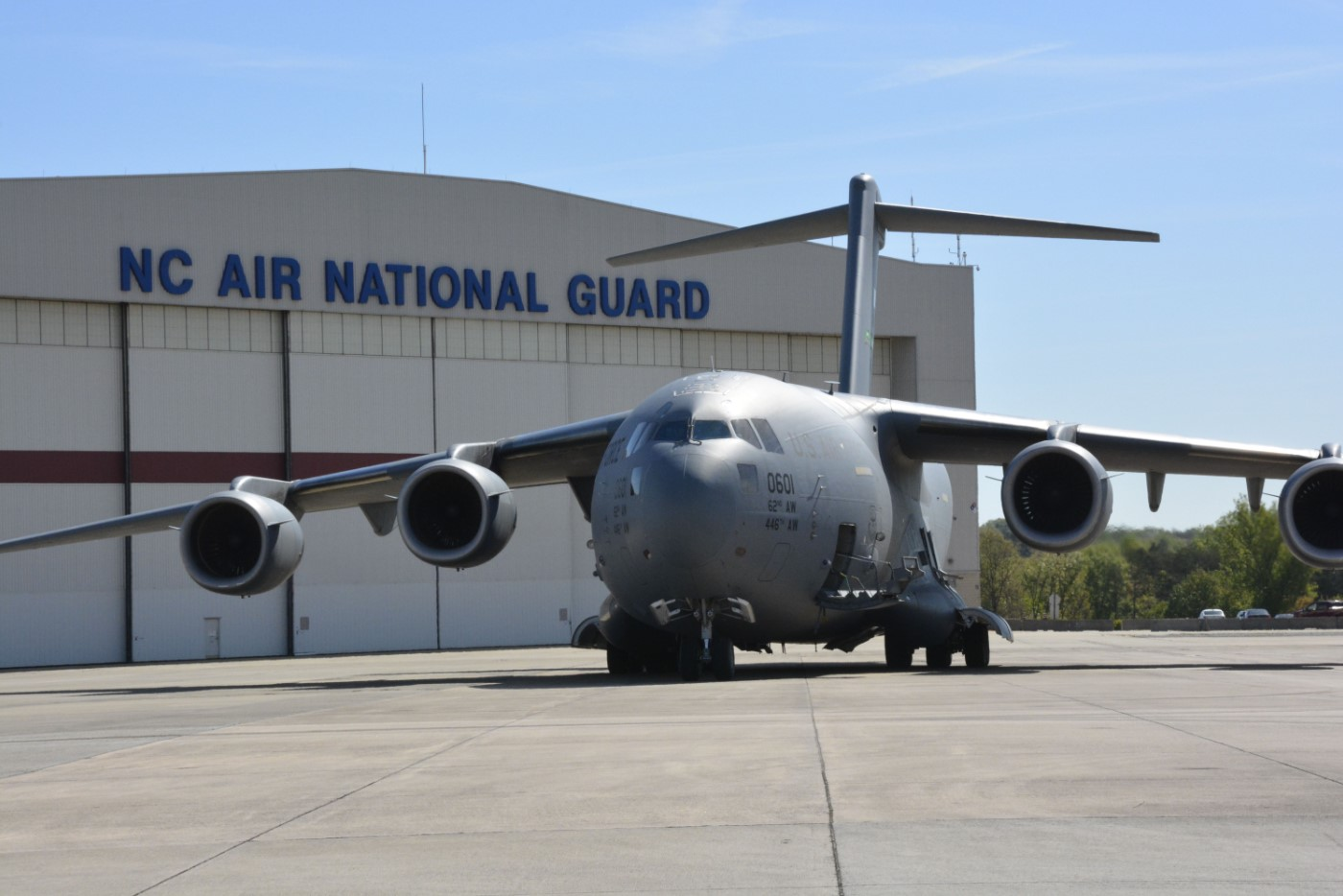
- A Boeing C-17 Globemaster III from the 156th Airlift Squadron on the ramp of the Charlotte Air National Guard Base
- Active: 1942–1945; 1948–1952; 1953–1971; 1971–present
- Country: United States
- Allegiance: North Carolina
- Branch: Air National Guard
- Type: Squadron
- Role: Airlift
- Part of: North Carolina Air National Guard
- Garrison/HQ: Charlotte Air National Guard Base, North Carolina
- Decorations: Distinguished Unit Citation

Insignia
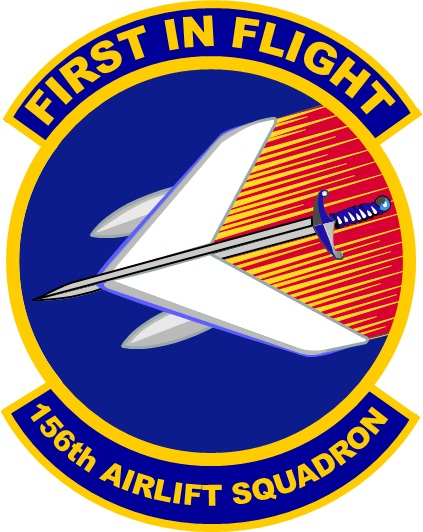
- 156th Airlift Squadron emblem

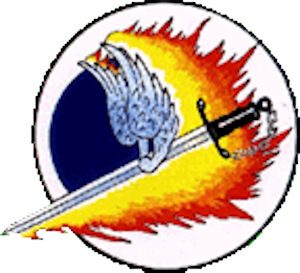
- 360th Fighter Squadron emblem
- Tail stripe: Winged sword on red leading edge, blue with "Charlotte" in yellow letters

The 156th Airlift Squadron is a unit of the North Carolina Air National Guard 145th Airlift Wing. It is assigned to Charlotte Air National Guard Base, North Carolina and is equipped with the Boeing C-17 Globemaster III aircraft.

== History ==
=== World War II ===
Organized and trained in the Northeast United States by First Air Force. During training was part of the air defense of the northeast, being attached to the New York and Boston Fighter Wings.

Deployed to England aboard the RMS Queen Elizabeth and served in combat as part of VIII Fighter Command from October 1943 to May 1945, participating in operations that prepared for the invasion of the Continent, and supporting the landings in Normandy and the subsequent Allied drive across France and Germany. The squadron flew P-47 Thunderbolts until they were replaced by P-51 Mustangs in November 1944.

From October 1943 until January 1944, operated as escort for B-17 Flying Fortress/B-24 Liberator bombers that attacked such objectives as industrial areas, missile sites, airfields, and communications.

Fighters from the 461st engaged primarily in bombing and strafing missions after 3 January 1944, with its targets including U-boat installations, barges, shipyards, aerodromes, hangars, marshalling yards, locomotives, trucks, oil facilities, flak towers, and radar stations. Bombed and strafed in the Arnhem, Netherlands area on 17, 18, and 23 September 1944 to neutralize enemy gun emplacements providing support to Allied ground forces during Operation Market-Garden. In early 1945, the squadron's P-51 Mustangs clashed with German Me 262 jet aircraft. The squadron flew its last combat mission, escorting B-17's dropping propaganda leaflets, on 7 May 1945.

Remained in the United Kingdom during the balance of 1945, most personnel were demobilized and returned to the United States, with aircraft being sent to storage facilities in the UK. The squadron was administratively inactivated at Camp Kilmer New Jersey on 10 November 1945 without personnel or equipment.

=== North Carolina Air National Guard ===
The unit designation was transferred to the North Carolina Air National Guard in May 1946, being re-designated as the 156th Fighter Squadron. It was organized at Morris Field, near Charlotte, a former Third Air Force Army Airfield during World War II. Equipped with F-47D Thunderbolts, it was activated on 15 March 1948 by the NC Air National Guard, its gaining organization being Fourteenth Air Force, Continental Air Command.

The 156th performed normal peacetime training operations, was re-equipped with F-51 Mustangs in 1949. As a result of the Korean War, the squadron was federalized and placed on active duty, 10 October 1950. Assigned to Strategic Air Command, it was assigned to the Kentucky ANG 123d Fighter-Bomber Wing. After a training period at Godman AFB with F-84E Thunderjets, the wing was deployed to RAF Manston, England where it replaced the 12th Fighter-Escort Wing which had been returned to the United States. In England, the unit provided fighter escorts for SAC's rotational B-50 Superfortress bombardment wings which operated from several USAF-controlled bases in the UK. In July 1952 the squadron returned to the United States and was returned to state control, leaving its aircraft and equipment in England.

Upon return to Charlotte, the 156th returned to operating propeller-driven F-51 Mustangs, operating them until their retirement in 1955, being operationally gained by Tactical Air Command. Was transferred to Air Defense Command (ADC) in mid-1955, and re-equipped with F-86A Sabre day interceptors. The squadron was given an air defense mission over North and South Carolina as part of the ADC 35th Air Division, Dobbins Air Force Base, Georgia. In July 1957, the squadron was expanded to a group-level, with the establishment of the 145th Fighter Group. The 156th was assigned as a subordinate unit to the new group. In 1959 was upgraded to the day/night/all-weather F-86L Sabre Interceptor.

In February 1961, was reassigned to the Military Air Transport Service Eastern Transport Air Force (EASTAF), at McGuire AFB, New Jersey. Was re-designated as the 156th Aeromedical Transport Squadron. Equipped with C-119 Flying Boxcars equipped for medical transport, the squadron performed evacuations of transport of critically ill military personnel (and dependents) to military medical facilities for treatment. Re-equipped with C-121 Constellations in 1964, performed passenger transport missions for MATS both domestically and to the Caribbean and Europe for EASTAF. Was transferred to the new Military Airlift Command Twenty-First Air Force when MATS was reorganized in 1966.

Was transferred back to Tactical Air Command control in 1971, being equipped with early-model C-130B Hercules tactical airlifters, being given a theater airlift and troop carrier mission as part of Ninth Air Force. Celebrated 25 years of service in 1973, winning 1st place in worldwide airlift competition.

In January 1974, transferred to Military Airlift Command, Twenty-First Air Force, later that year assisted in rescue of 10 lives of the Eastern Air Lines Flight 212 crash at Charlotte on 11 September. In 1985, the units mission was expanded by the addition of the Modular Airborne FireFighting System (MAFFS) capability added to the C-130s for aerial firefighting. Other awards won were the 1986 Volant Rodeo competition as world's best airlift crew and plane and 1987 Spaatz Trophy for best flying unit in the Air National Guard.

During the 1991 Persian Gulf Conflict, the squadron's 56th Aeromedical Evacuation Flight was activated and deployed to Saudi Arabia, participating in Operation Desert Storm. The squadron also achieved 150,000 hours of safe flying.

Was reassigned to Air Mobility Command in 1992. and helped evacuate hospital patients in South Florida after Hurricane Andrew in late August. Upgraded to C-130H Hercules in 1993.

Celebrated 50th anniversary in 1998, received an Excellent" on Operational Readiness Inspection (ORI), and achieved 176,879 accident free flying hours. After Hurricane Floyd in 1999, the squadron flew 33,000 cases of food rations in 3 C-130s to flood victims and erected a tent city for 80 people near Wilmington's airport. Additional hurricane relief took place in 2005 when the 196th was the first airlift squadron on site in response to Hurricane Katrina Relief support.

In July 2012, four members of the squadron died as their C-130 firefighting plane crashed during firefighting efforts in South Dakota. They were: Lt. Col. Paul K. Mikeal, 42, and Maj. Joseph M. McCormick, 36, both pilots; Maj. Ryan S. David, 35, a navigator; and Senior Master Sgt. Robert S. Cannon, 50, a flight engineer.

The squadron began switching to the C-17A Globemaster III aircraft in the fourth quarter of 2017.

== Lineage ==
156th Military Airlift Squadron

- Constituted as the 360th Fighter Squadron on 8 December 1942

Activated on 12 December 1942
Inactivated on 11 November 1945
Redesignated 156th Fighter Squadron and allotted to the National Guard on 24 May 1946
Organized on 21 August 1947
Extended federal recognition on 15 March 1948
Federalized and placed on active duty on 10 October 1950
Redesignated 156th Fighter-Bomber Squadron on 27 October 1950
Released from active duty, returned to North Carolina state control and redesignated 156th Fighter-Interceptor Squadron on 10 July 1952
Redesignated 156th Fighter-Bomber Squadron on 1 December 1952
Redesignated 156th Fighter-Interceptor Squadron on 1 July 1955
Redesignated 156th Aeromedical Transport Squadron, Light on 1 January 1961
Redesignated 156th Air Transport Squadron, Heavy on 25 January 1964
Redesignated 156th Military Airlift Squadron on 1 January 1966
Inactivated on 14 May 1971
Consolidated with the 156th Tactical Airlift Squadron on 18 August 1987

156th Airlift Squadron

- Constituted as the 156th Tactical Airlift Squadron and allotted to the Air National Guard

Activated on 15 May 1971
Consolidated with the 156th Military Airlift Squadron on 18 August 1987
Redesignated 156th Airlift Squadron on 15 March 1992

=== Assignments ===
- 356th Fighter Group, 12 December 1942 – 11 November 1945
- 54th Fighter Wing, 15 March 1948
- 123d Fighter Group, 1948
- Fourteenth Air Force, 10 October 1950
- 123d Fighter-Bomber Group, October 1950 – 10 July 1952
- 123d Fighter-Bomber Group (later 123d Fighter-Bomber Group), 10 July 1952
- 145th Fighter Group, (later 145th Aeromedical Transport Group, 145th Air Transport Group, 145th Military Airlift Group), 1 July 1957 – 14 May 1971
- 145th Tactical Airlift Group (later 145th Airlift Group), 15 May 1971
- 145th Operations Group, 1 October 1995 – present

=== Stations ===
- Westover Field, Massachusetts, 12 December 1942
- Groton Army Air Field, Connecticut, 9 March 1943
- Grenier Field, New Hampshire, 6 Jul-15 Aug 1943
- RAF Goxhill (AAF-345), England, 26 August 1943
- RAF Martlesham Heath (AAF-369), England, c. 10 Oct 1943 – 27 Oct 1945
- Camp Kilmer, New Jersey, 10–11 Nov 1945
- Morris Field, North Carolina, 15 March 1948
- Godman Air Force Base, Kentucky, 20 October 1950
- RAF Manston, England, November 1951 – 10 Jul 1952
- Douglas IAP (later Charlotte Air National Guard Base), North Carolina, 10 July 1952 – present

=== Aircraft ===
- P-47 Thunderbolt, 1943–1944
- P-51 Mustang, 1944–1945
- F-47D Thunderbolt, 1948–1949
- F-51D Mustang, 1949–1950; 1952–1955
- F-84 Thunderjet, 1950–1952
- F-86A Sabre, 1955–1957
- F-86E Sabre, 1957–1959
- F-86L Sabre Interceptor, 1959–1961
- C-119C Flying Boxcar, 1961–1962
- C-121 Constellation, 1962–1971
- C-130 Hercules, 1971–2017
- C-17 Globemaster III, 2018–present

== Notes ==
=== Bibliography ===
- Maurer, Maurer, ed. (1982) [1969]. Combat Squadrons of the Air Force, World War II (PDF) (reprint ed.). Washington, DC: Office of Air Force History. ISBN 0-405-12194-6. LCCN 70605402. OCLC 72556. Archived from the original (PDF) on 20 December 2016.
