= Martin County High School =

Public high school in Stuart, Florida

- "County"
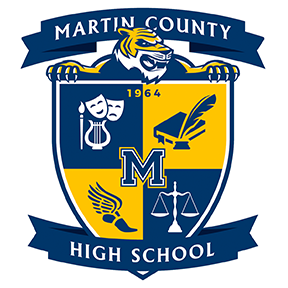

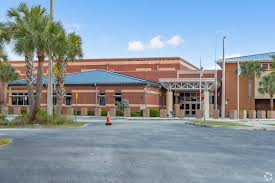

Location
- 2801 South Kanner Highway; Stuart, Florida 34994; United States

Information
- Type: Public high school
- Motto: Every student will graduate college and career capable.
- Established: 1964
- Locale: Suburban
- School district: Martin County School District
- Principal: Lori Vogel
- Staff: 102
- Grades: 9-12
- Enrollment: 2,055 (2024-25)
  - Grade 9: 548
  - Grade 10: 488
  - Grade 11: 516
  - Grade 12: 503
- Hours in school day: 8:30 - 3:15
- Colors: Blue and gold
- Mascot: Tiger
- Yearbook: MACOSH
- Website: Official website

Martin County High School is a secondary school in Stuart, Florida, United States, operated by the Martin County School District.. The school enrolls 2,055 total students across 4 grade levels. In 2024, it was a "B" rated school through the Florida Department of Education.

== School structure ==
In 2025, enrollment was 2,055 students in grades 9 through 12. The student body is 57% White, 33% Hispanic, 6% Black, 2% Asian American, and 2% Other. 36% of students are considered "Economically Disadvantaged". There are 102 teachers employed at MCHS.

== Curriculum ==
Martin County High School participates in the Cambridge Advanced International Certificate of Education (AICE) program and offers multiple Advanced Placement (AP) courses. Students may also participate in dual enrollment through Indian River State College, earning both high school and college credit concurrently.

=== Career and technical education ===
Martin County High School offers several state-approved career and technical education (CTE) programs, including:

- Automotive and industrial technology
- Computer science
- Culinary arts
- Criminal justice
- Digital media and photography
- Medical and allied health sciences
- Sports, recreation, and entertainment marketing
- Welding technology

Martin County was named Small District of the Year by Cambridge International Education. The school has an 80% pass rate for the Cambridge program.

== Extracurricular activities ==
Martin County High School in Stuart, Florida, offers a range of sports and clubs. The sports teams include football, bowling, swimming and diving, basketball, soccer, tennis, golf, cross country, track and field, and wrestling. Students can participate in academic and leadership clubs like the National Honor Society, Key Club, and Student Government Association.

=== FL-937 AFJROTC Program ===
The school also features an Air Force Junior Reserve Officer Training program with activities such as Aviation Club, Color Guard, Drill Team, and Kitty Hawk Air Society. Since its founding in 1993, the FL-937 program has been dedicated to fulfilling the core mission of AFJROTC: to 'Develop citizens of character.' It has accumulated awards, most recently "Distinguished Unit Award".

== Notable alumni ==
- Dan Bakkedahl – actor and comedian
- Kelly Carrington (Kelly Hemberger) – Playboy Playmate October 2008
- Amanda Cerny – Playboy Playmate October 2011
- Paul Denino – YouTuber and live streamer
- Derek Fathauer – American professional golfer
- Forest K. Ferguson – U.S. Army officer and recipient of the Distinguished Service Cross
- Kevin Kelly – professional wrestling commentator
- Omar Mateen – Islamic terrorist and mass murderer who perpetrated the Pulse Orlando nightclub shooting
- Scott Proctor – Major League Baseball pitcher
- Judge Reinhold – actor,
- Ken Russell - Miami City Commissioner
- Justin Simmons – American football player for the Denver Broncos
- Scott Thuman – television journalist
