= Stanly County Airport =

Airport in North Carolina, United States

Stanly County Airport

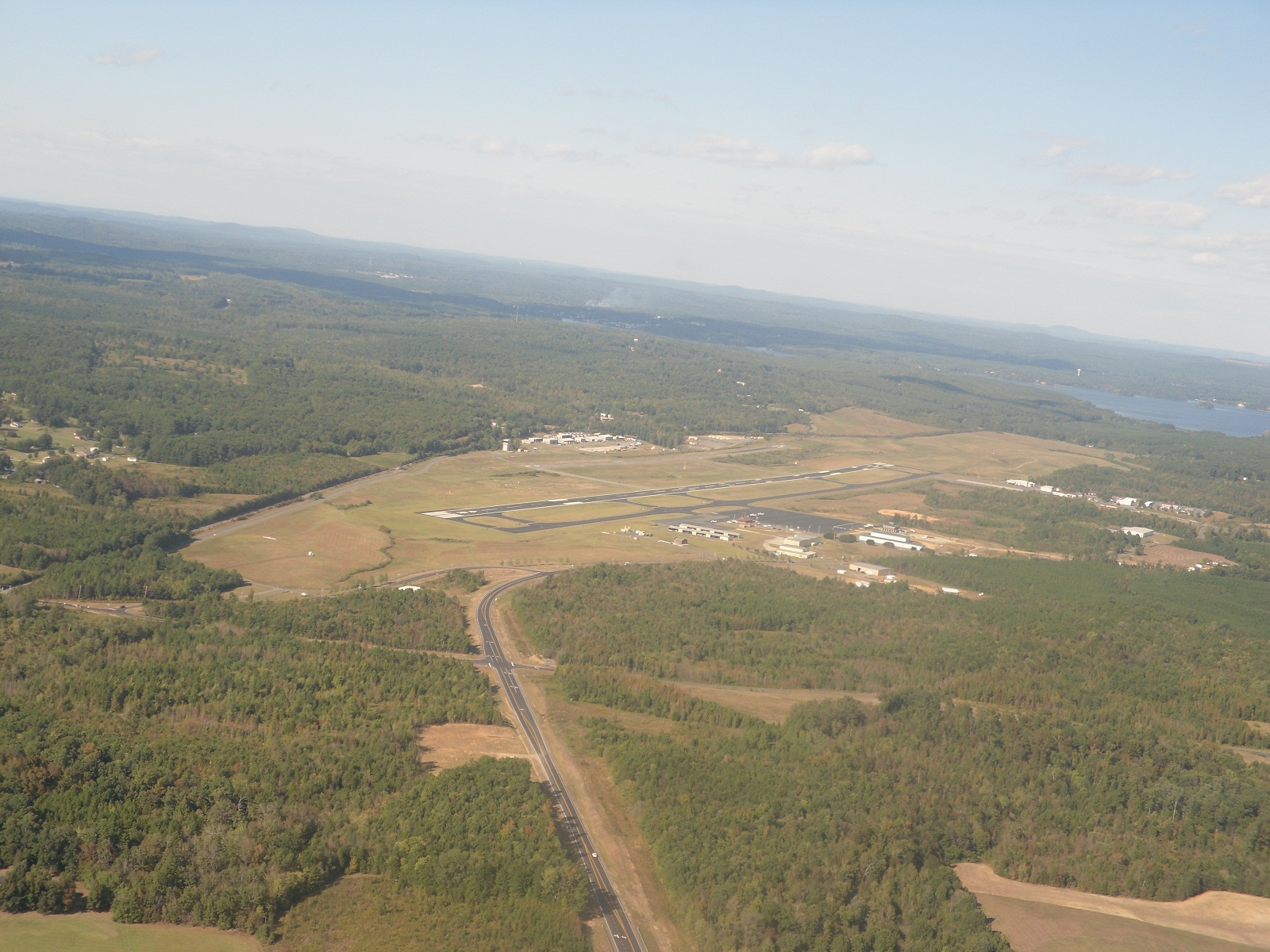
- IATA: none; ICAO: KVUJ; FAA LID: VUJ

Summary
- Airport type: Public
- Owner: Stanly County
- Serves: Albemarle, North Carolina
- Elevation AMSL: 609 ft / 186 m
- Coordinates: 35°25′00″N 080°09′03″W
- Website: StanlyCountyAirport.com

Map
- Location of airport in North Carolina

Runways
Direction	Length		Surface
Direction	ft	m	Surface
4R/22L	5,499	1,676	Asphalt
4L/22R	3,501	1,067	Asphalt

Statistics (2023)
- Aircraft operations (year ending 5/29/2023): 28,068
- Based aircraft: 43
- Source: Federal Aviation Administration

Stanly County Airport (ICAO: KVUJ, FAA LID: VUJ) is a county-owned, joint civil-military, public-use airport in Stanly County, North Carolina, United States. It is located four nautical miles (5 mi, 7 km) northeast of the central business district of Albemarle, North Carolina. This airport is included in the National Plan of Integrated Airport Systems for 2011–2015, which categorized it as a general aviation facility.

Although most U.S. airports use the same three-letter location identifier for the FAA and IATA, this airport is assigned VUJ by the FAA but has no assignment from the IATA. The airport's ICAO identifier is KVUJ.

== Stanly County Air National Guard Station ==
Stanly County Airport serves as a regional training site for the North Carolina Air National Guard. The 235th Air Traffic Control Squadron (235 ATCS) operates the control tower at the airport. Also located at the airport's Air National Guard Station are the 118th Air Support Operations Squadron (118 ASOS), 156th Weather Flight (156 WF) and the 263d Combat Communications Squadron (263 CCS). Runway 4R/22L was frequently used as an assault strip by the C-130s of the North Carolina Air National Guard's 145th Airlift Wing (145 AW) based in Charlotte; that unit is now transitioning to the C-17 Globemaster III.

== Facilities and aircraft ==
Stanly County Airport covers an area of 800 acres (324 ha) at an elevation of 609 feet (186 m) above mean sea level. It has two runways with asphalt surfaces:4R/22L is 5,499 by 100 feet (1,676 x 30 m) and 4L/22R is 3,501 by 75 feet (1,067 x 23 m).

For the 12-month period ending May 29, 2023, the airport had 28,068 aircraft operations, an average of 77 per day: 63% general aviation and 38% military. At that time there were 43 aircraft based at this airport: 37 single-engine and 6 multi-engine.

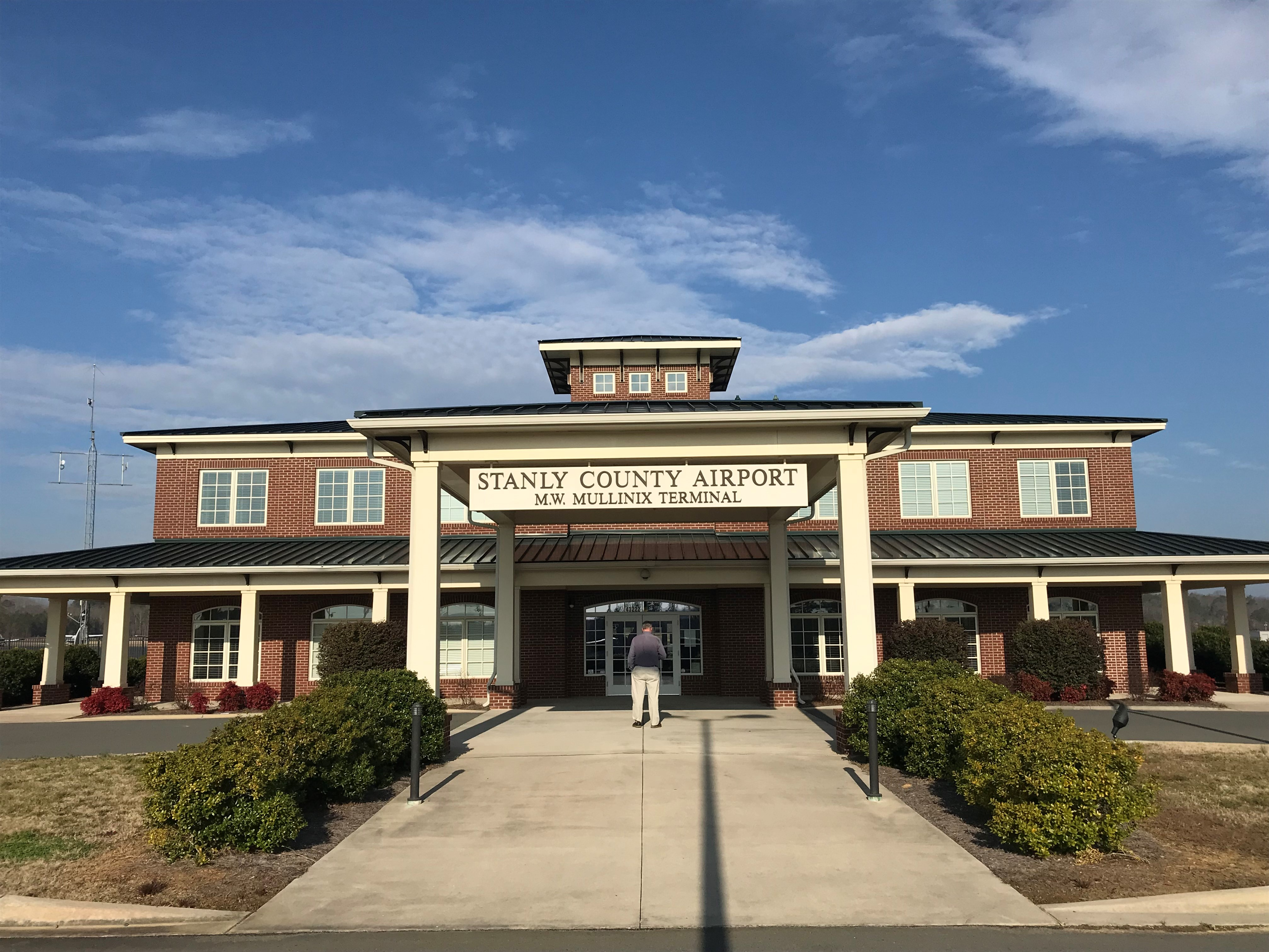
Stanly County Airport Albemarle NC front of building

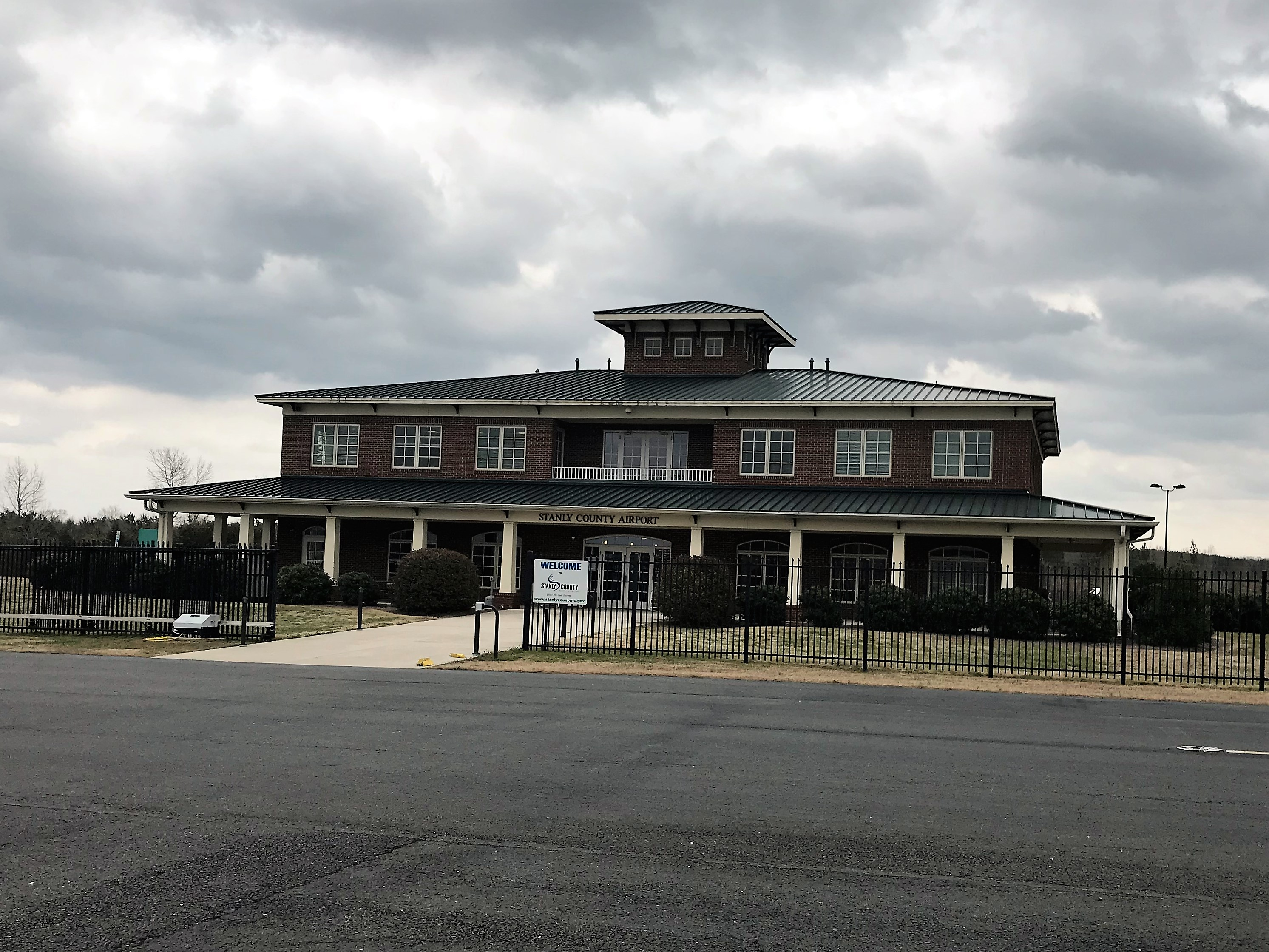
Stanly County Airport from the tarmac

== See also ==
- List of airports in North Carolina
