= List of St. Thomas University (Florida) alumni =

This list of St. Thomas University alumni includes graduates, non-graduate former students and current students of St. Thomas University in Miami Gardens, Florida.

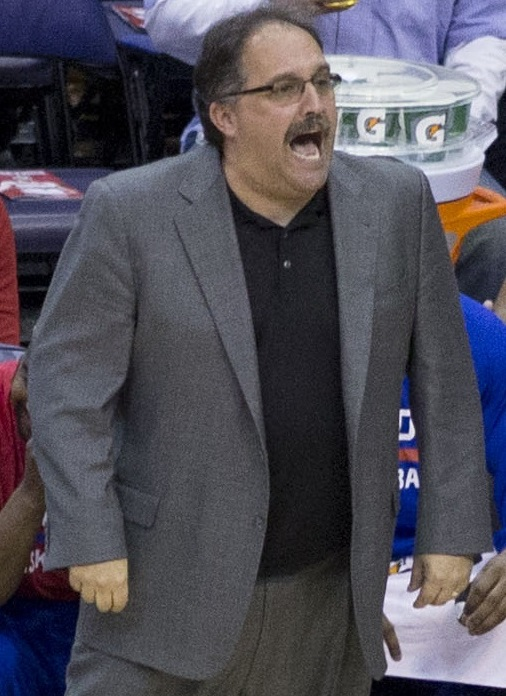
Stan Van Gundy

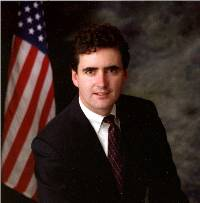
Mike Fitzpatrick

Alumni	Notability
Kiko Calero	Major League Baseball (MLB) relief pitcher for the Florida Marlins
Vinnie Chulk	MLB relief pitcher for the San Francisco Giants
Ivette Corredero	Runner–up in CBS TV series Big Brother 6; first recipient of the Susan E. Sachs Scholarship by the Atlantic-Florida chapter of the Association for Women in Communications, given to top communications students
Francis Farberoff	B.A. 1997; former player and head coach of the men's U.S. Beach Soccer National Team and current head coach of the Bahamas Beach Soccer National Team
Mike Fitzpatrick	U.S. congressman from Pennsylvania
Leopold Frade	Bishop of the Episcopal Diocese of Southeast Florida and former bishop of Honduras
Dom Irrera	Actor and stand-up comic
Paul Mainieri	Head baseball coach of the LSU Tigers baseball team
Alex Penelas	Former mayor of Miami-Dade County, Florida
Juan-Carlos Planas	University Law School graduate; current member of the Florida House of Representatives
Stan Van Gundy	Former Miami Heat head coach; current head coach of the Orlando Magic and head of the committee to start a college basketball program at St. Thomas University
Connie Yori	Earned a master's degree at St. Thomas; head coach of the Nebraska Cornhuskers women's basketball team and 2010 recipient of the Naismith College Coach of the Year award
