= Clarence Ervin =

American military officer and administrator

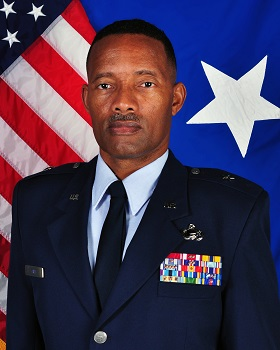
- Born: South Carolina
- Military career
- Service years: 1979–2019
- Rank: Brigadier general
- Awards: Legion of Merit

Clarence Ervin is an American military officer and health administrator who was formerly chief of staff of the North Carolina Air National Guard and assistant chief for Acute and Home Care Licensure of the North Carolina Department of Health and Human Services.

== Early life and education ==
Clarence Ervin was born in South Carolina and enlisted in the United States Air Force in 1979. He ended his active duty service in 1983 and enlisted in the North Carolina Air National Guard in 1985.

Ervin received a Bachelor of Arts degree from Saint Leo University in 1983 and a Master of Health Administration from Pfeiffer University in 2003.

== Career ==
=== Military ===
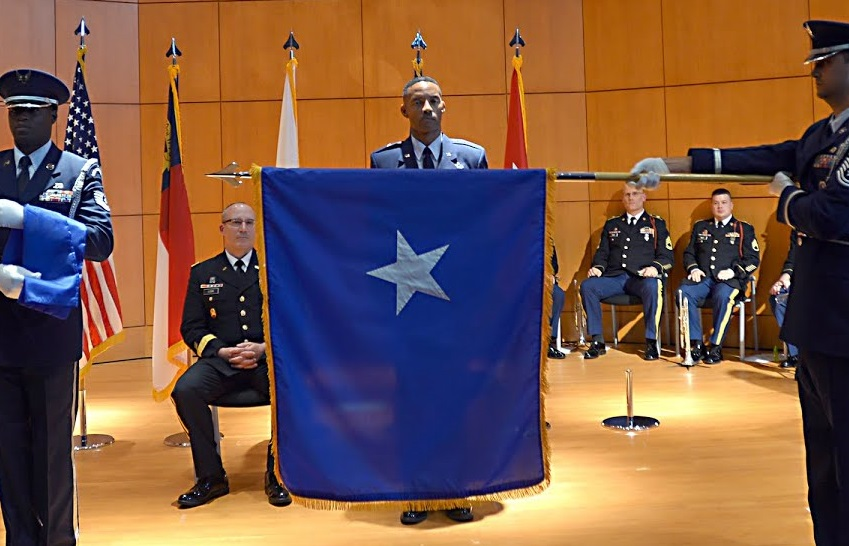
Clarence Ervin is presented his position standard upon promotion to brigadier general in 2015

Ervin was commissioned an officer in the North Carolina Air National Guard in 1988. During his service in the Air National Guard, he was commander of the 145th Services Flight, the 145th Mission Support Group, and was vice commander of the 145th Airlift Wing. He was deployed as part of Operation Noble Eagle, Operation Iraqi Freedom, and Operation Jump Start, and was the 2014 recipient of the Major General I.G. Brown Command Excellence Award.

On December 18, 2015, Ervin was promoted to brigadier general and appointed chief of staff of the North Carolina Air National Guard, becoming the first African-American brigadier general in the history of the North Carolina Air National Guard. He retired in 2019.

=== Civilian ===
Commensurate with his service in the North Carolina Air National Guard, Ervin was employed by the North Carolina Department of Health and Human Services and, by 2016, was assistant chief for Acute and Home Care Licensure and Certification.

== Personal life ==
Ervin was widowed from his wife, with whom he had two sons, in 2016.
