= Scott Thuman =

Scott Thuman is the Chief Political Correspondent for the Sinclair Broadcast Group. He reports nightly on the White House, Capitol Hill and international affairs including terrorism and military action. Additionally, Thuman is a primary correspondent for the Sunday morning national news program, Full Measure with Sharyl Attkisson. He has filed reports for the show from across the globe including war zones and from five continents.

Thuman returned to his political reporting position in 2013 after two separate stints as co-anchor of "Good Morning Washington" and ABC7 "News at Noon:, where he was also reporter for nine years at WJLA.

== Early life ==
Thuman was born in the Washington, DC area and grew up in South Florida. He attended Martin County High School in Stuart, Florida and Florida Southern College in Lakeland, where he majored in Communications and minored in Spanish. He is a graduate of the F.B.I. Citizens' Academy at their Washington Field Office.

== Career ==
Scott Thuman is currently the Chief Political Correspondent for the Sinclair Broadcast Group and first gained attention as a political reporter while previously working for WJLA-ABC7 News in Washington, D.C. During the 2012 presidential campaign, Thuman was the only local television reporter in Washington to land multiple interviews with President Obama. It was during one of these interviews that Mr. Obama made his first extensive and critical comments of Mitt Romney and his time at Bain Capital. Thuman conducted another exclusive one-on-one with President Obama on election day. Earlier in the 2012 campaign, he anchored POLITICO TV on C-SPAN. Thuman was also credited with developing new leads in the Herman Cain sex-scandal stories and was on the receiving end of Cain's now-infamous "Excuse me!" rant. In 2013, his work was extensively featured in WJLA's composite entry which won the USC Annenberg Walter Cronkite award for excellence in television political journalism. Thuman took on a national role when WJLA was purchased by Sinclair. Thuman has since conducted multiple presidential interviews including President Trump. His coverage of politics in Washington DC and globally has earned him more than a dozen regional Emmy Awards. His extensive overseas work for the weekly show, ‘Full Measure’ with Sharyl Attkisson has garnered further accolades for reports filed in Ukraine, Russia, Vietnam, Tunisia, Lebanon, Israel, and across Europe, South & Central America. Thuman also appears daily on The National Desk as a contributing correspondent and anchor.

== Personal life ==
While working at WJLA's Good Morning Washington show, Thuman began dating fellow journalist Autria Godfrey, and married her in 2008. They eventually divorced in 2012.
