= 145th Airlift Wing =

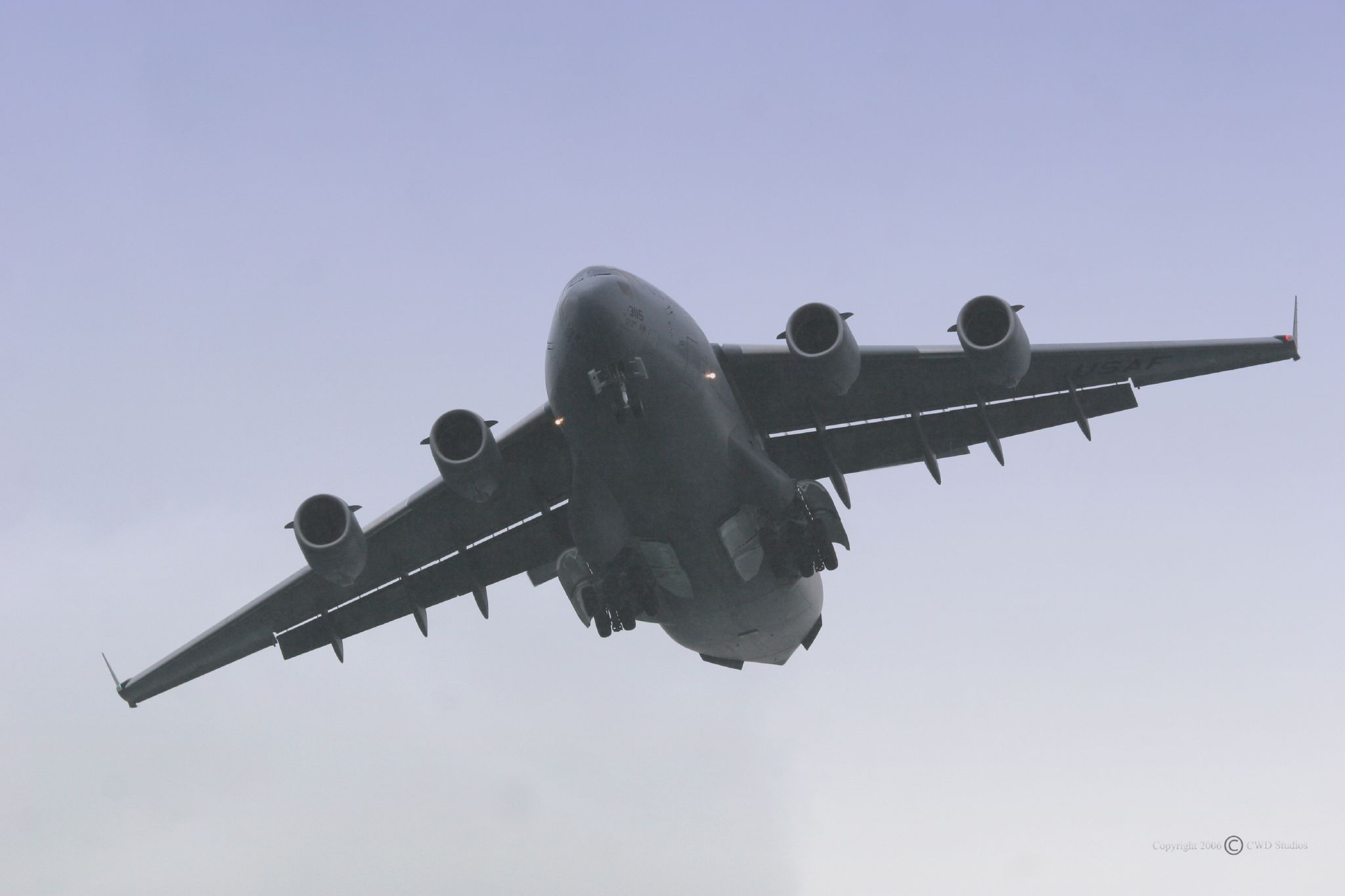
- C-17 Globemaster III
- Active: 1957–present
- Country: United States
- Allegiance: North Carolina
- Branch: Air National Guard
- Type: Wing
- Role: Airlift
- Part of: North Carolina Air National Guard
- Garrison/HQ: Charlotte Air National Guard Base, Charlotte, North Carolina
- Tail Code: Blue tail stripe "Charlotte" in yellow letters
- Decorations: Distinguished Unit Citation

Commanders
- Current commander: Col. Joseph P. King

Insignia
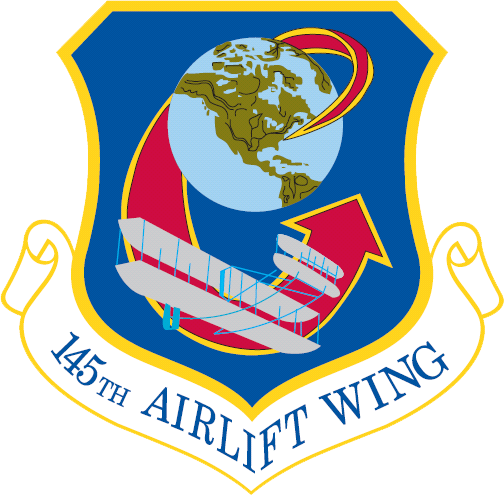
- 145th Airlift Wing emblem

The 145th Airlift Wing is a unit of the North Carolina Air National Guard. It is assigned to Charlotte Air National Guard Base, North Carolina and is equipped with the Boeing C-17 Globemaster III aircraft. If activated to federal service in the United States Air Force, the 145th is gained by Air Mobility Command.

== Units ==
The 145th Airlift Wing consists of the following major units:

- 145th Operations Group

156th Airlift Squadron - C-17 Globemaster III
156th Aeromedical Evacuation Squadron
145th Operations Support Flight

- 145th Mission Support Group
- 145th Maintenance Group

145th Aircraft Maintenance Squadron

- 145th Medical Group
- GSU

118th Air Support Operations Squadron

- 145th Security Forces Squadron

== History ==
=== North Carolina Air National Guard ===
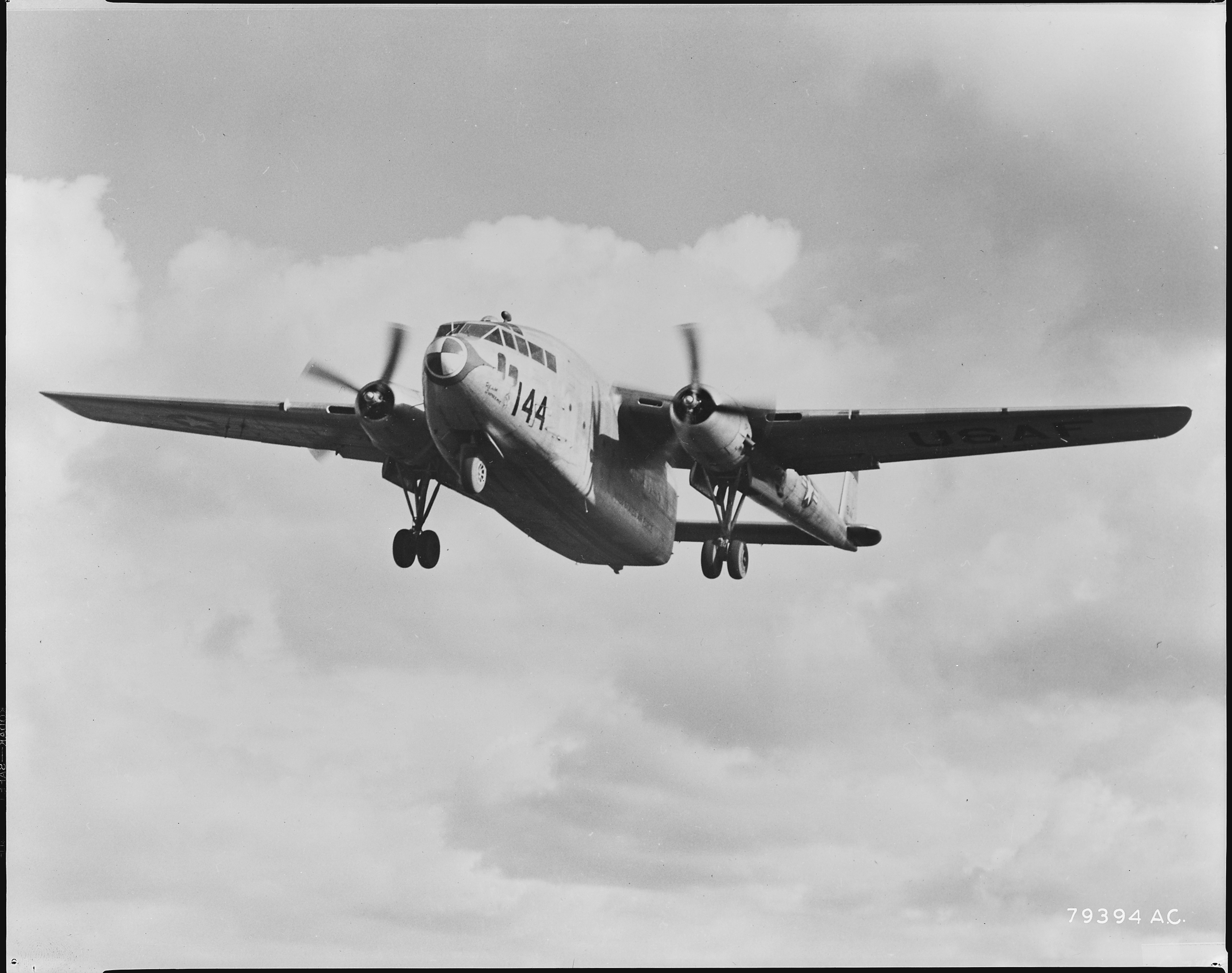
Fairchild C-119 Flying Boxcar

The 145th Fighter Group was constituted and allotted to the North Carolina Air National Guard, at Morris Field, North Carolina on 28 May 1957. Its 156th Fighter Squadron began trading their North American F-86A Sabres, for the more capable F-86E.

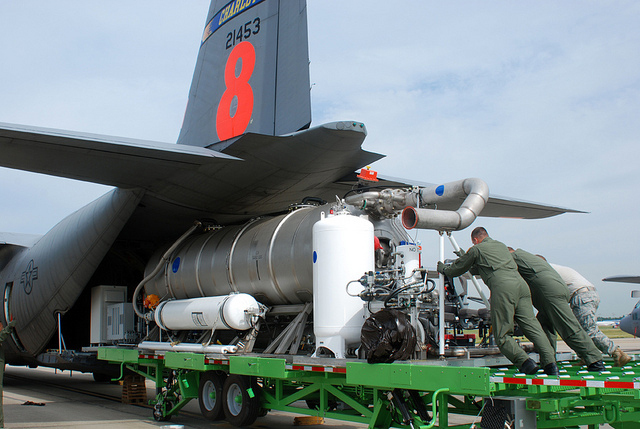
145th Airlift Wing, C-130H being load a Modular Airborne Fire Fighting Systems

The 145th Fighter Group (Air Defense) was assigned to the 126th Air Defense Wing, Illinois Air National Guard, Chicago On 1 February 1961, the group was redesignated the 145th Aeromedical Transport Group, and converted to Fairchild C-119 Flying Boxcars. The group was gained by the 1st Aeromedical Transport Group and Western Transport Air Force, Travis AFB, CA, for training and flying evacuation missions. It transited to Lockheed C-121 Constellation transports during 1962–1965.

On 25 January 1964 the 145th was redesignated 145th Air Transport Group (Heavy). The unit began to convert to Douglas C-124 Globemaster II transports during 1965. From 1966 to 1971 the 145th deployed crews and aircraft to Vietnam, flying over 20 million km without an aircraft accident.

It was redesignated 145th Tactical Airlift Group on 15 May 1971 and re-equipped with Lockheed C-130 Hercules transport aircraft. In 1990 saw the unit mobilized for Operation Desert Shield, followed by Operation Desert Storm in 1991. 15 Mar 1992, brought about another name change with the group becoming the 145th Airlift Group. During 1993 the group started to replace their elderly C-130Bs and take delivery of the more modern C-130H3.

On 1 Oct 1995, it was redesignated the 145th Airlift Wing. On 7 September 2016 saw the end of its aerial firefighting mission using MAFFS (Modular Airborne Fire Fighting System) when it was transferred to the 152nd Airlift Wing, Nevada Air National Guard. There are two other C-130 Air National Guard MAFFS trained units, 153rd Airlift Wing, Wyoming Air National Guard, Cheyenne; the 146th Airlift Wing, California Air National Guard, Channel Islands, CA; and one Air Force Reserve unit, 302nd Airlift Wing, Air Force Reserve, Peterson Air Force Base, CO.

The wing's last C-130 departed on 22 December 2017 before the wing received its first C-17 Globemaster III on Saturday 7 April 2018.

== Lineage ==
- Constituted as the 145th Fighter Group (Air Defense)

Activated on 28 May 1957
Redesignated 145th Aeromedical Transport Group on 1 February 1961
Redesignated 145th Air Transport Group (Heavy) on 25 January 1964
Redesignated 145th Military Airlift Group on 1 January 1966
Redesignated 145th Tactical Airlift Group on 15 May 1971
Redesignated 145th Airlift Group on 16 March 1992
Redesignated 145th Airlift Wing on 1 October 1995

=== Stations ===
- Morris Field (later Douglas International Airport, Charlotte Air National Guard Base), North Carolina, 28 May 1957 – present

=== Aircraft ===
- North American F-86A Sabre, 1957
- North American F-86E Sabre, 1957–1959
- North American F-86L Sabre Interceptor, 1959–1961
- Fairchild C-119C Flying Boxcar, 1961–1962
- Lockheed C-121 Constellation, 1962–1971
- MISSING, C-124 Globemaster
- Lockheed C-130 Hercules, 1971–2017
- Boeing C-17 Globemaster III, 2018–present
