= List of University of Tampa alumni =

This list of University of Tampa alumni includes both graduates and non-graduates of the University of Tampa.

== List ==
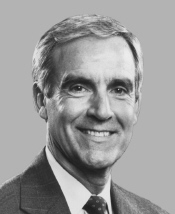
Pete Peterson

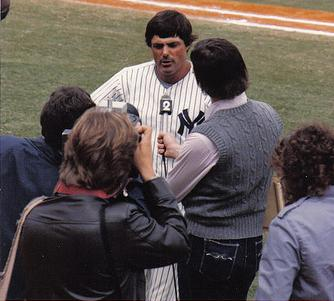
Lou Piniella

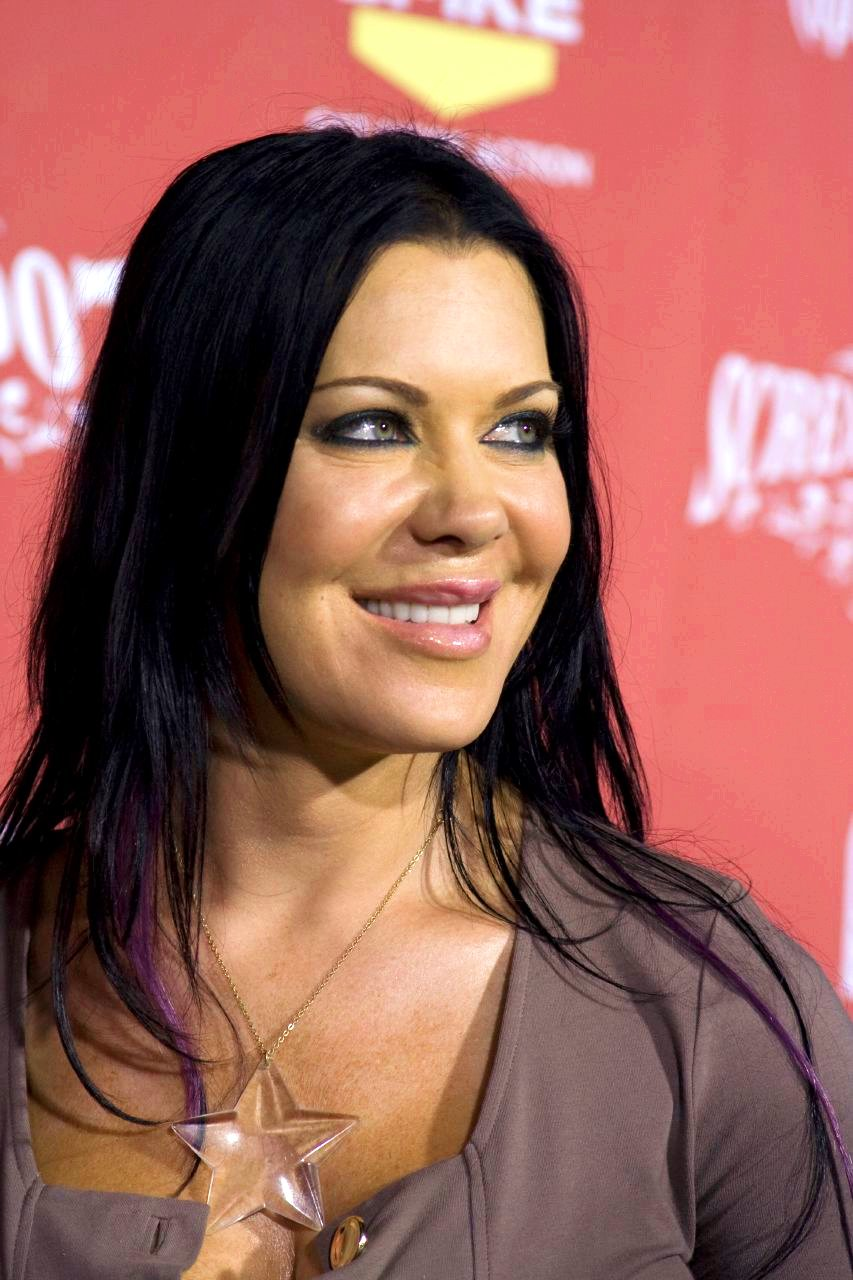
Joanie Laurer

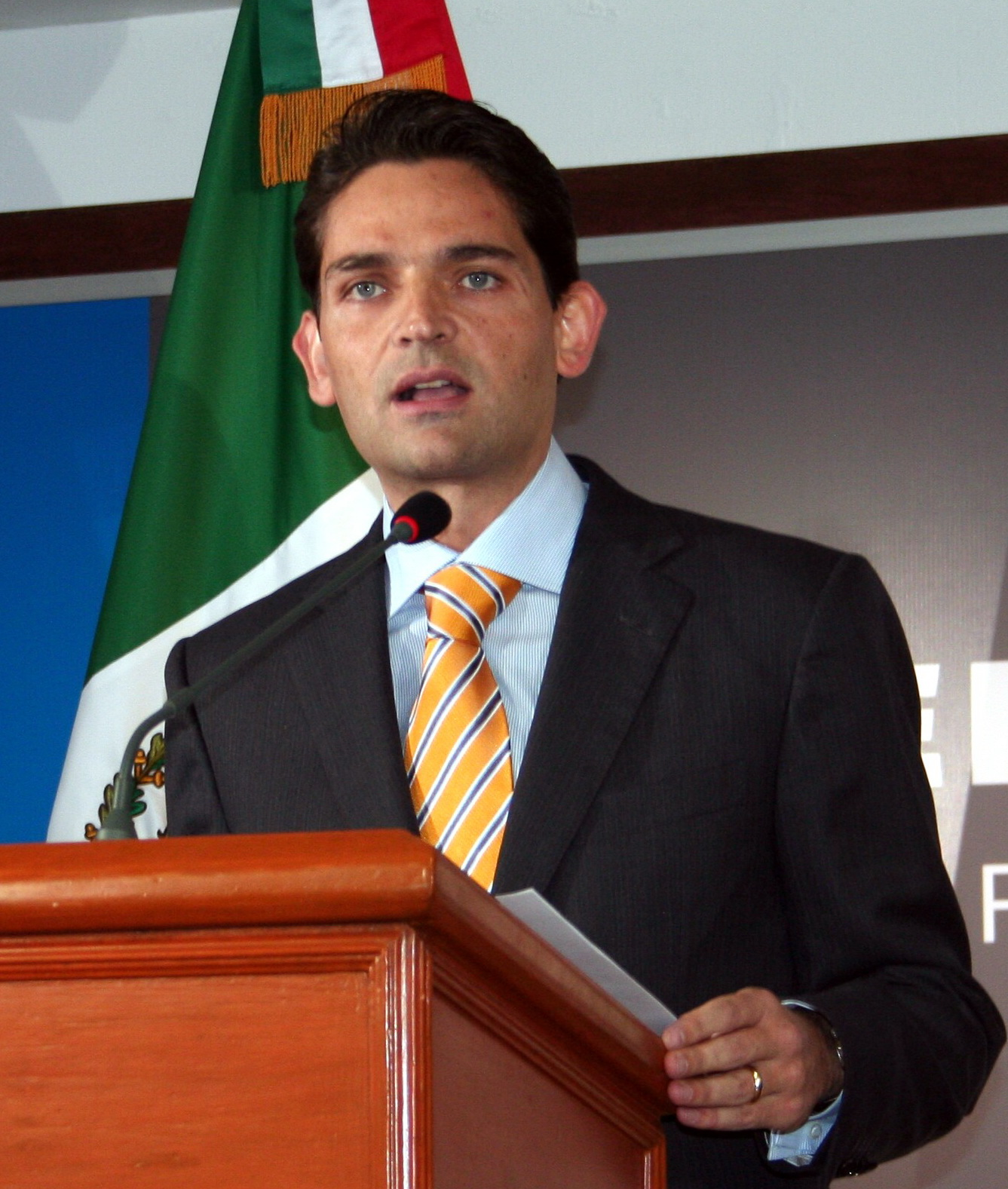
Juan Camilo Mouriño

Alumni	Notability
Colleen Bevis	Children's advocate
Rod Blagojevich (1975)	Illinois governor (2003–2009) (transferred to Northwestern University after two years); in March 2012, began serving a 14-year sentence in federal prison following conviction for corruption
Brock Blomberg (1989)	economist and president of Ursinus College (2015–present)
Eric Calderone	guitarist and YouTuber
Alejandra Caraballo (2012)	civil rights attorney and clinical instructor at the Harvard Law School Cyberlaw Clinic
Virginia Maria Hernandez Covington (1976, MBA 1977)	federal judge currently serving in the U.S. District Court for the Middle District of Florida
Connie May Fowler (1982)	author best known for her book Before Women Had Wings (1996) and its subsequent film adaptation
David Gee (1990)	sheriff of Hillsborough County, Florida
Dick A. Greco (1956)	former Tampa mayor (1967–1974 and 1995–2003)
Amy Hill Hearth	contemporary author of books including Having Our Say: The Delany Sisters' First 100 Years, a New York Times bestseller turned into a Broadway play
Frederick Ward Humphries II	FBI special agent known for disrupting a plot to bomb the Los Angeles International Airport
Nneka Jones (2020)	artist and activist
Dennis James Kennedy (1958)	Presbyterian minister, author, and television evangelist
Joanie Laurer (1992)	former WWE wrestler "Chyna" and model
Scott Leonard (1987)	vocalist with the group Rockapella, the former house band on the TV show Where in the World Is Carmen Sandiego?
Bobby Lord (1952)	country music artist and TV host
Charlie Manning (2001)	MLB pitcher for the Washington Nationals
Bob Martinez (1957)	former governor of Florida (1987–1991)
Tino Martinez (2011)	retired MLB first baseman, most notably with the New York Yankees
John Matuszak (1973)	former NFL player and actor best known as "Sloth" in the movie The Goonies
Brett James McMullen (MBA 1999)	retired U.S. Air Force general officer
Leon McQuay (1970)	former Canadian Football League and National Football League player
Kaitlin Monte (2008)	beauty queen, 2008 Miss Tampa, 2011 Miss New York, and 2012 Miss America finalist
Juan Camilo Mouriño (1993)	Mexican politician
Paul Orndorff (1972)	professional wrestler known as "Mr. Wonderful"
Pete Peterson (1976)	former congressman (1991–1997) and ambassador to Vietnam
Lou Piniella (1969)	baseball manager of the New York Yankees, Cincinnati Reds, Seattle Mariners, Tampa Bay Rays and Chicago Cubs; former MLB player
Freddie Solomon (1975)	former American football player for the Miami Dolphins and San Francisco 49ers
Christopher Sullivan (1987)	broadcaster and former professional soccer player
Charlie White (2016)	YouTuber, streamer, actor, voice actor, podcast host, musician and businessman
Jody Weis (1979)	Chicago Police Department superintendent of police
