= 254th Combat Communications Group =

254th Combat Communications Group

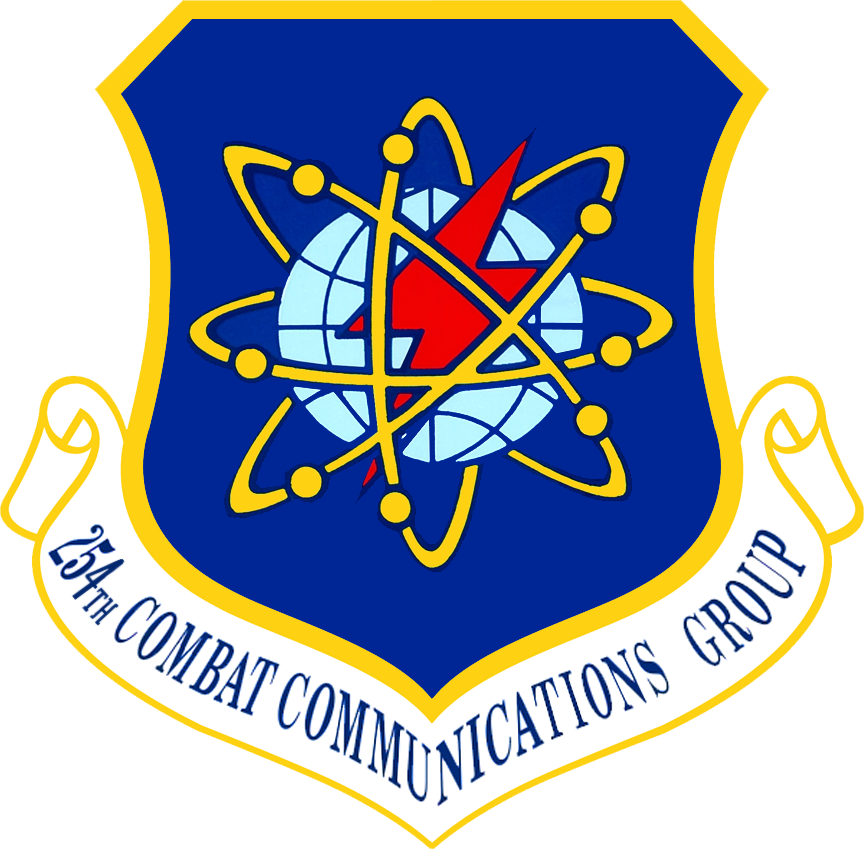
- 254th Combat Communications Group emblem
- Active: 1971 – present
- Country: United States
- Allegiance: Texas Air National Guard
- Branch: United States Air Force
- Type: Combat communications
- Role: Combat support
- Part of: Texas Air National Guard
- Garrison/HQ: Hensley Field, Texas

The 254th Combat Communications Group is a non-flying unit of the Texas Air National Guard located at Hensley Field, Dallas, Texas. If activated to federal service, the group is gained by Air Combat Command.

== Mission ==
=== Federal mission ===
The 254th Combat Communications Group provides a full spectrum of communications capabilities to include planning, engineering, command level coordination, and a wide array of tactical communications solutions to the combatant command or joint task force. The 254th also provides functional advocacy and leadership to eight aligned units spanning seven states. Upon mobilization, Air Force Space Command will assume operational command of the group and direct deployment of the Group.

=== State mission ===
The group's state mission is to provide ready forces to the state of Texas during local or statewide emergencies to protect life and property, and to preserve peace, order, and public safety. The 254th also provides the Texas Adjutant General with voice and data capabilities in austere environments.

== History ==
The group was originally organized as a group headquarters in June 1971 under the name 254th Mobile Communications Group. The unit was co-located with the 221st Mobile Communications Squadron and consisted of assigned units in Texas, Arkansas, Louisiana, and Mississippi.

The unit was later redesignated the 254th Combat Information Systems Group in July 1985. A year later in October 1986 it was redesignated the 254th Combat Communications Group. The group has deployed its personnel and equipment to all corners of the United States and around the world. It has provided direct support to federal operations by deploying personnel to Iraq, Afghanistan, and Kuwait. The 254th has also supported recovery operations for Hurricane Katrina, Hurricane Rita, Hurricane Gustav, Hurricane Ike, and Hurricane Harvey, among others. The group was instrumental in supporting Space Shuttle launches in conjunction with Operation Noble Eagle and moving the 624th Operations Center from Barksdale Air Force Base to Joint Base San Antonio. More recently, the group and its aligned squadrons supported United States Air Forces in Europe in multiple exercises as part of the European Reassurance Initiative.

== Assignments ==
=== Major Command/Gaining Command ===
- Air National Guard/Air Combat Command (2018 – present)
- Air National Guard/Air Force Space Command (2008 – 2018)
- Air National Guard/Air Combat Command (1992 – 2008)
- Air National Guard/Air Force Communications Command (1971 – 1992)

== Previous designations ==
- 254th Combat Communications Group (Oct 1986 – present)
- 254th Combat Information Systems Group (Jul 1985 – Oct 1986)
- 254th Mobile Communications Group (Jun 1971 – Jul 1985)

== Squadrons assigned ==
- 147th Combat Communications Squadron – San Diego, California
- 221st Combat Communications Squadron – Dallas, Texas
- 236th Combat Communications Squadron – Hammond, Louisiana
- 239th Combat Communications Squadron – St. Louis, Missouri
- 242d Combat Communications Squadron – Spokane, Washington
- 264th Combat Communications Squadron – Peoria, Illinois
- 291st Combat Communications Squadron – Hilo, Hawaii
- 292d Combat Communications Squadron – Kahului, Hawaii
- 293rd Combat Communications Squadron – Yigo, Guam

== Squadrons previously assigned ==
- 205th Engineering Installation Squadron – Oklahoma City, Oklahoma
- 214th Engineering Installation Squadron New Orleans, Louisiana
- 219th Engineering Installation Squadron – Tulsa, Oklahoma
- 223rd Combat Communications Squadron – Hot Springs, Arkansas
- 232d Combat Communications Squadron – Montgomery, Alabama
- 248th Air Traffic Control Squadron – Meridian, Mississippi
- 259th Air Traffic Control Squadron – Alexandria, Louisiana
- 285th Combat Communications Squadron – Saint Croix, U.S. Virgin Islands
- 293rd Combat Communications Squadron – Hickam Air Force Base, Hawaii

== Stations ==
- Hensley Field, Texas (2010–present)
- Garland Air National Guard Station, Texas (1953–2010)

== Commander ==
- Colonel Eric G. Hayes

== Decorations ==
- Meritorious Unit Award
  - 2021
- Air Force Outstanding Unit Award five oak leaf clusters
  - 2021
  - 2016
  - 2014
  - 2008
  - 2006
  - 1978
