= Virgin Islands Air National Guard =

U.S. Virgin Islands Air National Guard
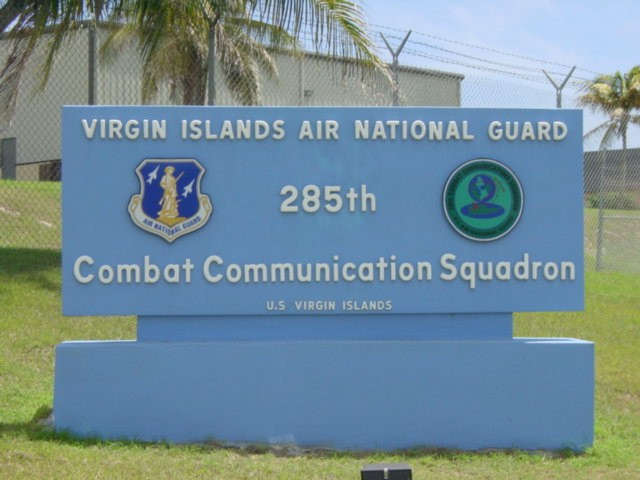
- Entrance sign to the main base of the 285th Combat Communication Squadron
- Active: 7 May 1980–present
- Country: United States
- Allegiance: U.S. Virgin Islands
- Branch: Air National Guard
- Role: USSOUTHCOM combat support
- Garrison/HQ: St Croix ANGS, United States Virgin Islands

Commanders
- Civilian leadership: President Donald Trump (Commander-in-Chief); Secretary of the Air Force Troy Meink; Governor Albert Bryan
- State military leadership: The Adjutant General-Nominee Kodjo S. Knox-Limbacker

Insignia
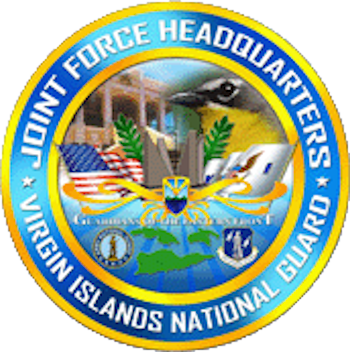
- Emblem of the Joint Forces Virgin Islands National Guard

The Virgin Islands Air National Guard (VI ANG) is the aerial militia of the United States Virgin Islands, an unincorporated territory of the United States of America. It is, along with the Virgin Islands Army National Guard, an element of the Virgin Islands National Guard.

As territorial militia units, the units in the Virgin Islands Air National Guard are not in the normal United States Air Force chain of command. They are under the jurisdiction of the governor of the United States Virgin Islands through the office of the Virgin Islands adjutant general unless they are federalized by order of the president of the United States. The Virgin Islands Air National Guard is headquartered at St Croix Air National Guard Station, Henry E. Rohlsen Airport, St. Croix, and its commander is Deborah Y. Howell.

== Overview ==
Under the "Total Force" concept, Virgin Islands Air National Guard units are considered to be Air Reserve Components (ARC) of the United States Air Force (USAF). Virgin Islands ANG units are trained and equipped by the Air Force and are operationally gained by a major command of the USAF if federalized. In addition, the Virgin Islands Air National Guard forces are assigned to Air Expeditionary Forces and are subject to deployment tasking orders along with their active duty and Air Force Reserve counterparts in their assigned cycle deployment window.

Along with their federal reserve obligations, as territorial militia units the elements of the Virgin Islands ANG are subject to being activated by order of the governor to provide protection of life and property, and preserve peace, order and public safety. Territorial missions include disaster relief in times of earthquakes, hurricanes, floods and forest fires, search and rescue, protection of vital public services, and support to civil defense.

== Components ==
- 285th Civil Engineering Squadron

== History ==
The Virgin Islands Air National Guard was founded on the island of St. Croix in February 1980, as the 285th Combat Communications Flight, a subordinate unit of the 226th Combat Communications Group. The original authorized strength was one officer and 21 enlisted members. Original federal recognition came in May 1980 and is the official beginning of the Virgin Islands Air National Guard. The 285th grew quickly both in size and capability. Within 10 years of inception the unit had won the Air Force Outstanding Unit Award twice and was later awarded the award a third time. St Croix Air National Guard Station was opened in 1986 as the first National Guard–owned facility in the Virgin Islands.

When Hurricane Hugo devastated St. Croix in 1989, the 285th's facility became the heart of the recovery effort, and the 285th provided the first official communications off the island to the rest of the U.S.
