= 201st Combat Communications Group =

United States Airforce unit

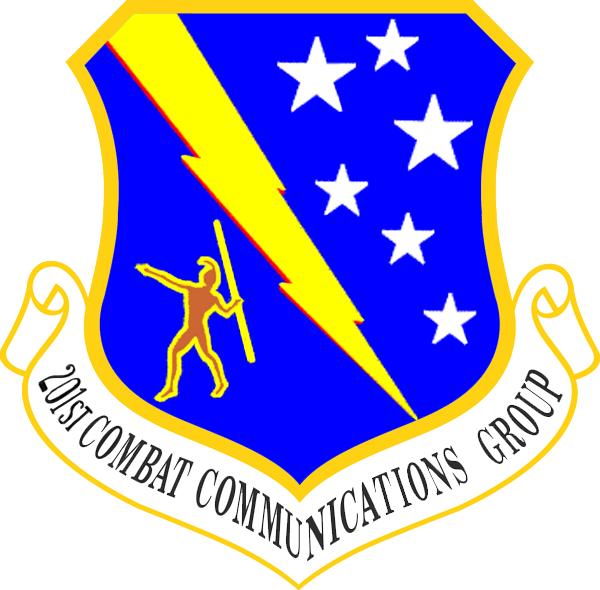
- 201st Combat Communications Group logo
- Active: 1967 – 2013
- Country: United States
- Allegiance: State of Hawaii
- Branch: United States Air Force
- Type: Combat Communications
- Role: Command and Control
- Part of: Hawaii ANG
- Garrison/HQ: Hickam AFB, Hawaii

Commanders
- Notable commanders: Col Joseph A. Garnett (final commander)

The United States Air Force's 201st Combat Communications Group (201 CCG) was a combat communications unit located at Hickam AFB, Hawaii, USA. The 201 CCG was composed of a group headquarters and five assigned units located on the Hawaiian islands of Oahu, Maui, Hawaii and Kauai.

== Mission ==
The 201st CCG's mission was to provide tactical communications and air traffic services in the defense and service of the United States of America and its allies. It also supports emergency United States Air Force requirements for air traffic control and communications facilities, as well as to provide tactical communications for the State of Hawaii, Department of Defense, in response to emergencies originating from either human or natural causes.

== History ==
=== Emblem ===
Azure, a lightning bolt bendwise or garnished gules between a pattern of six mullets of five points of varying sizes argent and in dexter base a silhouetted Hawaiian warrior brown fimbriated of the second, all within a diminished bordure of the like.

== Previous designations ==
- 201st Combat Communications Group (1976–2013)
- 201st Combat Communications Squadron (1967–1976)

== Squadrons previously assigned ==
- 147th Combat Communications Squadron - San Diego, California
- 201st Intelligence Squadron – ???
- 206th Combat Communications Squadron – Elmendorf AFB, Alaska (1 Oct 1987 – 1 Apr 2008)
- 242d Combat Communications Squadron – Fairchild AFB, Washington
- 291st Combat Communications Squadron – Hilo, Hawaii
- 292d Combat Communications Squadron – Kahului, Hawaii
- 293d Combat Communications Squadron – Joint Base Pearl Harbor–Hickam, Hawaii/Pacific Missile Range Facility, Hawaii
- 297th Air Traffic Control Squadron – Kalaeloa, Hawaii

== Bases stationed ==
- Joint Base Pearl Harbor–Hickam, Hawaii (6 March 1967 – 30 September 2013)

== Decorations ==
- Air Force Outstanding Unit Award
  - 1 Jan 1993 – 31 Jul 1994
  - 1 Jul 2003 – 30 Jun 2005
