= 232d Combat Communications Squadron =

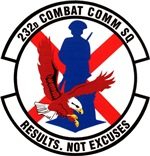
- 232d Combat Communications Squadron emblem
- Active: 1952 – present
- Country: United States
- Branch: United States Air Force
- Type: Combat Communications
- Role: Command and Control
- Size: Squadron
- Part of: Alabama ANG / 226 CCG
- Garrison/HQ: Abston Air National Guard Station, Alabama
- Nickname: Yellowhammers
- Motto: RESULTS. NOT EXCUSES
- Mascot: Yellowhammer

The United States Air Force's 232d Combat Communications Squadron (232 CBCS) is an Air National Guard combat communications unit located at Abston Air National Guard Station, Montgomery, Alabama.

== Mission ==
=== Federal mission ===
The 232 CBCS' federal mission is to provide combat-ready forces for deployment of command, control, and communications-computer (C4) systems for contingency and OPLAN taskings.

=== State Mission ===
The 232 CBCS' state mission is to protect the lives and property of citizens of the state and to generally assure public safety within the borders of the state.

== Lineage ==
=== Previous designations ===
- Constituted as the 232d Airways and Air Communications Service Operations Flight on 26 March 1952 and allotted to the Air National Guard

Activated on 25 September 1952
Federally recognized on 26 September 1952
Redesignated 232d Airways and Air Communications Service Flight, Mobile on 1 October 1953
Redesignated 232d Mobile Communications Flight (Heavy) on 1 July 1961
Inactivated on 14 March 1966

- Constituted as the 232d Mobile Communications Squadron (Bare Base) on 1 January 1966 and allotted to the Air National Guard

Activated on 15 March 1966
Federally recognized on 16 March 1966
Redesignated 232d Combat Communications Squadron (Tactical Airbase) in 1976
Redesignated 232d Combat Information Systems Squadron on 1 July 1985
Redesignated 232d Combat Communications Squadron in 1986

=== Assignments ===
==== Major Command / Gaining Command ====
- Air National Guard / Military Air Transport Service (1952–1961)
- Air National Guard / Air Force Communications Service (later Air Force Communications Command) (1961–1992)
- Air National Guard / Tactical Air Command (later Air Combat Command) (1992–2009)
- Air National Guard / Air Force Space Command (2009–2018)
- Air National Guard / Air Combat Command (2018–present)

==== Aligned Headquarters Unit ====
- 8106th Air Base Squadron (1952–1953)
- 117th Tactical Reconnaissance Wing (1953–1966)
- 251st Mobile Communications Group (later 251st Combat Communications Group) (1966–1971)
- 226th Mobile Communications Group (later 226th Combat Communications Group) (1971–unknown)
- 254th Combat Communications Group (unknown–unknown)
- 226th Combat Communications Group (unknown–present)

=== Stations ===
- H&R Holding Point, Montgomery, Alabama (1952–1953)
- Dannelly Field Air National Guard Base, Montgomery, Alabama (1953–unknown)
- Montgomery Air National Guard Station, Montgomery, Alabama (unknown–1997)
- Abston Air National Guard Station, Montgomery, Alabama (1997–present)

=== Awards and campaigns ===
Award streamer	Award	Dates	Notes
	Air Force Outstanding Unit Award	1 January 1976 – 31 December 1977	
	Air Force Outstanding Unit Award	1 January 1989 – 31 December 1989	
	Air Force Outstanding Unit Award	1 January 1990 – 31 December 1990	
	Air Force Outstanding Unit Award	1 January 1991 – 31 December 1991	
	Air Force Outstanding Unit Award	1 January 1996 – 31 December 1997	
	Air Force Outstanding Unit Award	1 October 2012 – 30 September 2014	
	Air Force Outstanding Unit Award	1 October 2014 – 30 September 2016	
	Air Force Outstanding Unit Award	1 October 2016 – 30 September 2018	
	Air Force Outstanding Unit Award	1 October 2018 – 30 September 2020	

Campaign streamer	Campaign	Phase	Dates	Notes
