= 206 Squadron =

206 Squadron may refer to:

- No. 206 Squadron RAF, United Kingdom
- 206th Tactical Fighter Squadron (JASDF), Japan
- 206 Squadron, Republic of Singapore Air Force; see list of Republic of Singapore Air Force squadrons
- 206th Aero Squadron, Air Service, United States Army
- 206th Combat Communications Squadron, United States Air Force
- VPB-206, United States Navy
- VFP-206, United States Navy
