= 225th Combat Communications Squadron =

- Active: 1954–2008
- Country: United States
- Branch: United States Air Force
- Part of: AFSPC / ANG
- Garrison/HQ: Martin Air National Guard Station, Gadsden, Alabama

Insignia
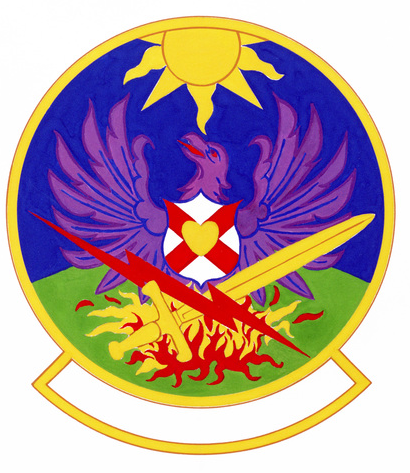
- 225th Combat Communications Squadron emblem

The United States Air Force's 225th Combat Communications Squadron was an Air National Guard combat communications unit located at Martin Air National Guard Station, Gadsden, Alabama.

== History ==
The 225 CBCS was initially organized in March 1953 as the 225th Radio Relay Squadron, in Greenville, Mississippi, Mississippi, as part of the Mississippi Air National Guard. The unit was formally organized on 18 June 1954, and was eventually transferred to the Alabama Air National Guard and relocated to Gadsden. On 22 February 1971, an element of the 225th was divested and reorganized as the Headquarters, 226th Mobile Communications Group. (The 226th eventually became the 226th Combat Communications Group.) The new Group was co-located on Martin Air National Guard Station with the 225th. On 1 October 1960, the 225 RRS was realigned under the Military Air Transport Service. The 226 CCG headquarters relocated to Abston Air National Guard Station in February 1996. The 225 CBCS was inactivated in April 2008.

== AF Component/State Command/Gaining Major Command ==
- Air National Guard/Mississippi Air National Guard/? (1953–1954?)
- Air National Guard/Alabama Air National Guard/? (1954–1960)
- Air National Guard/Alabama Air National Guard/Military Air Transport Service (1960–1966)
- Air National Guard/Alabama Air National Guard/? (1966–1971)
- Air National Guard/Alabama Air National Guard/Tactical Air Command (1971–1992)
- Air National Guard/Alabama Air National Guard/Air Combat Command (1992–2008)
- Air National Guard/Alabama Air National Guard/Air Force Space Command (2008)

== Previous designations ==
- 225th Radio Relay Squadron (June 1954 – February 1971)
- 225th Mobile Communications Squadron (February 1971 – March 1976)
- 225th Combat Communications Squadron (March 1976 – August 1984)
- 225th Combat Information Systems Squadron (August 1984 – October 1986)
- 225th Combat Communications Squadron (October 1986 – April 2008)

== Bases stationed ==
- ??, Greenville, Mississippi, (1953–?)
- Martin Air National Guard Station, Gadsden, Alabama (1957–2008)

== Equipment Operated ==
- (???-Present)
