= 228th Combat Communications Squadron =

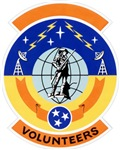
- 228th Combat Communications Squadron emblem
- Active: 1971 – present
- Country: United States
- Branch: United States Air Force
- Type: Combat Communications
- Part of: Air National Guard
- Garrison/HQ: McGhee-Tyson ANGB, Tennessee
- Mottos: "First in Combat Communications, anytime, any place".

The United States Air Force's 228th Combat Communications Squadron (228 CBCS) was an Air National Guard combat communications unit located at McGhee-Tyson ANGB, Tennessee.

== Assignments ==
=== Major Command/Gaining Command ===
- Air National Guard/Air Combat Command (1 Jun 1992 – present)
- Air National Guard/Tactical Air Command (16 Oct 1971 – 1 Jun 1992)

=== Wing/Group ===
- 226th Combat Communications Group (1971 – present)

== Previous designations ==
- 228th Combat Communications Squadron (???-Present)
- 228th Mobile Communications Squadron (Contingency) (16 October 1971-???)

== Bases stationed ==
- McGhee-Tyson ANGB, Tennessee (1971 – present)

== Equipment Operated ==
TRC-170 TSC-85C TSC-94 PSC-5D

== Awards and decorations ==
- Air Force Outstanding Unit Award (AFOUO):
  1 January 1976 – 31 December 1977;
  1 January – 31 December 1990;
  1 September 1997 – 31 August 1999;
