= Virgin Islands National Guard =

Component of the National Guard based in the U.S. Virgin Islands

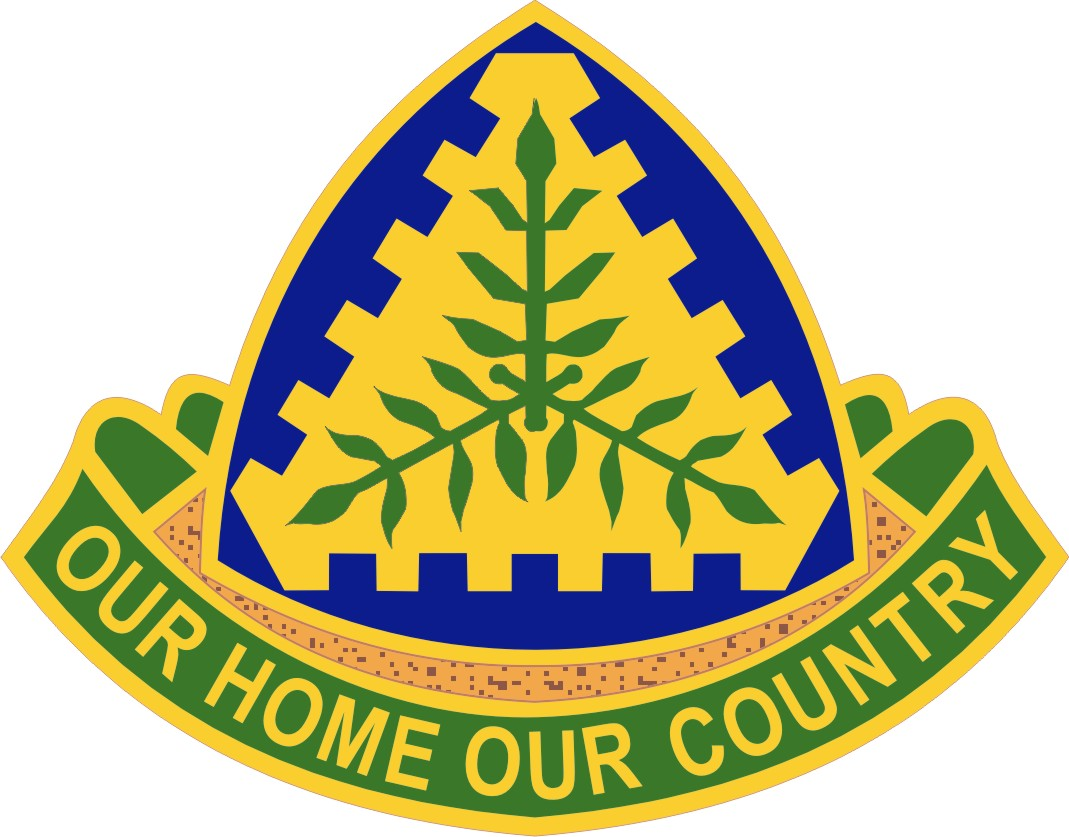
- Virgin Islands National Guard HQ DUI
- Founded: 19 October 1973
- Country: United States
- Allegiance: U.S. Virgin Islands
- Branch: United States Army; United States Air Force
- Role: United States Army National Guard United States Air National Guard "When directed by the Governor, service members will serve and protect the interests of the Territory and its citizens."
- Size: 1,000
- Garrison/HQ: Saint Croix
- Motto: The Guardians of the Eastern Front

Commanders
- Commander-in-Chief: President Donald Trump
- Governor of the United States Virgin Islands: Albert Bryan Jr.
- Adjutant General: Major-General Kodjo S. Knox-Limbacker
- Director of Joint Staff: Colonel Glenda M. Mathurine-Lee

Insignia
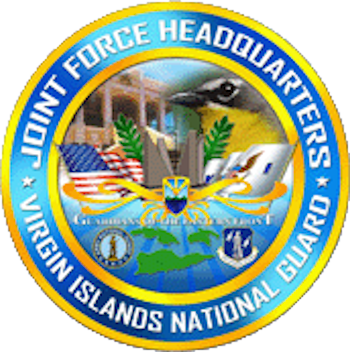
- Emblem of the Joint Forces Virgin Islands National Guard

- Virgin Islands Army National Guard Crest

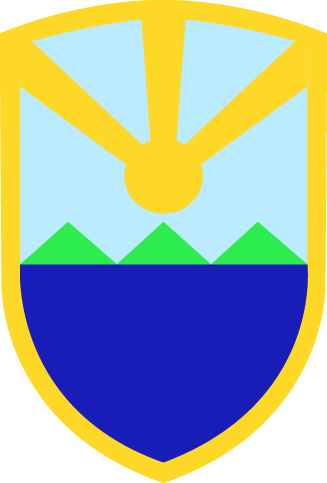
- Virgin Islands Army National Guard STARC SSI

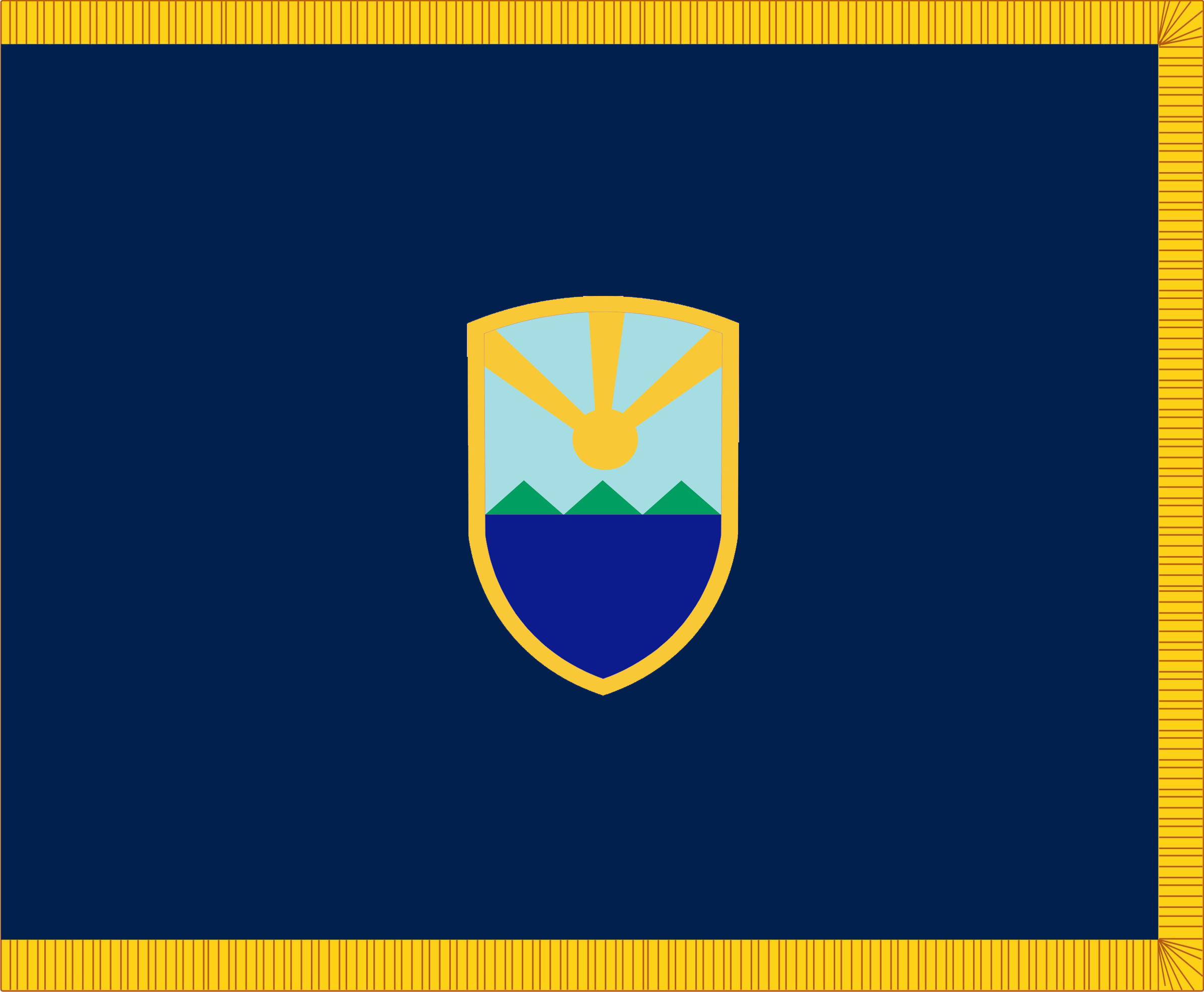
- Virgin Islands Army National Guard Headquarters Flag

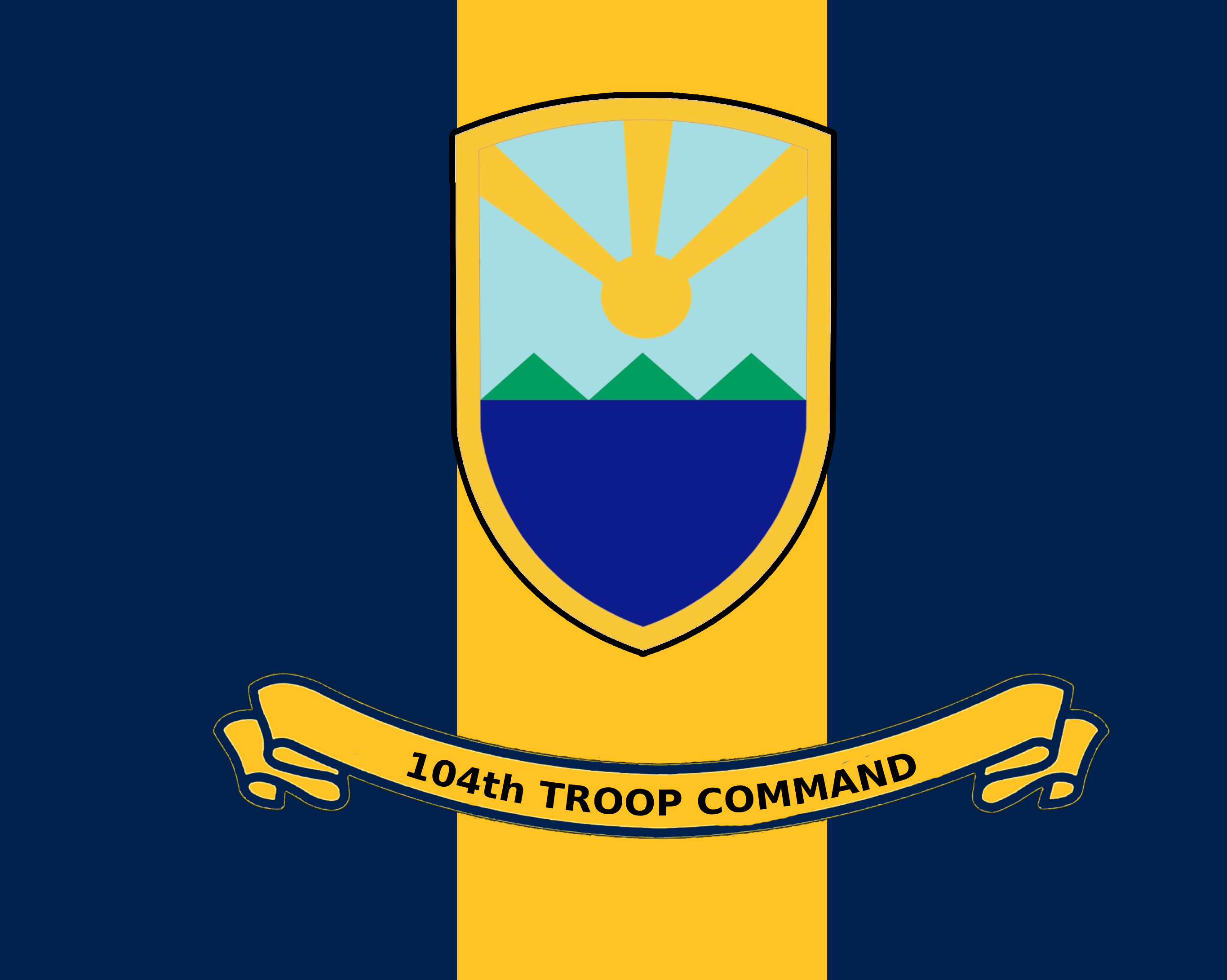
- Virgin Islands Army National Guard 104th Troop Command Flag

The Virgin Islands National Guard (VING) is a component of the United States Armed Forces' National Guard based in the United States Virgin Islands. It was established on October 19, 1973 in a ceremony officiated by Major-General La Vern E. Weber, then serving as the director of the Army National Guard. Major Leayle Galiber was concurrently appointed as acting Adjutant-General and took command of the first two VING units to be activated, a headquarters detachment and the 661st Military Police Company, both of which were stationed on the island of Saint Croix.

== Organization ==
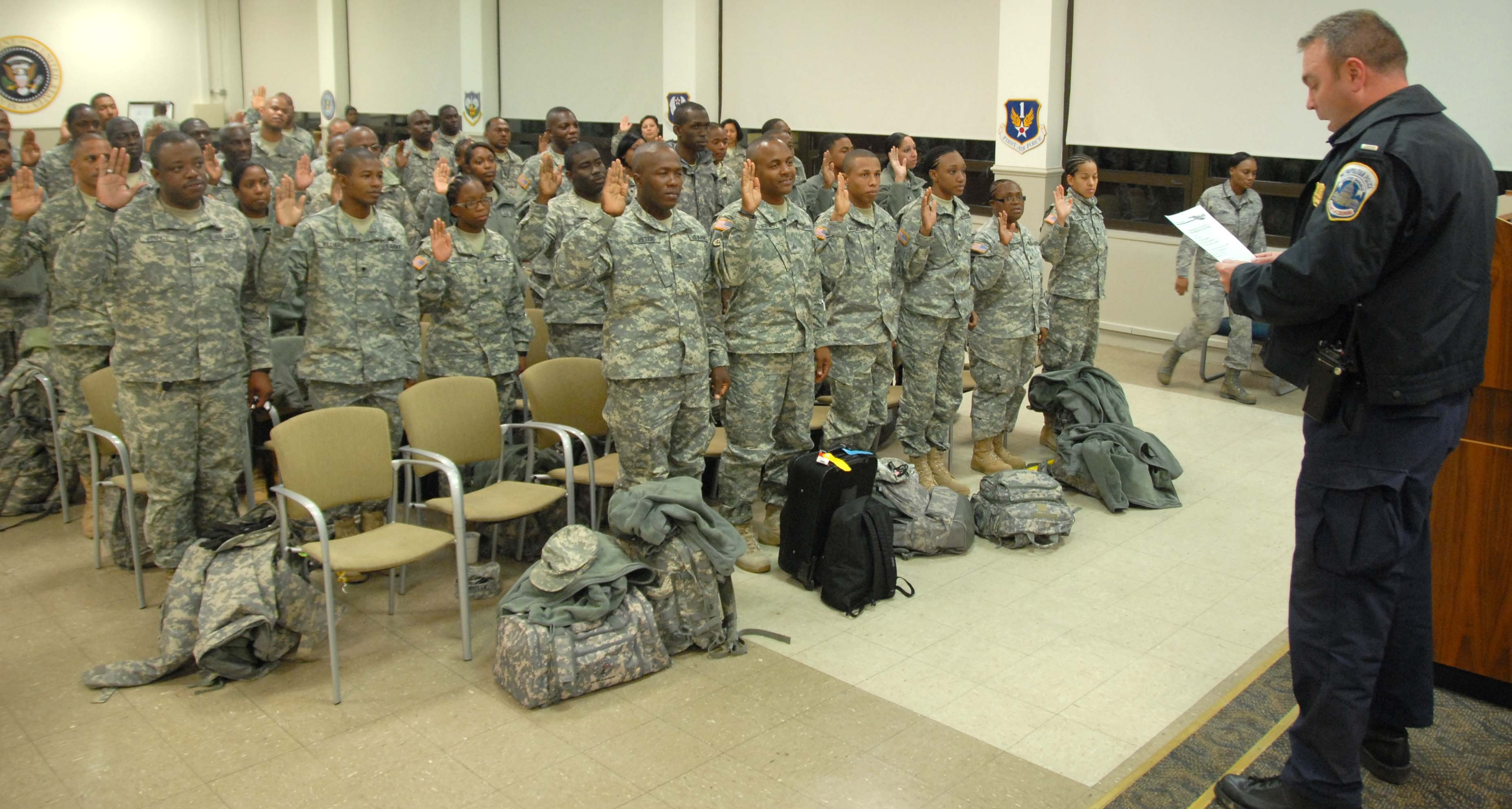
An MPDC officer deputizing members of the Virgin Islands National Guard who have just landed at Andrews Air Force Base for the second inauguration of Barack Obama.

=== Virgin Islands Army National Guard ===
As of February 2026 the Virgin Islands Army National Guard consists of the following units:

- Joint Force Headquarters-Virgin Islands, Army Element, in Kingshill
  - Headquarters and Headquarters Detachment, Joint Force Headquarters-Virgin Islands, Army Element, in Kingshill
  - Virgin Islands Recruiting & Retention Battalion
  - Virgin Islands Medical Detachment, in Kingshill
  - 23rd Civil Support Team (WMD)
  - 1947th Support Detachment (Contracting Team)
  - Army Aviation Operations Facility #1, at Henry E. Rohlsen Airport
  - Combined Support Maintenance Shop #1
  - Field Maintenance Shop #1
  - 104th Special Troops Battalion
    - 104th Headquarters Company
    - 51st Public Affairs Detachment
    - 210th Regiment, Regional Training Institute
    - 661st Military Police Company
    - Detachment 1, Company D (MEDEVAC), 1st Battalion (Security & Support), 114th Aviation Regiment, at Henry E. Rohlsen Airport (UH-72A Lakota)
  - 786th Combat Sustainment Support Battalion, in Charlotte Amalie
    - Headquarters and Headquarters Company, 786th Combat Sustainment Support Battalion, in Charlotte Amalie
    - 73rd Army Band
    - 610th Quartermaster Company (Water Purification and Distribution)
    - 630th Quartermaster Detachment (Tactical Water Distribution Team) (Hoseline)
    - 631st Engineer Detachment (Utilities)
    - 662nd Engineer Company (Engineer Support Company)
    - Detachment 1, 547th Transportation Company (Light-Medium Truck)

=== Virgin Islands Air National Guard ===
As of February 2026 the Virgin Islands Air National Guard consists of the following units:

- Joint Force Headquarters-Virgin Islands, Air Element, in Kingshill
  - Headquarters and Headquarters Detachment, Joint Force Headquarters-Virgin Islands, Army Element, in Kingshill
  - 285th Civil Engineering Squadron

== History ==
The Virgin Islands National Guard was federally recognized on October 19, 1973 and has largely engaged in disaster response and relief. Its first foreign deployment was when it was deployed for Operation Joint Endeavor in 1995 and has since been deployed to Iraq, Afghanistan, Kuwait, Kosovo, Haiti, and Cuba.

== Decorations ==
The Virgin Islands National Guard has authorized several state decorations for wear by its personnel, including:

- Virgin Islands Distinguished Service Medal (VIDSM)
- Virgin Islands Meritorious Service Medal (VIMSM)
- Virgin Islands Commendation Medal (VICOM)
- Virgin Islands Long and Faithful Service Medal (VILFSM)
- Virgin Islands Emergency Service Ribbon (VIESR)
