= 292d Combat Communications Squadron =

United States Airforce unit

292nd Combat Communications Squadron
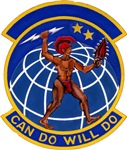
- 292nd Combat Communications Squadron logo
- Active: 1988 – present
- Country: United States
- Allegiance: Hawaii Air National Guard
- Branch: United States Air Force
- Type: Combat Communications
- Garrison/HQ: Kahului, Hawaii
- Mottos: "Hiki No, Hana No" (Can Do, Will Do)

The United States Air Force's 292nd Combat Communications Squadron is a combat communications unit located at Kahului, Hawaii.

== History ==
=== Emblem Significance ===
The figure of the Hawaiian warrior significantly represents the Hawaii Air National Guard, specifically the 292 CBCS. The barefoot countenance of the warrior signifies the unit's mobility. Held in his left hand is a Hawaiian leiomano (shark tooth war club), symbolizing combat mission of the 292 CBCS. The lightning streak held in the right hand as a spear represents communications. Further symbolizing the unit's communications background. The globe symbolizes the units worldwide capability and the blue background symbolizes Space, the primary medium in which the Air Force performs its missions. The two stars on the globe represents Air Force and Air National Guard symbolizing the United States "Total Force" philosophy. Overall, the design represents a unit capable of conducting mobile communications in a combat environment.

== Previous designations ==
- 292nd Combat Communications Squadron (1988 – present)
- 201st Combat Communications Flight (1977–1988)
- 202nd Mobile Communications Squadron (??–1977)

== Bases stationed ==
- Kahului, Hawaii (??-Present)

== See also ==
- Hawaii Air National Guard
- 201st Combat Communications Group
- 291st Combat Communications Squadron
- 293rd Combat Communications Squadron
