= Yellowhammer (disambiguation) =

The yellowhammer is Emberiza citrinella, a species of Old World passerine bird.

Yellowhammer may also refer to:

- A regional name for the yellow shafted subspecies (Colaptes auratus auratus) of the northern flicker, a North American woodpecker
- Yellowhammer, a nickname for someone from Alabama
- Yellowhammer News, a conservative news website in Alabama
- Yellow hammer, 12–6 curveball in baseball
- Operation Yellowhammer, contingency plan for a "no-deal" Brexit
- Yellowhammer cookie, the state cookie of Alabama
