= 293rd Combat Communications Squadron =

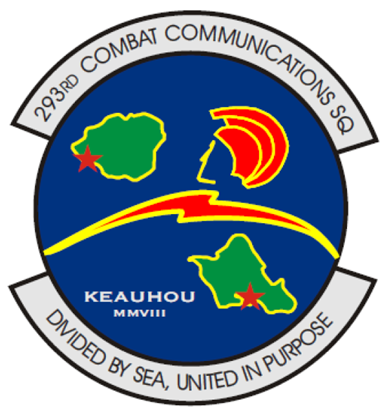
- 293rd Combat Communications Squadron logo
- Active: 1967 – 2016
- Country: United States
- Branch: United States Air Force
- Type: Combat Communications
- Role: Command and Control
- Size: 140
- Part of: Hawaii ANG/201st CCG
- Garrison/HQ: Pacific Missile Range Facility/Hickam AFB, Hawaii
- Motto(s): DIVIDED BY SEA, UNITED IN PURPOSE

The United States Air Force's 293rd Combat Communications Squadron was a combat communications unit located at the Pacific Missile Range Facility and Hickam AFB, Hawaii.

== Mission ==
=== Federal mission ===
The 293 CBCS' federal mission is to provide operationally-ready combat units, combat support units and qualified personnel for active duty in the United States Air Force in times of war, national emergencies, or operational contingencies.

=== State Mission ===
The 293 CBCS' state mission is to provide organized and trained units to the Governor of Hawaii and Adjutant General to protect Hawaii's citizens and property, preserve peace, and ensure public safety in response to natural or human-caused disasters.

== History ==
The 293rd Combat Communications Squadron (293 CBCS) was activated into federal service on 6 March 1967 at Hickam AFB, Hawaii. From 6 March 1967 to 30 September 2008, the 293 CBCS was co-located with its parent group, the 201st Combat Communications Group (201 CCG) at Hickam Air Force Base. By the direction of the Adjutant General and with the concurrence of the National Guard Bureau, the 293rd became the first geographically split-operations combat communications squadron in both the Air Force and the Air National Guard. Effective 1 October 2008, the 293rd's command element and 52% of its assigned manpower were transferred to the US Navy's Pacific Missile Range Facility Barking Sands to replace the inactivating 154th Air Control Squadron (154 ACS) as the Hawaii National Guard's lead command and control element for any natural or human-caused disasters on the Island of Kauai, while the remaining 48% remained assigned to Hickam AFB as Operating Location A, 293 CBCS. Despite the geographic separation of 125 miles between the 293rd's two organizational elements, the squadron was organized, operated, and deployed much like any other single-location Air Force/Air National Guard combat communications squadron. The 293rd was inactivated on 6 November 2016, after nearly five decades of distinguished service.

== Previous designations ==
- 293rd Combat Communications Squadron (3 October 1976 – 6 November 2016)
- 202nd Combat Communications Flight (dates unknown)
- 202nd Mobile Communications Flight (13 October 1967 – 3 October 1976)

== Bases stationed ==
- Pacific Missile Range Facility, Hawaii (1 October 2008 – 6 November 2016)
  - Operating Location A, 293 CBCS – Hickam AFB, Hawaii (1 October 2008 – 6 November 2016)
- Hickam AFB, Hawaii (13 October 1967 – 1 October 2008)

== Equipment operated ==
- (????–present)
- AN/FRC-153
- AN/MSQ-10
- AN/TSC-15
- AN/TSC-60
- AN/TSC-62
- AN/TRC-97
- AN/TRC-136
- AN/MRC-108

== Photo gallery ==
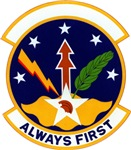
293 CBCS (pre 2001)

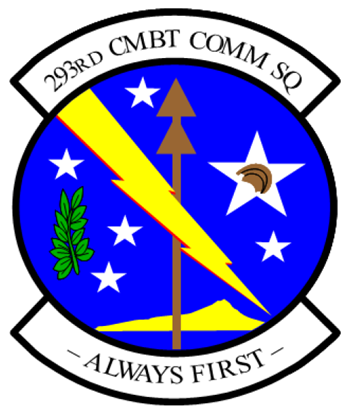
293 CBCS (pre 2009)

== See also ==
- Hawaii Air National Guard
- 201st Combat Communications Group
- 291st Combat Communications Squadron
- 292d Combat Communications Squadron
