= 280th Special Operations Communications Squadron =

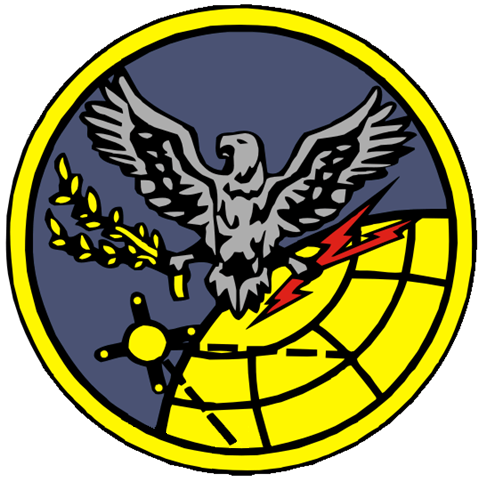
- 280th Combat Communications Squadron Insignia
- Active: 1959 – present
- Country: United States
- Branch: United States Air Force
- Type: Special Operations Communications
- Role: Special Ops Combat Support
- Part of: AFSOC / ANG / 226th Combat Communications Group
- Garrison/HQ: Hall Air Guard Station, Alabama
- Nickname: "The Warriors Voice"
- Mottos: "Vox Bellatorum" (current) "Communications for Peace" (old)
- Engagements: "Operation Allied Force" "Operation Desert Shield" "Operation Enduring Freedom" "Operation Iraqi Freedom" "Operation New Dawn" "Resolute Support Mission"
- Decorations: AFOUA AFOEA

The Air National Guard's 280th Special Operations Communications Squadron (280th SOCS) is a communications unit located at Hall Air Guard Station, Dothan Regional Airport, Alabama. The 280th SOCS provides tactical communication services to state, military and federal agencies utilizing state of the art information systems. The 280th SOCS provides over 44% of Air Force Special Operations Command's deployed communications capabilities.

== Mission ==
The mission of the 280th Special Operations Communications Squadron is to provide communications and information systems for Command and Control of United States Special Operations Forces worldwide, as well as respond to State emergencies as directed by the Governor.

== History ==
In January 1959, the 280th SOCS was federally recognized as the 280th Communications Squadron (Special). The first members enlisted in the squadron in March 1959.

During 1967, members of the 280th Communications Squadron (Special) were selected for training in response to then-President Johnson's directive to use Army and Air Guard units to maintain domestic order. Those members were appointed to Team 3 of Task Force Foxtrot, which was responsible for riot control.

October 1982, the unit was redesignated as the 280th Combat Communications Squadron. In January 2014, the squadron was redesignated as the 280th Special Operations Communications Squadron.

The squadron moved from Maxwell Air Force Base to Abston Air National Guard Station in October 1986, then to Hall Air National Guard Station in April 1996.

In February 1999, the 280th was formally integrated into the mission of the Air Force Special Operations Command.

=== Emblem Description and Significance ===
On a blue disc. Issuing from lower right is a yellow hemisphere grid lined black. A yellow satellite in lower left emitting two black dash lines to the sphere; above the sphere and satellite a gray eagle with wings displayed throughout detailed black olive branches in his left claw, a pair of red lightning bolts in the other claw; all within a narrow yellow border.

Blue and yellow are the Air Force colors. Blue alludes to the sky, the primary theater of Air Force operations. Yellow refers to the sun and the excellence required of Air Force personnel. The globe represents the worldwide scope of mobility. The eagle symbolizes strength and keenness of vision. The lightning flashes and olive branches refer to the unit's motto, COMMUNICATIONS FOR PEACE. The satellite reflects the high technology required of the unit in order to perform its mission.

== Assignments ==
=== Major Command/Gaining Command ===
- Air National Guard/Air Force Special Operations Command (1999 – present)
- Air National Guard/Air Combat Command (1992–1999)
- Air National Guard/United States Special Operations Command (????–1999)
- Air National Guard/Tactical Air Command (1971–1992)
- Air National Guard/Air Force Communications Command (????–????)
- Air National Guard/United States Readiness Command (????–????)

=== Wing/Group ===
- 226th Combat Communications Group (1971 – present)

== Previous designations ==
- 280th Special Operations Communications Squadron (Jan 2014 – present)
- 280th Combat Communications Squadron (Oct 1982–Jan 2014)
- 280th Communications Squadron (Special) (Jan 1959-Oct 1982)

== Bases stationed ==
- Hall Air National Guard Station, Dothan, Alabama (Apr 1996–present)
- Abston Air National Guard Station, Montgomery, Alabama (Oct 1986-Apr 1996)
- Maxwell Air Force Base, Alabama (Jan 1959-Oct 1986)

== Decorations ==
- Air Force Outstanding Unit Award
  - 1 Jul 1968 – 31 Dec 1969
  - 1 Jul 1971 – 31 Dec 1972
  - 1 Jan 1989 – 31 Dec 1989
  - 1 Jan 1990 – 31 Dec 1990
  - 1 Jan 1991 – 31 Dec 1991
  - 1 Jan 1996 – 31 Dec 1997
  - 1 Oct 2010 – 30 Sep 2012
- Air Force Organizational Excellence Award
- Air Force Communications and Information Major General Harold M. McClelland Award
  - 1 Jan 1990 – 31 Dec 1990

== Photo gallery ==
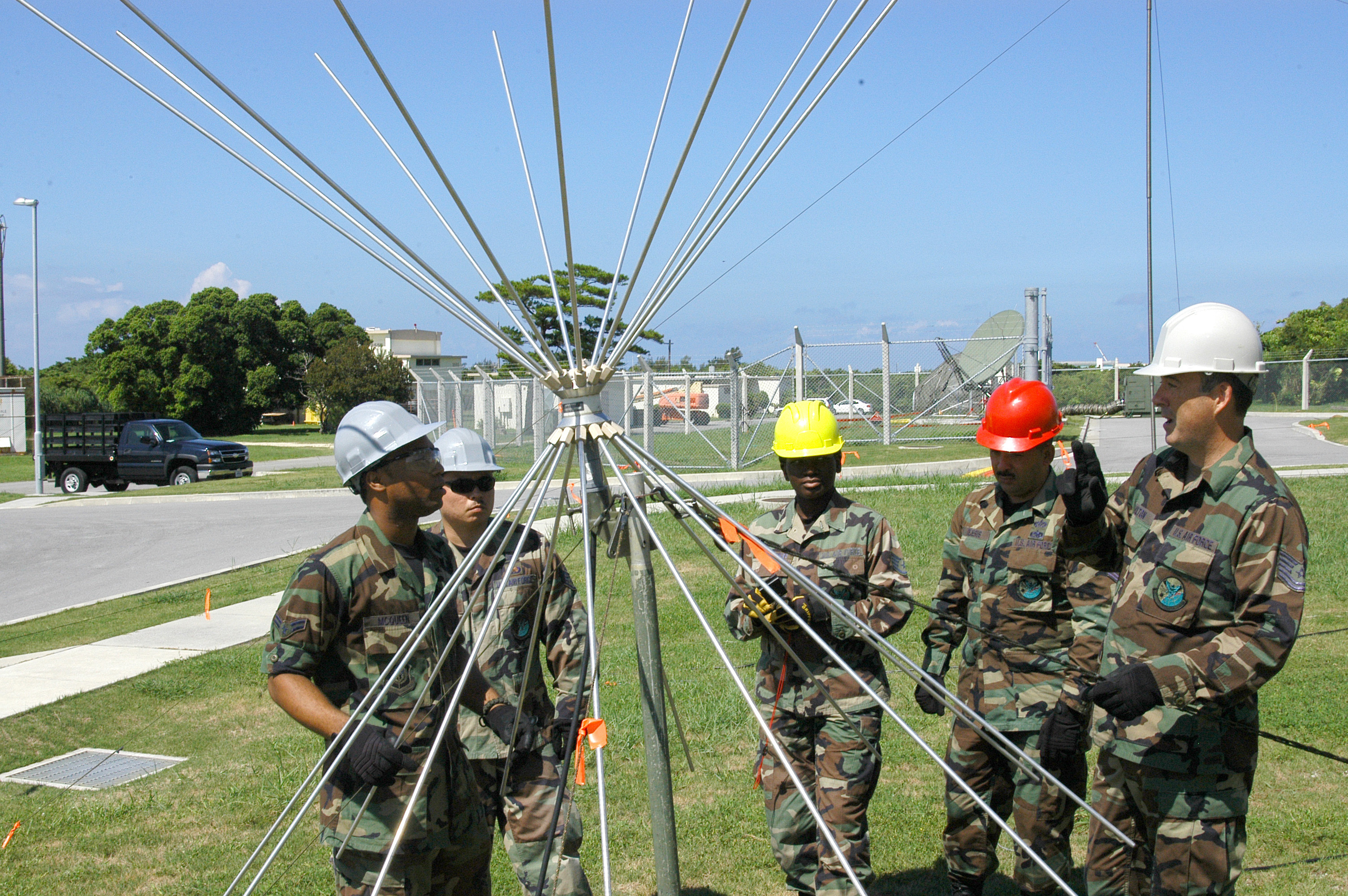
280th CBCS Members at Kadena AB

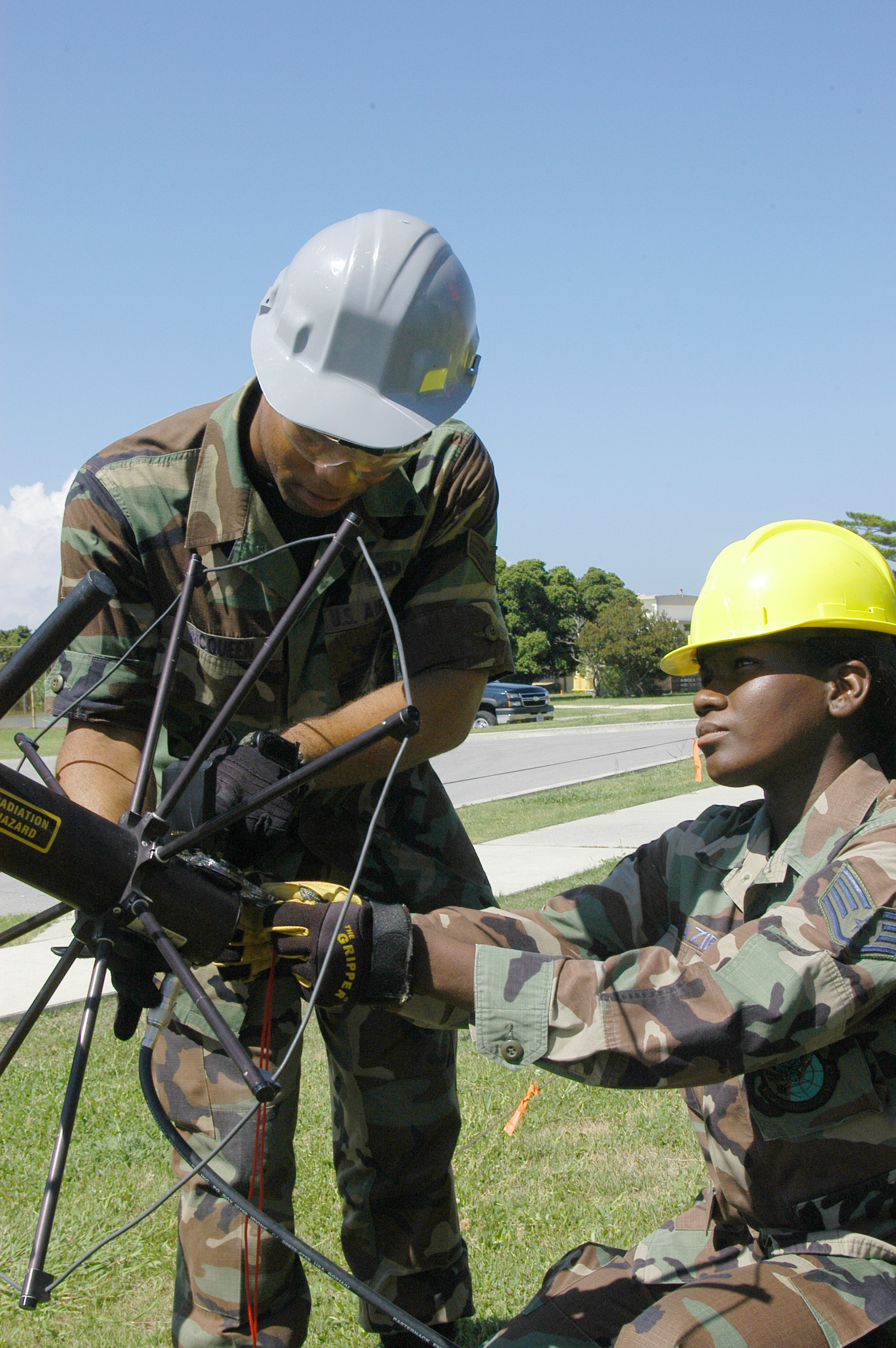
280th CBCS verify antenna installation at Kadena AB

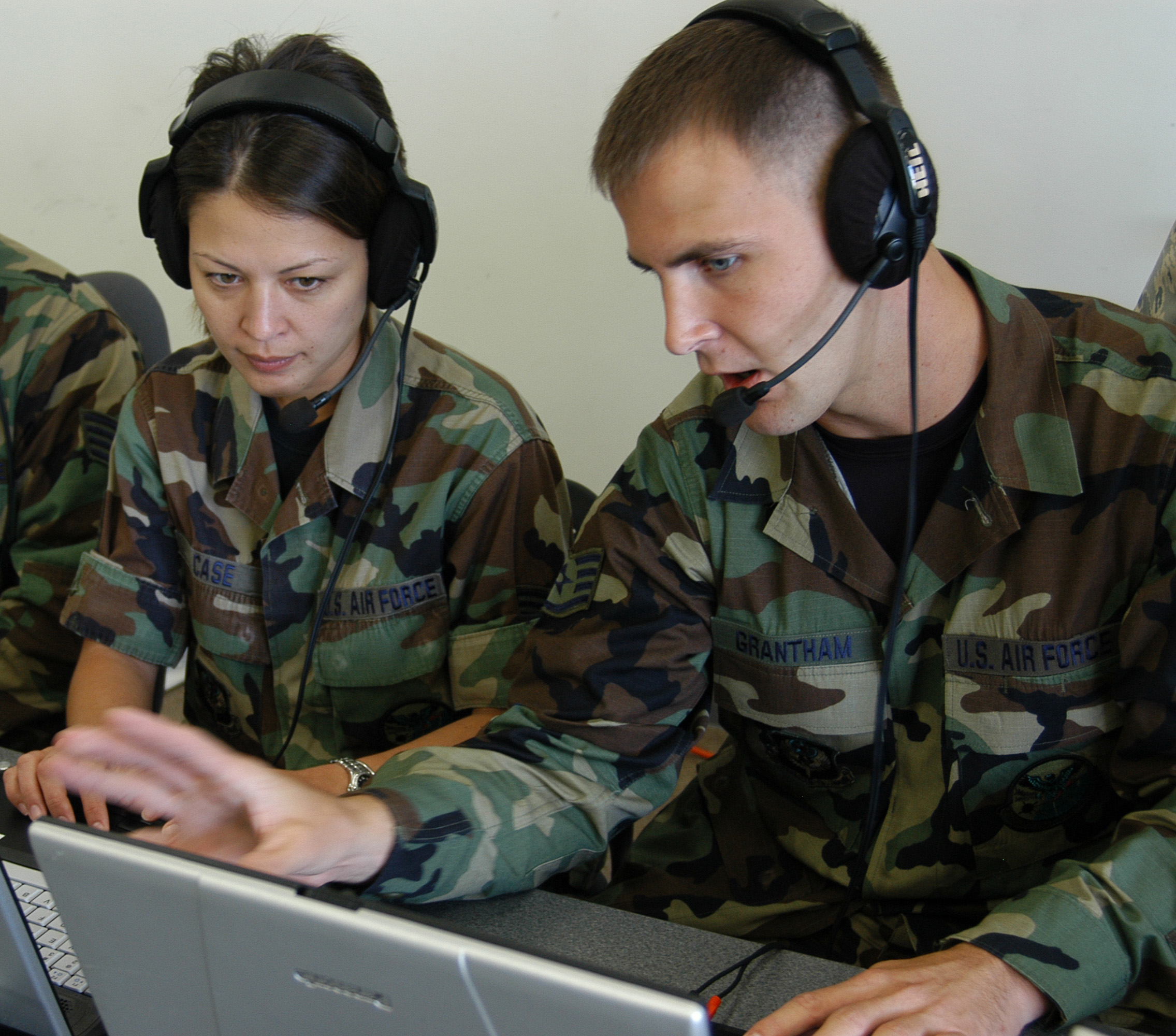
280th CBCS members working on a Joint Base Station setup
