= Yellowhammer cookie =

Type of stuffed drop cookie

- Type: Cookie
- Course: Dessert
- Place of origin: Montgomery, Alabama
- Main ingredients: Peanuts; Pecans; Oats; Honey; Peanut butter

A yellowhammer cookie is a type of stuffed drop cookie containing peanuts, pecans, oats, honey and peanut butter. Invented for a school baking competition, it became the official state cookie of Alabama later that year. The recipe includes locally relevant ingredients and is named after Alabama's State Bird.

== History ==
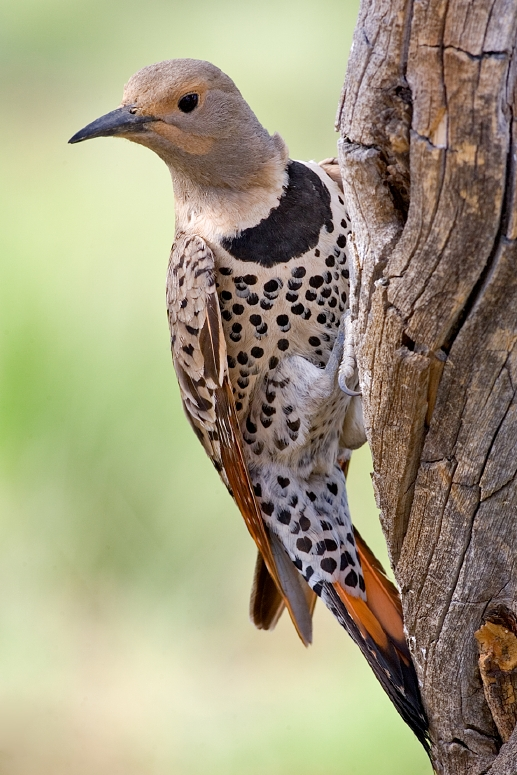
Yellowhammer cookies are named after the yellowhammer, the state bird of Alabama.

The yellowhammer cookie was invented in 2023 by Trinity Presbyterian School's 4th grade class as part of civics lesson. The students competed to create a cookie recipe that represented the state of Alabama. The recipe includes ingredients associated with the agricultural history of Alabama, including oats, peanuts, which are the state's official legume, and pecan, which are its official nut. The class contacted State House Representative Reed Ingram who sponsored a bill to make the 4th grade recipe the official state cookie of Alabama. On June 2, 2023, the bill was signed into law by Governor Kay Ivey. The name comes from the state bird of Alabama, the yellowhammer.

== Description ==
Yellowhammer cookies are drop cookies, made with a dough of flour, butter, brown sugar, oats, pecans, eggs, and vanilla. After baking, two cookies are sandwiched around a peanut butter and honey filling.
