= Kodjo S. Knox-Limbacker =

U.S. Army general

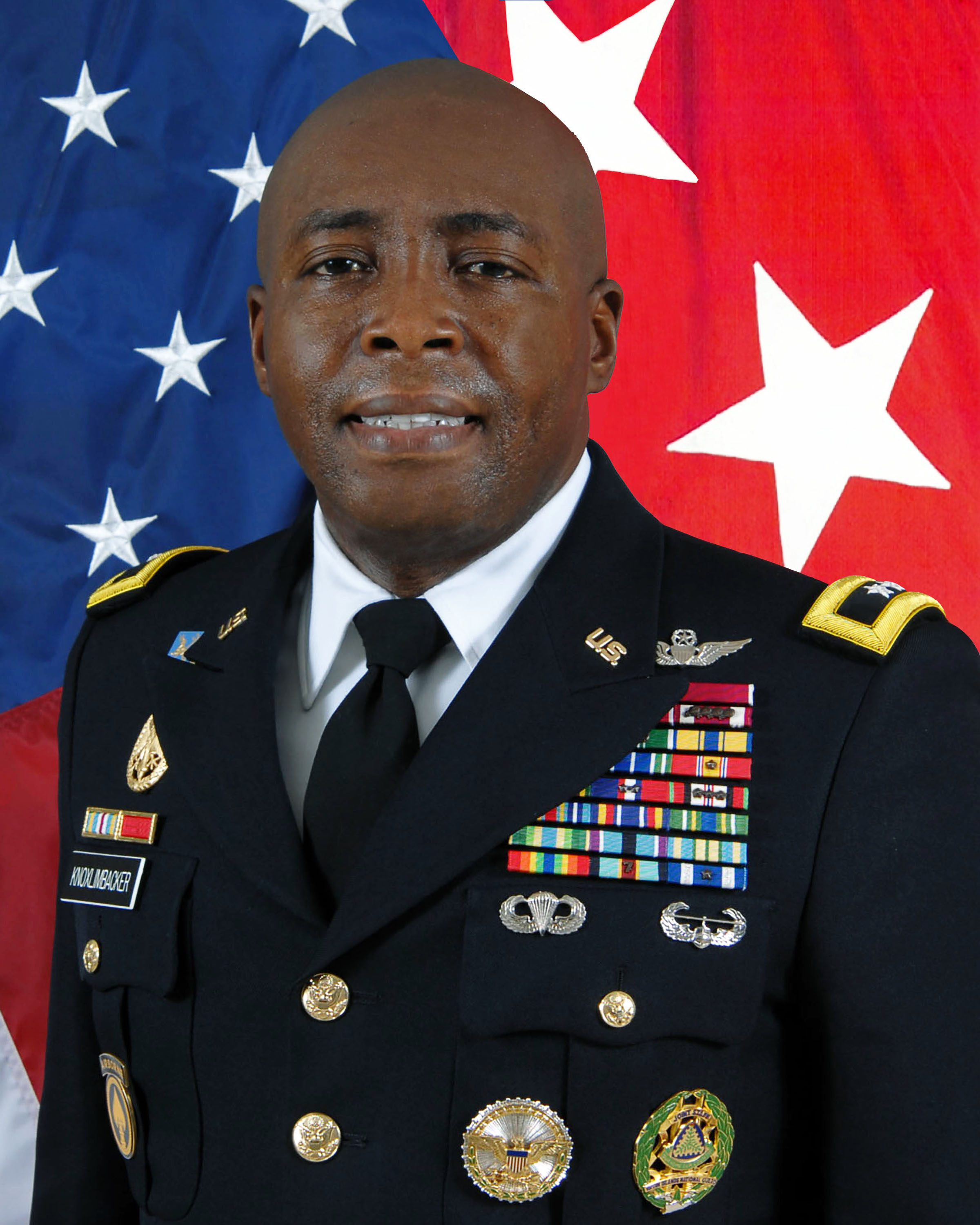
- Official portrait, 2021
- Born: 1972 (age 53–54); Saint Croix, United States Virgin Islands
- Military career
- Allegiance: United States
- Branch: United States Army; Army National Guard
- Service years: 1991–present
- Rank: Major General
- Commands: Virgin Islands National Guard; 204th Military Intelligence Battalion (Aerial Reconnaissance, 470th Military Intelligence Brigade
- Conflicts: War on terror: War in Afghanistan
- Awards: Defense Superior Service Medal; Legion of Merit Medal; Meritorious Service Medal (4); Global War on Terrorism Expeditionary Medal

Major-General Kodjo S. Knox-Limbacker is a United States Army officer who currently serves as the Adjutant General of the Virgin Islands National Guard. He succeeded Brigadier-General Deborah Howell after being appointed by Governor of the Virgin Islands Albert Bryan in May 2019.

== Career ==
Knox-Limbacker first enlisted in the Georgia National Guard as an infantryman. Following graduation from Georgia Military College he entered the Army Reserve Officer Training Corps program at Augusta State University, he was commissioned as a second lieutenant of Army Aviation in the active duty army. From there he graduated from US Army flight school as a UH-1 Iroquois pilot in 1996. Later he transferred to Army fixed-wing aviation flying the C-12, RC-7, and U-21 among others. As an Army aviator, Knox-Limbacker has logged over 2,700 flight hours, including tours in Africa, Afghanistan, Bosnia and Herzegovina, Kosovo, and South America. After serving in the Pentagon, Knox-Limbacker was sent on a special active duty assignment to the Virgin Islands to fix chronic issues with readiness and discipline within the Virgin Islands National Guard.

=== Adjutant general ===
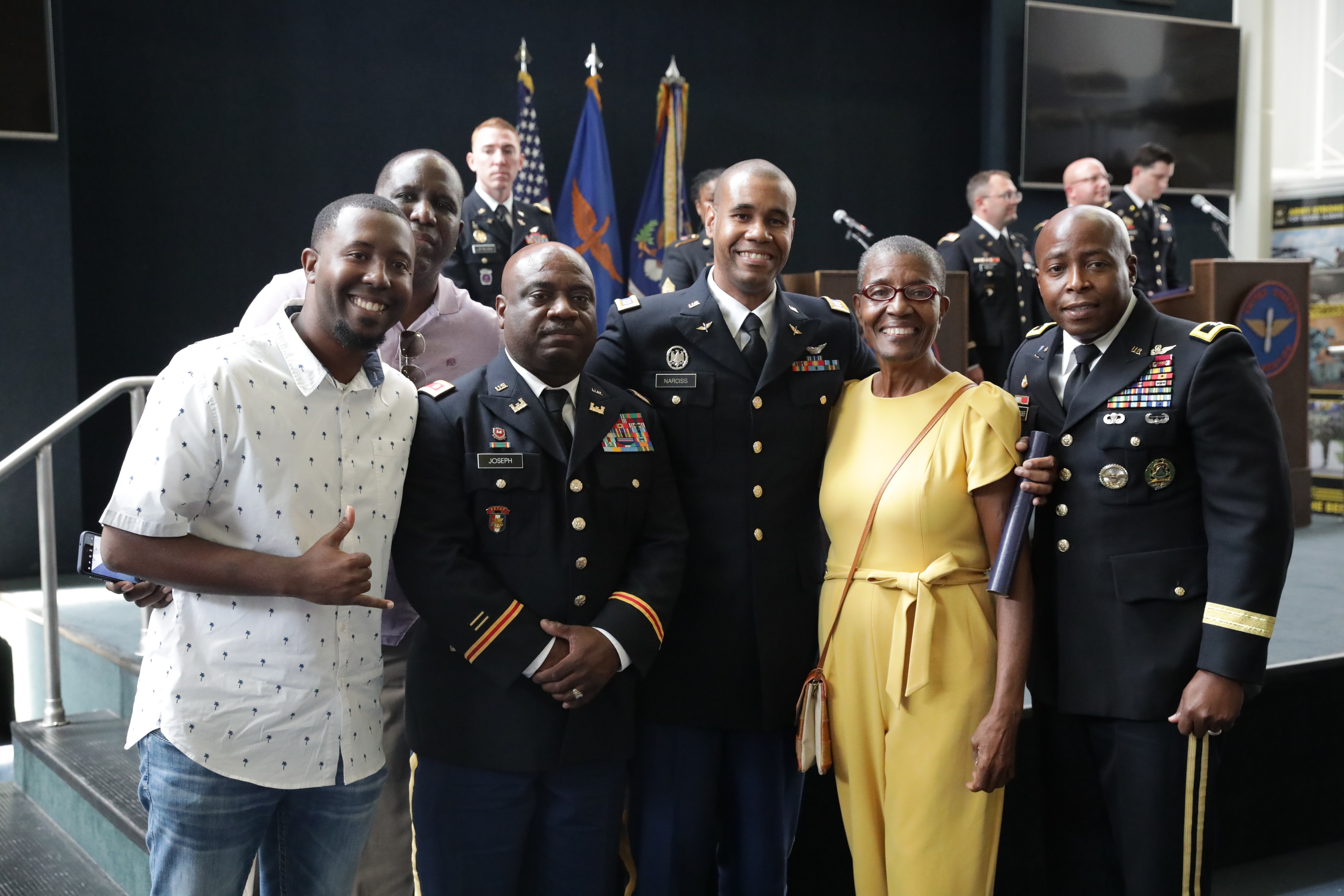
Virgin Islands National Guard Adjutant General Major General (VI) Kodjo Knox-Limbacker poses with Captain Elvor Narciss as he graduates US Army Flight School in Ft. Rucker on 5 May 2022. (U.S. Army photo by SPC Jordan Arnold.)

Then-Colonel Knox-Limbacker was announced as the next Adjutant General of the Virgin Islands by Governor Albert Bryan on January 15, 2019. Formally assuming the role of Adjutant General in May, Knox-Limbacker was unanimously confirmed by the Virgin Islands Legislature on July 12, 2019. As Adjutant General, Knox-Limbacker has promised to fix chronic pay issues lingering from unpaid National Guard soldiers during the 2017 Hurricanes that devastated the islands. In addition he has vowed to bring aviation back to the Virgin Islands National Guard, as it has been shut down since 2015 due to neglect and poor maintenance.

Knox-Limbacker was promoted from colonel to brigadier general on September 11, 2019. On July 30, 2020, he received federal recognition of this promotion. In June 2021, Knox-Limbacker was promoted to the Virgin Islands rank of Major General. In November 2022, his major general rank was given federal recognition.

== Dates of rank ==
Insignia	Rank	Component	Dates
	Second lieutenant	RA	28 May 1994
	First lieutenant	RA	28 May 1996
	Captain	RA	1 June 1998
	Major	RA	1 February 2005
	Lieutenant colonel	RA	4 April 2011
	Colonel	RA	1 May 2016
	Brigadier general (USVI)	VI	11 September 2019
	Brigadier general	RC	30 July 2020
	Major general (USVI)	VI	10 June 2021
	Major general	RC	30 November 2022
