= 206th Combat Communications Squadron =

- Active: 1992–2008
- Country: United States
- Branch: United States Air Force
- Type: Combat Communications
- Role: Combat Support
- Size: 60 (2001)
- Part of: Air National Guard/201st Combat Communications Group
- Garrison/HQ: Elmendorf AFB, Alaska

The United States Air Force's 206th Combat Communications Squadron (206 CBCS) was an Air National Guard combat communications unit located at Elmendorf AFB, Alaska.

== Mission ==
The 206th Combat Communications Squadron's mission was to provide crucial information technology services worldwide.

== History ==
The 206th Combat Communications Squadron (206 CBCS) can trace its distinguished history back to 1987 as the 176th Combat Communications Flight located on Kulis Air National Guard Base. Under this designation, the unit was charged with the support of a Collocated Operating Base (COB) within the NATO theater. During this period, the unit participated in various CONUS-based exercises in preparation for execution of the European mission.

In 1992, the military went through restructuring and due to the changing world situation the 206th Combat Communications Flight was formed to support the 11th Air Force during deployed wartime missions. The unit became a PACAF-gained combat communications unit effective 1 April 1993 and was relocated to Elmendorf Air Force Base.

On 1 July 1996, the unit was re-designated as the 206th Combat Communications Squadron. Over time, the unit's primary mission evolved to support Pacific theater communications requirements. The unit supported multiple missions and exercises across the Pacific theater. The principal means of this support was through the employment of satellite communications providing connectivity for a suite of deployable communications and computer services.

In December 2001, shortly after the 9/11 tragedy, unit members volunteered to deploy to Southwest Asia to such places as Kuwait, Saudi Arabia, Qatar and the United Arab Emirates to participate in Operation ENDURING FREEDOM / SOUTHERN WATCH. While there, they endured many tense moments and austere conditions while providing excellent communications support to combat actions.

The unit was inactivated in March 2008.

== Assignments ==
=== Major Command/Gaining Command ===
- Air National Guard/Pacific Air Forces (1992–2008)

=== Wing/Group ===
- 201st Combat Communications Group

== Previous designations ==
- 206th Combat Communications Squadron (1 Jul 1996 – 31 Mar 2008)
- 206th Combat Communications Flight (1992–1996)
- 176th Combat Communications Flight (1987–1992)

== Commanders ==
- LtCol Jeffrey S. Campbell 11 Mar 2004 – 31 Mar 2008
- Maj Renee S. Blake 20 Oct 2000 – 11 Mar 2004
- LtCol Richard S. Johnson 1 Jul 1996 – 20 Oct 2000

== Decorations ==
- Air Force Outstanding Unit Award
  - Order GA-6 1994 – Effective dates – 1 Jan 1993 – 31 Jul 1994
  - Order GA-32 1999 – Effective dates 1 Jan 1998 – 31 Aug 1999
  - Order GA-32 2002 – Effective dates 1 Sep 1999 – 30 Jul 2001
  - Order G-43 2006 – Effective dates 1 Jul 2003 – 30 Jun 2005
  - Order G-?? 2007 – Effective dates 31 Aug 2005 – 1 Sep 2007
