= 226th Combat Communications Group =

US combat communications headquarters unit

226th Combat Communications Group

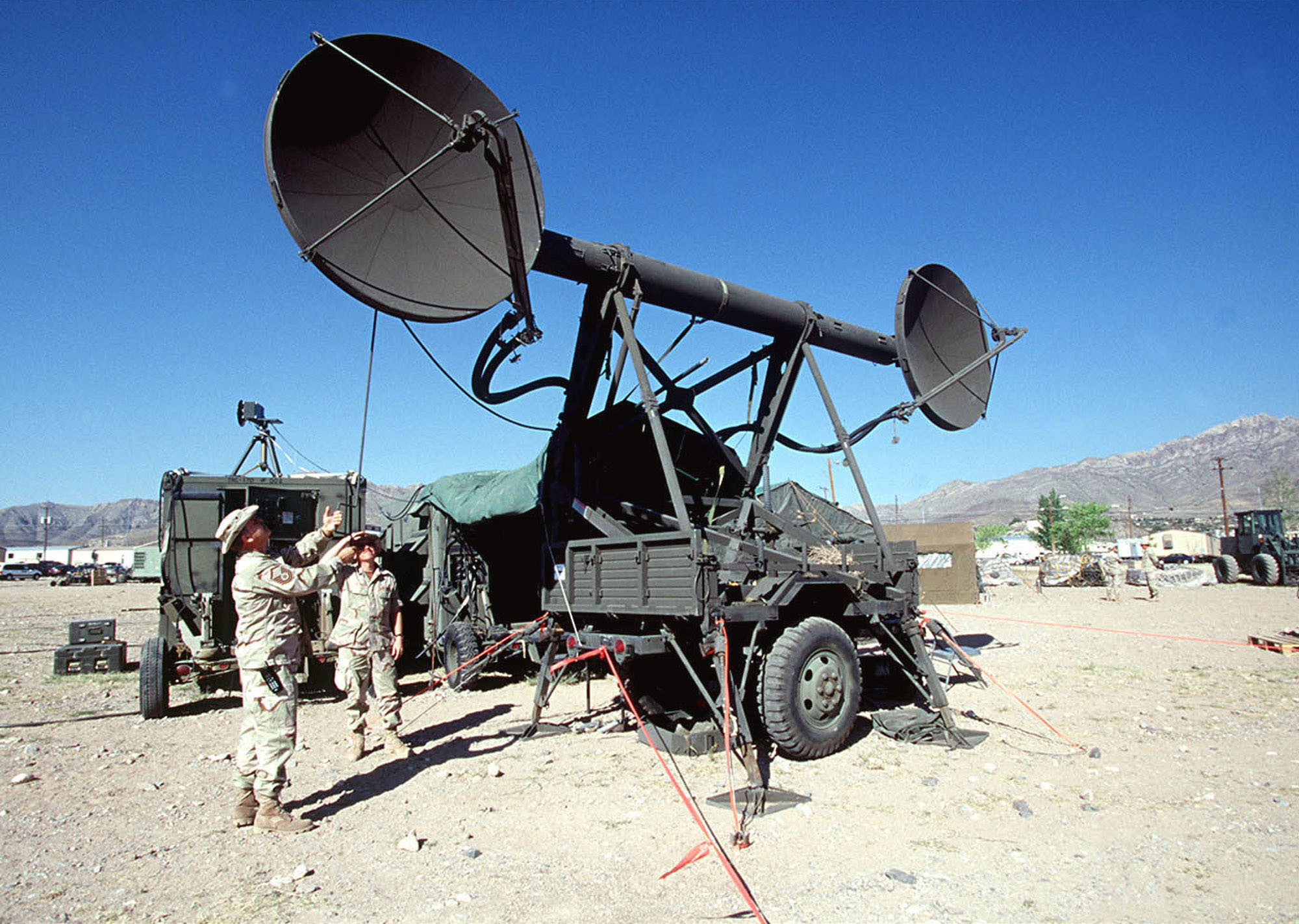
- Alabama Air National Guard AN/TRC-170 at Roving Sands 1997
- Active: 1971–present
- Country: United States
- Allegiance: Alabama Air National Guard
- Branch: United States Air Force
- Role: Combat communications
- Part of: Alabama Air National Guard
- Garrison/HQ: Abston Air National Guard Station, Alabama
- Decorations: Air Force Outstanding Unit Award

Insignia
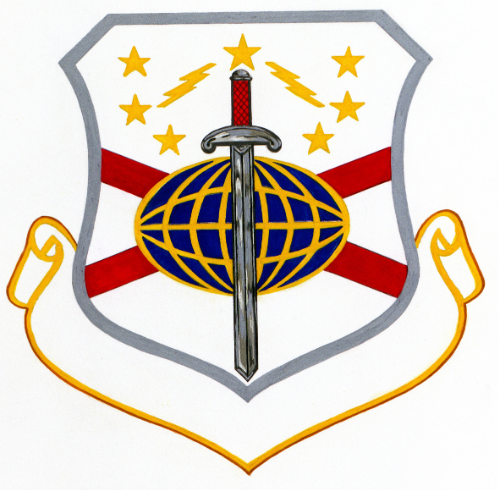
- 226th Combat Communications Group emblem (Note: Approved c. 1991. Significance: Blue and yellow are the Air force colors. Blue alludes to the sky, the primary theater of Air force operations. Yellow refers to the sun and the excellence required of Air Force personnel. The red "X" is reminiscent of the Alabama state flag and reflects the unit’s home location. The sword surmounting the globe represents the Group’s support to the tactical units and their ability to rapidly deploy anywhere in the world. The large star at the pommel of the sword handle stands for the Group’s headquarters. The six smaller stars denote the subordinate elements of the Group and the lightning flashes symbolize the electronic connectivity provided between the Group’s headquarters and its field units.)

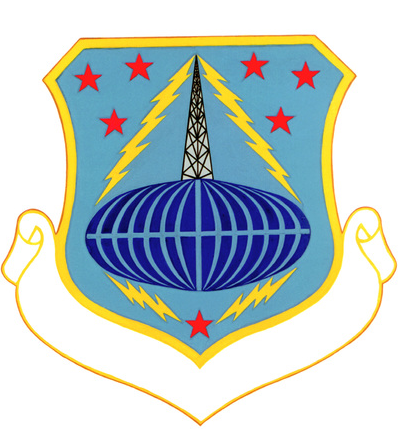
- 226th Combat Communications Group emblem (Note: Approved c. 1982.)

The United States Air Force's 226th Combat Communications Group is a combat communications headquarters unit located at Abston Air National Guard Station in Montgomery, Alabama. The group is one of two Air National Guard combat communications groups nationwide, which together constitute over 60% of the U.S. Air Force's tactical communications capability. The 226th is one of three major organizations that make up the Alabama Air National Guard.

== Mission ==
The mission of the group is to command, organize, equip, train and administer assigned and attached forces to ensure complete mission readiness in support of emergency United States Air Force requirements, and to provide timely and reliable communications and engineering and installation in support of state emergencies.

== History ==
The 226th was originally organized on 18 June 1954 as part of the 225th Radio Relay Squadron, which was organized in March 1953 in Greenville, Mississippi, as part of the Mississippi Air National Guard. The unit was formally organized on 18 June 1954, and was eventually transferred to the Alabama Air National Guard and relocated to Gadsden, Alabama.

On 22 February 1971, an element of the 225th was reorganized as the Headquarters, 226th Mobile Communications Group and allotted to the National Guard Bureau. (The remainder of the 225th eventually became the 225th Combat Communications Squadron.) The unit received federal recognition on 29 September 1971. In 1986, the 226th was renamed, becoming the 226th Combat Communications Group.

The group headquarters moved to Abston Air National Guard Station in February 1996.

The 226th gained seven additional squadrons on 1 October 2013, when the 281st Combat Communications Group was inactivated.

== Lineage ==
- Constituted as the 226th Mobile Communications Group and allotted to the Air National Guard on 22 February 1971

Federally recognized on 13 September 1971
Redesignated 226th Combat Communications Group on 1 April 1976
Redesignated 226th Combat Information Systems Group on 1 July 1985
Redesignated 226th Combat Communications Group on 1 October 1986

=== Assignments ===
Major Command/Gaining Command

- Air Force Communications Service (later Air Force Communications Command) (1971–1992)
- Air Combat Command (1992–2008)
- Air Force Space Command (2008–2018)
- Air Combat Command (2018–Present)

=== Components ===
Currently assigned / aligned

- 156th Combat Communications Squadron – Muñiz Air National Guard Base, Carolina, Puerto Rico
- 224th Joint Communications Support Squadron – Brunswick ANGS, Brunswick, Georgia
- 232d Combat Communications Squadron – Abston ANGS, Montgomery, Alabama
- 263d Combat Communications Squadron – New London ANGS, New London, North Carolina
- 265th Combat Communications Squadron – South Portland ANGS, South Portland, Maine
- 269th Combat Communications Squadron – Springfield ANGS, Springfield, Ohio
- 271st Combat Communications Squadron – Fort Indiantown Gap, Annville, Pennsylvania
- 280th Special Operations Communications Squadron – Dothan Regional Airport ANGS, Dothan, Alabama
- 282d Combat Communications Squadron – North Smithfield ANGS, North Smithfield, Rhode Island
- 283d Combat Communications Squadron – Dobbins ARB, Georgia
- 290th Joint Communications Support Squadron – MacDill AFB, Florida

Previously assigned / aligned

- 114th Combat Communications Squadron – Patrick Space Force Base, Florida
- 115th Air Control Squadron – Dothan, Alabama
- 225th Combat Communications Squadron – Gadsden, Alabama
- 228th Combat Communications Squadron – McGhee-Tyson ANGB, Tennessee
- 240th Combat Communications Squadron – McEntire ANGB, South Carolina
- 241st Engineering Installation Squadron – Chattanooga, Tennessee
- 245th Air Traffic Control Squadron – McEntire ANGB, South Carolina
- 267th Combat Communications Squadron – Joint Base Cape Cod (formerly Otis ANGB), Massachusetts
- 285th Combat Communications Squadron (? – 3 March 2012) – St. Croix, U.S. Virgin Islands

=== Stations ===
- Martin Air National Guard Station, Gadsden, Alabama, 13 September 1971
- Abston Air National Guard Station, Montgomery, Alabama, February 1996 – present

=== Awards and campaigns ===
Award streamer	Award	Dates	Notes
	Air Force Outstanding Unit Award	1 January 1976 – 31 December 1977	
	Air Force Outstanding Unit Award	1 January 1989 – 31 December 1989	
	Air Force Outstanding Unit Award	1 January 1990 – 31 December 1990	
	Air Force Outstanding Unit Award	1 January 1991 – 31 December 1991	
	Air Force Outstanding Unit Award	1 January 1996 – 31 December 1997	
	Air Force Outstanding Unit Award	1 October 2012 – 30 September 2014	
	Air Force Outstanding Unit Award	1 October 2014 – 30 September 2016	
	Air Force Outstanding Unit Award	1 October 2016 – 30 September 2018	
	Air Force Outstanding Unit Award	1 October 2018 – 30 September 2020	
