= 285th Civil Engineering Squadron =

285th Civil Engineer Squadron
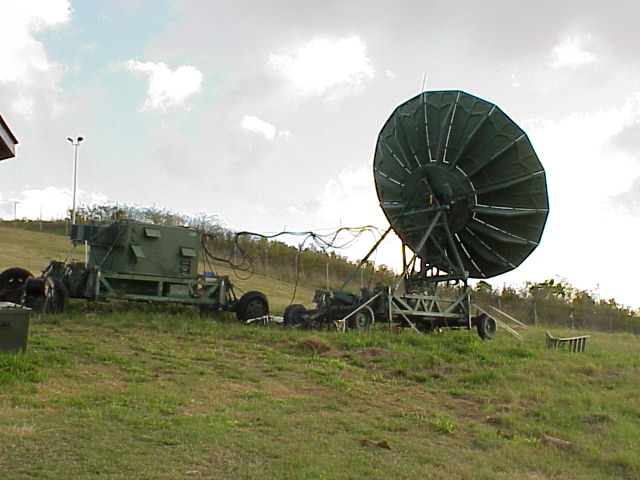
- Satellite Communications transmitter of the 285th Combat Communications Squadron
- Active: 7 May 1980 – present
- Country: United States
- Allegiance: U.S. Virgin Islands
- Branch: Air National Guard
- Type: Civil Engineer
- Role: USSOUTHCOM combat support
- Part of: Air National Guard
- Garrison/HQ: St Croix ANGS, United States Virgin Islands

Insignia
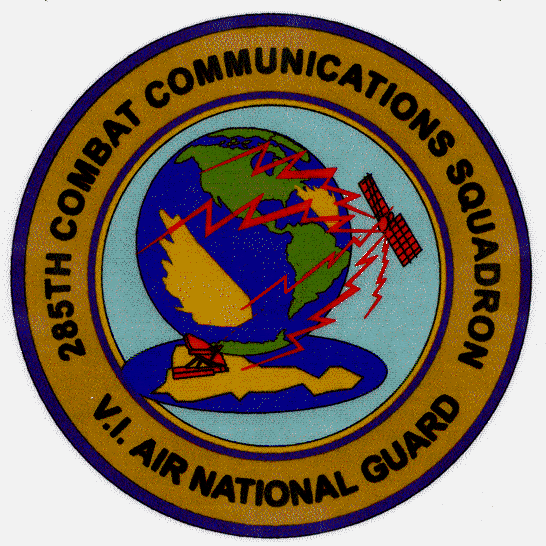
- Emblem of the 285th Combat Communications Squadron

The United States Air Force's 285th Civil Engineering Squadron (285 CES) is an Air National Guard civil engineering unit located at St Croix ANGS.

== History ==
On 7 May 1980 the 285th Combat Communications Flight (CMBTCF) was established, creating the first unit of the Virgin Islands Air National Guard. The flight was upgraded to a squadron in 1996 and made a name for itself following the devastation of Hurricane Hugo to the region in 1989, when the unit and its installation became the heart of recovery operations for St. Croix.

External image
- 2012 change of command

Over the years, the unit has been involved in several contingency operations, to include Joint Endeavor, Uphold Democracy, Joint Forge, and both Iraqi and Enduring Freedom.

On 3 March 2012 the unit was redesignated a Civil Engineer Squadron after losing its communications mission.

== Assignments ==
=== Major command/gaining command ===
- Air National Guard/ (???- ???)

=== Wing/group ===
- 226th Combat Communications Group (1980–?)

== Previous designations ==
- 285th Combat Communications Flight (1980–1996)
- 285th Combat Communications Squadron (1996–3 March 2012)
- 285th Civil Engineer Squadron (3 March 2012 – present)

== Bases stationed ==
- St Croix ANGS, Virgin Islands (1980–Present)

== Decorations ==
Air Force Outstanding Unit Award

- 1989
- 1 January 1990 - 31 December 1990
- 1991
- 1 September 1995 – 31 August 1997

== Gallery ==
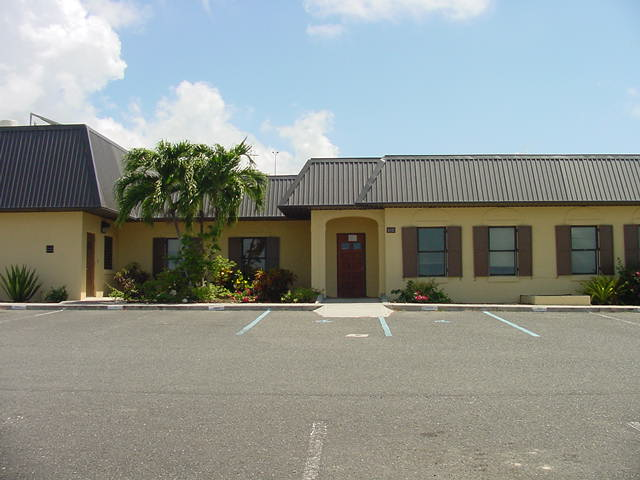
Virgin Islands ANG operations building

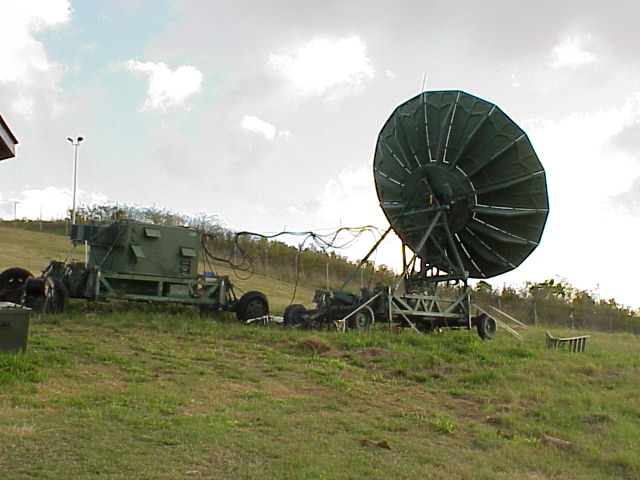
285th CBCS radio antenna
