= 291st Combat Communications Squadron =

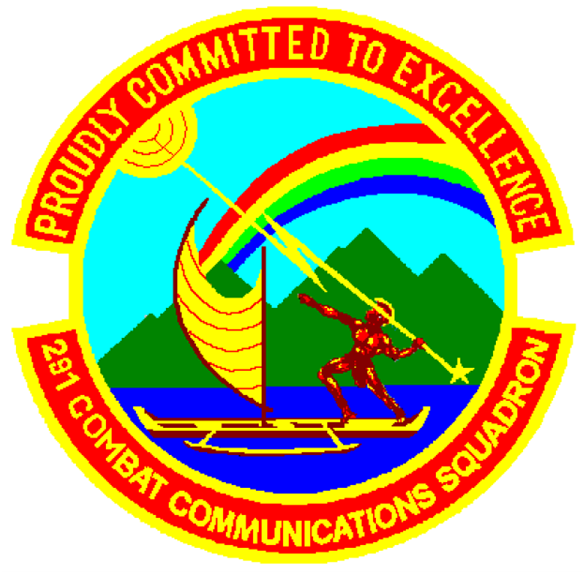
- 291st Combat Communications Squadron emblem
- Active: 1967 – present
- Country: United States
- Branch: United States Air Force
- Part of: Air National Guard
- Garrison/HQ: Keaukaha Military Reservation Hilo, Hawaii (1976 – present)
- Engagements: Operation Enduring Freedom Operation Iraqi Freedom Operation New Dawn

The United States Air Force's 291st Combat Communications Squadron is an Air National Guard combat communications unit located at Keaukaha Military Reservation in Hilo, Hawaii.

== Mission ==
The 291st Combat Communication Squadron (291st CBCS) Employs tactical cyber operations for combat enablement. Installs computer and telephone networks, high frequency radio systems, and administers network security operations.

== History ==
The 291st Combat Communications Squadron was activated into federal service 6 March 1967 at Hickam Air Force Base, Oahu, Hawaii. The organization relocated to temporary World War II vintage quarters on the Island of Hawaii in March 1976. In October 1982, the unit moved to its current facilities. The squadron is one of seven subordinate units of the 154th Mission Support Group headquartered at Joint Base Pearl Harbor-Hickam, Oahu, Hawaii.

== Assignments ==
=== Major Command/Gaining Command ===
- Air Force Space Command (2009 – present)
- Pacific Air Forces (1967–2009)

=== Wing/Group ===
- 154th Wing

== Bases stationed ==
- Keaukaha Military Reservation, Hilo, Hawaii (1976 – present)
- Hickam Air Force Base, Oahu, Hawaii (1967–1976)

== Commanders ==
- Lieutenant Colonel Krystelle D. Kenney (2024-Present)
- Lieutenant Colonel Thomas E. Naldrett (2022-2024)
- Lieutenant Colonel Heather M.C. Leite (2017–2022)
- Lieutenant Colonel Garrick H. Yokoe (2010 – 2017)
- Major Johnny Mah (2005–2009)
- Lieutenant Colonel Roy A. Cornella (1992–2005)
- Lieutenant Colonel Richard Nishimura (1990–1992)
- Lieutenant Colonel William Wright (1984–1990)
- Major Richard Nishimura (1981–1984)
- Lieutenant Colonel David Howard (?–1981)
